= List of Cabinets of Puerto Rico by session =

List of Cabinets of Puerto Rico by session contains the various cabinet-level officeholders of Puerto Rico organized by legislative session.

Session	Governor	Start	End
15th	Luis Fortuño	January 12, 2009	January 13, 2013
16th	Alejandro García Padilla	January 14, 2013	January 8, 2017

== 15th Cabinet ==
=== Secretaries ===
Name	Office	Department	Term of Office
Kenneth D. McClintock	Secretary of State	Department of State	2009-2013
Miguel Romero	Chief of Staff	Office of the Governor	August 1, 2012 – 2013

=== Former Secretaries ===
Name	Office	Department	Started office	Left office
Antonio Sagardía	Attorney General	Department of Justice	January 12, 2009	December 23, 2009
Marcos Rodríguez Ema	Chief of Staff	Office of the Governor	January 12, 2009	July 31, 2012

== 16th Cabinet ==
=== Secretaries ===
Name	Post	Agency	Date assumed office	Date vacated office
Alberto Bacó Bagué	Secretary of Economic Development and Commerce	Department of Economic Development and Commerce	January 2, 2013	incumbent
Carmen Guerrero Pérez	Secretary of Natural and Environmental Resources	Department of Natural and Environmental Resources	January 2, 2013	incumbent
David Bernier	Secretary of State	Department of State	January 2, 2013	October 30, 2015
Ana Rius	Secretary of Health	Department of Health	September 19, 2013	incumbent
Idalia Colón Rondón	Secretary of Family Affairs	Department of Family Affairs	January 2, 2013	incumbent
José Negrón Fernández	Secretary of Corrections and Rehabilitation	Department of Family Affairs	January 2, 2013	incumbent
César Miranda	Secretary of Justice	Department of Justice	January 1, 2014	
Melba Acosta	Secretary of Treasury	Department of Treasury	January 2, 2013	incumbent
Miguel Torres Díaz	Secretary of Transportation and Public Works	Department of Transportation and Public Works	January 2, 2013	incumbent
Myrna Comas Pagán	Secretary of Agriculture	Department of Agriculture	January 2, 2013	incumbent
Nery Adamés Soto	Secretary of Consumer Affairs	Department of Consumer Affairs	January 9, 2013	incumbent
Ramón Orta	Secretary of Sports and Recreation	Department of Sports and Recreation	January 2, 2013	incumbent
Rafael Román Meléndez	Secretary of Education	Department of Education	January 2, 2013	incumbent
Rubén Ríos Pagán	Secretary of Housing	Department of Housing	January 2, 2013	incumbent
Vance Thomas	Secretary of Labor and Human Resources	Department of Labor and Human Resources	January 2, 2013	incumbent

=== Cabinet-level officers ===
Name	Post	Agency	Date assumed office	Date vacated office
Carlos Rivas	Director	Office of Management and Budget	January 2, 2013	incumbent
Ingrid Vila Biaggi	Chief of Staff	Secretariat of Governance	January 2, 2013	September 19, 2013
Javier Ferrer (Note: The President of the Puerto Rico Government Development Bank (GDB) is considered a Cabinet-level officer since the GDB serves as the government's fiscal agent and financial advisor even though the GDB is a government-owned corporation.)	President	Government Development Bank	January 2, 2013	July, 2013
Juan Eugenio Hernández Mayoral	Director	Federal Affairs Administration	January 2, 2013	incumbent
Luis García Pelatti	President	Planning Board	January 9, 2003	incumbent
Víctor Suárez	Chief of Staff	Secretariat of Governance	September 19, 2013	incumbent

=== Governor's Advisory Board ===
Name	Post	Agency	Date assumed office	Date vacated office
Arturo Ríos Escribano	Labor Affairs Advisor	Secretariat of Governance	January 2, 2013	incumbent

=== Government-owned corporations ===
Name	Post	Agency	Date it took office	Date it left office
Alberto Lázaro	Executive Director	Puerto Rico Aqueducts and Sewers Authority	January 2, 2013	incumbent
Antonio L. Medina Comas	President	Puerto Rico Industrial Development Company	January 2, 2013	incumbent
Grace M. Santana	Executive Director	Authority for the Financing of the Infrastructure of Puerto Rico	January 2, 2013	incumbent
Francisco Chévere	Executive Director	Puerto Rico Trade and Export Company	January 2, 2013	incumbent
Ingrid Rivera Rocafort	Executive Director	Puerto Rico Tourism Company	January 2, 2013	incumbent
Javier Ferrer	President	Puerto Rico Government Development Bank	January 2, 2013	incumbent
Víctor Suárez	Executive Director	Puerto Rico Ports Authority	January 2, 2013	incumbent

=== Other agencies ===
Name	Post	Agency	Date took office	Date left office
Juan José Medina	Adjutant General	National Guard	January 2, 2013	incumbent
Luis Castro	Administrator	Administration of General Services	January 9, 2013	September 23, 2016
Marta Elsa Fernández	Administrator	Administration for the Socioeconomic Development of the Family	January 2, 2013	incumbent
Miguel Ríos Torres	Director	State Agency for Emergency and Disaster Management	January 2, 2013	incumbent
Olga Bernardy	Administrator	Administration for Child Care and the Integrated Development of Childhood	January 2, 2013	incumbent
Rosabelle Padín	Administrator	Administration for Child Support	January 2, 2013	incumbent
Salvador Santiago	Administrator	Administration of Mental Health and Anti-Addiction Services	January 2, 2013	incumbent
Vanessa J. Pintado	Administrator	Administration for Families and Children	January 2, 2013	incumbent

=== Resignations ===
- July 19, 2013: Javier Ferrer resigns as President of the Government Development Bank.
- September 13, 2013: Francisco Joglar Pesquera resigns to his position as Secretary of Health amidst controversy on how he managed an outbreak of the bacteria acinetobacter baumannii at the University of Puerto Rico at Carolina hospital.
- May 18, 2014: Carlos del Valle, executive director of the Puerto Rico National Parks, dies in a car accident while driving under the influence. (Note: NotiCel (2014; in Spanish) "[...] el funcionario estaba bajo los efectos del alcohol cuando tuvo el fatal accidente.")
- September 19, 2014: Ingrid Vila Biaggi resigns to her position as Chief of Staff. Víctor Suárez is appointed in her stead.

== 17th Cabinet ==
=== Secretaries ===
The Secretaries are the heads of the executive departments of the government of Puerto Rico.

Name	Post	Agency	Date assumed office	Date vacated office
VACANT	Secretary of State	Department of State		
Dennise Longo	Secretary of Justice	Department of Justice	August 18, 2019	
Francisco Parés	Secretary of Treasury	Department of Treasury	July 1, 2019	
Eligio Hernández	Secretary of Education	Department of Education	July 24, 2019	
Manuel A. Laboy	Secretary of Economic Development and Commerce	Department of Economic Development and Commerce	January 2, 2017	
VACANT	Secretary of Natural and Environmental Resources	Department of Natural and Environmental Resources		
Rafael Rodríguez Mercado	Secretary of Health	Department of Health	January 2, 2017	
Glorimar Andujar	Secretary of Family Affairs	Department of Family Affairs	January 2, 2017	
Erik Rolon	Secretary of Corrections and Rehabilitation	Department of Family Affairs	January 2, 2017	
Carlos Contreras Aponte	Secretary of Transportation and Public Works	Department of Transportation and Public Works	January 2, 2017	
Carlos Alberto Flores Ortega	Secretary of Agriculture	Department of Agriculture	January 2, 2017	
VACANT	Secretary of Consumer Affairs	Department of Consumer Affairs		
Adriana Sánchez	Secretary of Sports and Recreation	Department of Sports and Recreation	January 22, 2018	
Fernando Gil	Secretary of Housing	Department of Housing	January 2, 2017	
Briseida Torres Reyes	Secretary of Labor and Human Resources	Department of Labor and Human Resources	May 20, 2019	

=== Cabinet-level officers ===
Name	Post	Agency	Date assumed office	Date vacated office
José Marrero	Director	Office of Management and Budget		
Eduardo Rivera Cruz	Executive Director	Office of the Authority for the Financing of the Infrastructure		
Vacant (Note: The President of the Puerto Rico Government Development Bank (GDB) is considered a Cabinet-level officer since the GDB serves as the government's fiscal agent and financial advisor even though the GDB is a government-owned corporation.)	President	Government Development Bank		
Carlos Mercader	Director	Federal Affairs Administration		
	President	Planning Board		
	Chief of Staff	Secretariat of Governance		

=== Other agencies ===
Name	Post	Agency	Date assumed office	Date vacated office
Michelle Fraley	Superintendent of the Puerto Rico Police	Police of Puerto Rico	January 2, 2017	January 8, 2018
Alberto Cruz	Fire Chief	Puerto Rico Firefighters Corps	January 14, 2017	designated
	Director of the Agency	Puerto Rico State Agency for Emergency and Disaster Management	January 20, 2017	designated
Luis Román Negrón	Solicitor General of Puerto Rico	Office of the Solicitor General of Puerto Rico	March 31, 2017	designated
