= Government of Wanda Vázquez Garced =

19th Cabinet of the Puerto Rican Constitutional Government

- 19th Constitutional Government of Puerto Rico
- 2019–2021
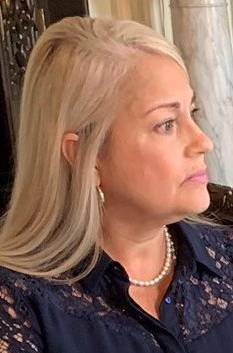
- Governor Vázquez Garced in a meeting.
- Date formed: 7 August 2019
- Date dissolved: 2 January 2021

People and organisations
- President of the United States of America: Donald J. Trump
- Governor: Wanda Vázquez Garced
- Secretary of State: María A. Marcano de León (acting, 2019); Elmer Román (2019–2020); Raúl Márquez Hernández (2020–2021)
- Total no. of members: 16 Secretaries (Note: Does not include the Governor or the Secretariat of Governance.); 21 Cabinet Members
- Member party: PNP Ind.
- Status in legislature: Majority party in both chambers Senate 21 / 30 (70%) House of Representatives 34 / 51 (67%)
- Opposition party: PPD (largest); MVC; PIP; Ind.
- Opposition leader: Aníbal José Torres (2018–2020); Carlos Delgado Altieri (2020)

History
- Elections: 2016 Puerto Rico gubernatorial election 2016 Puerto Rico Senate election 2016 Puerto Rico House of Representatives election
- Outgoing election: 2020 Puerto Rico gubernatorial election
- Legislature term: 18th Legislative Assembly of Puerto Rico
- Budget: 2020–2021 Puerto Rico budget
- Advice and consent: Senate of Puerto Rico; House of Representatives of Puerto Rico (Note: The House provides advice and consent for the Secretary of State, as he is first in line in the Puerto Rico governor' order of succession as established in Article IV, Section 5 of the Constitution of Puerto Rico (1952))
- Incoming formation: Resignation of Ricardo Rosselló Nevares as a result of Telegramgate on 31 July 2019
- Predecessor: Government of Ricardo Rosselló Nevares
- Successor: Government of Pedro Pierluisi Urrutia

The government of Wanda Vázquez Garced was formed the week following the resignation of Governor Ricardo Rosselló Nevares as a result of the massive protests resulting from the Telegramgate scandal, and a Supreme Court decision that vacated the office from an invalid occupant.

== Background ==
While the Secretary of State, Luis G. Rivera Marín, would have been the successor, his involvement in the scandal forced his resignation earlier in July 2019. Rosselló Nevares attempted to name a successor in Pedro Pierluisi Urrutia by nominating him for the Secretary of State, but his confirmation was stalled in the 18th Legislative Assembly of Puerto Rico.

The situation led to confusion as Rosselló resigned without a confirmed Secretary of State, who at the same time swore in on his own ceremony, becoming de facto governor. After a week, the Supreme Court of Puerto Rico decided in Senado de Puerto Rico v. Gobierno de Puerto Rico, 2019 TSPR 138 CT-2019-4 (Supreme Court of Puerto Rico 2019) that the clear successor was the Secretary of Justice of Puerto Rico, annulled any recognition or vestiges of legitimacy in the week-long Pierluisi government.

Pierluisi vacated the Palace of Santa Catalina at noon of 7 August 2019, and Wanda Vázquez Garced was sworn that day at 5pm as the 13th Constitutional Governor of Puerto Rico. Her New Progressive Party (PNP) had majorities on both chambers of the 18th Legislative Assembly of Puerto Rico and she inherited several cabinet members from the previous government.

== Party breakdown ==
Party breakdown of cabinet members, not including the governor:

- New Progressive Party
- Independents
19
2

The cabinet was composed of members of the PNP and two independents or technical positions (or people whose membership in a party was not clearly ascertained from any available media).

== Members of the Cabinet ==
The Puerto Rican Cabinet is led by the Governor, along with, starting in 1986., the Secretary of Governance. The Cabinet is composed of all members of the Constitutional Council of Secretaries (Article IV of the Constitution of Puerto Rico (1952)), who are the heads of the executive departments, along with other Cabinet-level officers who report directly to the Governor of Puerto Rico or to the Secretary of Governance, but who are not heads nor members of an executive office. All the Cabinet-level officers are at the same bureaucratic level as of the Secretaries

Office	Name	Party	Term
=== Governor ===
Governor of Puerto Rico; Gobernación de Puerto Rico	Wanda Vázquez Garced	PNP	7 August 2019 – 2 January 2021
=== Office of the Governor ===
Secretariat of Governance; Secretaría de la Gobernación	Zoé Laboy Alvarado	PNP	21 August 2019 – 31 December 2019
Secretariat of Governance; Secretaría de la Gobernación	Antonio Luis Pabón Batlle	PNP	31 December 2019 – 2 January 2021
President of the Puerto Rico Planning Board; Presidencia de la Junta de Planificación	María del Carmen Gordillo Pérez	PNP	2 January 2017 – 2 January 2021
Executive Director for Federal Affairs; Directoría Ejecutiva de PRFAA	Jennifer Storipan	PNP	1 August 2019 – 15 January 2021
=== Council of Secretaries ===
Secretary of State; Secretaría de Estado	María Marcano de León (acting)	PNP	4 August 2019- December 2019
Secretary of State; Secretaría de Estado	Elmer Román	PNP	20 December 2019 – 23 August 2020
Secretary of State; Secretaría de Estado	Raúl Márquez Hernández	PNP	30 August 2020 – 2 January 2021
Secretary of Justice; Secretaría de Justicia	Dennise Longo Quiñones	PNP	18 August 2019 – 7 July 2020
Secretary of Justice; Secretaría de Justicia	Inés del Carmen Carrau Martínez (acting)	PNP	7 July 2020 – 2 January 2021
Secretary of the Treasury; Secretaría de Hacienda	Francisco Parés Alicea	Ind.	24 June 2019 – Present
Secretary of Education; Secretaría de Educación	Eligio Hernández Perez	Ind.	8 April 2019 – 31 December 2020
Secretary of Labor and Human Resources; Secretaría del Trabajo y Recursos Humanos	Briseida Torres Reyes	PNP	8 May 2019 – 9 June 2020
Secretary of Labor and Human Resources; Secretaría del Trabajo y Recursos Humanos	Carlos Rivera Santiago	PNP	9 June 2020 – 31 December 2021
Secretary of Transportation and Public Works; Secretaría de Transportación y Obras Públicas	Carlos Contreras Aponte	PNP	2 January 2017 - 1 January 2021
Secretary of Economic Development and Commerce; Secretaría de Desarrollo Económico y Comercio	Manuel Laboy Rivera	PNP	9 January 2017 – 1 January 2021
Secretary of Health; Secretaría de Salud	Rafael Rodríguez Mercado	PNP	2 January 2017 – 13 March 2020
Secretary of Health; Secretaría de Salud	Concepción Quiñones de Longo (acting)	PNP	13 March 2020 – 26 March 2020
Secretary of Health; Secretaría de Salud	Lorenzo González Feliciano	PNP	26 March 2020 – 2 January 2021
Secretary of Agriculture; Secretaría de Agricultura	Carlos Alberto Flores Ortega	PNP	2 January 2017 – 1 January 2021
Secretary of Consumer Affairs; Secretaría de Asuntos del Consumidor	Carmen Salgado Rodríguez	PNP	9 June 2019 – 1 January 2021
Secretary of Corrections and Rehabilitation; Secretaría de Corrección y Rehabilitación	Eduardo Rivera Juanatey	PNP	14 September 2019 – 2 January 2021
Secretary of Family Affairs; Secretaría de la Familia	Glorimar Andújar Matos	PNP	9 January 2017 – 19 January 2020
Secretary of Family Affairs; Secretaría de la Familia	Orlando López Belmonte	PNP	14 May 2020 – 1 January 2021
Secretary of Housing; Secretaría de Vivienda	Fernando Gil Enseñat	PNP	9 January 2017 – 19 January 2020
Secretary of Housing; Secretaría de Vivienda	Luis Carlos Fernández Trinchet	PNP	28 January 2020 – 1 January 2021
Secretary of Natural and Environmental Resources; Secretaría de Recursos Naturales y Ambientales	Tania Vázquez Rivera	PNP	2 January 2017 – 7 November 2019
Secretary of Natural and Environmental Resources; Secretaría de Recursos Naturales y Ambientales	Rafael Machargo Maldonado	PNP	7 February 2020 – 31 March 2022
Secretary of Public Safety; Secretaría de Seguridad Pública	Elmer Román	PNP	2 April 2019-December 2019
Secretary of Public Safety; Secretaría de Seguridad Pública	Pedro Janer Román	PNP	December 2019-1 January 2021
Secretary of Sports and Recreation; Secretaría de Deportes y Recreación	Adriana Sánchez Parés	PNP	15 January 2018 – 1 January 2021
=== Other Cabinet-level officers ===
Inspector General; Inspectoría General	Ivelisse Torres Rivera	PNP	16 January 2019 – Present
Executive Director of the Puerto Rico Fiscal Agency and Financial Advisory Authority; Directoría Ejecutiva de la Autoridad de Asesoría Financiera y Agencia Fiscal de Puerto Rico	Omar J. Marrero Díaz	PNP	31 July 2019 – Present

== Notes ==
Preceded by Rosselló Nevares (2017-2019)	Government of Puerto Rico; 2019–2021	Succeeded by Pierluisi Urrutia (2021-present)
