= Government of Pedro Pierluisi Urrutia =

Cabinet of the Puerto Rican government, 2021–2025

- 20th Constitutional Government of Puerto Rico
- 2021-2025
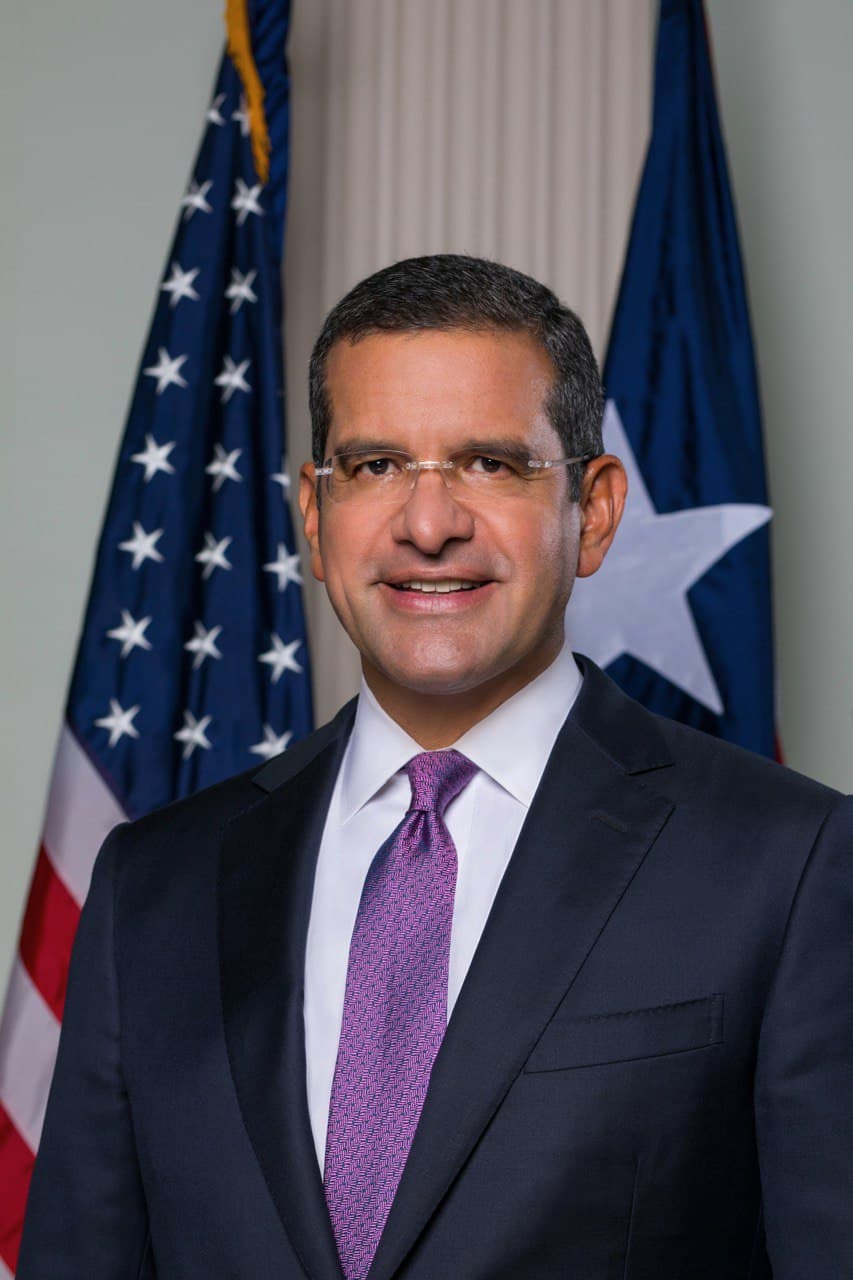
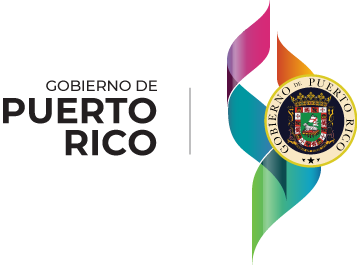
- Pierluisi Urrutia's official portrait (left) and government logo used during his term (right).
- Date formed: 2 January 2021
- Date dissolved: 2 January 2025

People and organisations
- President of the United States of America: Donald J. Trump (2021); Joseph Robinette Biden (2021–2025)
- Governor: Pedro Pierluisi Urrutia
- Secretary of State: Larry Seilhamer Rodríguez (2021-2021); Omar Marrero Díaz (2021-2025)
- Total no. of members: 16 Secretaries (Note: Does not include the Governor or the Secretariat of Governance.); 21 Cabinet Members
- Member parties: PNP Ind.
- Status in legislature: Minority party in both chambers Senate 10 / 27 (37%) House of Representatives 21 / 51 (41%)
- Opposition parties: PPD (largest); MVC; PIP; PD; Ind.
- Opposition leaders: José Luis Dalmau 2021-2023 (PPD); Jesus Manuel Ortiz since 2023 (PPD); Juan Dalmau (PIP); Manuel Natal Albelo (MVC)

History
- Elections: 2020 Puerto Rico gubernatorial election 2020 Puerto Rico Senate election 2020 Puerto Rico House of Representatives election
- Legislature term: 19th Legislative Assembly of Puerto Rico
- Budgets: 2021 Puerto Rico Budget; 2022 Puerto Rico Budget
- Advice and consent: Senate of Puerto Rico; House of Representatives of Puerto Rico (Note: The House provides advice and consent for the Secretary of State, as he is first in line in the Puerto Rico governor' order of succession as established in Article IV, Section 5 of the Constitution of Puerto Rico (1952))
- Incoming formation: 2020 Puerto Rico gubernatorial election
- Predecessor: Government of Wanda Vázquez Garced
- Successor: Government of Jennifer González Colón

The government of Pedro Pierluisi Urrutia was formed in the weeks following the 2020 Puerto Rico gubernatorial election as he released a list of nominees for most of the positions before his swearing in on 2 January 2021. His New Progressive Party (PNP) not having a majority in either chamber of the 19th Legislative Assembly of Puerto Rico meant that he would have to further negotiate the approval of his nominees with the opposition parties that hold control of the legislature.

== Party breakdown ==
Party breakdown of cabinet members (until April 2021), not including the governor:

- New Progressive Party
- Independents
18
3

The cabinet was composed of members of the PNP and at a point, three independent or technical positions (or people whose membership in a party was not clearly ascertained from any available media). After April 2021 it was composed as follows.

- New Progressive Party
- Independents
19
2

== Members of the Cabinet ==
The Puerto Rican Cabinet is led by the Governor, along with, starting in 1986., the Secretary of Governance. The Cabinet is composed of all members of the Constitutional Council of Secretaries (Article IV of the Constitution of Puerto Rico (1952)), who are the heads of the executive departments, along with other Cabinet-level officers who report directly to the Governor of Puerto Rico or to the Secretary of Governance, but who are not heads nor members of an executive office. All the Cabinet-level officers are at the same bureaucratic level as of the Secretaries.

Office	Name	Party	Term
=== Governor ===
Governor of Puerto Rico; Gobernación de Puerto Rico	Pedro Pierluisi Urrutia	PNP	2 January 2021 – 2 January 2025
=== Office of the Governor ===
Secretariat of Governance; Secretaría de la Gobernación	Noelia García Bardales	PNP	2 January 2021 – 2 January 2025
President of the Puerto Rico Planning Board; Presidencia de la Junta de Planificación	Manuel A.G. Hidalgo Rivera	PNP	2 January 2021 – 21 December 2021
President of the Puerto Rico Planning Board; Presidencia de la Junta de Planificación	Julio Lassús Ruiz	PNP	22 December 2021 – 2 January 2025
Director of the Office of Management and Budget; Directoría de Gerencia y Presupuesto	Juan Carlos Blanco Urrutia	PNP	2 January 2021 – 2 January 2025
Executive Director for Federal Affairs; Directoría Ejecutiva de PRFAA	Jennifer Storipan	PNP	1 August 2019 – 15 January 2021
Executive Director for Federal Affairs; Directoría Ejecutiva de PRFAA	Carmen M. Feliciano	PNP	16 January 2021 – 28 February 2023
Executive Director for Federal Affairs; Directoría Ejecutiva de PRFAA	Luis D. Dávila Pernas	PNP	7 March 2023 - 2 January 2025
=== Council of Secretaries ===
Secretary of State; Secretaría de Estado	Larry Seilhamer Rodríguez	PNP	2 January 2021 – 25 May 2021
Secretary of State; Secretaría de Estado	Omar Marrero Díaz	PNP	12 July 2021 – 2 January 2025
Secretary of Justice; Secretaría de Justicia	Domingo Emanuelli Hernández	PNP	2 January 2021 – 2 January 2025
Secretary of the Treasury; Secretaría de Hacienda	Francisco Parés Alicea	Ind.	24 June 2019 – 2 January 2025
Secretary of Education; Secretaría de Educación	Elba Aponte Santos	Ind. (Note: Elba Aponte Santos was the president of the Teacher's Association before her nomination to the position, and before her being in office no clear ties indicating her membership in the PNP were observed.)	2 January 2021 – 17 April 2021
Secretary of Education; Secretaría de Educación	Magaly Rivera Rivera	PNP	22 April 2021 – 21 May 2021
Secretary of Education; Secretaría de Educación	Eliezer Ramos Parés	PNP	21 May 2021 – 30 June 2023
Secretary of Education; Secretaría de Educación	Ángel Toledo López	PNP	1 July 2023 – 7 July 2023
Secretary of Education; Secretaría de Educación	Yanira Raíces Vega	PNP	10 July 2023 – 2 January 2025
Secretary of Labor and Human Resources; Secretaría del Trabajo y Recursos Humanos	Carlos Rivera Santiago	PNP	9 June 2020 – 31 December 2021
Secretary of Labor and Human Resources; Secretaría del Trabajo y Recursos Humanos	Gabriel Maldonado González	PNP	9 January 2022 – 2 January 2025
Secretary of Transportation and Public Works; Secretaría de Transportación y Obras Públicas	Eileen Vélez Vega	PNP	2 January 2021 – 2 January 2025
Secretary of Economic Development and Commerce; Secretaría de Desarrollo Económico y Comercio	Manuel Cidre Miranda	Ind.	2 January 2021 – 2 January 2025
Secretary of Health; Secretaría de Salud	Carlos Mellado López	PNP	2 January 2021 – 2 January 2025
Secretary of Agriculture; Secretaría de Agricultura	Ramón "Pirul" González Beiró	PNP	2 January 2021 – 2 January 2025
Secretary of Consumer Affairs; Secretaría de Asuntos del Consumidor	Edan Rivera Rodríguez	PNP	2 January 2021 – 2 January 2025
Secretary of Corrections and Rehabilitation; Secretaría de Corrección y Rehabilitación	Ana Escobar Pabón	PNP	2 January 2021 – P2 January 2025esent
Secretary of Family Affairs; Secretaría de la Familia	Carmen Ana González Magaz	PNP	2 January 2021 – 2 January 2025
Secretary of Housing; Secretaría de Vivienda	William Rodríguez Rodríguez	PNP	2 January 2021 – 2 January 2025
Secretary of Natural and Environmental Resources; Secretaría de Recursos Naturales y Ambientales	Rafael Machargo Maldonado	PNP	7 February 2020 – 31 March 2022
Secretary of Natural and Environmental Resources; Secretaría de Recursos Naturales y Ambientales	Anaís Rodríguez Vega (acting)	PNP	1 April 2022 – 2 January 2025
Secretary of Public Safety; Secretaría de Seguridad Pública	Alexis Torres Ríos	PNP	2 January 2021 – 2 January 2025
Secretary of Sports and Recreation; Secretaría de Deportes y Recreación	Ray Quiñones Vázquez	PNP	2 January 2021 – 2 January 2025
=== Other Cabinet-level officers ===
Inspector General; Inspectoría General	Ivelisse Torres Rivera	PNP	16 January 2019 – 2 January 2025
Executive Director of the Puerto Rico Fiscal Agency and Financial Advisory Authority; Directoría Ejecutiva de la Autoridad de Asesoría Financiera y Agencia Fiscal de Puerto Rico	Omar J. Marrero Díaz	PNP	31 July 2019 – 2 January 2025

== Notes ==
Preceded by Vázquez Garced (2019-2021)	Government of Puerto Rico; 2021–2025	Succeeded by González Colón (2025–present)
