= 2012 Puerto Rico government transition process =

Held in Puerto Rico on November 13, 2012

Process overview
- Formed: November 13, 2012; 13 years ago
- Preceding Process: 2008 government transition process
- Dissolved: By or before December 31, 2012; 13 years ago
- Jurisdiction: executive branch
- Headquarters: Department of State
- Process executives: Kenneth McClintock, Outgoing President; Miguel Romero, Outgoing Executive Director; Dolores Rodríguez de Oronoz, Incoming President & Executive Director; Ingrid Vila Biaggi, Incoming Vice President
- Key document: Law No. 197 of 2002
- Website: www.leydetransicion2012.pr.gov www.transicionpuertorico.com

The 2012 Puerto Rico government transition process is the ongoing process in Puerto Rico regarding the government transition between the outgoing governorship of incumbent Governor Luis Fortuño and the incoming governorship of Alejandro García Padilla, governor-elect. The process is mandated and regulated by Law No. 197 of 2002 and started on November 13, 2012, three working days after the Puerto Rican general election of 2012 as the law requires, once García Padilla was preliminarily certified as Governor-elect by the State Elections Commission.

As expected, the process has unveiled discrepancies between what the incumbent administration portrayed in the media and what the current status of the government of Puerto Rico truly is; in particular its Consolidated Fund, budget balance, labor statistics, and performance and metrics.

== Outgoing Committee ==
The 2012 Puerto Rico Outgoing Committee on Government Transition is the committee in charge of the transition process on behalf of the incumbent administration of Governor Luis Fortuño. The Committee is composed of government officers from Fortuño's administration, including, as required by law:

style="margin: 0 auto"

Name	Position	Organization
Guillermo Somoza	Secretary of Justice	Department of Justice
Jesús F. Méndez	Secretary of Treasury	Department of Treasury
Juan C. Batlle	President	Government Development Bank
Juan Carlos Pavía	Director	Office of Management and Budget
Kenneth McClintock	Secretary of State	Department of State
Miguel Romero	Chief of Staff	Secretariat of Governance
Rubén A. Hernández Gregorat	Secretary of Transportation and Public Works	Department of Transportation and Public Works
Rubén Flores Marzán	President	Planning Board

McClintock serves as the Outgoing Committee's president while Romero serves as its executive director.

== Incoming Committee ==
The 2012 Puerto Rico Incoming Committee on Government Transition is the committee in charge of the transition process on behalf of Alejandro García Padilla, Governor-elect. The Committee is composed of aides and assistants of García Padilla, as follows:

style="margin: 0 auto"

Name	Position	Remarks
Alberto Bacó Bagué	Member	former Director of the Economic Development Bank and former Executive Vice President of the Government Development Bank
Celeste Freytes	Member	former Vice President of Academic Affairs of the University of Puerto Rico
David H. Chafey Jr.	Member	former President of Banco Popular
Dolores Rodríguez de Oronoz	President & Executive Director	former Appeals Justice and advisor on Rafael Hernández Colón's Office of the Governor
Ingrid Vila Biaggi	Vice President	former sub-Secretary of Government for Sila Maria Calderón
Jorge Sánchez	Member	former rector of the University of Puerto Rico, Medical Sciences Campus
José A. Andréu Fuentes	Member	former legal officer for Chief Justice Víctor Pons
Juan Acosta Reboyras	Member	former member of the Board of First Bank Puerto Rico
Juan B. Aponte	Member	Emeritus Professor of the University of Puerto Rico
Palmira N. Ríos González	Member	former President of the Commission on Civil Rights
Roberto Pagán Rodríguez	Member	President of the Puerto Rican Workers Union
Salvador Antonetti Zequeira	Member	former Secretary of the Board of Trustees of the University of Puerto Rico

Rodríguez de Oronoz serves as both the Incoming Committee's President and Executive Director while Vila Biaggi serves as its Vice President.

== Controversial issues ==
In November 16, 2012, the Outgoing Committee admitted in public hearing that the Puerto Rico General Fund was not in fact as robust as previously informed by the incumbent administration. One hearing after, the public hearing unveiled a higher deficit in the Puerto Rico government budget balance for the upcoming fiscal year of $1.1 billion USD$ instead of the $330 million that were previously reported, effectively making the deficit almost three times higher than previously reported and unveiling a cash flow insolvency on the Department of Treasury.
