= Luis F. Cruz =

Puerto Rican politician

Director Puerto Rico Office of Management and Budget
- Incumbent
- Assumed office October 14, 2014 (12 years ago)
- Governor: Alejandro García Padilla
- Preceded by: Carlos Rivas Quiñones
- Succeeded by: Jose I. Marrero Rosado

Director Commission on Treasury and Budget 29th House of Representatives of Puerto Rico
- In office January 14, 2013 – October 14, 2014

Partner Cruz, Izaguirre & Co.
- Incumbent
- Assumed office 1994

Personal details
- Born: Luis F. Cruz Batista
- Party: PPD
- Education: University of Puerto Rico (BBA) Interamerican University of Puerto Rico (MBA)
- Occupation: certified public accountant (CPA)

Luis F. Cruz Batista (Note: In this Spanish name, the first or paternal surname is Cruz and the second or maternal family name is Batista.) is a certified public accountant and the current director of the Puerto Rico Office of Management and Budget (OGP in Spanish). Before his appointment Cruz served as director of the Commission on Treasury and Budget of the 29th House of Representatives. He had also run his own private accounting firm since 1994 and had previously offered consulting services to OGP as a private consultant.

Academically, Cruz possesses a bachelor's degree in accounting from the University of Puerto Rico and a master's degree from the Interamerican University of Puerto Rico.
