= Colegio San Ignacio de Loyola (San Juan) =

College preparatory school in San Juan, Puerto Rico

Location
- San Juan, Puerto Rico 00927; 18°22′34″N 66°5′15″W

Information
- Type: Private, Catholic (Jesuit) Non-profit All-male Secondary (Grade 7-12) education institution
- Motto: Fortes in Fide (Latin) (Strong in Faith)
- Established: 1952; 74 years ago
- President: Fr. Timothy A. Howe, S.J. (2018–present)
- Principal: María Isabel Domenech
- Faculty: 83
- Enrollment: 600+
- Athletics conference: Puerto Rico High School Athletic Alliance
- Newspaper: El Ignaciano
- Yearbook: The Shield
- Affiliation: MSACS
- Website: www.sanignacio.pr

Colegio San Ignacio de Loyola is a private, Catholic, Jesuit, all-male college-preparatory school run by the U.S. Central and Southern Province of the Society of Jesus in San Juan, Puerto Rico. It was founded by the Jesuits in 1952. It has educated several influential figures in Puerto Rico, including Fernando Picó, Ruben Berrios and Raúl Juliá.

== Location ==
The school was originally located in Santurce but the Jesuits moved it to its current location in San Juan, Rio Piedras in 1955. Colegio San Ignacio resembles a small university campus as it has several buildings: two identical buildings consisting of classrooms, named San Luis Gonzaga (formerly "Building A") and San Francisco Javier (formerly "Building B"); one building with a computer center on the first floor and a humanities library on the second floor; the Padre Pedro Arrupe Building which houses classrooms and offices; the cafeteria building; "Building C" which houses the science classrooms and laboratories and a science and math resource center; the Complejo Cultural, a state-of-the-art humanities building completed in the year 2004 which houses English, Spanish, music, drama, and oratory classrooms and an auditorium; the administration building which houses most of the administrative staff.

== Academics ==
Colegio San Ignacio de Loyola seeks to offer a superior, Catholic education in the Jesuit tradition to all young men who show aptitude, motivation, and their families' support, and so to serve society and announce the Kingdom of God.

The school has programs in waste reduction, agroecology, water conservation, and reduction of plastic bottling and consistently receives Eco-School certification from The Organization for Sustainable Environment.

San Ignacio participates in the Jesuit Virtual Learning program. It also has a special program for gifted students, with administrative and teaching staff trained at the University of Connecticut. Nine advanced placement courses are offered.

== Pastoral program ==
All students participate in a retreat experience each year, culminating in a 4-day Kairos retreat offered to those in 12th grade. The school celebrates the Eucharist each morning before classes; students may attend if they wish. A Family Formation Program offers talks, workshops, and Ignatian spirituality experiences to assist parents in raising adolescents in today's world. Service opportunities include tutoring at public schools, assisting at a center for special education, a home for abused children, and a home for the elderly, and work on environmentalism. For service opportunities, some join the Friends of Jesus and Peer Ministers groups.

== School anthem ==
Translated from Spanish:

Lion of my shield, martial and rampant,

raise your eyes and light the path

that gives life. With your warrior chest

advance each step, forward to triumph.

Already you strained your body, hard as granite.

On steady foot raised from the ground,

rhythmically beating, you advance with a roaring scream, the march of war.

Undaunted in battle who can frighten you?

You will see at your advance on all sides

the fierce enemy will fall

before the radiance of your regal banner.

== Athletics and activities ==
San Ignacio participates in the Puerto Rico High School Athletic Alliance in football, basketball, baseball, bowling, cross country, golf, indoor soccer, swimming, track and field, tennis, and volleyball.

Students organizations include Student Council, Chorus, National Honor Society, Peer Ministers, and Cultural Tours. Clubs are sponsored in areas such as school band, debate, United Nations, chess, art, science, medicine, theater, cinema, mathematics, technology, ECO-Ignatian, business, investors, robotics, photography, French, history, and engineering.

== Notable alumni ==
=== Academia ===
- Fernando Pico, class of 1958, historian and Jesuit, specialist on the history of Puerto Rico

=== Arts, education, & publicity ===
- Raúl Juliá, actor, class of 1957
- Eduardo Lalo, writer, photographer and filmmaker, class of 1977
- Armando Riesco, actor, class of 1995
- Alfredo De Quesada, actor, class of 1994
- Jorge Rodriguez Beruff, historian, author and dean: UPR General Studies Faculty
- Héctor Feliciano, journalist, author, professor, class of 1970
- Rafael Luis Bras, Provost of the Georgia Institute of Technology
- Felix V. Matos Rodriguez, Chancellor of City University of New York, former President of Queens College, City University of New York, historian, former Secretary of the Puerto Rico Department of Family Affairs, class of 1980
- Carlos Fonseca Suárez, author

=== Politics ===
- Ruben Berrios Martinez, Class of 1957; President of the Puerto Rican Independence Party, former Senator and gubernatorial candidate
- Rafael Cox Alomar, 2012 candidate for Resident Commissioner for the Popular Democratic Party.
- Fernando Martín García, Executive President of the Puerto Rican Independence Party, former Senator
- José Ramón Oyola, class of 1968, President of the Puerto Rico Government Development Bank (1985–1986)
- Luis G. Rivera Marín, Class of 1978; Secretary of State of Puerto Rico (2017-2019), Secretary of the Puerto Rico Department of Consumer Affairs (2009–2012), Executive Director, Puerto Rico Tourism Company (2012–present)
- Rafael Bernabe Riefkohl, Class of 1977; 2012 gubernatorial candidate for the Puerto Rican Workers' Party
- Gabriel Guerra-Mondragón, Class of 1959; United States Ambassador to Chile (1994-1998)

=== Science & Healthcare ===
- Ramón Louis Lavandero Bertucci, Class of 1966, first male graduate of Columbia University School of Nursing, senior director of American Association of Critical-Care Nurses
- Daniel Colón-Ramos, Class of 1994, McConnell Duberg Professor of Neuroscience and Cell Biology at Yale University School of Medicine, member National Academy of Medicine

== See also ==
- List of Jesuit sites
