= Javier González (politician) =

Puerto Rican politician

Acting Secretary of State of Puerto Rico
- In office October 30, 2015 – December 9, 2015
- Governor: Alejandro García Padilla
- Preceded by: David Bernier
- Succeeded by: Víctor Suárez Meléndez

Personal details
- Born: Puerto Rico, U.S.
- Party: Popular Democratic Party
- Other political affiliations: Democratic

Javier Benito González Arroyo is a Puerto Rican politician who served as the acting Secretary of State of Puerto Rico from October 2015 until December 2015, after the resignation of David Bernier. Prior to that, he served as Deputy Secretary of State of Puerto Rico. He is a member of the Popular Democratic Party (PDP).

On October 21, 2015 González, as Deputy Secretary of State, witnessed a deal with Taiwan that allowed citizens of both countries to obtain a driver's license in the other country.

González served as acting Secretary of State of Puerto Rico from October 30, 2015 until December 9, 2015. He was succeeded by Víctor Suárez.
