= Miguel Torres =

Miguel Torres may refer to:

- Miguel Torres (actor) (1926–1962), Brazilian footballer, writer, and actor
- Miguel A. Torres (born 1941), president of Bodegas Torres
- Miguel Torres (swimmer) (born 1946), Spanish swimmer
- Miguel Torres (fighter) (born 1981), American mixed martial artist
- Miguel Torres (footballer, born 1982), Peruvian footballer
- Miguel Torres (footballer, born 1986), Spanish footballer
- Miguel Torres Díaz, Secretary of Transportation and Public Works of Puerto Rico
