= Ingrid Rivera =

Ingrid Rivera may refer to:

- Ingrid Marie Rivera (b. 1983), a Puerto Rican beauty pageant titleholder
- Ingrid Rivera Rocafort, a marketing professional and the current executive director of the Puerto Rico Tourism Company
