= Guillermo Irizarry =

Puerto Rican politician

Secretary of State of Puerto Rico
- In office 1966 – January 2, 1969
- Governor: Roberto Sánchez Vilella
- Preceded by: Carlos J. Lastra
- Succeeded by: Carlos Fernando Chardón

Director Puerto Rico Office of Management and Budget
- In office 1961–1966
- Governor: Luis Muñoz Marín
- Preceded by: Ramón García Santiago
- Succeeded by: Elías Rivera Cidraz

Personal details
- Born: April 12, 1916 Mayagüez, Puerto Rico
- Died: November 21, 2017 (aged 101) San Juan, Puerto Rico
- Party: Popular Democratic Party
- Other political affiliations: Democratic
- Spouse(s): married to Carmen Eva Ramirez Rubio since October 14, 1942. They have 2 daughters Attorney Carmencita Irizarry, married to Federal Judge Daniel Dominguez & Professor Margarita Irizarry, married to Professor Fernando Diaz
- Education: University of Puerto Rico at Mayaguez; University of Louisiana (MBA)

Military service
- Allegiance: United States of America
- Branch/service: United States Army
- Years of service: 1943–1946
- Rank: Technician fifth grade

Guillermo Irizarry-Rubio (April 12, 1916 – November 21, 2017) was a Puerto Rican politician who served as the Secretary of State of Puerto Rico. Appointed by Governor Roberto Sánchez Vilella, he served from 1966 to January 2, 1969, when he was responsible and led the first transition team under the Puerto Rican Constitution to the opposing political party. Prior to serving as Secretary of State, which includes the role of Lieutenant Governor of Puerto Rico, Irizarry served as head of Puerto Rico's Bureau of the Budget.

== Early life ==
Guillermo Irizarry Rubio was born in Mayagüez, Puerto Rico on April 12, 1916. The sixth child of a printer, he started working early in his father's business. He graduated magna cum laude from the University of Puerto Rico at Mayaguez in May, 1939 with a degree in agronomy. At the time Puerto Rico was still undergoing significant economic hardship, the result of Hurricane San Felipe in 1928. In June 1939, at the request of Carlos Esteva, then Director of the Tobacco Institute, he had his first official job at an experimental station that had been recently established in Puerto Rico. Employment opportunities were still difficult, but some jobs were by then being created on the island as a result of Luis Muñoz Marín's initiative for Puerto Rico, which joined in the type of social programs that President Franklin D. Roosevelt had implemented in the United States.

== Military service and education ==
Guillermo Irizarry served in the United States Army during World War II, Irizarry had a 1A classification, which meant under the military categories, that he could be called for active military service immediately. By 1943, Irizarry had officially joined the United States military where he continued serving until July, 1946. Served as Technician fifth grade. After his military service Irizarry offered guidance in the Veterans Administration, but a fortunate meeting with the then Secretary of Business and Agriculture, Ramón Colón Torres, leads to him completing a master's degree in Business Administration from the University of Louisiana in 1950 and rejoining the Agriculture Department of Puerto Rico that same year. On behalf of the Puerto Rico Industrial Development Company, he participated in the process that lead Harold Toppel and brother George Toppel to establish the first supermarket in Puerto Rico, Pueblo.

== Career ==
In 1960 he was named the Director of the Office of Management and Budget of the Government of Puerto Rico, where he continued to serve past the end of the term of then Governor Muñoz on January 2, 1965, and until December, 1966 when then Governor Roberto Sánchez Vilella nominated him to become Secretary of State of Puerto Rico. It was as Secretary of State of Puerto Rico that he represented the People of Puerto Rico at the Funeral of Martin Luther King Jr.

He served as Secretary of State, and provided needed stability to the government of Puerto Rico, during one of Puerto Rico's most tumultuous times. During his term, Gov. Sánchez Vilella's relationship with his predecessor and first elected governor, Luis Muñoz Marín, deteriorated almost as rapidly as the governor's marriage to the First Lady, which ended in the first divorce of a sitting governor and remarriage to the governor's chief of staff. Politically, the governor abandoned the party that elected him, the Popular Democratic Party of Puerto Rico (PDP), and joined a newly founded party, the People's Party, which nominated him for an unsuccessful reelection bid. In November of that year, the PDP suffered its first defeat with the election of the New Progressive Party's Luis A. Ferré. As a result, Secretary Irizarry presided over the first transition between elected governors of different parties.

From 1973 to 1977, during the administration of Governor Rafael Hernández Colón, Irizarry served again the People of Puerto Rico as a member of the Higher Education Counsel. Within the education arena he also served as the first President of the General Education Counsel from 1985 until 1990.

== Death ==
Irizarry died in San Juan in November 2017 at the age of 101.

== Publications ==
La Organización gubernamental en Puerto Rico-by Guillermo Irizarry-Rubio, Director, Bureau of the Budget, Puerto Rico, 1962

== Honors ==
On June 12, 2015, the University of Puerto Rico at Mayagüez conferred a Doctorate Honoris Causa for Irizarry's lifetime of service to Puerto Rico.

The Colegio de Agrónomos, the mandatory-membership guild of agronomists that he co-founded in 1940, will honor his legacy of public service on June 19 in San Juan, Puerto Rico.

Political offices
Preceded by Carlos J. Lastra	Secretary of State of Puerto Rico; 1965–1966	Succeeded by Carlos Fernando Chardón

== Sources ==
- http://www.vozdelcentro.org/tag/guillermo-irizarry-rubio/
- http://www.vozdelcentro.org/2012/10/28/lmmrsv-el-desarrollo-del-ela-y-el-proposito-de-puerto-rico
