= Antonio Colorado =

13th Secretary of State of Puerto Rico

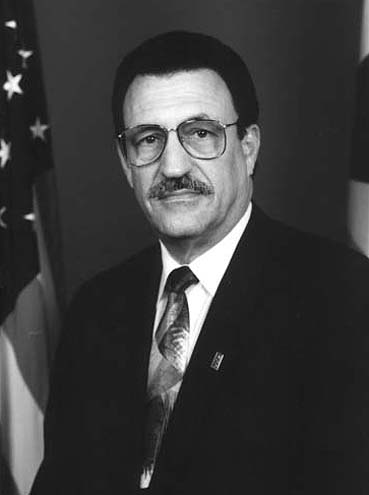

Resident Commissioner of Puerto Rico
- In office February 21, 1992 – January 3, 1993 (Note: Colorado's official service begins on the date of the special election, while he was not sworn in until March 4, 1992.)
- Preceded by: Jaime Fuster
- Succeeded by: Carlos Romero Barceló

Secretary of State of Puerto Rico
- In office 1990 – March 4, 1992
- Governor: Rafael Hernández Colón
- Preceded by: Sila Calderón
- Succeeded by: Salvador M. Padilla Escabi

Personal details
- Born: Antonio José Colorado Laguna; September 8, 1939 (age 86) New York City, New York, U.S.
- Party: Popular Democratic
- Other political affiliations: Democratic
- Spouse: Delia Castillo (m. 1965)
- Children: 3
- Education: Boston University (BS); University of Puerto Rico (JD); Harvard University (LLM)

Antonio José Colorado Laguna (born September 8, 1939) is an American lawyer and politician from New York. He served as Secretary of State of Puerto Rico and Resident Commissioner of Puerto Rico for the administration of Rafael Hernández Colón.

== Biography ==
Colorado attended elementary and high school in Puerto Rico. In 1962, he earned a bachelor's degree from Boston University and three years later graduated from the University of Puerto Rico School of Law with a Juris Doctor. In 1966, he earned a master of Laws from the Harvard Law School and was admitted to the Puerto Rican bar. He is a member of Phi Sigma Alpha fraternity.

From 1966 to 1968 he served as legal tax adviser to the Puerto Rico Economic Development Administration, and from 1968 to 1969 he served as the executive assistant to the economic development administrator of Puerto Rico. He began a law practice in 1969, and became a member of the Puerto Rico Tax Reform Commission Subcommittee in 1973.

In the late 1970s, in addition to his law practice, he lectured at both the University of Puerto Rico at Rio Piedras and the Interamerican University of Puerto Rico. In 1985, then Governor of Puerto Rico, Rafael Hernández Colón, appointed Colorado to the post of administrator of economic development. From 1990 to 1992 he served as Secretary of State for Puerto Rico.

In 1992, Colorado was appointed Resident Commissioner to fill the vacancy caused by the resignation of Jaime B. Fuster, who was appointed associate justice of the Supreme Court of Puerto Rico. In the United States House of Representatives Colorado tried to address problems faced by Puerto Ricans, such as crime and drug abuse, and requested additional medicaid support for the Island.

He was unsuccessful in his 1992 bid for election and returned to San Juan, Puerto Rico. He served as Executive Director of the Local Redevelopment Authority for the former Roosevelt Roads Naval Station in Ceiba, Puerto Rico, a facility that was abandoned by the United States Navy after naval shelling practices ended in nearby Vieques, Puerto Rico.

== See also ==
- List of Hispanic Americans in the United States Congress

Political offices
Preceded by Sila Calderón	Secretary of State of Puerto Rico; 1990–1992	Succeeded by Salvador M. Padilla Escabi
U.S. House of Representatives
Preceded by Jaime Fuster	Resident Commissioner of Puerto Rico; 1992–1993	Succeeded by Carlos Romero Barceló
