= Salvador M. Padilla Escabi =

United States Army general

Secretary of State of Puerto Rico
- In office 1992-1993
- Governor: Rafael Hernandez Colon
- Preceded by: Antonio J. Colorado
- Succeeded by: Baltasar Corrada del Rio

Adjutant General of Puerto Rico
- In office 1975–1977
- Governor: Rafael Hernandez Colon
- Preceded by: Carlos Fernando Chardón
- Succeeded by: Orlando Llenza

Personal details
- Born: September 19, 1924 Cabo Rojo, Puerto Rico
- Died: July 21, 2010 (aged 85) Hato Rey, Puerto Rico
- Party: New Progressive Party
- Other political affiliations: Democratic
- Education: University of Puerto Rico at Mayagüez (BAgr); University of Cornell (PhD)

Military service
- Allegiance: United States of America
- Branch/service: United States Army Reserve United States Army Army National Guard
- Years of service: 1942-1977
- Rank: Major General
- Commands: 92nd Infantry Brigade (Separate); Puerto Rico Adjutant General
- Awards: American Defense Service Medal; American Campaign Medal

Salvador Padilla (September 19, 1924 – July 21, 2010), was a Puerto Rican politician who served as Puerto Rico Governor Rafael Hernandez Colon's last Secretary of State of Puerto Rico from January 1992 to January 2, 1993.

== Education ==
Padilla Escabi studied in the school's public system and then earned a BA in agriculture and mechanical arts from the University of Puerto Rico at Mayagüez, where he joined Phi Sigma Alpha fraternity. He then graduated from the Cornell University College of Architecture, Art, and Planning and in 1958 is the first Puerto Rican to get a PhD in planning.

== Military career ==
Salvador Padilla began his military career by enlisting in the United States Army Reserve in 1942 making it to the rank of Sergeant. He earned his commission as a 2nd lieutenant via the Army Officer Candidate School at Fort Benning, Georgia. He commanded the 92nd Infantry Brigade (Separate). In 1975 he was appointed Puerto Rico Adjutant General of the Puerto Rico National Guard. He was the founder of the Language Center at Fort Allen, Puerto Rico. Mayor General Salvador M. Padilla retired from the Puerto Rico National Guard in 1977.

Professionally, General Padilla was an engineer and planner. He was the author of several planning studies relating to Puerto Rico.

== Death ==
Salvador M. Padilla Escabi died on July 21, 2010, in Hato Rey, Puerto Rico, at age 85. He was buried at San Miguel Arcangel Cemetery, in Cabo Rojo, Puerto Rico.

== Legacy ==
In 2011 the Armed Forces Reserve Center at Fort Allen, Puerto Rico was inaugurated and dedicated posthumously as Mayor General Salvador M. Padilla Escabi Armed Forces Reserve Center.

He was inducted to the United States Army Officer Candidate School Alumni Association Hall of Fame.

== Publications ==
•Air rights : potencial uses of air space in Puerto Rico above and below public transportation routes by Salvador M. Padilla y Asociados. San Juan, P.R. : Dept. of Transportation and Public Works, 1975.

•San Juan Metropolitan Area Transportation Study : highway plan update 1995 by Salvador M. Padilla y Asociados. San Juan, Puerto Rico : Puerto Rico Highway Authority, 1975.

•Isla Mona land use schemes for the petroleum base project by Salvador M. Padilla y Asociados. Hato Rey, P.R. : SMP, 1974.

•A general neighborhood renewal plan for the eastern central area of Mayagüez, Puerto Rico by Puerto Rico. Administración de Renovación Urbana y Vivienda. Río Piedras, P.R. : The Administration, 1965.

•A general neighborhood renewal plan for the eastern central area of Mayagüez, Puerto Rico by Puerto Rico. Departamento de la Vivienda. Río Piedras, P.R. : The Administration, 1965.

== Sources ==
http://hip.upr.edu:85/ipac20/ipac.jsp?session=1279Q3HJ90390.62017&profile=de&uri=link=3100006~!149388~!3100001~!3100002&aspect=subtab229&menu=search&ri=3&source=~!uprbib&term=Salvador+M.+Padilla+y+Asociados.&index=AUTHOR

Political offices
Preceded by Antonio J. Colorado	Secretary of State of Puerto Rico; 1992-1993	Succeeded by Baltasar Corrada del Rio
Military offices
Preceded by Major General Carlos Fernando Chardón	Adjutant General of the Puerto Rico National Guard; Under Governor Rafael Hernández Colón; 1975–1977	Succeeded by Major General Orlando Llenza
