= Víctor Suárez Meléndez =

Puerto Rican politician

Secretary of State of Puerto Rico
- In office December 9, 2015 – January 2, 2017
- Governor: Alejandro García Padilla
- Preceded by: Javier González (Acting)
- Succeeded by: Luis Rivera Marín

Puerto Rico Chief of Staff
- In office September 19, 2014 – December 9, 2015
- Governor: Alejandro García Padilla
- Preceded by: Ingrid Vila Biaggi
- Succeeded by: Grace Santana Balado

Secretary of Consumer Affairs of Puerto Rico
- In office 2008–2009
- Governor: Anibal Acevedo Vilá

Personal details
- Party: Popular Democratic Party
- Other political affiliations: Democratic
- Education: University of Puerto Rico, Río; Piedras (BS); Polytechnic University of Puerto Rico; University of Puerto Rico, Mayagüez (MS); Pontifical Catholic University of Puerto Rico School of Law (JD)

Víctor A. Suárez Meléndez is a Puerto Rican lawyer and politician who was the Secretary of State of Puerto Rico, as well as being the current executive director of the Puerto Rico Convention Center District Authority. Prior to his current position, Suárez served in various roles in public service, including as executive director of the Puerto Rico Ports Authority, as Secretary of Consumer Affairs, as deputy mayor of Carolina, and as Puerto Rico Chief of Staff. Before he joined the government, Suárez worked as an operations manager for Colgate-Palmolive and as a private-practice lawyer. He also worked as a consultant for various public and private entities in matters such as process reengineering, projects management, organizational restructuring and development of efficiency indicators. On June 29, 2006 Víctor Suárez Meléndez was appointed vice mayor of Carolina, Puerto Rico.

Academically, Suárez holds a bachelor's degree in chemical engineering from the University of Puerto Rico, a master's degree in engineering management from the Polytechnic University of Puerto Rico and a juris doctor from the Pontifical Catholic University of Puerto Rico.

On the day of his appointment as chief of staff, Metro reported that Suárez's appointment responded to, "strategies made by the governor's staff to position [the governor] for re-election." (Note: Metro (2014; in Spanish) "El nombramiento de Suárez, quien aún se desempeña como director ejecutivo de la Autoridad de Puertos y de la Autoridad del Distrito del Centro de Convenciones, responde a unas estrategias que realiza el equipo de trabajo del primer mandatario para posicionarlo como un candidato reelegible para las próximas elecciones.")

== Secretary of Consumer Affairs ==
After serving as Deputy Secretary to Consumer Affairs Secretary Alejandro García Padilla, Governor Aníbal Acevedo Vilá appointed Suárez as Secretary after García Padilla resigned to run for Senator At-Large in the 2008 PDP primary and the general election of that year.

== Convention District Authority ==
Since his appointment as Convention Center District Authority Director, Victor Suarez, has transformed the Puerto Rico Convention District by signing contracts to develop restaurants, commercial space and three new hotels that will add 500 new hotel rooms to the district. Private developers are investing $123 million into the Convention District as part of Suarez plan to develop the convention industry in the island. Victor Suarez also achieved to eliminate the Convention District yearly deficit of $3.5 million by implementing spending control measures.

== Ports Authority ==
As Executive Director of the Puerto Rico Ports Authority Victor Suarez reduced its annual deficit by implementing spending control measures and implementing business development initiatives in the public corporation. By the end of his mandate the Ports Authority achieved its first balance budget with no deficit in the past decade.

Public-Private Partnership of Luis Munoz Marin International Airport – In February 2013 Victor Suarez signed a contract with Aerostar Airport Holdings for the private operation of the Luis Munoz Marin International Airport. Aerostar made an initial payment to Puerto Rico's government of $615 million, through $350 million in investment-grade bonds and $265 million in equity. It makes additional payments of $2.5 million annually for the next five years. It would then pay 5 percent of airport revenues for 25 years and 10 percent for the remaining decade of the contract.

The 40-year deal with Aerostar Airport Holdings contains clauses to give the Ports Authority the "resources necessary to invest in Puerto Rico's ports and regional airports, two areas with critical infrastructure needs.

As part of the deal Victor Suarez signed Aerostar is in the process of investing $250 million in the first four years on improvements including centralizing check-ins and adding 35,000 square feet (3,250 square meters) of retail area. It plans to spend a total of $1.4 billion on capital improvements over the next 40 years and set aside $6 million in an escrow account to reward airlines that increase their service in the first three years of the agreement.

Lufthansa Technik Puerto Rico – In April 2014 Executive Director Víctor Suárez signed a 40-year lease agreement with Lufthansa Technik to launch a new aviation maintenance, repair and overhaul (MRO) facility in Puerto Rico. This was a major new step for Lufthansa Technik to expand its involvement in America. The new company, Lufthansa Technik Puerto Rico (LTPR), will be based at Rafael Hernández International Airport in Aguadilla, a former U.S. Air Force base located on the northwest of the island.

With this deal Victor Suarez opened the door to a new aerospace industry sector in Puerto Rico.

Puerto Rico Regional Airport System – In 2013 Executive Director Victor Suarez announce a plan to develop the Puerto Rico's regional airport system. The plan includes private sector investments and infrastructure development.

== Secretary of State ==
As Secretary of State, Suárez serves as Puerto Rico's Lieutenant Governor. Since he currently serves in a recess appointment, lacking and awaiting the advice and consent of the Puerto Rico Senate and the Puerto Rico House of Representatives, he steps in as Acting Governor whenever Governor Alejandro García Padilla is off the islands. However, should a permanent vacancy arise, and until he is confirmed, the Attorney General would fill a permanent vacancy. As it is, Suárez has repeatedly served as Acting Governor, as the governor has spent significant time in Washington, DC, focused on resolving Puerto Rico's 2015 fiscal crisis. After Deputy Secretary Javier González' resignation became effective on December 15, Suárez installed his team at the State Department.

== Notes ==
Political offices
Preceded by Javier González; Acting	Secretary of State of Puerto Rico; 2015–2017	Succeeded by Luis Rivera Marín
