= Ingrid Vila Biaggi =

Former Puerto Rico Chief of Staff

Chief of Staff
- In office January 2, 2013 – September 19, 2014
- Governor: Alejandro García Padilla
- Preceded by: Miguel Romero
- Succeeded by: Víctor Suárez

Vice President 2012 Incoming Committee on Government Transition
- In office November 14, 2012 – December 31, 2012

Deputy Chief of Staff
- In office January 2, 2001 – January 1, 2005

Personal details
- Born: Ingrid Marie Vila Biaggi; 1974 (52 years old)
- Party: Unaffiliated
- Spouse: Luis Enrique Rodríguez
- Children: Ingrid Elisse Lauren Marie
- Education: Cornell University (BS); Stanford University (M.E.)
- Occupation: project manager civil engineer environmental engineer

Ingrid Marie Vila Biaggi is a civil and environmental engineer and former Puerto Rico Chief of Staff. Previous to her position as Chief of Staff, Vila served as Deputy Chief of Staff for the governorship of Sila Maria Calderón from 2001 to 2005. She holds a bachelor's degree in civil and environmental engineering from Cornell University, and a master's degree in the same field from Stanford University. In her private life Vila has offered consulting services in project management to the Puerto Rico Aqueducts and Sewers Authority.

== Personal life ==
Vila Biaggi is the daughter of Ingrid Arlene Biaggi and Enrique Vila del Corral, a certified public accountant. She married Luis Enrique Rodríguez, a professor of law at the University of Puerto Rico School of Law and former Secretary of Natural and Environmental Resources, in 2002. They have two daughters, Ingrid Elisse (born in 2004) and Lauren Marie (born in 2008).
