= Javier Ferrer Fernández =

Cuban-born American politician

Javier D. Ferrer

President of the Puerto Rico Government Development Bank
- In office January 2, 2013 – July 2013
- Governor: Alejandro García Padilla
- Preceded by: Juan C. Batlle
- Succeeded by: José Pagán Beauchamp

Personal details
- Born: December 29, 1961 (age 64) Havana, Cuba
- Party: Popular Democratic Party
- Spouse: Blanca P. Escudero
- Children: 5
- Education: Harvard University (BA); Boston College (JD)

Javier D. Ferrer Fernández (born December 29, 1961) is a Cuban-American lawyer, financial advisor, businessman and politician who served as President and member of the board of the Puerto Rico Government Development Bank for Governor Alejandro García Padilla.

He graduated from Harvard University with a Bachelor of Arts degree in 1983 and from Boston College Law School with a Juris Doctor in 1986. After graduating from law school he practiced law with Kutak, Rock & Campbell from 1986 to 1988. From 1988 to 1989 he practiced law with O'Neill & Borges LLC. From 1989 to 1991 he practiced law with Hernandez Mayoral & Ferrer. From 1991 to 1992 he practiced law with McConnell Valdes LLC.

Ferrer is a founding partner of Pietrantoni Méndez & Álvarez LLC which specializes in commercial law, corporate law, corporate finance law, public finance law, commercial lending, and mergers and acquisitions. He practiced law with the firm from 1992 to 2014. He has also served as an advisor to financial institutions. Mr. Ferrer has been distinguished by Chambers as one of the world's best corporate lawyers.

In December 2012, he was appointed head of the Government Development Bank, that serves as government financial advisers.

Mr. Ferrer has been the President and Chief Executive Officer of Popular, Banco Popular de Puerto Rico and Popular Bank, since July 1, 2025. He served as President of Popular, BPPR and Popular Bank since May 2024. and as Chief Operating Officer of Popular and BPPR from January 2022 to June 2025, overseeing all business units in Puerto Rico, the mainland United States and the Virgin Islands, as well as directing the Corporation’s strategic planning and data and analytics functions. Mr. Ferrer has served as Director of BPPR since March 2015 and Director of Popular Bank since April 2024. He also served as Secretary of the Board of Directors of Popular and its banking subsidiaries from October 2014 to May 2024. From October 2014 until December 2021, he was the Executive Vice President, Chief Legal Officer, and General Counsel of Popular.

He is married to Blanca Pujals Escudero and they have 5 children.
