= Alfredo Salazar Jr. =

Puerto Rican banker and public servant

President of the Puerto Rico Government Development Bank
- In office 2005–2007
- Governor: Aníbal Acevedo Vilá
- Preceded by: William Lockwood Benet
- Succeeded by: Jorge Irizarry Herrans

Personal details
- Born: March 10, 1942 San Juan, Puerto Rico
- Died: November 11, 2023 (aged 81) Hato Rey, Puerto Rico
- Party: Popular Democratic Party of Puerto Rico
- Spouse: Camille Toro Torruella
- Education: Villanova University (BEc)

Alfredo Salazar (March 10, 1942, in San Juan, Puerto Rico – November 11, 2023) was an economist by education and a banker by profession. He entered into public service and ran for an elected position affiliated with the Popular Democratic Party of Puerto Rico (PDP). He ran for the office of Resident Commissioner of Puerto Rico in the United States Congress in the 2008 elections. Prior to running for Congress, he served as Chairman and President of the Puerto Rico Government Development Bank (GDB) and financial advisor to the then governor of Puerto Rico, Aníbal Acevedo Vilá. He had previously served as President of the Puerto Rico Industrial Development Company and GDB president during the first administration of Gov. Rafael Hernández Colón in the mid seventies and Head of the Economic Development Administration during Hernández Colón third administration.

== Biography ==
Mr. Salazar devoted most of his professional life to commercial and investment banking. He began working with Banco Popular de Puerto Rico and then moved on to the Chase Manhattan Bank, (today JP Morgan Chase), where he occupied several executive positions including Country Head in Puerto Rico, Argentina and Brazil from 1977 to 1988. In 1989 he was appointed President of Banco de Ponce, the second largest commercial bank in Puerto Rico, just before it merged into Banco Popular.

From 1993 to 1998, Mr. Salazar was based in New York as Managing Director in Investment Banking - Latin America for PaineWebber (today UBS). He then returned to Puerto Rico as President of Palmas del Mar Properties, Inc., the real estate development company of the exclusive residential/resort complex in Humacao. As such, he was responsible for negotiating land leases and overseeing construction of several hundred homes at the resort, as well as amenities such as the golf course and the beach club. Throughout his professional career, Mr. Salazar has occupied several positions in the public sector. From 1971 to 1974, he was appointed Vice President of Finance and later promoted to President and General Manager of the Puerto Rico Industrial Company, Puerto Rico's largest real estate holding company. As Head of this Agency he was responsible for the acquisition, development, construction and management of industrial buildings to accommodate investors from the Mainland and from the Island. Puerto Rico Industrial Development Company owned at the time in excess of 120 million square feet of industrial space in Puerto Rico. In 1975 he transferred to the Government Development Bank for Puerto Rico as its President until 1976 to oversee the Bank's business during one of the most difficult financial crisis in the municipal bond market in the United States. From 1990 to 1992 he was appointed Administrator of the Economic Development Administration, the agency charged with implementing economic development policies on the island. In 2005 he went back to the Government Development Bank as its Chairman and later became its President until 2007. As Head of the bank, Mr. Salazar was responsible for financing major infrastructure projects of the Central Government and its public corporations. Some of these projects include the Coliseum, the Convention Center, several hotels such as Bahia Beach, the Sheraton, and the Condado Trio. In 2008 Mr. Salazar became the candidate of the Popular Democratic Party for the elected position of Resident Commissioner in the United States Congress. After his Party lost the elections, Mr. Salazar returned to the private sector and joined Fundación Carvajal as its Executive Director until 2015. He has been advisor to the Chairman of the Finance Committee in the House of Representatives and to the Speaker of the House.

As one of Puerto Rico's "senior statesmen", Mr. Salazar joined 8 other GDB presidents in supporting HR 870, filed by Resident Commissioner Pedro Pierluisi, to extend Chapter 9 Federal Bankruptcy Code jurisdiction to Puerto Rico's so-called "Public Corporations".

== Education ==
Mr. Salazar had a bachelor's degree in economics from Villanova University. He also did post-graduate course work in Finance at the Stern Graduate School of Business at New York University and the Advanced Management Program at the Harvard Business School in Cambridge, Massachusetts.

== Recognition ==
Among his major accomplishments was the creation of a new GDB subsidiary, COFINA, in October 2007, to place sales tax revenue bonds in the municipal bond market in the United States and refinance about half of Puerto Rico's accumulated extraconstitutional debt. On July 23, 2007, Gov. Acevedo Vilá made it official when he announced that Salazar had agreed to be his running-mate in the 2008 elections. Mr. Salazar is presently the President of the Fundación Biblioteca Rafael Hernández Colón in Ponce, Puerto Rico. Given his extensive background in public policy, Mr. Salazar consults regularly with clients over the phone and in person.

He died on November 11, 2023, after a battle with cancer. He was 81 years old.

== Sources ==
- (Spanish)
