= Carlos Fernando Chardón =

Former Secretary of State of Puerto Rico

- Major General Carlos Fernando Chardón

Secretary of State of Puerto Rico
- In office 1969–1973
- Governor: Luis A. Ferré
- Preceded by: Guillermo Irizarry
- Succeeded by: Victor M. Pons

Adjutant General of Puerto Rico
- In office 1973–1975
- Governor: Rafael Hernández Colón
- Preceded by: Alberto A. Picó
- Succeeded by: Salvador M. Padilla Escabi

Personal details
- Born: September 5, 1907 Ponce, Puerto Rico
- Died: December 9, 1981 (aged 74) San Juan, Puerto Rico
- Education: University of Cornell (BS)

Military service
- Allegiance: United States of America
- Branch/service: United States Army; Army National Guard
- Years of service: 1945-1975
- Rank: Mayor general
- Commands: 295th Infantry Regiment; Puerto Rico Adjutant General
- Battles/wars: World War II; Korean War

Carlos Fernando Chardón Palacios, also referred to as "Fernando Chardón" (Note: Various notable members of his family were named "Carlos Chardón". He preferred to be referred to as "Fernando Chardón" to avoid confusion with the others.) (September 5, 1907 – December 9, 1981), was the Secretary of State of Puerto Rico from 1969 to 1973 and the Puerto Rico Adjutant General from 1973 to 1975.

== Early years ==
Carlos Fernando Chardón Palacios was born in Ponce, Puerto Rico, to Carlos Felix Chardón and Isabel Palacios Pelletier. His great-grandfather, Juan Bautista Chardón, a Catholic native of Champagne, France, immigrated to Puerto Rico from Louisiana in 1816, encouraged by the Royal Decree of Graces issued by the Spanish Crown.

Chardón received his primary and secondary education in his hometown. After graduating from high school, he enrolled and attended the University of Cornell In 1928, he earned a Bachelor of Science in Agricultural Engineering.

== Military and political career ==
After he graduated from Cornell, Chardón returned to Puerto Rico and joined the Puerto Rico National Guard. He was assigned to the 295th Infantry and commissioned a first lieutenant. He served in the regular United States Army during World War II and in 1945, he completed his service in the active duty Army.

In 1946, he returned to Puerto Rico and continued to serve in the National Guard. Chardón was promoted to the rank of colonel and was named Commander of the 295th Infantry Regiment. Although the unit as such did not participate in the Korean War, most of its members saw action in the conflict, either as replacements for Puerto Rico's 65th Regiment casualties, or to cover vacancies in that unit resulting from the rotation system.

On July 20, 1965, he served temporarily as Adjutant General of Puerto Rico upon the death of Major General Juan César Cordero Dávila. in 1968, he was promoted to the rank of brigadier general in the Puerto Rican National Guard.

Chardón served as Secretary of State of Puerto Rico from 1969 to 1973, representing the New Progressive Party of Puerto Rico under the governorship of Luis Alberto Ferré Aguayo As Secretary of State of Puerto Rico he led all efforts to promote the cultural, political, and economic relations between Puerto Rico and foreign countries, and other jurisdictions of the United States. Part of his responsibilities included that he be the acting governor in the event that the Governor of Puerto Rico is unable to perform his duties. He is tied with the 22nd Secretary of State, Kenneth McClintock, as the third longest-serving Secretary of State.

In 1973, Chardón was promoted to the rank of major general in the National Guard and resigned his position of Secretary of State of Puerto Rico. Chardón served as the Puerto Rico Adjutant General from 1973 to 1975 under the governorship of Rafael Hernández Colón who represented the political beliefs of the Popular Democratic Party As Adjutant General, he was the Senior Military Advisor to the Governor of Puerto Rico and oversaw both State and Federal Missions of the Puerto Rico National Guard. During the command of BG Carlos Chardón proposed the naming of the National Guard training facility in Salinas, Puerto Rico as Camp Santiago. Chardón retired from the Puerto Rico National Guard in 1975 as the Puerto Rico Adjutant General.

In 2019, Carlos Fernando Chardón was posthumously inducted to the Puerto Rico Veterans Hall of Fame.

== Family ==
He was married to Carmín Cuyar Gatell and was the father of four offspring. His brother was Carlos E. Chardón, the first Puerto Rican mycologist, a high-ranking official in government on agriculture during the 1920s, the first Puerto Rican appointed as Chancellor of the University of Puerto Rico (1931–1935), and the head of the Puerto Rican Reconstruction Administration in the mid-to late 1930s during the Great Depression. His nephew is Carlos A. Chardón Lopez, who served as Puerto Rico's Secretary of Education in 1977 and 2009.

== Death ==
On December 9, 1981, Chardón died of a cerebral hemorrhage at the Ashford Memorial Hospital in San Juan, Puerto Rico He was buried with full military honors in Plot: Section HSA, Plot 6, at the Puerto Rico National Cemetery in Bayamón, Puerto Rico. His widow, Carmín (1911–2000), was buried in the same plot upon her death.

The Puerto Rican Government named a street after him in San Juan: Calle Carlos F. Chardón.

== Written works ==
- "Reseña histórica del origen y desarrollo de las milicias puertorriqueñas bajo el régimen español, 1511-1898"; Published 1978 by [s.n.] in San Juan, P.R.; LC Control Number 81128128

== See also ==
- List of Puerto Ricans
- List of Puerto Rican military personnel
- Puerto Rico Adjutant General
- French immigration to Puerto Rico

== Notes ==
Political offices
Preceded by Guillermo Irizarry	Secretary of State of Puerto Rico; 1969–1973	Succeeded by Victor M. Pons
Military offices
Preceded by Major General Alberto A. Picó	Adjutant General of the Puerto Rico National Guard; Under Governor Rafael Hernández Colón; 1973–1975	Succeeded by Major General Salvador M. Padilla Escabi
