= Jorge Rodriguez Beruff =

Puerto Rican historian

Dr. Jorge Rodriguez Beruff (born May 1, 1947) is a Puerto Rican historian who served as Dean of the College of General Studies of the Río Piedras campus of the University of Puerto Rico (UPR). He previously chaired the Social Sciences Department in the same college. A graduate of York University in England, where he obtained his Ph.D. in political science, and UPR, where he obtained his B.A., also in political science, Dr. Rodríguez Beruff has written and edited numerous books, the most recent of which is having edited the Spanish-language edition of Governor Rexford Guy Tugwell's book The Stricken Land, originally published in the 1950s.

Dr. Rodríguez Beruff, a professor at UPR, and a graduate of Colegio San Ignacio de Loyola in San Juan, has also been a visiting professor at the Autonomous University of Barcelona, and Rutgers University, among others.

== Selected publications ==
- The Stricken Land, by Rexford Guy Tugwell, Spanish-language translation, editor, 2010
- Strategy and Politics, Puerto Rico on the Eve of the Second World War, 2008
- Trujillo y Muñoz, una pugna caribeña, an essay published in Revista del Instituto de Cultura Puertorriqueña, 2003
- Las memorias de Leahy, editor, 2002
