= Fernando Picó =

Puerto Rican Jesuit, historian and academic

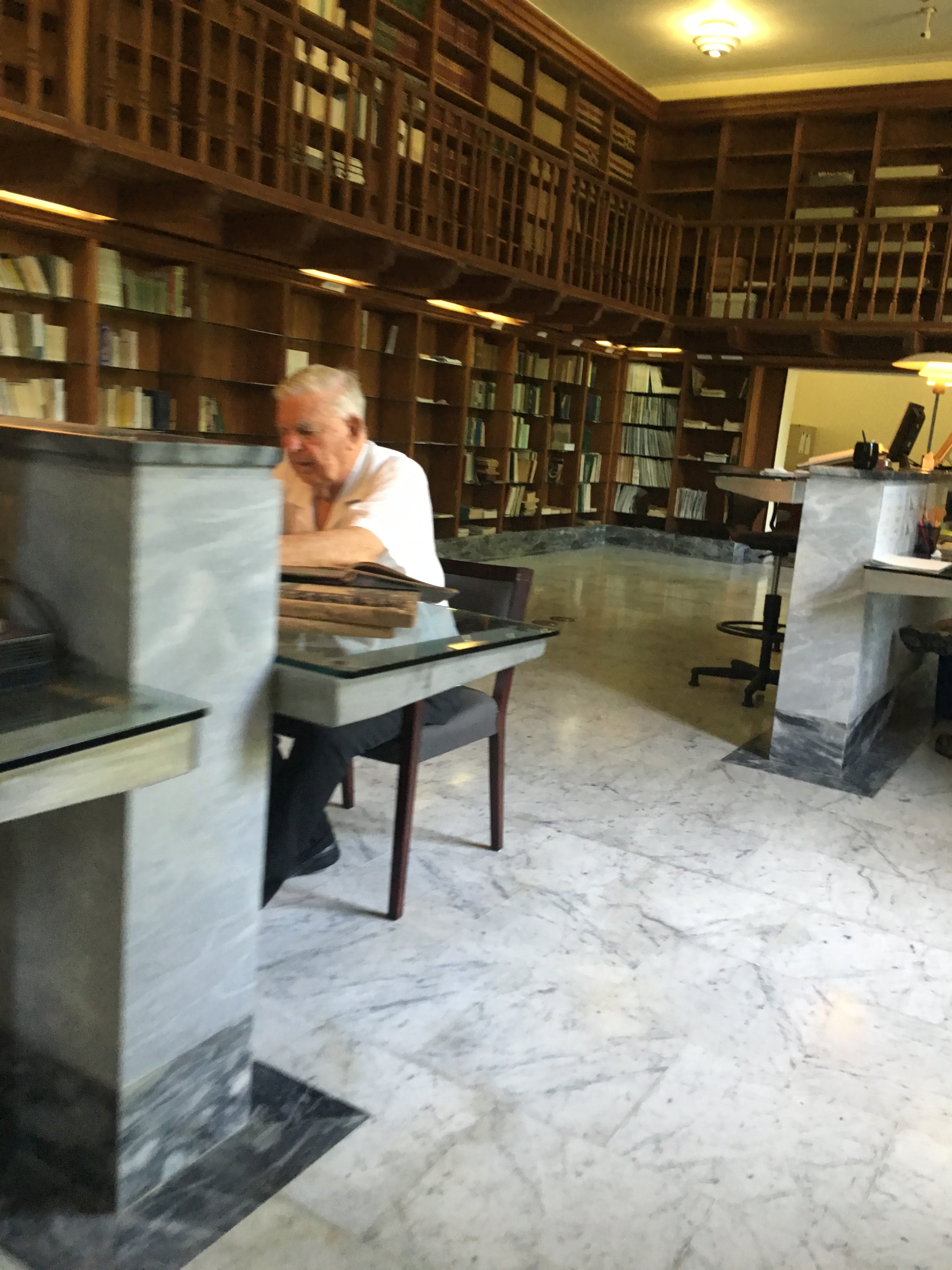
- Picó at the Archivo General de Puerto Rico
- Born: Fernando Alberto Picó Bauermeister; 15 August 1941; Santurce, San Juan, Puerto Rico
- Died: 27 June 2017 (aged 75); Cupey, San Juan, Puerto Rico
- Education: BA Springfield College (1965); MA Fordham University (1966); PhD Johns Hopkins University 1970
- Occupations: Jesuit Priest; Historian; Educator
- Employer: University of Puerto Rico at Río Piedras
- Known for: Historian of Puerto Rico and the Caribbean

Fernando Picó Bauermeister, S.J. (August 15, 1941 – June 27, 2017) was a Puerto Rican Jesuit, historian and academic. Picó was a leading expert on the history of Puerto Rico and was considered an authority on the island's 20th century history. One of his best known works, Historia General de Puerto Rico, is widely utilized in Puerto Rican history curricula. He was a professor of history at the University of Puerto Rico, Río Piedras Campus, from 1972 until his death in 2017.

== Biography ==
Picó was born in Santurce, San Juan, Puerto Rico on August 15, 1941, to Florencio Picó and Matilde Bauermeister Picó. He attended the Colegio San Ignacio de Loyola, a Catholic, Jesuit, college-preparatory school in San Juan, from 1954 to 1958. He then received his bachelor's degree from Springfield College in Massachusetts.

In 1959, he entered the Saint Andrew-on-Hudson seminary, a Jesuit seminary located in Hyde Park, New York, where he studied philosophy and theology. He received a master's degree in history from Fordham University in 1966 and obtained his doctorate in medieval history from Johns Hopkins University in 1970. His doctoral thesis was entitled The Bishops of France in the Reign of Louis IX (1226-70). Shortly after, he returned to Fordham to teach Puerto Rican history, which had been demanded by Puerto Rican students but could not be filled with an eligible application. Not knowing much of it, Picó bought volumes of the nation's history from New York bookstore La Libería. On May 22, 1971, Picó was ordained a Jesuit priest and took his final vows on September 14, 1980. Additionally, he studied in Italy and Spain.

He taught at the Department of History at the University of Puerto Rico, Río Piedras Campus from 1972 and collaborated with the Association of Caribbean Historians until his death in 2017, also being a member of the Centro de Estudios de la Realidad Puertorriqueña (CEREP). Whilst his teachings were in European and medieval history, he began studying the records of Utuado, the primary coffee producing municipality and birthplace of his grandmother. Picó was considered one of the leading authorities on Puerto Rican history. One of his best known publications, "La historia de Puerto Rico" is a required text in many curriculums on the island. His articles have been published in numerous Puerto Rican, mainland American, and international magazines and newspapers.

In 2008, Picó was awarded Eugenio María de Hostos Chair. He wrote the speech commemorating the 169th birthday of Eugenio María de Hostos, a major figure in 19th century Puerto Rican history, that year. The University of Puerto Rico honored Picó as a distinguished professor in 2010, calling him "the leading authority in the field of 19th century Island historiography, for his innovative projects, approaches, and methodologies."

In addition to his work as a Catholic priest and historian, Father Picó also authored several children's stories, including "La peinilla colorada." Picó, a humanitarian as well, worked with prison inmates.

Picó, who had heart surgery in 2015 and suffered from a stroke in 2016, became ill on June 26, 2017; the following day, he died at the Jesuit residence in Cupey, San Juan, Puerto Rico. On June 30, 2017, a public wake was organized to display his flag-draped coffin at the Tower Rotunda of the University of Puerto Rico, Rio Piedras Campus. He was survived by two sisters, Matilde Picó and Carmen Picó, and predeceased by his brother, Dr. Jose F. Picó.

== Selected works authored ==
- Libertad y servidumbre en el Puerto Rico del siglo 19 (1979)
- Amargo café (1981)
- Los gallos peleados (1983)
- "Registro General de Jornaleros: Utuado, Puerto Rico 1849-50"
- "Historia General de Puerto Rico" (1986)
- "History of Puerto Rico: A Panorama of Its People" (1986)
- 1898: la guerra después la guerra (1987)
- "Vivir en Caimito" (1989)
- "Puerto Rico, tierra adentro y mar afuera" (1991)
- "La Peineta Colorada" (The Red Comb) (1991)
- "Don Quijote en motora y otras andanzas" (1993)
- Al filo del poder: subalternos y dominantes en Puerto Rico, 1739–1910 (1993)
- "El día menos pensado: Historia de los presidiarios en Puerto Rico (1793-1993)" (1994)
- "Coffee, Society and Power in Latin America" (1995)
- "Puerto Rico 1898: The War After The War" (2003)
- "Puerto Rico Inside and Out: Changes and Continuities" (2008)
- One Frenchman, Four Revolutions: General Ferrand and the Peoples of the Caribbean (2011)
- Vocaciones caribeñas (2013)
- "Santurce y las voces de su gente" (2014)
- Puerto Rico y la sequía de 1847 (2015)
- Universitas Ludens (2019)
