= Palmira N. Ríos =

Afro-Puerto Rican academic (born 1956)

- Born: Palmira N. Ríos González; 1956 (age 69–70); Humacao, Puerto Rico
- Occupations: academic, civil and human rights activist
- Years active: 1980–present

Palmira N. Ríos (born 1956) is an Afro-Puerto Rican academic who has worked as a professor in New York, the Dominican Republic and Puerto Rico. She has served as a commissioner and president of the Puerto Rican Civil Rights Commission, the first person of color or woman to be appointed to the government body. After serving as the dean of the Graduate School of Public Administration for the University of Puerto Rico, she became the Dean of Academic Affairs for the Río Piedras Campus in 2015. The Bar Association of Puerto Rico honored Ríos with the Martin Luther King Jr.-Arturo Alfonso Schomburg Medal for her efforts to promote racial equality.

== Early life ==
Palmira N. Ríos González was born in 1956 in Humacao, Puerto Rico to a family with African roots. She graduated with a degree in sociology from the University of Puerto Rico in 1974 and went on to earn a master's degree from Fisk University the following year. Her thesis evaluated the administration of the Prime Minister of Trinidad and Tobago Eric Williams. She moved on to Yale University and became involved in the student organization, Despierta Boricua (Boricua Awakens), which actively worked to expand the rights of Latinos and people of color.

== Career ==
While working on her doctorate at Yale in the 1980s, Ríos began teaching at the Binghamton University of the State University of New York and Lehman College of the City University of New York. She was the associate director of the Center for Immigrant and Population Studies at the College of Staten Island. She published prolifically, evaluating the difficulties of effecting social change because of class, gender and race discrimination, with articles like Women under Colonialism: The Case of Puerto Rico (1985) and Puerto Rican Women in the US Labor Force (1985). Completing her PhD at Yale in 1990, with her dissertation, Women and Industrialization in Puerto Rico: Gender Division of Labor and the Demand for Female Labor in Manufacturing Sector, 1952–1980, she began working as an associate professor in the urban planning department of The New School for Social Research. Later, she worked as a professor at the Santo Domingo Institute of Technology (INTEC) in the Dominican Republic.

In the 1990s, along with other academics, Ríos founded the Puerto Rican Institute of Studies in Race and Identity (Spanish: Puertorriqueño de Estudios en Raza e Identidad (IPERI)) to promote study and conversation on racism in the country. Through the activities of the institute, she began attending conferences on racism, participating in the United Nations' 3rd World Congress on Racism, held in Durban, South Africa. In 1995, Ríos became a research associate at the Graduate School of Public Administration at the University of Puerto Rico, Río Piedras Campus. She was promoted to dean of the graduate school in 2002 and the following year was appointed to serve on the Civil Rights Commission of Puerto Rico. Her appointment was the first for a person of color and a woman to serve as commissioner on the government body which investigates civil rights violations and complaints for the Legislative Assembly of Puerto Rico, serving as president of the commission from 2003 to 2008. She continued to serve on the commission until 2013 and in 2016 was honored with the Martin Luther King Jr.-Arturo Alfonso Schomburg Medal from the Bar Association of Puerto Rico for her efforts in promoting racial equality on the island.

Ríos continued to serve as dean of the Graduate School of Public Administration until 2015, when she was made Dean of Academic Affairs of the Río Piedras Campus. She has continued to serve on various governmental advisory councils, including the Land Use Advisory Council and the Transition Committee for the incoming government of Alejandro García Padilla. She continues to work in activism to promote the civil and human rights of migrants, the LGBT community, and improve racial relationships within society.

As of 2018, Dr Ríos is the Dean of Academic Affairs of the Evangelical Seminary of Puerto Rico.
