= Secretary of Consumer Affairs of Puerto Rico =

Government of Puerto Rico

- Incumbent; Hiram Torres Montalvo since December 5, 2025
- Department of Consumer Affairs
- Nominator: Governor
- Appointer: Governor with advice and consent from the Senate
- Term length: 4 years
- Formation: Established by Law No. 5 of 1973
- Salary: $80,000 USD
- Website: www.daco.pr.gov

The secretary of consumer affairs of Puerto Rico (Spanish: Secretario de Asuntos del Consumidor de Puerto Rico) is responsible of defending and protecting consumers in Puerto Rico and leads the Department of Consumer Affairs (DACO). The position is appointed by the governor with advice and consent from the Senate. The secretary from 2013 to 2016 was Nery Adamés Soto. The current secretary is Hiram Torres Montalvo.

== List of secretaries of consumer affairs of Puerto Rico ==
- 2004: Noema Giralt Armada
- 2005–2008: Alejandro García Padilla
- 2008–2009: Víctor Suárez Meléndez
- 2009–2012: Luis G. Rivera Marín
- 2012–2013: Omar Marrero
- 2013–2016: Nery Adamés Soto
- 2017–2019: Michael Pierluisi
- 2019–2021: Carmen Salgado
- 2021–2023: Edán Rivera Rodríguez
- 2023: Hiram Torrez Montalvo
- 2023–2024: Lisoannette González Ruiz
- 2025–2025: Valerie Rodríguez Erazo
- 2025-current: Hiram Torres Montalvo
