= Carlos Rivas Quiñones =

Puerto Rican businessperson

Director Puerto Rico Office of Management and Budget
- Governor: Alejandro García Padilla
- Preceded by: Juan C. Pavía

Senior Vice President Banco Popular de Puerto Rico

Executive Director Puerto Rico Financing of Housing Authority

Principal Advent Morro Equity Partners

Management Consultant McKinsey and Company

Personal details
- Education: Stanford University Princeton University
- Occupation: banker economist

Carlos Rivas Quiñones (Note: In this Spanish name, the first or paternal surname is Rivas and the second or maternal family name is Quiñones.) is an attorney, banker and economist, and a former director of the Puerto Rico Office of Management and Budget. Rivas currently serves as Senior Vice President in the mortgage business at Banco Popular de Puerto Rico. Rivas was previously the executive director of the Puerto Rico Financing of Housing Authority, a principal at the private equity fund Advent Morro Equity Partners, and a strategic management consultant at McKinsey and Company. Rivas hold a juris doctor from Stanford University, where focused on securities, corporate and transactional law, and a graduated with a bachelor's degree in economics from Princeton University.
