= María Marcano de León =

Puerto Rican government official

María Marcano

Acting Secretary of State of Puerto Rico
- In office August 2, 2019 – December 19, 2019
- Governor: Pedro Pierluisi (De facto); Wanda Vázquez Garced
- Preceded by: Pedro Pierluisi (Acting)
- Succeeded by: Elmer Román
- In office July 16, 2019 – July 31, 2019
- Governor: Ricardo Rosselló
- Preceded by: Luis Rivera Marín
- Succeeded by: Pedro Pierluisi (Acting)

María A. Marcano de León is a Puerto Rican government official. She served as the interim Secretary of State of Puerto Rico from August 4, 2019, to December 19, 2019, following the resignation of Luis Rivera Marín. Marcano was previously the deputy director of the Puerto Rico Department of State.

Political offices
Preceded by Luis Rivera Marín	Secretary of State of Puerto Rico; 2019	Succeeded by Pedro Pierluisi; Acting
Preceded by Pedro Pierluisi; Acting	Secretary of State of Puerto Rico; 2019	Succeeded by Elmer Román
