= Juan Carlos Pavía =

Puerto Rican politician

Director Puerto Rico Office of Management and Budget
- In office 2010–2012
- Governor: Luis Fortuño
- Preceded by: María Sánchez Bras
- Succeeded by: Carlos Rivas Quiñones

Personal details
- Born: Juan Carlos Pavía
- Party: New Progressive
- Education: George Washington University (BBA)

Juan Carlos Pavía is the current director of the Office of Management and Budget of Puerto Rico. A former executive at the Government Development Bank of Puerto Rico (GDB), he began serving Governor Luis Fortuño as an economic development assistant at the Governor's Office.

During his stint at GDB, Pavía served as Executive Director of the government's fiscal stabilization board which helped stabilize the United States territory's fiscal condition after the prior administration ran up a $3.3 billion operating deficit in fiscal year 2008-09.

As Director of OMB, he is the main government spokesperson regarding fiscal controls. In 2012, Puerto Rico's economy expanded slightly after a six-year recession. In May 2012, he presided over activities commemorating the 70th anniversary of the founding of his agency during the administration of Governor Rexford Guy Tugwell.
