= Ingrid Rivera Rocafort =

Puerto Rican marketing professional

Ingrid I. Rivera Rocafort is a marketing professional and the current executive director of the Puerto Rico Tourism Company. She has worked as a market analyst, strategic planner, and Director of such firms as Procter & Gamble, Wal-Mart, and Advent-Morro Equity Partners coordinating efforts in Puerto Rico and for Spanish-speaking markets throughout the Caribbean and United States.

== Biography ==
Rivera has a bachelor's degree in business administration from the University of Puerto Rico, Río Piedras Campus with a specialty in Marketing. In 1980, she joined Procter & Gamble, eventually becoming director of external relations for the Multicultural Division. After 26 years she took retirement in 2006 and founded and acted as president of Rive Consulting Corporation, simultaneously serving on the external advisory board for Wal-Mart US until 2008. Rivera joined Advent-Morro Equity Partners as director in 2010. She headed investor relations, of the venture capital, private equity firm which involved strategic planning and analysis for venture capitalists interested in Puerto Rican start-ups or those in the US Latino market.

In 2012 Rivera was tapped by Puerto Rican governor Alejandro García Padilla to serve as the executive director of the Puerto Rico Tourism Company (PRTC). She was unanimously confirmed by the Senate following support from various industry leaders. and was unanimously confirmed by the Senate.

In addition, PRTC provides business owners with education about new regulations and laws regarding tourism and casinos.

After confirmation, Rivera had developed a plan for growing Puerto Rico's tourism sector from 6% to 8% of the gross domestic product (GDP) for the island by 2016, utilizing market analysis and evaluation of air traffic routes, among other factors. Between 2012 and 2015, the tourism industry in Puerto Rico remained stable, with varying growth across different sectors. Some sectors, like the cruise ship sector have seen increases of over 25% while others, like the convention sector and casino segment are struggling. During her tenure, the number of cruise ships stopping at the port of San Juan increased. Her marketing strategy included a partnership with the Golf Channel and legislative efforts regarding infrastructure incentives. In 2015, she received a public service recognition from the First Lady of Puerto Rico.

In addition to her business work, Rivera is also involved in non-profit service, being an active member of the New America Alliance, Since 1995, he has been part of the board of directors of the YMCA in San Juan and the P&G Alumni Network serving as a board member.
