= Puerto Rico State Agency for Emergency and Disaster Management =

Executive branch of the government of Puerto Rico that oversees its emergency activities

Bureau for Emergency Management and Disaster Administration
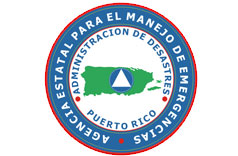

Agency overview
- Preceding agency: Puerto Rico Office of Civil Defense
- Jurisdiction: Commonwealth of Puerto Rico
- Headquarters: San Juan, Puerto Rico
- Minister responsible: Hon. Alexis Torres, Secretary of Public Safety
- Agency executive: Nino Correa Filomeno, Commissioner
- Parent department: Department of Public Safety
- Key document: 211 (PDF). 1999.
- Website: www.manejodeemergencias.pr.gov

The Bureau for Emergency Management and Disaster Administration —Spanish: Negociado para el Manejo de Emergencias y Administración de Desastres— is the agency of the executive branch of the government of Puerto Rico that oversees all emergency activities that occur in Puerto Rico. Its mission is to coordinate all the resources of the government of Puerto Rico in order to administer all the phases of emergency management (mitigation, preparation, recovery, and response) in the case of a natural or technological disaster while preventing and minimizing all damage to life and property. It also coordinates similar functions with the federal government of the United States and foreign countries, as well as offering help to and cooperating with the private sector.

Its mission according to its website is: "Coordinate all resources of the Government of Puerto Rico, and those of the private sector to provide services in the most rapid and effective way before, during and after emergency situations to ensure the protection of the life and property of citizens."

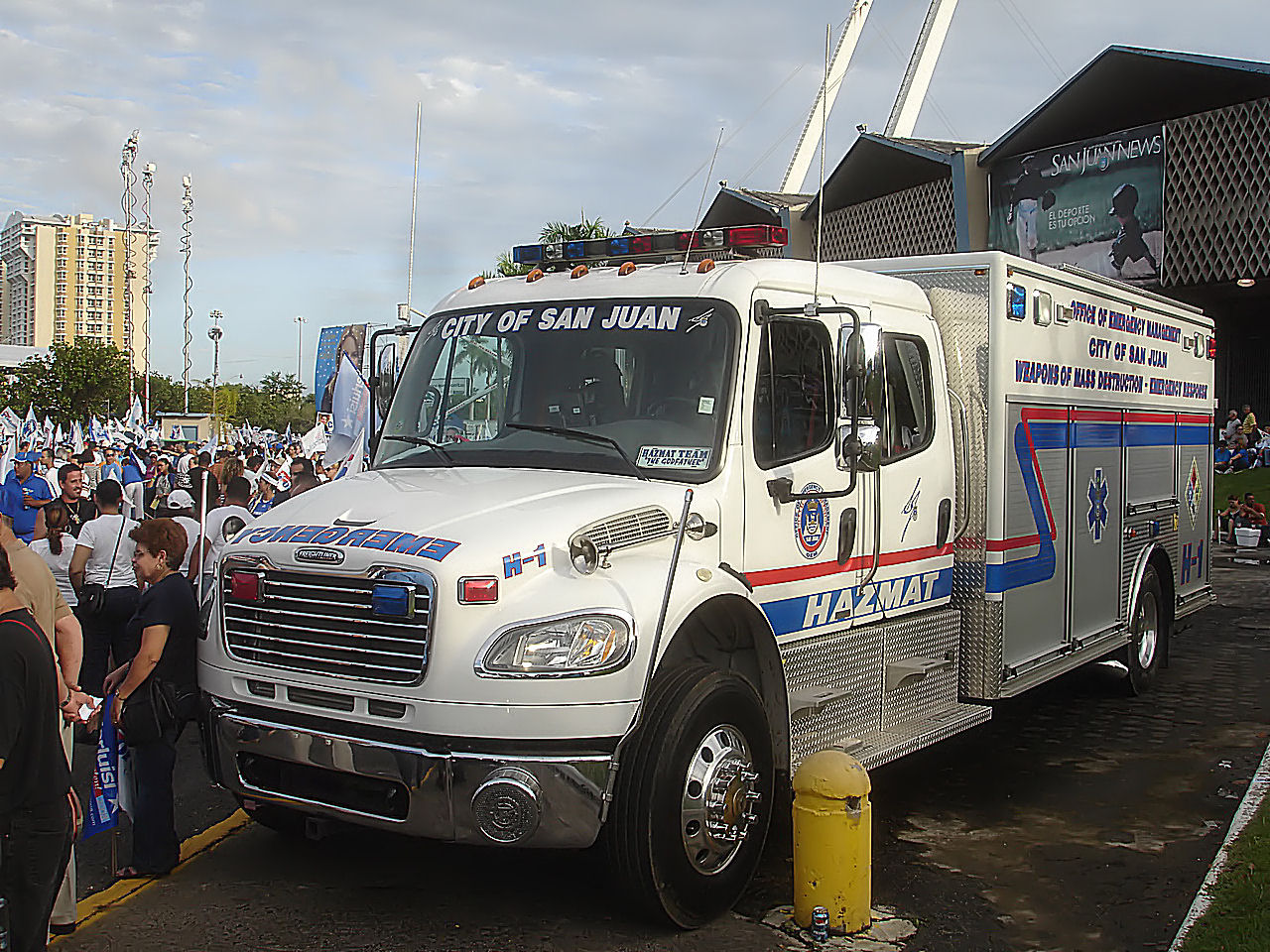
Office of Emergency Management - City of San Juan - Weapons of Mass Destruction - Emergency Response truck in 2008 in San Juan, Puerto Rico

The agency coordinates tsunami exercises with ham radio operators.

Abner Gomez was the agency's managing director when Hurricane Maria hit and knocked out power to the entire island, but resigned soon after. Former Urban Search and Rescue Coordinator Nino Correa Filomeno leads the Bureau.

The agency was previously known as the State Agency of the Civil Defense (Spanish: Agencia Estatal de la Defensa Civil) until Act number 211 derogated the Civil Defense organic law and instituted AEMEAD instead, now NEMEAD.
