= Puerto Rico Department of Health =

Government of Puerto Rico

- Departamento de Salud de Puerto Rico
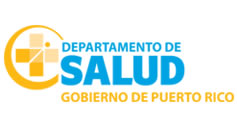

Department overview
- Formed: March 14, 1912; 114 years ago
- Jurisdiction: executive branch
- Headquarters: San Juan, PR
- Department executive: Dr. Carlos Mellado López, Secretary
- Child department: ASSMCA
- Key documents: Law No. 81 of 1912; Article IV of the Constitution of Puerto Rico
- Website: www.salud.gov.pr

The Puerto Rico Department of Health (PRDOH) (Spanish: Departamento de Salud de Puerto Rico) is one of the Cabinet-level agencies directly created by Article 4, Section 6 of the Constitution of Puerto Rico. It is headed by a Secretary of Health, appointed by the Governor of Puerto Rico and requiring the advice and consent of the Senate of Puerto Rico. The Secretary of Health is eighth in the line of gubernatorial succession.

== Regions ==
There are seven regions of Puerto Rico as defined by the Department of Health: Arecibo, Bayamón, Caguas, Fajardo, Mayagüez, Metro, and Ponce.

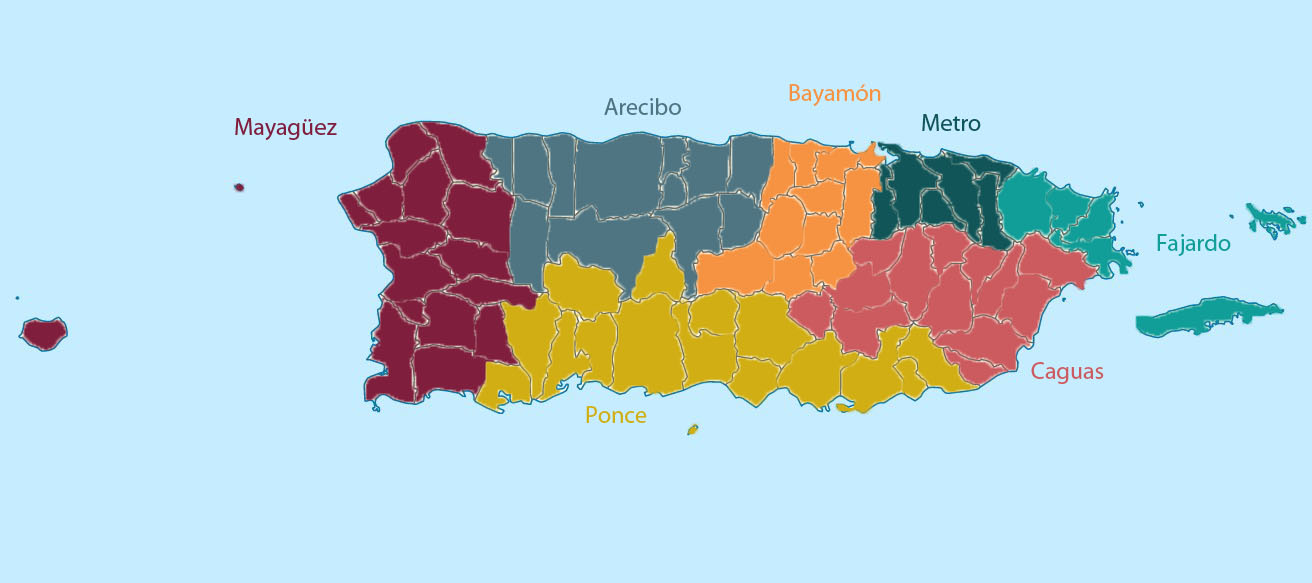
Map of PR regions defined by the PR Department of Health

== Agencies ==
style="margin: 0 auto"

Name in English	Name in Spanish	Abbreviation in Spanish
Administration of Mental Health and Anti-Addiction Services	Administración de Servicios de Salud Mental y Contra la Adicción	ASSMCA
