= Puerto Rico Tourism Company =

Government-owned corporation

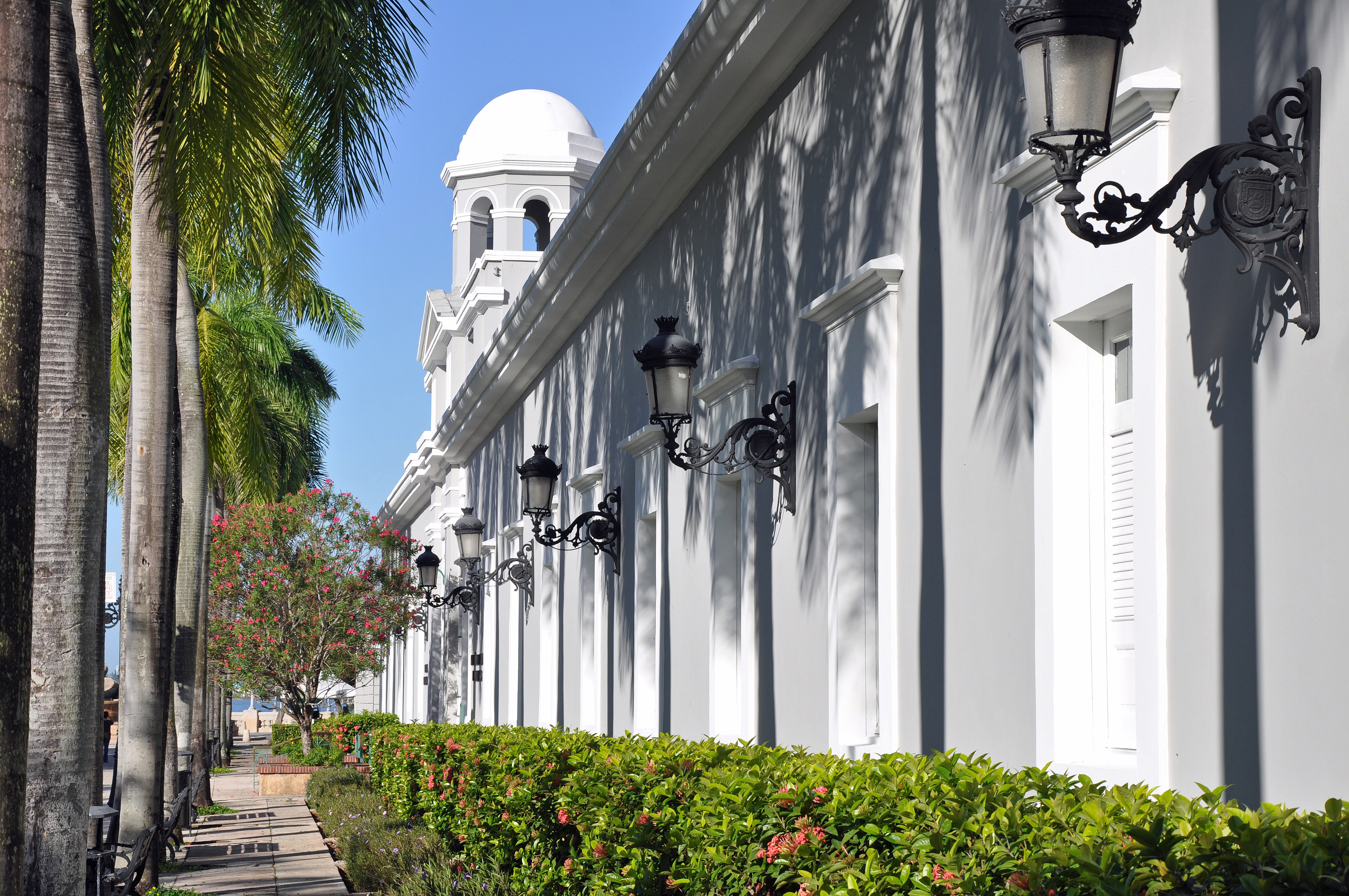

Agency overview
- Formed: September 10, 1993; 32 years ago
- Jurisdiction: executive branch
- Headquarters: San Juan, Puerto Rico
- Agency executive: Carla G. Campos Vidal, Executive director
- Parent department: Department of Economic Development and Commerce
- Key document: Act No. 78 of 1993
- Website: prtourism.com

The Puerto Rico Tourism Company (Spanish: Compañía de Turismo de Puerto Rico, or simply Turismo) is the government-owned corporation in charge of tourism matters and regulations in Puerto Rico. The company was created during Governor Luis A. Ferré's administration (1969-1973) to coordinate the marketing and growth of Puerto Rico's tourism sector. It is governed by a board of directors and an executive director appointed by the Governor of Puerto Rico with the advice and consent of the Senate of Puerto Rico.

Over the years, it has taken over several tourism-related government functions, such as the regulation and supervision of hotel casinos and of taxis. It also licenses small inns, known as paradors, under the "Paradores of Puerto Rico Program". While the Puerto Rican version features country inns usually located in rural areas, the program borrows from the state-run enterprise of paradors of Spain. There the properties are generally converted historic buildings, such as monasteries, convents, forts, etc. often located in cities.

PRTC is headquartered at the building that housed the old La Princesa jail. In addition to PRTC offices, La Princesa houses an art gallery named after former PRTC Executive Director Miguel Domenech; it features the agency's art collection as well as other exhibits. Other offices include 666 Fifth Avenue, in New York, New York.

== Executive directors ==
- Kiko Pesquera
- José "Joe" Vélez
- Frances Ríos de Moran
- 1985–1992: Miguel A. Domenech
- 1993–1996: Luis Fortuño
- Milton Segarra
- 2005–2009: Terestella González
- 2009–2010: Jaime A. López Díaz
- 2010–2012: Mario González La Fuente
- 2012–2012: Luis Rivera Marin
- 2013–2017: Ingrid Rivera Rocafort
- 2017 - 2018: Jose Izquierdo
- 2018 - 2020 Present: Carla G. Campos Vidal

== Events Hosted ==
Puerto Rico Open: The renewed sponsorship commitment from the Puerto Rico Tourism Company (PRTC) will result in Official PGA Tour being hosted in the country in 2019 and 2020. The Puerto Rico Open celebrated 10 years of PGA Tour golf in Puerto Rico in 2017 because of the sponsorship from the company.
