= Miguel Torres Díaz =

Puerto Rican engineer

Miguel A. Torres Díaz (Note: In this Spanish name, the first or paternal surname is Torres and the second or maternal family name is Díaz.) born in Fajardo, Puerto Rico is a licensed civil engineer and a former Secretary of Transportation and Public Works of Puerto Rico. Torres previously served as President of the Puerto Rico Professional College of Engineers and Land Surveyors from 2009 to 2012, and possesses a bachelor's degree in civil engineering and a master's degree in general engineering both from the Polytechnic University of Puerto Rico. He is a certified arbitrator as well, possessing a certification to exercise such profession from the Supreme Court of Puerto Rico.
