= Luis Rivera Marín =

Puerto Rican politician (born 1960)

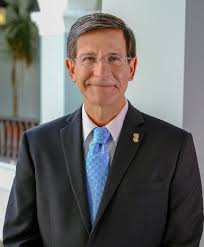

Secretary of State of Puerto Rico
- In office January 2, 2017 – July 16, 2019
- Governor: Ricardo Rosselló
- Preceded by: Víctor Suárez Meléndez
- Succeeded by: María Marcano de León (Acting)

Secretary of Consumer Affairs of Puerto Rico
- In office 2009–2012
- Governor: Luis Fortuño
- Preceded by: Víctor Suárez Meléndez
- Succeeded by: Omar J. Marrero

Personal details
- Born: September 14, 1960 (age 65) San Juan, Puerto Rico
- Party: New Progressive Party
- Other political affiliations: Republican
- Education: University of Massachusetts Amherst (BS); NYU Stern School of Business (MS); University of Puerto Rico School of Law (JD)

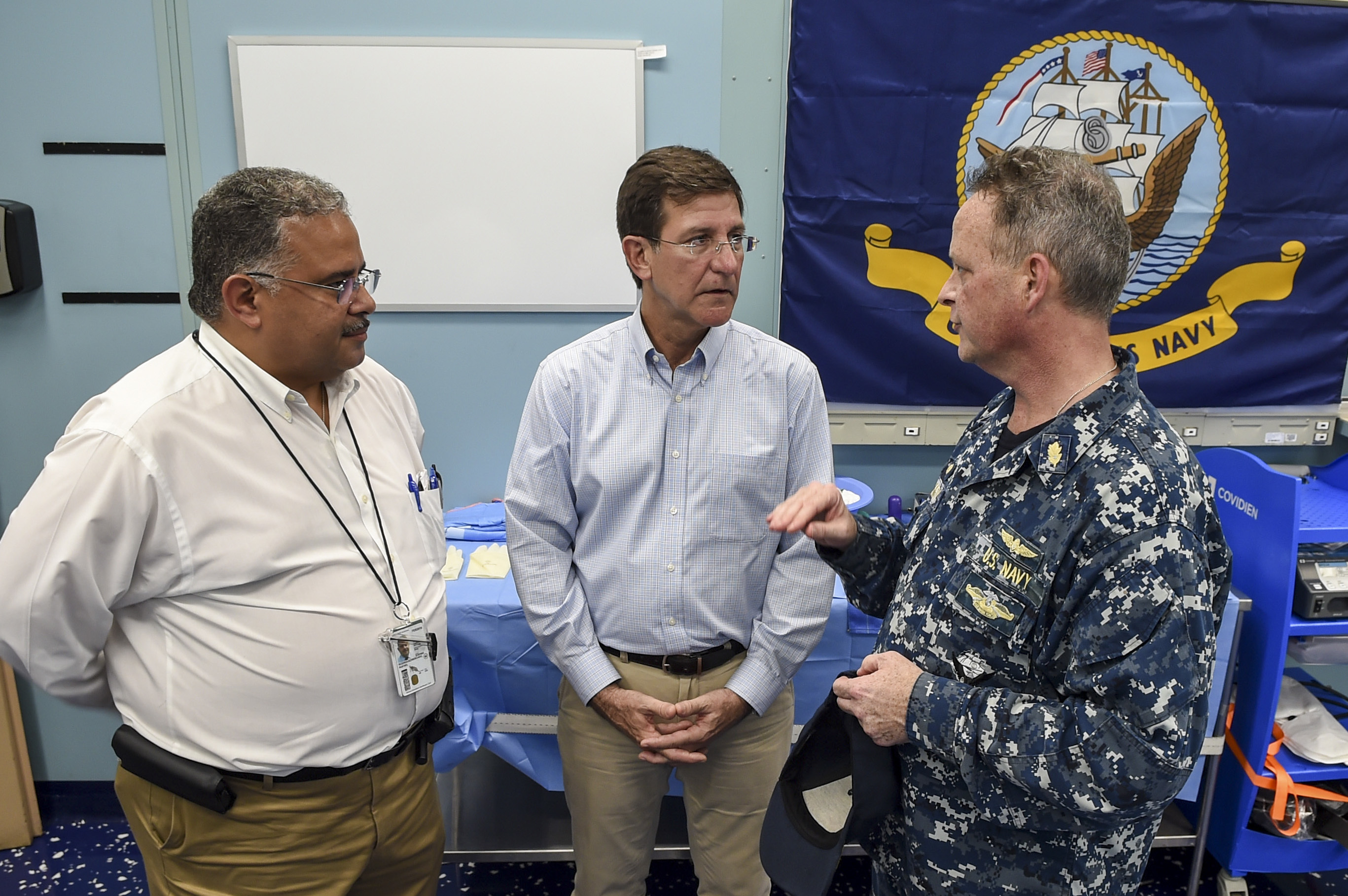

Luis Gerardo Rivera Marín (born September 14, 1960) is an attorney-at-law and notary, who served as secretary of state of Puerto Rico. Prior to this designation, Rivera Marín served as executive director of the Puerto Rico Tourism Company and as the secretary of consumer affairs of Puerto Rico. He had to resign to his position as Secretary of State due to the Telegramgate scandal, taking effect on July 31, 2019.

== Biography ==
Rivera Marín graduated from the Colegio San Ignacio de Loyola and from the Colegio Maristas. While at Maristas, he was a classmate and friend of Luis Fortuño who would later become governor of Puerto Rico.

After graduating from high school, he pursued several degrees. He first obtained a bachelor's degree in economics from the University of Massachusetts Amherst and then pursued graduate studies, obtaining a master's degree in international business from the NYU Stern School of Business and a juris doctor from the University of Puerto Rico School of Law.

Upon finishing his academic studies, Rivera Marín set up his own law firm. While at his law firm, he worked pro bono in favor of Dominicans residing in Puerto Rico, particularly with immigration issues.

But after several years of private practice he became a public servant after his high school friend, Luis Fortuño, who was by now governor of Puerto Rico, asked him to join his cabinet. He was first appointed as Secretary of Consumer Affairs of Puerto Rico In that period, he managed to ensure that American Express credit card users (who had been harmed in the company's practices, which included charging higher interest rates, and providing less debt forgiveness, among other offenses), in Puerto Rico, the US Virgin Islands and other US territories, received full remediation. During the Office review under his command, American Express provided monetary and non-monetary relief to 221,932 disadvantaged consumers, resulting in approximately $95 million, and a few years after was concurrently appointed as executive director of the Puerto Rico Tourism Company, overseeing a budget of $100 million USD.

After Fortuño was defeated in the 2012 general election, Rivera Marín returned to his private life. During that time, he also appeared as an analyst on political shows in radio and television on the island.

Then, in 2016, after Ricardo Rosselló was elected governor, Rivera Marín was appointed as Secretary of State of Puerto Rico.

On July 16, 2019, he changed his end date from July 30 to that day amidst the Telegramgate scandal involving the governor of Puerto Rico and his closest officials. His immediate successor Pedro Pierluisi was nominated by the governor before his own resignation and immediately sworn in as acting Secretary of State on July 31, 2019, and potential successor to the governorship, but ultimately was not approved by the Puerto Rican Legislature. This eventually made María Marcano de León his acting successor again and made Justice Secretary Wanda Vázquez Garced the new governor.

== Personal life ==
Rivera Marín is married to Margarita, a licensed architect, with whom he has two daughters, Carmen Margarita and Ana.

Political offices
| Preceded by Víctor Suárez Meléndez | Secretary of State of Puerto Rico; 2017–2019 | Succeeded by María Marcano de León; Acting |
