= Omar J. Marrero =

Puerto Rican government official

Omar Marrero
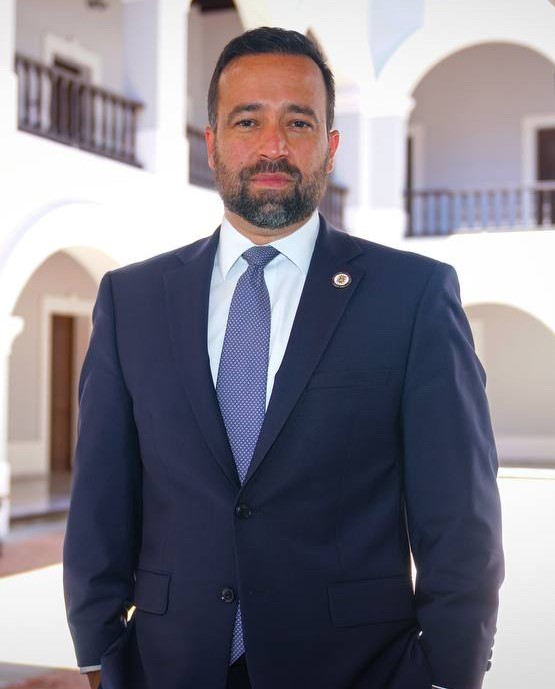

Secretary of State of Puerto Rico
- In office July 12, 2021 – January 2, 2025
- Governor: Pedro Pierluisi
- Preceded by: Félix Rivera Torres (acting)
- Succeeded by: Verónica Ferraiuoli (acting)

Secretary of Consumer Affairs of Puerto Rico
- In office 2012–2013
- Governor: Luis Fortuño
- Preceded by: Luis G. Rivera Marín
- Succeeded by: Nery Adamés Soto

Personal details
- Born: July 5, 1980 (age 46) San Juan, Puerto Rico
- Party: New Progressive
- Education: University of Dayton (BBA); Interamerican University of Puerto Rico School of Law (JD); New York University (LLM)

Military service
- Branch/service: United States Army
- Unit: United States Army Reserve

Omar J. Marrero Díaz is a Puerto Rican government official who served as the Secretary of State of Puerto Rico from 2021 to 2025, under governor Pedro Pierluisi. The role is the equivalent to the role of a lieutenant governor.

== Early life and education ==
Born on December 14, 1988, in San Juan, Puerto Rico, Marrero obtained a B.B.A. (Bachelor of Business Administration) from the University of Dayton (Ohio). After earning a Juris Doctor from the Interamerican University of Puerto Rico and passing the bar, he went on to obtain an L.L.M. (Master of Laws) in Corporate Law from New York University School of Law.

== Career ==
Marrero's public service career includes having served as Secretary of the Puerto Rico Department of Consumer Affairs. Executive Director of the Puerto Rico Ports Authority, the Convention District Authority and the Puerto Rico Public–Private Partnerships Authority, or P3 Authority.

Marrero is also the executive director of the Puerto Rico Fiscal Agency and Financial Advisory Authority (AAFAF). In July 2021, he was appointed by Pedro Pierluisi as the Secretary of State of Puerto Rico. Marrero was confirmed by the Puerto Rico Legislature in November of that same year.

Political offices
Preceded by Félix Rivera Torres; Acting	Secretary of State of Puerto Rico; 2021–2025	Succeeded by Verónica Ferraiuoli; Acting
