= Puerto Rico Office of Management and Budget =

Cabinet-level office within the Office of the Governor of Puerto Rico

Office of Management and Budget of Puerto Rico
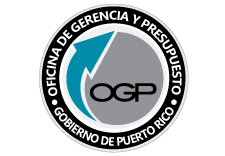

Office overview
- Formed: 1942
- Jurisdiction: executive branch
- Headquarters: San Juan, Puerto Rico
- Office executive: Orlando C. Rivera Berrios, Director
- Parent Office: Office of the Governor
- Key document: Law No. 47 of 1980
- Website: www.ogp.pr.gov

The Office of Management and Budget of Puerto Rico —Spanish: Oficina de Gerencia y Presupuesto de Puerto Rico (OGP)— is a Cabinet-level office, and the largest office within the Office of the Governor of Puerto Rico. The main job of the office is to help the governor prepare the budget. The office also measures the effectiveness of agency programs, policies, and procedures and see if they comply with the governor's policies. Its current director is Orlando C. Rivera Berrios.

OGP was created by virtue of Act 147 of 1980.

== History ==
The Office was formerly known as the "Bureau of the Budget", was created by Law 213 of May 12, 1942, during the administration of Governor Rexford Guy Tugwell, who was part of the brain trust of U.S. President Franklin D. Roosevelt, and who was appointed as the last non-native Puerto Rican governor by Roosevelt. The Bureau was part of a package of new agencies created to provide the impoverished United States territory with a state-like government. Some of the new agencies included the Puerto Rico Planning Board, the Puerto Rico Electric Power Authority and the Government Development Bank of Puerto Rico. It was created to assist the Governor in the preparation of the annual budget and the public improvements plan.

The Bureau grew during the late 1940s and its offices, within the grounds of Puerto Rico's Executive Mansion, La Fortaleza, housed fewer than 25 employees that populated three divisions, the Forecasting Division, the Statistical Norms Division and the Administrative Management Division. From 1946 to 1951, the Bureau was headed by Roberto De Jesús Toro, who served under the first native-born governor, Jesús T. Piñero, and the territory's first elected governor, Luis Muñoz Marín.

In the 1950s, under director José Ramón Noguera, who served from 1951 to 1958, the Bureau took charge of a major government reorganization. By the time Ramón García Santiago served from 1958 to 1961, the Bureau had tripled its employee headcount to 75. In 1973, the Bureau moved to its own building on Cruz Street in Old San Juan.

During the incumbency of the longest-serving Director, Lou Montañez, the name of the agency was changed to Office of Budget and Management by Law 147 of 1980. The name, as well as the emphasis of the agency's focus, was once again changed by Law 110 of 1995, when it was renamed Office of Management and Budget under executive director Jorge Aponte, who expanded the technological side of the agency and added to the director the role of becoming the government's Chief Information Officer or CIO.

In 2005, while Ileana Fas served as its director, the Office confronted the first time in Puerto Rico's history in which the new budget, approved by a New Progressive Party-dominated legislature presided by House Speaker José Aponte Hernández and Senate President Kenneth McClintock, was vetoed by Popular Democratic Party Governor Aníbal Acevedo Vilá, and triggered the constitutional mechanism of keeping the previous year's budget in place. In 2006, the Governor, in a struggle against the Legislature, ordered a partial shutdown of the government for two weeks, which also imposed new challenges on the office, which saw a succession of three directors during one four-year term. Prior to 2005, directors served, on the average, for almost five years.

== Directors ==
- 1942–1945: Louis Sturckle
- 1946–1951: Roberto De Jesús Toro
- 1951–1958: José Ramón Noguera
- 1958–1961: Ramón García Santiago
- 1961–1966: Guillermo Irizarry
- 1966–1968: Elías Rivera Cidraz
- 1968–1972: Luis Montañez
- 1973–1976: Jaime Santiago Meléndez
- 1977–1984: Luis Montañez
- 1985–1986: Orlando Sánchez Muñoz
- 1986–1989: Roberto Inclán
- 1989–1992: José Alonso
- 1993–2000: Jorge Aponte
- 2001–2004: Melba Acosta Febo
- 2005–2006: Ileana Fas
- 2006–2007: José Guillermo Dávila Matos
- 2007–2008: Armando Valdés
- 2009–2010: María Sánchez Bras
- 2010–2012: Juan C. Pavía
- 2013–2014: Carlos Rivas Quiñones
- 2014-2016: Luis F. Cruz
- 2017-2019: Jose I. Marrero Rosado
- 2019-2020 Iris E. Santos Diaz
- 2021-2024 Juan Carlos Blanco Urrutia
- 2025-To the present Orlando C. Rivera Berrios
