= List of directors of the Puerto Rico Office of Management and Budget =

The following is a list of directors of the Puerto Rico Office of Management and Budget.

PPD PNP
No.	Portrait	Name	Date took office	Date left office	Party	Governor	Affiliation
1		Louis Sturckle	1942	1945	PPD	Luis Muñoz Marín	Democrat
2		Roberto De Jesús Toro	1946	1951	PPD	Luis Muñoz Marín	Democrat
3		José Ramón Noguera	1951	1958	PPD	Luis Muñoz Marín	Democrat
4		Ramón García Santiago	1958	1961	PPD	Luis Muñoz Marín	Democrat
5		Guillermo Irizarry	1961	1966	PPD	Luis Muñoz Marín	Democrat
6		Elías Rivera Cidraz	1966	1968	PPD	Roberto Sánchez Vilella	Democrat
7		Luis Montañez	1968	1972	PNP	Luis A. Ferré	Republican
8		Jaime Santiago Meléndez	1973	1976	PPD	Rafael Hernández Colón	Democrat
9		Luis Montañez	1977	1984	PNP	Carlos Romero Barcelo	Democrat
10		Orlando Sánchez Muñoz	1985	1986	PPD	Rafael Hernandez Colon	Democrat
11		Roberto Inclán	1986	1989	PPD	Rafael Hernandez Colon	Democrat
12		José Alonso	1989	1992	PPD	Rafael Hernandez Colon	Democrat
13		Jorge Aponte	1993	2000	PNP	Pedro Rossello	Democrat
14		Melba Acosta	2001	2004	PPD	Sila Calderon	Democrat
15		Ileana Fas	2005	2006	PPD	Aníbal Acevedo Vilá	Democrat
16		José Guillermo Dávila Matos	2006	2007	PPD	Aníbal Acevedo Vilá	Democrat
17		Armando Valdés	2007	2008	PPD	Aníbal Acevedo Vilá	Democrat
18		María Sánchez Bras	2009	2010	PNP	Luis Fortuño	Republican
19		Juan C. Pavía	2010	2012	PNP	Luis Fortuño	Republican
20		Carlos Rivas	2013	2014	PPD	Alejandro Garcia Padilla	Democrat
21		Luis Cruz	2014	2016	PPD	Alejandro Garcia Padilla	Democrat
