= Puerto Rico Administration of Mental Health and Anti-Addiction Services =

Organization

The Puerto Rico Mental Health and Anti-Addiction Services Administration —Spanish: Administración de Servicios de Salud Mental y Contra la Adicción (ASSMCA)— is a Puerto Rico-based organization associated with the Substance Abuse and Mental Health Services Administration of the United States Department of Health and Human Services. As of June 2021 the administrator the agency is Carlos Rodríguez Mateo.

== History ==
ASSMCA was created by law 67 of August 7, 1993. The law made the agency responsible for helping address mental health and issues related to addiction to narcotics on the island.

In 2018 the agency lacked funds to pay staff at the Psychiatric Hospital of Río Piedras which is the main institution working with the agency to treat patients.

== Services ==
The agency carries out awareness campaigns to help prevent suicide. In 2021 the agency launched VIVE (Life) an awareness campaign

The agency has a 24-hour crisis hotline called Línea PAS. In 2020 the hotline reported an increase in calls as a result of the 2019–20 Puerto Rico earthquakes and due to COVID-19 pandemic related anxiety.
