= Puerto Rico Department of Consumer Affairs =

Government of Puerto Rico

- Departamento de Asuntos del Consumidor de Puerto Rico
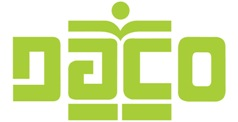

Department overview
- Formed: April 23, 1973; 53 years ago
- Jurisdiction: executive branch
- Headquarters: San Juan, PR
- Department executive: Valerie Rodríguez Erazo , Secretary
- Key document: Law No. 5 of 1973
- Website: daco.pr.gov

The Puerto Rico Department of Consumer Affairs (PRDCA) or Departamento de Asuntos del Consumidor de Puerto Rico (DACO in Spanish)— is the executive department of the government of Puerto Rico responsible of defending and protecting consumers in the U.S. Commonwealth. The department is headed by a Cabinet-level Secretary, appointed by the Governor and subject to the advice and consent of the Senate.

== History ==
The department was created by Law 5 of April 23, 1973 as a Cabinet-level successor to ASERCO, or Administration for Services to Consumers. The agency has its headquarters in the North Building of the Minillas Governmental Center/Roberto Sánchez Villela Government Center in Santurce, San Juan.

== Secretary ==
Secretaries of DACO:

- Federico Hernandez Denton - 1973–1977
- Javier Echevarría
- Alejandro García Padilla - 2005–2008
- Luis G. Rivera Marín - 2009–2012
- Omar Marrero - 2012
- Nery E. Adamés Soto - 2013–2017
- Michael Pierlusi - 2017–2019
- Carmen Salgado - 2019–2021
- Edán Rivera Rodríguez - 2021–2023
- Hiram Torrez Montalvo - 2023
- Lisoannette González Ruiz - 2023–2024
- Valerie Rodríguez Erazo - 2025–present
