= List of presidents of the Puerto Rico Government Development Bank =

The following is a list of presidents of the Puerto Rico Government Development Bank, which until 2017 was the Commonwealth's main financial and economic development agency along with the Puerto Rico Department of Treasury and the Puerto Rico Department of Economic Development and Commerce.

PPD PNP
#	Portrait	Name	Date it took office	Date it left office	Party	Governor	Affiliation
1		Rafael Buscaglia	1942	1953	PPD	Luis Muñoz Marín	Democrat
2		Guillermo Rodríguez Benítez	1953	1957	PPD	Luis Muñoz Marín	Democrat
3		Rafael Picó	1958	1964	PPD	Luis Muñoz Marín	Democrat
4		Juan Labadie	1965	1969	PPD	Roberto Sánchez Vilella; Luis A. Ferré	Democrat
5		Roger Wall	1970	1973	PNP	Luis A. Ferré, Rafael Hernández Colón	Republican
6		Juan Albors	1973	1975	PPD	Rafael Hernández Colón	Democrat
7		Guillermo Rodríguez Benítez	1975	1975	PPD	Rafael Hernández Colón	Democrat
8		Alfredo Salazar, Jr.	1975	1976	PPD	Rafael Hernández Colón	Democrat
9		Mariano Mier	1977	1978	PNP	Carlos Romero Barceló	Democrat
10		Julio Pietrantoni Blasini	1978	1985	PNP	Carlos Romero Barceló	Democrat
11		José Ramón Oyola	1985	1986	PPD	Rafael Hernández Colón	Democrat
12		José Ramón González	1986	1989	PPD	Rafael Hernández Colón	Democrat
13		Ramón Cantero Frau	1988	1991	PPD	Rafael Hernández Colón	Democrat
14		José Berrocal	1991	1992	PPD	Rafael Hernández Colón	Democrat
15		Marcos Rodríguez Ema	1993	1998	PNP	Pedro Rosselló	Democrat
16		Lourdes Rovira	1998	2000	PNP	Pedro Rosselló	Democrat
17		Juan Agosto Alicea	2001	2002	PPD	Sila M. Calderón	Democrat
18		Hector Méndez	2002	2003	PPD	Sila M. Calderón	Democrat
19		Antonio Faría Soto	2003	2004	PPD	Sila M. Calderón	Democrat
20		William Lockwood Benet	2005	2005	PPD	Aníbal Acevedo Vilá	Democrat
21		Alfredo Salazar, Jr.	2005	2007	PPD	Aníbal Acevedo Vilá	Democrat
22		Jorge Irizarry Herrans	2007	2008	PPD	Aníbal Acevedo Vilá	Democrat
23		Carlos M. García	2009	2011	PNP	Luis Fortuño	Republican
24		Juan Carlos Batlle	2011	January 2, 2013	PNP	Luis Fortuño	Republican
25		Javier Ferrer Fernandez	2013	2013	PPD	Alejandro Garcia Padilla	Democrat
26		Melba Acosta Febo	2014	2016	PPD	Alejandro Garcia Padilla	Democrat
