= Alejandro García Padilla =

Governor of Puerto Rico from 2013 to 2017

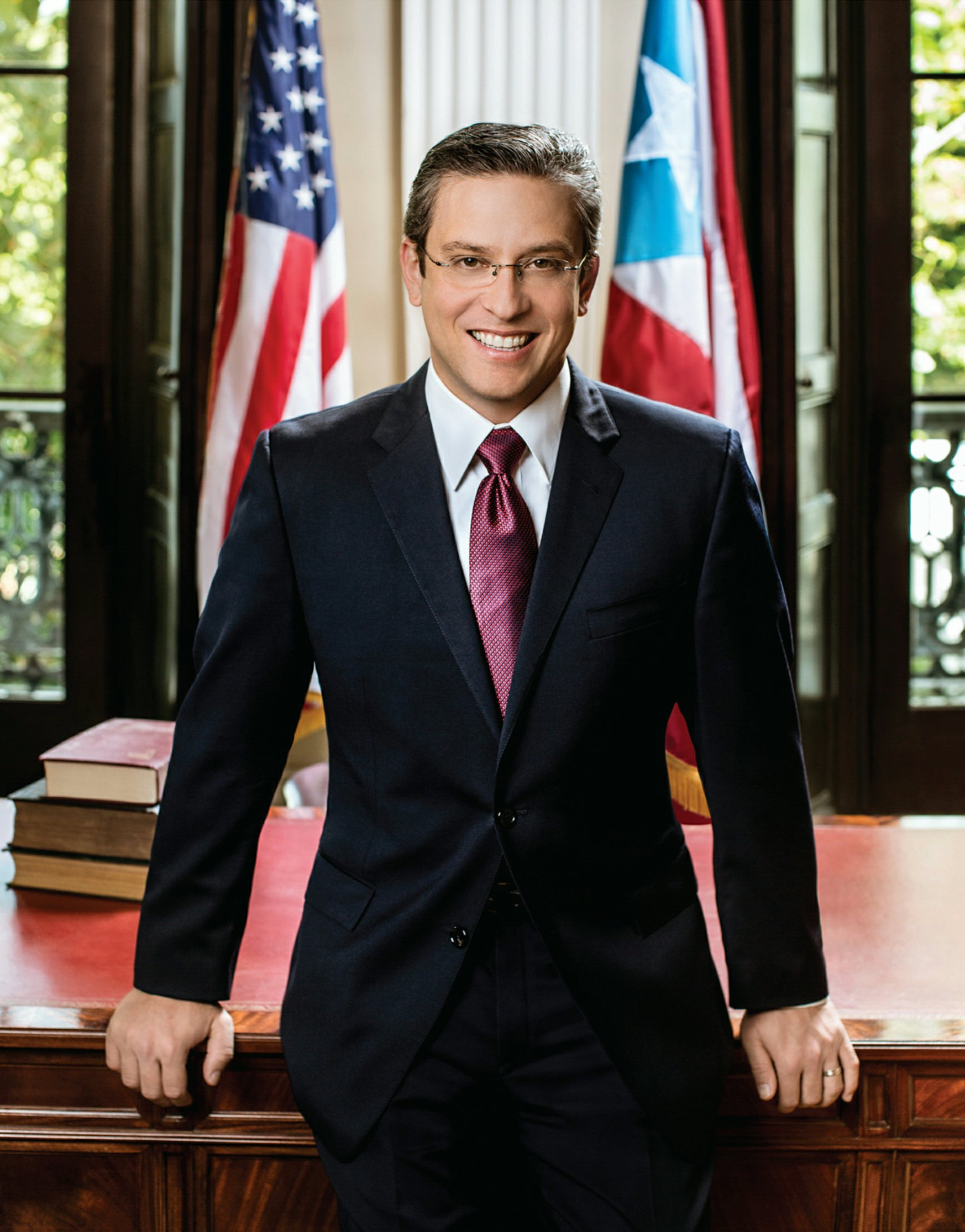
- García Padilla in 2013

Governor of Puerto Rico
- In office January 2, 2013 – January 2, 2017
- Preceded by: Luis Fortuño
- Succeeded by: Ricardo Rosselló

Member of the Puerto Rican Senate from the at-large district
- In office January 2, 2009 – January 1, 2013

Puerto Rico Secretary of Consumer Affairs
- In office January 2, 2005 – January 1, 2009
- Governor: Aníbal Acevedo Vilá
- Preceded by: [data missing]
- Succeeded by: Luis Rivera Marín

Personal details
- Born: Alejandro Javier García Padilla; August 3, 1971 (age 55) Coamo, Puerto Rico
- Party: Popular Democratic
- Other political affiliations: Democratic
- Spouse: Wilma Pastrana (m. 2001)
- Children: 3
- Education: University of Puerto Rico, Río; Piedras (BA); Interamerican University of Puerto Rico (JD)

Alejandro Javier García Padilla (Spanish: [aleˈxandɾo ɣaɾˈsi.a]; born August 3, 1971) is a Puerto Rican politician and attorney who served as the governor of Puerto Rico from 2013 to 2017. To date, he is the last Governor of Puerto Rico from the Popular Democratic Party.

Prior to this position, García Padilla held various roles in the political landscape of Puerto Rico; first as Secretary of Consumer Affairs, and then as a member of the 24th Senate of Puerto Rico and as president of the Popular Democratic Party. Locally, he is a staunch advocate for maintaining the current political status of Puerto Rico as that of an unincorporated territory of the United States with self-government, while at the national level he is allied with the Democratic Party.

As governor, García Padilla shared his legislative powers with the 25th Senate and 29th House of Representatives, both controlled by his party. Regardless of this, he was not able to persuade several members of his own party to support his proposals. This failure, in addition to his low popularity, ultimately led him to not seek re-election thus becoming the second governor in Puerto Rican history to not do so after their first term. (Note: The first governor to not seek re-election after their first term was Sila María Calderón in 2004.)

== Early years ==
García Padilla was born on August 3, 1971, in Coamo, Puerto Rico, to Luis Gerardo García Sánchez (1927–2005) and María de los Ángeles Padilla Passalacqua and is the youngest of six brothers including Juan Carlos and Antonio. His father Luis, a World War II veteran, held various jobs throughout his life to support his family, including machinery operator, and returned from the war to become a general manager of a manufacturing company. His mother has been a dedicated homemaker. He is of paternal Asturian descent with his grandfather Carlos Garcia Cadorniga born 1890 in Navia, Asturias, Spain who settled in Ponce. He also has Corsican lineage from his maternal great-great grandfather.

García Padilla was raised in Barrio Cuyón in his hometown. He attended the Colegio Valvanera High School. After graduating, he obtained his bachelor's degree in political science and economics from the University of Puerto Rico, and a juris doctor from the Interamerican University of Puerto Rico School of Law. García Padilla is the first and only governor to be entirely educated in Puerto Rico, and the first and only governor who has resided only in Puerto Rico during his entire life. (Note: Primera Hora (in Spanish) "Yo voy a ser el primer gobernador de Puerto Rico que no es de una ciudad y que hizo todos sus estudios aquí.") He is also the first and only governor born in a rural municipality.

== Professional life ==
García Padilla began his law career working at Puerto Rico's Court of Appeals as a law clerk. He then worked as an attorney, specializing in Property, Estates, Contracts, and Administrative Law. He also worked as a law professor at the Interamerican University. He later served as a legislative aide for the committees on Internal Affairs, Women's Affairs, and Agriculture, among others. He was a member of the board of the Puerto Rico Bar Association.

== Political career ==
In January 2005, García Padilla was confirmed as Secretary of the Puerto Rico Department of Consumer Affairs under the administration of Aníbal Acevedo Vilá. During his tenure at the agency, he was known for his credibility, accessibility and aggressive fiscalization. In 2007, García Padilla resigned his position as Secretary and announced that he would run for Senator.

In the 2008 general elections, he received the highest number of votes among all senatorial candidates. After the election, he was selected by José Dalmau Santiago, Senate Minority Leader, to serve as the ranking member on several committees, including Governmental Affairs, Public Safety, and Judicial Affairs.

=== Gubernatorial campaign ===
On March 6, 2011, García Padilla announced his plans to run for Governor of Puerto Rico in 2012. He also announced his candidacy for President of the Popular Democratic Party, running unopposed, and took office on April 4, 2011. On October 26, 2011, he named Rafael Cox Alomar as his running mate for Resident Commissioner (who went on to lose the election by a 1.28% margin), replacing Héctor Ferrer Ríos, who withdrew from the congressional race in order to run as the PPD's candidate for Mayor of San Juan.

=== 2012 elections ===
After the 2012 gubernatorial elections of November 6, 2012, García Padilla was elected as the next Governor of Puerto Rico, by a narrow (0.6%) margin, defeating incumbent Luis Fortuño 47.73% to 47.13%.

=== Transition ===
Puerto Rican law requires that a formal process is followed when the government must transition from one Governor to another. As such, García Padilla formed the 2012 Incoming Committee on Government Transition composed of aides and advisors who would eventually become part of his Cabinet.

== Governorship ==
=== Inauguration ===
Inauguration of Alejandro García Padilla as the 11th Governor of the Commonwealth of Puerto Rico on the Capitol steps.

García Padilla was officially inaugurated as the 11th Governor of Puerto Rico on January 2, 2013, by Federico Hernández Denton, Chief Justice of the Supreme Court of Puerto Rico, at an event held in the Puerto Rico Capitol. His term was to be concurrent with the 16th Cabinet of Puerto Rico and in parallel with the 17th Legislative Assembly of Puerto Rico, the 25th Senate of Puerto Rico, and the 29th House of Representatives of Puerto Rico. Kenneth McClintock, outgoing Secretary of State, opened the ceremony until transferring his duties and responsibilities to David Bernier, incoming Secretary of State, who served as the master of ceremonies. It was the first time in the history of Puerto Rico that a governor was actually sworn in public as former governors were sworn in private before their inaugurational ceremony; making their oath of office merely symbolic. It was also the first time in history that five former Governors of Puerto Rico were present in an inauguration. The inauguration was followed by a public concert held at the open areas of the Puerto Rico Convention Center.

=== First days ===
García Padilla formed a cabinet composed of former aides and members of the private sector to form the 16th Cabinet of Puerto Rico. He holds office in parallel with the 17th Legislative Assembly of Puerto Rico, the 25th Senate of Puerto Rico, and the 29th House of Representatives of Puerto Rico. His primary challenge will be taking a government with a large indebtness and high deficit. His first executive orders were proclaimed on January 3, 2013, one day after being sworn in. One of them activated the Puerto Rico National Guard to monitor Puerto Rico's coasts and ports in order to reduce illegal immigration and the flow of illegal goods into the island, while another established that the Puerto Rico Chief of Staff must be consulted before making any appointments to empty seats, issuing contracts or amending existing contracts. The third executive order was proclaimed to control spending in agencies with credit cards, phones, escorts, official cars, overseas travel, and cell phones and personal digital assistants.

=== Domestic policies ===
On June 30, 2013, García Padilla signed the Redistribution and Tax Charge Adjustment Act of 2013 (Ley de Redistribución y Ajuste de la Carga Contributiva (PDF) (40). 2013.) reducing the portion of the Puerto Rico Sales and Use Tax that municipalities charge from a 1.5% to 1.0%—effectively lowering the total sales tax from 7.0% to 6.5%. However, this change has not yet been reflected, and the sales tax rate of 7.0% remains. The Act also expanded the use tax to include more services, including business-to-business sales and services like consulting. Under his administration, a new tax of 4 cents per liter was imposed on gasoline.

As part of his economic policies, García Padilla launched an austerity program, raising taxes by 1.1% of the gross national product (GNP) and making public employees’ pension schemes less generous. (Note: The Economist "The governor, Alejandro García Padilla, had already launched an austerity programme, raising taxes by 1.1% of GNP and making public employees’ pension schemes less generous. That is expected to trim the deficit from $2.2 billion to $800m; it has already made 62% of Puerto Ricans disapprove of Mr García Padilla.") These measures are expected to trim the government deficit from $2.2 billion to $800 million. This, according to The Economist, made 62% of Puerto Ricans disapprove of García Padilla.

On June 28, 2014, Governor García Padilla signed into law the Puerto Rico Public Corporation Debt Enforcement and Recovery Act, which sought to allow corporations owned by the Commonwealth, such as the Puerto Rico Electric Power Authority, the Puerto Rico Aqueducts and Sewers Authority, and the Puerto Rico Highways and Transportation Authority to declare bankruptcy. However, in February 2015, U.S. District Judge Francisco Besosa found the Act was void because it was preempted by the U.S. Bankruptcy Code. In July 2015, that ruling was affirmed by the United States Court of Appeals for the First Circuit, with Judge Juan R. Torruella concurring only in the judgment. The following June, in Puerto Rico v. Franklin California Tax-Free Trust (2016), that ruling was additionally affirmed by a U.S. Supreme Court in a vote of 5–2, with Justice Sonia Sotomayor dissenting.

Facing the Puerto Rican government-debt crisis, in June 2015, Governor García Padilla announced the Commonwealth was in a "death spiral" and "the debt is not payable."

On June 30, 2016, President Barack Obama signed the PROMESA into law, which empowered him to appoint a seven-member financial oversight and management board that has ultimate control over the Commonwealth's budget.

=== Foreign policies ===
In June 2013, García Padilla traveled to Spain, where he met with representatives of the pharmaceutical and medical devices industry of Spain to showcase Puerto Rico as an attractive investment destination.

In July 2013, García Padilla's administration established a trade agreement between Colombia and Puerto Rico whereby Colombia will import medicine from Puerto Rico and provide knowledge transfer in several industries. Puerto Rico on the other hand will co-manufacture products together with Colombia, so that Colombia can benefit from Puerto Rico's lack of tariffs when exporting to the United States.

== Post-gubernatorial career ==
During the 2020 United States presidential election, García Padilla was a surrogate on behalf of Democratic nominee Joe Biden's 2020 presidential campaign.

== Public image and perception ==
On August 4, 2013, protesters marched in Old San Juan to express their discontent with new taxes imposed by his administration and the way the government has been handling its finances.

On November 6, 2013, El Nuevo Día released poll results published a year after his election that indicated that 57% of poll participants rated García-Padilla's administration with a "D" or an "F" grade and 62% disapproved of his performance as governor.

He has also been accused of nepotism, because of his having five relatives working in the government, three of them as political appointees. Most of the criticism was focused on the appointment of his cousin, Ricardo Colon Padilla, as director of the commonwealth's Medicaid program, as Colon been previously convicted of providing the FBI and IRS with false testimony during an investigation.

During a press conference in an agricultural area of Guanica, Garcia Padilla stated "Mi inglés no es de New England (Nueva Inglaterra). Yo hablo inglés con acento de Coamo" (My English is not from New England; I speak English with a Coamo accent)" and added he is proud of his rural origins, that his English reflects said origin, and said "Hablo mejor inglés que lo que habla cualquier americano el español” (I speak better English than any American speaks Spanish)."

On December 14, 2015, after weeks of speculation and due to opposition from his own party, García Padilla announced he wouldn't seek re-election. (Note: Brown (2015) "Especially damaging to Garcia Padilla’s reelection chances, he has faced strong opposition within his own party, especially from mayors who feel he did not consult them on key decisions impacting towns.")

== Personal life ==
García Padilla married Wilma Pastrana, a CPA, on April 7, 2001. They have three children: Ana, Juan Pablo, and Diego. Among his older brothers, Antonio served as president of the University of Puerto Rico and Juan Carlos serves as mayor of Coamo. Another of his brothers, Luis Gerardo, was a government employee with the Puerto Rico Telephone Company.

== Ancestry ==
Ancestors of Alejandro García Padilla

16. Luis García Avello; b. Spain
8. Eugenio García Manso; b. Spain
17. Rogelia Manso Infanzón
4. Carlos García Cadórniga; b. Navia, Asturias, Spain
18. ? Cadórniga
9. Filomena Cadórniga Camba
19. ? Camba
2. Luis Gerardo García y Sánchez
10. José Sánchez
5. Eduvigis Sánchez Colón; b. Puerto Rico
11. Rosa Colón
1. Alejandro García Padilla; b. Coamo, Puerto Rico
24. José de Jesús Padilla y Alfonso; b. Puerto Rico
12. Julio María Padilla y Iguina; b. Puerto Rico
25. María Magdalena Iguina y Lozano; b. Puerto Rico
6. Antonio Padilla Costa; b. Puerto Rico
26. Antonio Costa y Palmieri; b. Puerto Rico
13. Ángela Costa y Semidey; b. Puerto Rico
27. Ana Semidey y Semidey; b. Puerto Rico
3. María de los Ángeles Padilla y Passalacqua; b. Puerto Rico
28. Luis Passalacqua y Costa; b. Corsica, France
14. Juan Passalacqua y Palmieri; b. Puerto Rico
29. Julia Palmieri y Santiago; b. Aibonito, Puerto Rico
7. Julia Passalacqua y Rodríguez; b. Puerto Rico
30. Felipe Rodríguez y MacCarthy; b. Coamo, Puerto Rico
15. Ana María Rodríguez y Braschi; b. Coamo, Puerto Rico
31. Eufrosina Braschi y Rodríguez; b. Juana Diaz, Puerto Rico

== Notes ==
Party political offices
Preceded by Héctor Ferrer	Chair of the Puerto Rico Popular Democratic Party; 2011–2015	Succeeded by David Bernier
Preceded by Aníbal Acevedo Vilá	Popular Democratic nominee for Governor of Puerto Rico; 2012	Succeeded by David Bernier
Political offices
Preceded by Luis Fortuño	Governor of Puerto Rico; 2013–2017	Succeeded by Ricardo Rosselló
