= Government of Ricardo Rosselló Nevares =

18th Cabinet of the Puerto Rican Constitutional Government

- 18th Constitutional Government of Puerto Rico
- 2017-2019
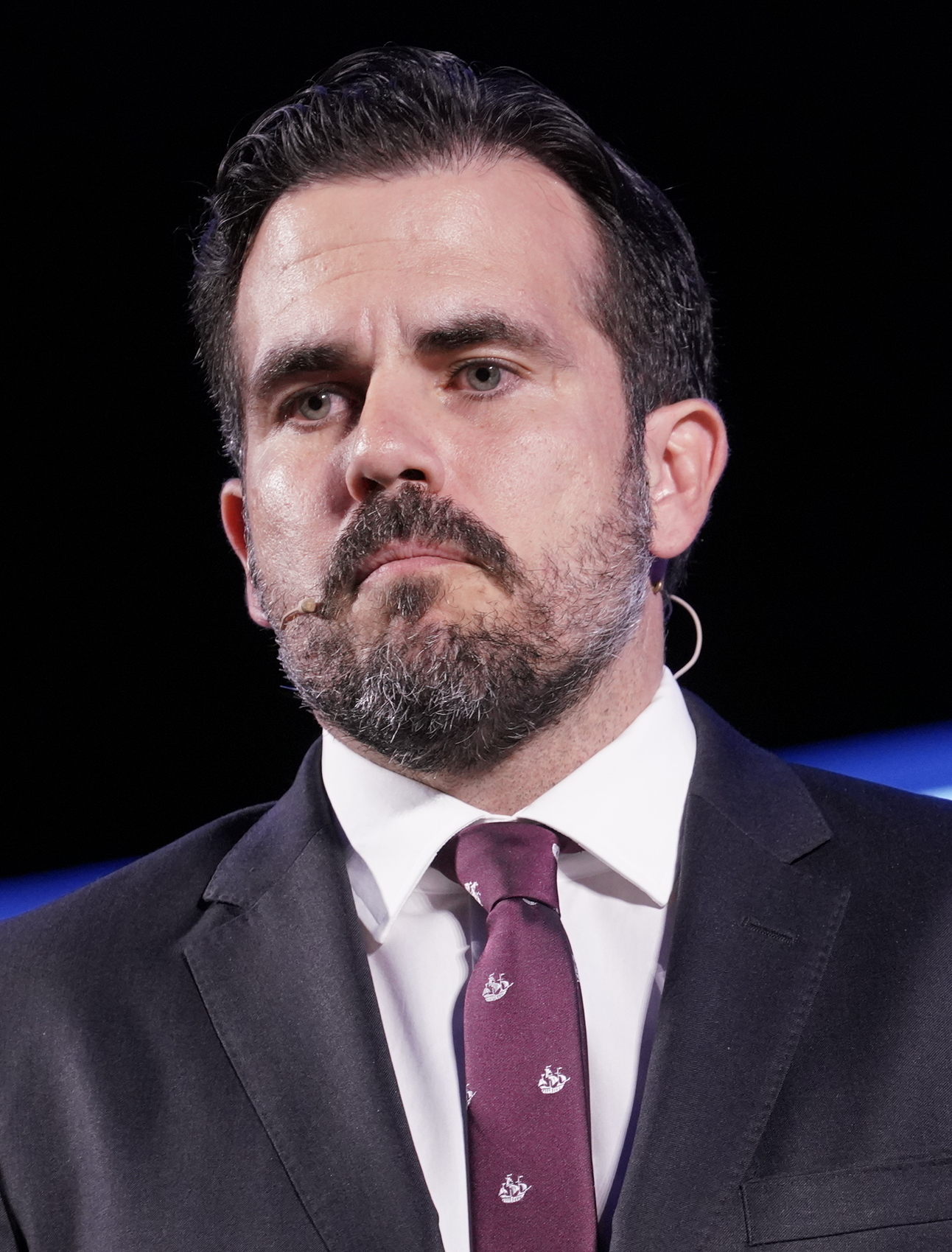
- Governor Rosselló Nevares at the World Travel & Tourism Council closing ceremony, on 4 April 2019.
- Date formed: 2 January 2017
- Date dissolved: 7 August 2019 (Note: While Rosselló Nevares resigned on 2 August 2019, he left Pierluisi Urrutia as de facto governor, having named him to the Secretary of State position. However, Pierluisi did not receive the consent of the Senate on time, and thus was only acting Secretary of State. Pierluisi swore in as governor on the 2nd of August, but his acting governorship was deemed unconstitutional on the 7th, and he was ordered to vacate the Palace of Santa Catalina that day, as Wanda Vázquez Garced was recognized as the rightful successor to governor Rosselló Nevares.)

People and organisations
- President of the United States of America: Barack H. Obama; Donald J. Trump
- Governor: Ricardo Rosselló Nevares
- Secretary of State: Luis G. Rivera Marín (2017-2019); Pedro R. Pierluisi Urrutia (2019)
- Total no. of members: 16 Secretaries (Note: Does not include the Governor or the Secretariat of Governance. Total number is 17 different positions, with one (Commissioner of Public Safety) being substituted by a new Secretary position.); 23 Cabinet Members (Note: Does not include the Governor or the Secretariat of Governance. Includes all other cabinet-level positions.)
- Member party: PNP Ind.
- Status in legislature: Majority party in both chambers Senate 21 / 30 (70%) House of Representatives 34 / 51 (67%)
- Opposition party: PPD (largest); PIP; MVC; Ind.
- Opposition leader: Héctor J. Ferrer Ríos (2017-2018); Aníbal José Torres(2018-2020)

History
- Elections: 2016 Puerto Rico gubernatorial election 2016 Puerto Rico Senate election 2016 Puerto Rico House of Representatives election
- Outgoing election: 2020 Puerto Rico gubernatorial election
- Legislature term: 18th Legislative Assembly of Puerto Rico
- Budgets: 2017 Puerto Rico Budget; 2018 Puerto Rico Budget; 2019 Puerto Rico Budget
- Advice and consent: Senate of Puerto Rico; House of Representatives of Puerto Rico (Note: The House provides advice and consent for the Secretary of State, as he is first in line in the Puerto Rico governor' order of succession as established in Article IV, Section 5 of the Constitution of Puerto Rico (1952))
- Incoming formation: 2016 Puerto Rico gubernatorial election
- Outgoing formation: Resignation of Ricardo Rosselló Nevares and several cabinet members as a result of Telegramgate.
- Predecessor: Government of Alejandro García Padilla
- Successor: Government of Wanda Vázquez Garced

The government of Ricardo Rosselló Nevares was formed in the weeks following the 2016 Puerto Rico gubernatorial election and ended prematurely on the first week of August 2019.

This government has the distinction of being the only constitutional government in Puerto Rico that ended before its four-year term expired, as Rosselló Nevares resigned on 2 August 2019 as a result of the massive protests stemming from the Telegramgate scandal. There was a period of five days between 2 August and 7 August 2019 where the designated Secretary of State Pedro R. Pierluisi Urrutia acted as governor, but the Puerto Rico Supreme Court vacated the office from after determining he was an invalid occupant and determined his actions during the period were null and void.

This led to the new government of Wanda Vázquez Garced as the 13th Constitutional Governor of Puerto Rico, along with her own cabinet.

== Party breakdown ==
Party breakdown of cabinet members, not including the governor:

- New Progressive Party
- Independents
20
3

The cabinet was composed of members of the PNP and at the highest point, three concurrent independents or technical positions (or people whose membership in a party was not clearly ascertained from any available media).

== Members of the Cabinet ==
The Puerto Rican Cabinet is led by the Governor, along with, starting in 1986., the Secretary of Governance. The Cabinet is composed of all members of the Constitutional Council of Secretaries (Article IV of the Constitution of Puerto Rico (1952)), who are the heads of the executive departments, along with other Cabinet-level officers who report directly to the Governor of Puerto Rico or to the Secretary of Governance, but who are not heads nor members of an executive office. All the Cabinet-level officers are at the same bureaucratic level as of the Secretaries

Office	Name	Party	Term
=== Governor ===
Governor of Puerto Rico; Gobernación de Puerto Rico	Ricardo Rosselló Nevares	PNP	2 January 2017 – 2 August 2019
Governor of Puerto Rico; Gobernación de Puerto Rico	Pedro R. Pierluisi Urrutia	PNP	2 August 2019 – 7 August 2019
=== Office of the Governor ===
Secretariat of Governance; Secretaría de la Gobernación	William E. Villafañe Ramos	PNP	2 January 2017 - 2 May 2018
Secretariat of Governance; Secretaría de la Gobernación	Raúl Maldonado Gautier	PNP	31 July 2018 – 29 January 2019
Secretariat of Governance; Secretaría de la Gobernación	Ricardo J. Llerandi Cruz	PNP	30 January 2019 – 2 August 2019
President of the Puerto Rico Planning Board; Presidencia de la Junta de Planificación	María del Carmen Gordillo Pérez	PNP	2 January 2017 – 2 January 2021
Executive Director for Federal Affairs; Directoría Ejecutiva de PRFAA	Carlos R. Mercader Pérez	PNP	2 January 2017 – 30 April 2019
Executive Director for Federal Affairs; Directoría Ejecutiva de PRFAA	Jennifer Storipan	PNP	1 August 2019 – 15 January 2021
=== Council of Secretaries ===
Secretary of State; Secretaría de Estado	Luis Rivera Marín	PNP	2 January 2017- 16 July 2019
Secretary of State; Secretaría de Estado	Pedro Pierluisi Urrutia	PNP	31 July 2019 - 2 August 2019
Secretary of Justice; Secretaría de Justicia	Wanda Vázquez Garced	PNP	2 January 2017 – 7 August 2020
Secretary of the Treasury; Secretaría de Hacienda	Raúl Maldonado Gautier	PNP	2 January 2017 – 31 July 2018
Secretary of the Treasury; Secretaría de Hacienda	Teresa «Teresita» Fuentes Marimón	PNP	31 July 2018 - 27 January 2019
Secretary of the Treasury; Secretaría de Hacienda	Raúl Maldonado Gautier	PNP	29 January 2019 - 24 June 2019
Secretary of the Treasury; Secretaría de Hacienda	Francisco Parés Alicea	Ind.	24 June 2019 – Present
Secretary of Education; Secretaría de Educación	Julia Beatrice Keleher	Ind.	2 January 2017 - 1 April 2019
Secretary of Education; Secretaría de Educación	Eligio Hernández Perez	Ind.	8 April 2019 – 31 December 2020
Secretary of Labor and Human Resources; Secretaría del Trabajo y Recursos Humanos	Carlos José Saavedra Gutiérrez	PNP	2 January 2017 - 8 May 2019
Secretary of Labor and Human Resources; Secretaría del Trabajo y Recursos Humanos	Briseida Torres Reyes	PNP	8 May 2019 – 9 June 2020
Secretary of Transportation and Public Works; Secretaría de Transportación y Obras Públicas	Carlos Contreras Aponte	PNP	2 January 2017 - 1 January 2021
Secretary of Economic Development and Commerce; Secretaría de Desarrollo Económico y Comercio	Manuel Laboy Rivera	PNP	2 January 2017 – 1 January 2021
Secretary of Health; Secretaría de Salud	Rafael Rodríguez Mercado	PNP	2 January 2017 – 13 March 2020
Secretary of Agriculture; Secretaría de Agricultura	Carlos Alberto Flores Ortega	PNP	2 January 2017 – 1 January 2021
Secretary of Consumer Affairs; Secretaría de Asuntos del Consumidor	Michael Pierluisi Rojo	PNP	2 January 2017 – 7 June 2019
Secretary of Consumer Affairs; Secretaría de Asuntos del Consumidor	Carmen Salgado Rodríguez	PNP	9 June 2019 – 1 January 2021
Secretary of Corrections and Rehabilitation; Secretaría de Corrección y Rehabilitación	Erik Rolón Suárez	PNP	2 January 2017 –14 September 2019
Secretary of Family Affairs; Secretaría de la Familia	Glorimar Andújar Matos	PNP	2 January 2017 – 19 January 2020
Secretary of Housing; Secretaría de Vivienda	Fernando Gil Enseñat	PNP	2 January 2017 – 19 January 2020
Secretary of Natural and Environmental Resources; Secretaría de Recursos Naturales y Ambientales	Tania Vázquez Rivera	PNP	2 January 2017 – 7 November 2019
Commissioner of Safety and Public Protection; Comisaría de Seguridad y Protección Pública	Héctor Pesquera	Ind.	9 April 2012 - 10 April 2017
Secretary of Public Safety; Secretaría de Seguridad Pública	Héctor Pesquera	Ind.	10 April 2017 - 2 April 2019
Secretary of Public Safety; Secretaría de Seguridad Pública	Elmer Román	PNP	2 April 2019-December 2019
Secretary of Sports and Recreation; Secretaría de Deportes y Recreación	Andrés Waldemar Volmar Méndez	PNP	2 January 2017 – 12 January 2018
Secretary of Sports and Recreation; Secretaría de Deportes y Recreación	Adriana Sánchez Parés	PNP	15 January 2018 – 1 January 2021
=== Other Cabinet-level officers ===
Inspector General; Inspectoría General	Ivelisse Torres Rivera	PNP	16 January 2019 – Present
President of the Puerto Rico Government Development Bank; Presidencia del Banco Gubernamental de Fomento	Christian Sobrino Vega	PNP	2 January 2017 – 13 July 2019
Executive Director of the Puerto Rico Fiscal Agency and Financial Advisory Authority; Directoría Ejecutiva de la Autoridad de Asesoría Financiera y Agencia Fiscal de Puerto Rico	Gerardo José Portela Franco	PNP	2 January 2017 – 31 July 2018
Executive Director of the Puerto Rico Fiscal Agency and Financial Advisory Authority; Directoría Ejecutiva de la Autoridad de Asesoría Financiera y Agencia Fiscal de Puerto Rico	Christian Sobrino Vega	PNP	1 August 2018 – 13 July 2019
Executive Director of the Puerto Rico Fiscal Agency and Financial Advisory Authority; Directoría Ejecutiva de la Autoridad de Asesoría Financiera y Agencia Fiscal de Puerto Rico	Omar J. Marrero Díaz	PNP	31 July 2019 – Present

== Succession controversy ==
While the Secretary of State, Luis G. Rivera Marín, would have been the successor to Rosselló Nevares, his involvement in the Telegramgate scandal forced his resignation earlier in July 2019. Rosselló Nevares attempted to name a successor in Pedro Pierluisi Urrutia by nominating him for the Secretary of State, but his confirmation was stalled in the 18th Legislative Assembly of Puerto Rico, specifically, the Senate.

The situation led to confusion as Rosselló resigned without a confirmed Secretary of State, who at the same time swore in on his own ceremony, becoming de facto governor. After less than a week, the Supreme Court of Puerto Rico decided in Senado de Puerto Rico v. Gobierno de Puerto Rico, 2019 TSPR 138 CT-2019-4 (Supreme Court of Puerto Rico 2019) that the clear successor was the Secretary of Justice of Puerto Rico, annulled any recognition or vestiges of legitimacy in the week-long Pierluisi government.

Pierluisi vacated the Palace of Santa Catalina at noon of 7 August 2019, and Wanda Vázquez Garced was sworn that day at 5pm as the 13th Constitutional Governor of Puerto Rico. Her New Progressive Party (PNP) had majorities on both chambers of the 18th Legislative Assembly of Puerto Rico and she inherited several cabinet members from the previous government.

== Notes ==
Preceded by García Padilla (2013-2017)	Government of Puerto Rico; 2017–2019	Succeeded by Vázquez Garced (2019-2021)
