= Government of Alejandro García Padilla =

17th Cabinet of the Puerto Rican Constitutional Government

Government of Ricardo Rosselló Nevares
- 17th Constitutional Government of Puerto Rico
- 2013-2017
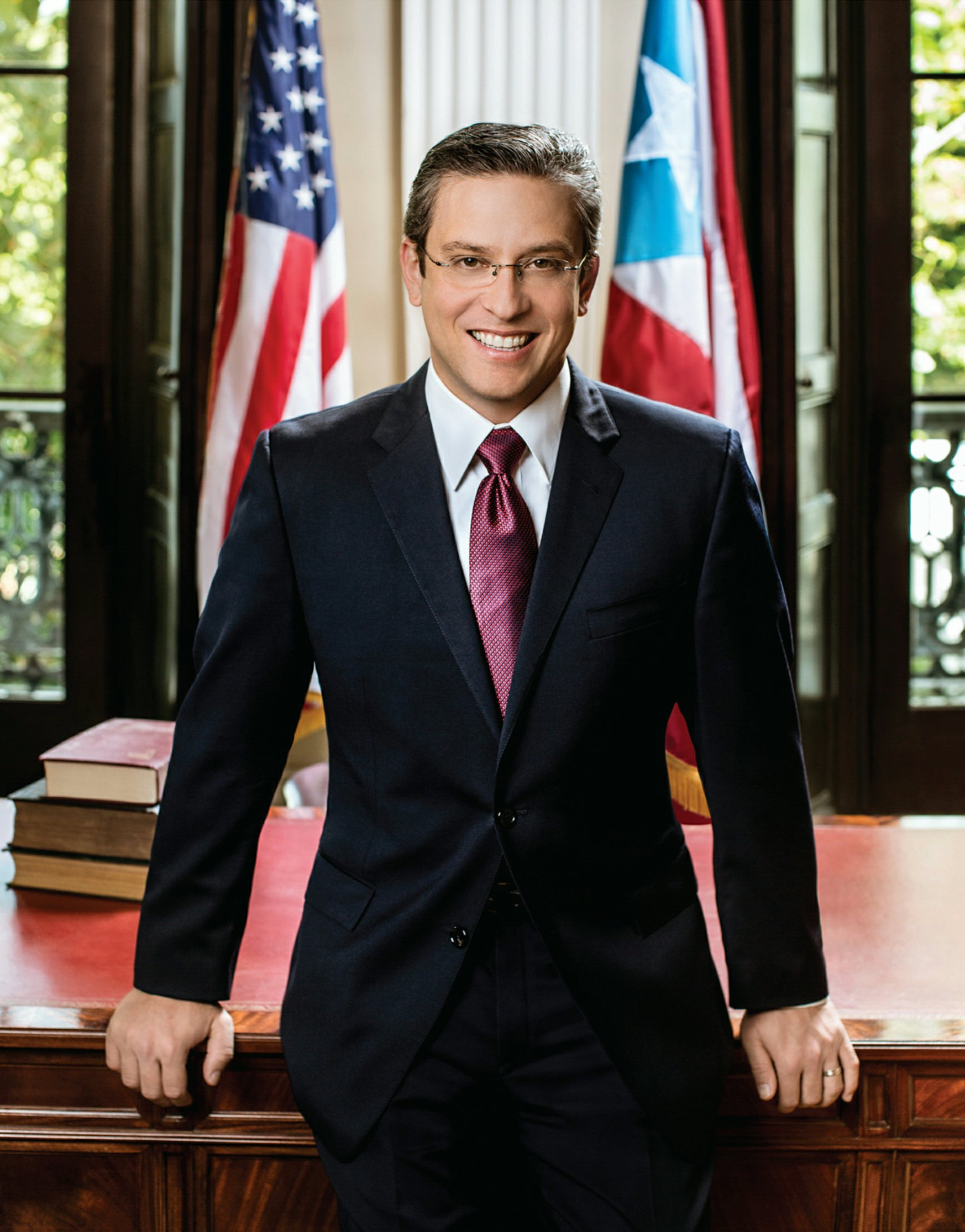
- Official portrait of Governor García Padilla (2013-2017).
- Date formed: 2 January 2013
- Date dissolved: 2 January 2017

People and organisations
- President of the United States of America: Barack H. Obama
- Governor: Alejandro García Padilla
- Secretary of State: David Bernier Rivera
- Total no. of members: 15 Secretaries (Note: Does not include the Governor or the Secretariat of Governance.); 20 Cabinet Members (Note: Does not include the Governor or the Secretariat of Governance. Includes all other cabinet-level positions.)
- Member party: PPD PIP (Note: Vance Thomas Rider was a leader of the Independence Party Youth, and a several times candidate for mayoralty for the PIP (1992 for Culebra and 2000 for San Juan), but endorsed Garcia Padilla's bid for governor, despite being from a different party. The PIP senator, María de Lourdes Santiago Negrón voted against his confirmation as Labor Secretary. Santiago Negrón implied in an interview that Thomas' relationship with the party was strained. Vance denied being a "melón", a term meaning a person who advocates publicly for independence and aligns with the PIP, but votes or incites others to vote for the pro-status quo PPD.) Ind.
- Status in legislature: Majority party in both chambers Senate 18 / 27 (67%) House of Representatives 28 / 51 (55%)
- Opposition party: PNP (largest); PIP
- Opposition leader: Pedro Pierluisi Urrutia (2013-2016); Ricky Rosselló Nevares (2016-2017)

History
- Elections: 2012 Puerto Rico gubernatorial election 2012 Puerto Rico Senate election 2012 Puerto Rico House of Representatives election
- Outgoing election: 2016 Puerto Rico gubernatorial election
- Legislature term: 17th Legislative Assembly of Puerto Rico
- Budgets: 2013 Puerto Rico Budget; 2014 Puerto Rico Budget; 2015 Puerto Rico Budget; 2016 Puerto Rico Budget
- Advice and consent: Senate of Puerto Rico; House of Representatives of Puerto Rico (Note: The House provides advice and consent for the Secretary of State, as he is first in line in the Puerto Rico governor' order of succession as established in Article IV, Section 5 of the Constitution of Puerto Rico (1952))
- Incoming formation: 2012 Puerto Rico gubernatorial election
- Outgoing formation: 2016 Puerto Rico gubernatorial election
- Predecessor: Government of Luis Fortuño Burset
- Successor: Government of Ricardo Rosselló Nevares

The government of Alejandro García Padilla was formed in the weeks following the 2012 Puerto Rico gubernatorial election and was sworn in initially in January 2013, with some confirmations coming in later. It featured a pro-Independence secretary, a non-partisan Secretary of Governance, as well as the continuation of the previous PNP administrations' Commissioner of Safety and Public Protection.

== Party breakdown ==
Party breakdown of 21 cabinet members, not including the governor, but including the Secretary of Governance, from January 2013 to September 2014:

- Popular Democratic Party
18
- Indendependence Party
1
- Independents
2

The cabinet was composed of members of the PPD, a PIP member (in defiance to PIP leadership), and at its height, two concurrent independents or technical positions (or people whose membership in a party was not clearly ascertained from any available media). After the exit of Ingrid Vila Biaggi in September 2014, the PPD gained a seat in the Cabinet at the expense of the independent position she left for Víctor Suárez Meléndez:

- Popular Democratic Party
19
- Indendependence Party
1
- Independents
1

== Members of the Cabinet ==
The Puerto Rican Cabinet is led by the Governor, along with, starting in 1986, the Secretary of Governance. The Cabinet is composed of all members of the Constitutional Council of Secretaries (Article IV of the Constitution of Puerto Rico (1952)), who are the heads of the executive departments, along with other Cabinet-level officers who report directly to the Governor of Puerto Rico or to the Secretary of Governance, but who are not heads nor members of an executive office. All the Cabinet-level officers are at the same bureaucratic level as of the Secretaries

Office	Name	Party	Term
=== Governor ===
Governor of Puerto Rico; Gobernación de Puerto Rico	Alejandro García Padilla	PPD	2 January 2013 – 2 January 2017
=== Office of the Governor ===
Secretariat of Governance; Secretaría de la Gobernación	Ingrid Vila Biaggi	Ind.	2 January 2013 - 19 September 2014
Secretariat of Governance; Secretaría de la Gobernación	Víctor Suárez Meléndez	PPD	19 September 2014 – 9 December 2015
Secretariat of Governance; Secretaría de la Gobernación	Grace Santana Balado	PPD	9 December 2015 – 1 January 2017
Director of the Office of Management and Budget; Directoría de la Oficina de Gerencia y Presupuesto	Carlos Rivas Quiñones	PPD	15 October 2014 – 2 January 2017
Director of the Office of Management and Budget; Directoría de la Oficina de Gerencia y Presupuesto	Luis F. Cruz Batista	PPD	2 January 2013 – 2 January 2014
President of the Puerto Rico Planning Board; Presidencia de la Junta de Planificación	Luis García Pelatti	PPD	2 January 2013 – 2 January 2017
President of the Environmental Quality Board; Presidencia de la Junta de Calidad Ambiental	Laura Vélez Vélez	PPD	2 January 2013 – 1 September 2015
Executive Director for Federal Affairs Administration; Directoría Ejecutiva de la Administración de Asuntos Federales	Juan Eugenio Hernández Mayoral	PPD	2 January 2013 – 2 January 2017
=== Council of Secretaries ===
Secretary of State; Secretaría de Estado	David Bernier Rivera	PPD	2 January 2013- 30 October 2015
Secretary of State; Secretaría de Estado	Víctor Suárez Meléndez	PPD	1 November 2015 - 2 January 2017
Secretary of Justice; Secretaría de Justicia	Luis Sánchez Betances	PPD	2 January 2013 – 31 December 2013
Secretary of Justice; Secretaría de Justicia	César R. Miranda Rodríguez	PPD	13 January 2014 - 2 January 2017
Secretary of the Treasury; Secretaría de Hacienda	Melba Acosta Febo	PPD	2 January 2013 – 26 October 2014
Secretary of the Treasury; Secretaría de Hacienda	Juan C. Zaragoza Gómez	PPD	26 October 2014 - 2 January 2017
Secretary of Education; Secretaría de Educación	Rafael Román Meléndez	PPD	2 January 2013 - 2 January 2017
Secretary of Labor and Human Resources; Secretaría del Trabajo y Recursos Humanos	Vance E. Thomas Rider	PIP	2 January 2013 - 2 January 2017
Secretary of Transportation and Public Works; Secretaría de Transportación y Obras Públicas	Miguel Torres Díaz	PPD	2 January 2013 - 2 January 2017
Secretary of Economic Development and Commerce; Secretaría de Desarrollo Económico y Comercio	Alberto Bacó Bagué	PPD	2 January 2013 - 2 January 2017
Secretary of Health; Secretaría de Salud	Francisco Joglar Pesquera	PPD	2 January 2013 - 13 September 2013
Secretary of Health; Secretaría de Salud	Ana Ríus Armendáriz	PPD	16 September 2013 - 2 January 2017
Secretary of Agriculture; Secretaría de Agricultura	Myrna Comas Pagán	PPD	2 January 2013 - 2 January 2017
Secretary of Consumer Affairs; Secretaría de Asuntos del Consumidor	Nery Adamés Soto	PPD	2 January 2013 - 2 January 2017
Secretary of Corrections and Rehabilitation; Secretaría de Corrección y Rehabilitación	José Negrón Fernández	PPD	2 January 2013 - 2 January 2017
Secretary of Family Affairs; Secretaría de la Familia	Idalia Colón Rondón	PPD	2 January 2013 - 2 January 2017
Secretary of Housing; Secretaría de Vivienda	Rubén Ríos Pagán	PPD	2 January 2013 - 2 January 2017
Secretary of Natural and Environmental Resources; Secretaría de Recursos Naturales y Ambientales	Carmen Guerrero Pérez	PPD	2 January 2013 - 2 January 2017
Secretary of Sports and Recreation; Secretaría de Deportes y Recreación	Ramón Orta Rodríguez	PPD	2 January 2013 - 2 January 2017
=== Other Cabinet-level officers ===
Commissioner of Safety and Public Protection; Comisaría de Seguridad y Protección Pública	Héctor Pesquera	Ind.	9 April 2012 - 10 April 2017
President of the Puerto Rico Government Development Bank; Presidencia del Banco Gubernamental de Fomento	Javier D. Ferrer Fernández	PPD	2 January 2013 – 13 July 2014
President of the Puerto Rico Government Development Bank; Presidencia del Banco Gubernamental de Fomento	Melba Acosta Febo	PPD	27 October 2014 - 31 July 2016
President of the Puerto Rico Government Development Bank; Presidencia del Banco Gubernamental de Fomento	Alberto Bacó Bagué	PPD	31 July 2016 – 2 January 2017

== Notes ==
Preceded by Fortuño Burset (2009-2013)	Government of Puerto Rico; 2013–2017	Succeeded by Rosselló Nevares (2017-2019)
