= List of Puerto Rico Cabinet-level officers =

The Cabinet-level officers of the executive branch of the government of Puerto Rico are the heads of the executive agencies that report directly to the Governor of Puerto Rico or to the Chief of Staff who also happen to not be Secretaries of an executive department nor members of an executive office—except for the Directors of the Office of Management and Budget and the Planning Board who are considered Cabinet-level officers. All the Cabinet-level officers are at the same bureaucratic level as of the Secretaries and together with the Council of Secretaries compose the Cabinet of Puerto Rico.

== Officers ==
Post	Agency	Current officer (2025)
Chief of Staff	Secretariat of Governance	Francisco Domenech
Director of the Puerto Rico Office of Management and Budget	Office of Management and Budget	Orlando Rivera Berrios
Director of the Puerto Rico Federal Affairs Administration	Federal Affairs Administration	Gabriella Boffelli
Inspector General of Puerto Rico	Office of the Inspector General of the Government of Puerto Rico	Ivelisse Torres Rivera
President of the Puerto Rico Planning Board	Planning Board	Héctor Morales Martínez
President of the Puerto Rico Government Development Bank (Note: The President of the Puerto Rico Government Development Bank (GDB) is considered a Cabinet-level officer since the GDB serves as the government's fiscal agent and financial advisor even though the GDB is a government-owned corporation.)	Government Development Bank	dissolved in 2017
Commissioner of Safety and Public Protection	Commission on Safety and Public Protection	dissolved in 2017
