= Puerto Rico Council of Secretaries =

Council of Secretaries of Puerto Rico
Council overview
- Formed: July 25, 1952; 72 years ago
- Council executive: Zoé Laboy, Chief of Staff
- Key documents: Article IV of the Constitution of Puerto Rico, some reorganization plans, and; several acts which created other executive departments not established by the Constitution

The Council of Secretaries of Puerto Rico (Spanish: Consejo de Secretarios) is the group composed by the heads of the executive departments of the government of Puerto Rico. The Council is charged with leading the different sectors of public administration within the government and does not constitute an agency by itself.

The Council, together with the Cabinet-level officers, compose the Cabinet of Puerto Rico.

== Background ==
The establishment of the Council is proclaimed by Article IV of the Constitution of Puerto Rico which establishes that the Governor shall be assisted by Secretaries whom shall collectively constitute the Governor's advisory council and be designated as the Council of Secretaries.

Each Secretary is nominated by the Governor and then presented to the Senate for advice and consent by a simple majority—except for the Secretary of State who requires the advice and consent of both the Senate and the House of Representatives. If the Secretaries are confirmed they are sworn in and begin their duties immediately afterwards. However, Secretaries appointed during a legislative recess may begin serving immediately under a recess appointment until the end of the following regular session of the Legislative Assembly, or rejected by the Senate, whichever occurs first, should they not be confirmed.

The Constitution of Puerto Rico established eight Secretaries, namely: the Secretary of Agriculture and Commerce, Education, Health, Justice, Labor, Public Works, State, and Treasury.

The Secretary of Agriculture and Commerce evolved into two different posts: the Secretary of Agriculture and the Secretary of Economic Development and Commerce, while the Secretary of Labor evolved into the Secretary of Labor and Human Resources, and the Secretary of Public Works into the Secretary of Transportation and Public Works.

The creation of more executive departments by Puerto Rican law established more Secretaries, namely: the Secretary of Consumer Affairs, Corrections and Rehabilitation, Family Affairs, Housing, Natural and Environmental Resources, and Sports and Recreation.

== Current posts ==
Post	Department	Current officer	Order of succession
Secretary of Agriculture	Department of Agriculture	Carlos Flores	N/A
Secretary of Consumer Affairs	Department of Consumer Affairs	Michael Pierluisi	N/A
Secretary of Corrections and Rehabilitation	Department of Corrections and Rehabilitation	Erik Rolon	N/A
Secretary of Economic Development and Commerce	Department of Economic Development and Commerce	Manuel Laboy	7
Secretary of Education	Department of Education	Eligio Hernández Pérez	4
Secretary of Family Affairs	Department of Family Affairs	Glorimar Andujar	N/A
Secretary of Health	Department of Health	Rafael Rodríguez Mercado	8
Secretary of Housing	Department of Housing	Fernando Gil	N/A
Secretary of Justice	Department of Justice	Wanda Vazquez	2
Secretary of Labor and Human Resources	Department of Labor and Human Resources	Carlos Saavedra Gutierrez	5
Secretary of Natural and Environmental Resources	Department of Natural and Environmental Resources	Tania Vazquez	N/A
Secretary of Public Safety	Department of Public Safety	Elmer Román	N/A
Secretary of Sports and Recreation	Department of Sports and Recreation	Andres Volmar	N/A
Secretary of State	Department of State	Luis Rivera Marín	1
Secretary of Transportation and Public Works	Department of Transportation and Public Works	Carlos Contreras	6
Secretary of Treasury	Department of Treasury	Teresita Fuentes	3
