= Executive branch of the government of Puerto Rico =

Chief executive body of Puerto Rico

The executive branch of the government of Puerto Rico is responsible for executing the laws of Puerto Rico, as well as causing them to be executed. Article IV of the Constitution of Puerto Rico vests the executive power on the governor—who by its nature forms the executive branch.

The Constitution also establishes that the secretary of state should serve as acting governor when the governor is unable to perform his duties. The secretary of state, therefore, performs an equivalent role to that of a lieutenant governor in United States politics.

The Puerto Rico Chief of Staff is second-in-command and manages and oversees all executive departments and almost all executive agencies.

Article IV also establishes that the governor shall be assisted by Secretaries whom shall collectively constitute the governor's advisory council and be designated as the Council of Secretaries. The council, together with the Cabinet-level officers, compose the Cabinet of Puerto Rico.

The Constitution created eight executive departments. Later on, the Legislative Assembly reorganized one of these, and created and reorganized a few more. Today, the executive branch is composed of fifteen executive departments each headed by a Secretary.

== Executive posts ==
=== Governor ===
Article IV of the Constitution of Puerto Rico vests the executive power on the Governor. The Governor has a duty to enforce state laws, to convene the Legislative Assembly, the power to either approve or veto bills passed by the Legislative Assembly, to appoint government officers, to appoint Justices, and to grant pardons.

=== Lieutenant governor ===
Puerto Rico does not have a post for lieutenant governor but the Secretary of State performs an equivalent role. Article IV of the Constitution of Puerto Rico establishes that the Secretary of State should serve as acting governor when the Governor is unable to perform his duties. The Constitution and Puerto Rican law establishes a governmental line of succession for special cases when neither the Governor nor the Secretary are available.

=== Chief of Staff ===
Neither the Constitution of Puerto Rico nor Puerto Rican law provide for a Chief of Staff position. However, Governors proclaim an executive order establishing the post for the Puerto Rico Chief of Staff who is charged with managing and overseeing all executive departments and almost all executive agencies.

== Executive offices ==
The executive branch is led by the Office of the Governor of Puerto Rico which consists of the immediate staff to the Governor as well as multiple levels of support. All other executive offices are ascribed to the Office of the Governor. The Governor, however, delegates the management and overwatch of almost all the executive offices to the Secretariat of Governance and the Chief of Staff; being the Office of Management and Budget and the Planning Board the only executive offices that report directly to the Governor. The executive offices are comprised by:

- Environmental Quality Board
- Office of Management and Budget
- Office of the Governor of Puerto Rico
- Planning Board
- Secretariat of Governance

== Secretaries ==
Article IV of the Constitution of Puerto Rico establishes that the Governor shall be assisted by Secretaries whom shall collectively constitute the Governor's advisory council and be designated as the Council of Secretaries. These Secretaries and other officers which hold positions at the same bureaucratic level compose the Cabinet. On rare occasions, the Cabinet is called upon to ratify a gubernatorial decision, such as the appointment of a member of the board of the Puerto Rico Government Development Bank, in lieu of the Senate's advice and consent.

All Cabinet members are nominated by the Governor and then presented to the Senate for advice and consent by a simple majority—except for the Secretary of State who requires the advice and consent of both the Senate and the House of Representatives. If the Cabinet members are confirmed they are sworn in and begin their duties immediately afterwards. However, Cabinet members appointed during a legislative recess may begin serving immediately under a recess appointment until the end of the following regular session of the Legislative Assembly, or rejected by the Senate, whichever occurs first, should they not be confirmed. All members leading executive departments receive the title of Secretary (Spanish: Secretario (m)/Secretaria (f)).

The Council of Secretaries is the group composed by the heads of the executive departments of the government of Puerto Rico. The council is charged with leading the different sectors of public administration within the government and is comprised by:

- Secretary of Agriculture
- Secretary of Consumer Affairs
- Secretary of Corrections and Rehabilitation
- Secretary of Economic Development and Commerce
- Secretary of Education
- Secretary of Family Affairs
- Secretary of Health
- Secretary of Housing
- Secretary of Justice
- Secretary of Labor and Human Resources
- Secretary of Natural and Environmental Resources
- Secretary of Public Safety
- Secretary of Sports and Recreation
- Secretary of State
- Secretary of Transportation and Public Works
- Secretary of Treasury

== Departments ==
There are currently 16 executive departments; all of them equivalent to that of ministries in parliamentary systems. Each executive department is responsible of a specific sector of public administration and provides a related public service to the citizens of Puerto Rico. All departments are capable of generating revenue through the issuance of fines, or through the collection of license fees and taxes. These revenues are then allocated to the government's primary operating fund: the Puerto Rico General Fund. The current departments (and their names in Spanish) are:

- Department of Agriculture (Departamento de Agricultura)
- Department of Consumer Affairs (Departamento de Asuntos del Consumidor)
- Department of Corrections and Rehabilitation (Departamento de Correcciones y Rehabilitación)
- Department of Economic Development and Commerce (Departamento de Desarrollo Económico y Comercio)
- Department of Education (Departamento de Educación)
- Department of Family Affairs (Departamento de Asuntos Familiares)
- Department of Health (Departamento de Salud)
- Department of Housing (Departamento de Vivienda)
- Department of Justice (Departamento de Justicia)
- Department of Labor and Human Resources (Departamento de Trabajo y Recursos Humanos)
- Department of Natural and Environmental Resources (Departamento de Recursos Naturales y Ambientales)
- Department of Public Safety (Departamento de Seguridad Pública)
- Department of Sports and Recreation (Departamento de Deportes y Recreación)
- Department of State (Departamento de Estado)
- Department of Transportation and Public Works (Departamento de Transporte y Obras Públicas)
- Department of Treasury (Departamento de Hacienda)

== Cabinet-level officers ==
The Cabinet-level officers of the executive branch of the government of Puerto Rico are the heads of the executive agencies that report directly to the Governor of Puerto Rico or to the Chief of Staff who also happen to not be Secretaries of an executive department nor members of an executive office—except for the Directors of the Office of Management and Budget and the Planning Board who are considered Cabinet-level officers. All the Cabinet-level officers are at the same bureaucratic level as of the Secretaries and together with the Council of Secretaries compose the Cabinet of Puerto Rico.

- Chief of Staff
- Commissioner of Safety and Public Protection (dissolved)
- Director of the Office of Management and Budget
- Director of the Puerto Rico Federal Affairs Administration
- Inspector General of Puerto Rico
- President of the Planning Board
- President of the Puerto Rico Government Development Bank (dissolved) (Note: The President of the Puerto Rico Government Development Bank (GDB) is considered a Cabinet-level officer since the GDB serves as the government's fiscal agent and financial advisor even though the GDB is a government-owned corporation.)

== Fiscal agent and financing ==
The fiscal agent and financing agencies are a group of government-owned corporations of Puerto Rico that manage all aspects of financing for the executive branch. The Puerto Rico Government Development Bank Act establishes that the Puerto Rico Government Development Bank (GDB) serves as the fiscal agent of the government of Puerto Rico. Regardless of its special status, the GDB and all other financing agencies report to the Secretariat of Governance and the Chief of Staff. These agencies are comprised by:

- Authority for the Financing of Housing
- Authority for the Financing of Industrial, Touristic, Educative, Medical, and Environmental Control Facilities (AFICA)
- Authority for the Financing of the Infrastructure of Puerto Rico
- Economic Development Bank
- Government Development Bank (Note: Presided by a Cabinet-level officer.)
- Municipal Financing Agency
- Public Financing Corporation
- Public-Private Partnerships Authority
- Urgent Interest Fund Corporation (COFINA)

== Government-owned corporations ==
The government-owned corporations of Puerto Rico are autonomous, independent, and self-sufficient legal entities owned entirely or in large by the executive branch. These corporations engage in commercial activities with their revenues ultimately being allocated towards the government's treasury: the Puerto Rico Consolidated Fund. As of December 2012, the executive branch owned 50 government-owned corporations as follows:

- Automobile Accident Compensation Administration
- Agricultural Insurance Corporation
- Aqueducts and Sewers Authority
- Authority for the Financing of Housing
- Authority for the Financing of Industrial, Touristic, Educative, Medical, and Environmental Control Facilities (AFICA)
- Authority for the Financing of the Infrastructure of Puerto Rico
- Caño Martín Peña ENLACE Project Corporation
- Cardiovascular Center of Puerto Rico and the Caribbean Corporation
- Commission on Traffic Safety
- Comprehensive Cancer Center
- Conservatory of Music Corporation
- Convention Center District Authority
- Corporation for the Development of Arts, Sciences, and Cinematographic Industry
- Corporation for Industries for the Blind, Mentally Retarded People, and Other Handicapped People
- Credit Unions Supervision and Insurance Corporation
- Economic Development Bank
- Electric Power Authority
- Government Development Bank
- Health Insurance Administration
- Highways and Transportation Authority
- Industrial Development Company
- Integral Development for the Cantera Peninsula Company
- Institute of Puerto Rican Culture
- Lands Administration
- Lands Authority
- Maritime Shipping Authority
- Medical Services Administration
- Metropolitan Bus Authority
- Municipal Financing Agency
- Musical Arts Corporation
- Musical Scenic Arts Corporation
- National Guard Institutional Trust
- National Parks Company
- Performing Arts Center Corporation
- Ports Authority
- Port of the Americas Administration
- Public Broadcasting Corporation
- Public Buildings Authority
- Sales Tax Financing Corporation
- School of Plastic Arts
- Solid Waste Management Authority
- State Insurance Fund Corporation
- Symphony Orchestra Corporation
- Trade and Export Company
- Tourism Company
- Training and Work Enterprises Corporation
- University of Puerto Rico

== Other agencies ==
There are other agencies that belong to the executive branch that aren't either executive offices, executive departments, subagencies, nor government-owned corporations. These agencies tend to be regulatory bodies or agencies that provide some sort of public service whose goal is not commercial profit. Regardless of their purpose, these agencies report to the Secretariat of Governance and the Chief of Staff, and some of them are even presided by a cabinet-level officer. This group of agencies is comprised by:

- Administration of the Retirement Systems of Employees of the Government of the Commonwealth of Puerto Rico and the Judicature
- Appeals Commission on Public Service
- Commission on Cooperative Development
- Commission on Investigation, Prosecution, and Appeal
- Commission on Public Service
- Commission on Safety and Public Protection
- Education Council
- Federal Affairs Administration
- General Services Administration
- Industrial Commission
- Institute of Statistics
- Labour Relations Board
- Office of Government Ethics
- Office of the Commissioner of Financial Institutions
- Office of the Commissioner of Municipal Affairs
- Office of the Electoral Comptroller
- Office of the Special Independent Prosecutor's Panel
- Office of the Solicitor General
- Office of Training and Advice in Labour and Human Resource Management
- Review Board of Permits and Land Use
- State Agency for Emergency and Disaster Management
- State Elections Commission
- Teachers Retirement System
- Telecommunications Regulatory Board
