= Telegramgate =

2019 Puerto Rican political scandal

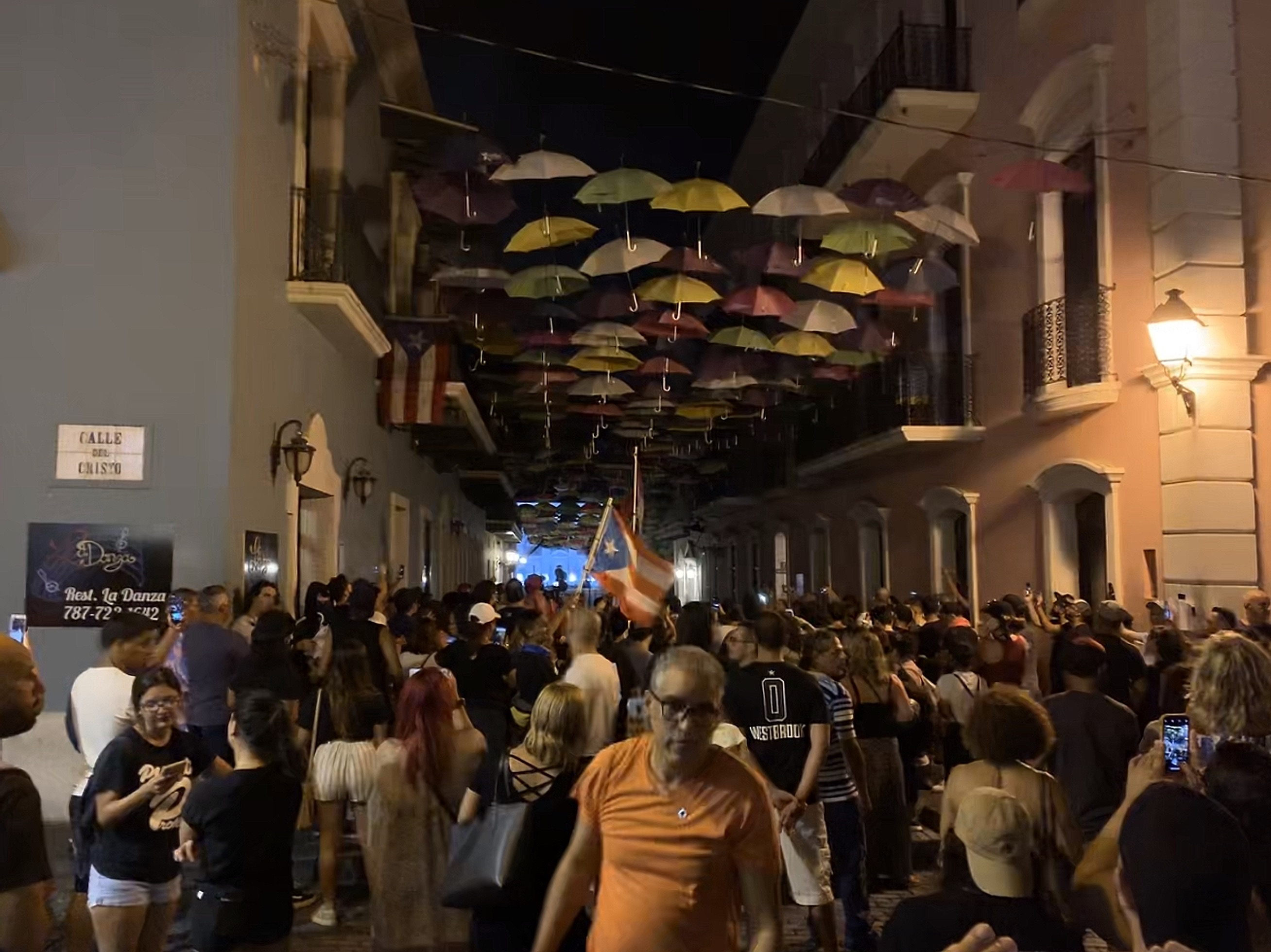
- Protesters gather at the intersection of Calle Fortaleza and Calle del Cristo on the night of July 13, 2019, near La Fortaleza, the Governor's executive mansion, seen in far the background.
- Date: July 8, 2019 – August 12, 2019 (1 month, 1 week and 4 days)
- Location: Main demonstrations in Puerto Rico: San Juan (Old San Juan, Expreso Las Américas, Franklin Delano Roosevelt Avenue); Solidarity protests: Dozens of other cities in Puerto Rico, other parts of the United States, and abroad
- Caused by: Leak of hundreds of pages of vulgar, racist, and homophobic comments in a private group chat between Governor Ricardo Rosselló and members of his cabinet, and political crisis
- Goals: Resignation of Rosselló as the Governor of Puerto Rico
- Methods: Civil unrest, graffiti, Internet activism, picketing, protest art, sit-ins, street protests
- Result: Resignation of Rosselló as the Governor of Puerto Rico effective August 2 at 5:00 p.m. AST
- Concessions: July 21: Rosselló announced his immediate resignation as president of his political party, seeking no reelection in 2020.; July 24: Rosselló announced his resignation as Governor of Puerto Rico, effective August 2 at 5:00 p.m. AST, leaving office as scheduled.

Parties
Protesters no centralized leadership	Government of Puerto Rico: Puerto Rico Police

Lead figures
Protesters no centralized leadership	Ricardo Rosselló (Governor of Puerto Rico)

Casualties
- Deaths: 0
- Injuries: At least 20
- Arrested: At least 16

Telegramgate, also known as Chatgate, RickyLeaks and Verano del '19 (transl. Summer of '19), was a political scandal involving Ricardo Rosselló, Governor of Puerto Rico. The scandal unfolded on July 8, 2019, with the leak of hundreds of pages of a group chat between Rosselló and members of his cabinet on the messaging application Telegram. The document exposed racist and homophobic conversations that targeted several individuals and groups, including discussions on how the members of the group chat would conspire to use the media to their gain and target political opponents. The leak came in the midst of allegations by the former Secretary of Treasury of Puerto Rico, Raúl Maldonado Gautier, that his department boasted an "institutional mafia," in which Rosselló was involved. The leaks also surfaced a year after a previous scandal, dubbed WhatsApp Gate, involving other members of Rosselló's cabinet.

Mass protests arose, reaching up to a million people at a single event on July 17. On July 22, up to a million protesters shut down the Expreso Las Américas, an 11-lane highway. While several of his staff resigned in the wake of the leaks, Rosselló initially refused to resign as governor and simply resigned as president of the governing pro-statehood New Progressive Party on July 21 and said he would not seek re-election in the 2020 Puerto Rican general election. By July 22, there had been eleven consecutive days of protests, near La Fortaleza, the Governor's residence in San Juan. On July 24, Rosselló announced that he would resign as governor on August 2. On August 2, Pedro Pierluisi, former resident commissioner of Puerto Rico was sworn in immediately after Rosselló left office, but was later ordered by the Supreme Court of Puerto Rico to abandon, since his swearing-in was not constitutional. Ultimately, the secretary of justice of Puerto Rico, Wanda Vázquez Garced, who was initially reluctant to take office, was sworn in as governor of Puerto Rico. She became the second woman to assume the office and the first person to take over the position by succession and not by a democratic election.

== Telegram chat dialog ==
On July 8, 2019, a small segment of Telegram chat messages between Ricardo Rosselló and various members of his cabinet, former advisors, and former campaign managers were leaked and spread by the local press. The full 889-page copy of the conversations was published July 13, by local investigative news agency Puerto Rico Center for Investigative Journalism.

Among those identified in the chat logs are:

- Ricardo Rosselló, governor of Puerto Rico
- Christian Sobrino, governor's representative to the PROMESA board
- Ramón Rosario, secretary of public affairs of La Fortaleza (governor's residence)
- Elías Sánchez, 2016 political campaign director, lobbyist
- Rafael Cerame, communications consultant
- Carlos Bermúdez, communications consultant
- Ricardo Llerandi, chief of staff to the governor
- Alfonso Orona, legal counsel to the governor
- Anthony Maceira, secretary of public relations
- Edwin Miranda, publicist, founder of the advertising agency KOI
- Raúl Maldonado Gautier, secretary of treasury
- Luis G. Rivera Marín, secretary of state

The chat messages were found by the general public to be vulgar, homophobic and racist and described as a "bro" culture among the group. Chat members referred to New York City Council member Melissa Mark-Viverito as a "whore", made homophobic remarks about Ricky Martin, and called San Juan mayor Carmen Yulín Cruz "una tremenda HP [hija de puta]" - transl. "a total daughter of a bitch". The chats revealed plans to control the media and smear political opponents, and Rosselló shared confidential state information with the non-government officials in the chat.

Other parts of the conversations joked about the death toll from Hurricane Maria. When interviewed by Democracy Now on July 23, 2019, Carla Minet from the Puerto Rico Center for Investigative Journalism stated that it was those jokes that were particularly painful as many Puerto Ricans had been unable to properly bury their dead in the chaotic days that followed Hurricane Maria, and reading chats where the governor mentioned "cadavers", and did not stop others from joking about the dead, was seen as an unforgivable betrayal.

== Impact ==
=== Government ===
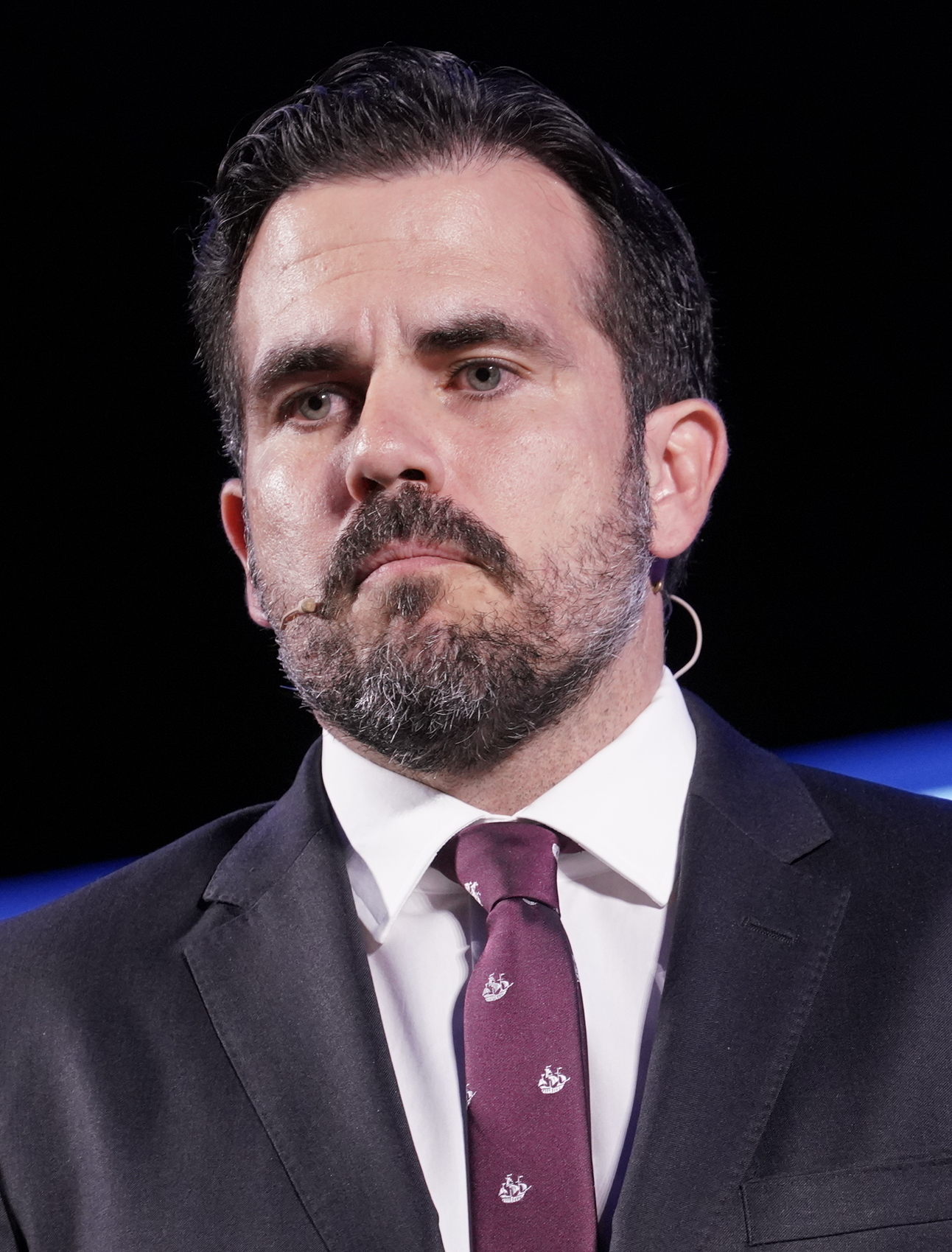
Ricardo Rosselló in April 2019

After Raúl Maldonado Gautier vacated his post, Rosselló nominated Francisco Parés Alicea to the position of Secretary of Treasury on July 1, who was functioning as interim at the time and as assistant secretary of internal revenue prior to taking over as interim. He was confirmed by the Senate a week later and assumed office on July 22, the day after Rosselló announced his resignation as governor. Prior to the full log's publication, on July 10, 2019, a 32-count federal indictment resulted in the Federal Bureau of Investigation (FBI) arresting six people, including two former high-ranking Puerto Rico government officials who served in Rosselló's government, on charges of conspiracy and other crimes in connection with millions of dollars in federal Medicaid and education funds. Rosselló was vacationing in France at the time of the leaks on July 11, which forced him to go back to the island.

Several members of Rosselló's cabinet, who were involved and part of the chat log conversations, resigned following its publication of the document. Luis Rivera Marín and Christian Sobrino resigned from their positions in the government on July 13; In addition, press secretary Dennise Peréz resigned on July 19, and chief of staff Ricardo Llerandi followed suit on July 23. On July 17, the Puerto Rico Department of Justice ordered that all participants be interviewed and have their phones inspected. The FBI would neither confirm nor deny that it is investigating those involved. On July 19, the House of Representatives of Puerto Rico formed an impeachment committee, its members being three attorneys appointed by House leader Carlos "Johnny" Méndez, to consider whether Rosselló committed impeachable offenses based on the chat log. On July 23, a judge issued an order requiring all participants in the conversation to surrender their phones, which were then seized. On July 24, the committee recommended five articles of impeachment against Governor Rosselló. On July 28, the Secretary of Public Affairs, Anthony Maceira, resigned.

=== Resignation of Rosselló ===
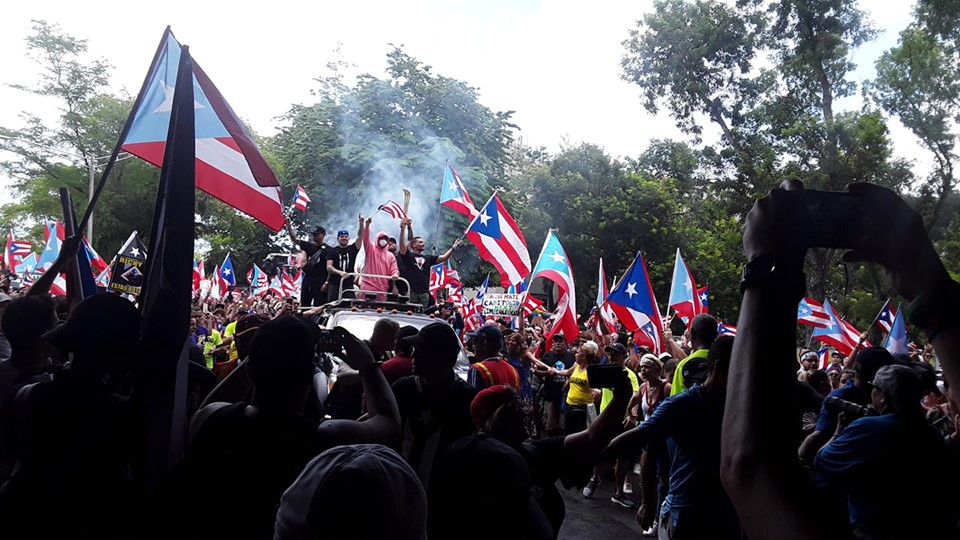
Protesters celebrating the resignation of Ricardo Rosselló in San Juan, the day after the announcement. Residente, Bad Bunny and Ricky Martin (center, L–R) were among many public figures that demanded Rosselló's resignation.

On July 21, Rosselló announced that he would not seek re-election in the 2020 Puerto Rican general election, but he initially refused to resign as governor. He also announced his resignation as President of the New Progressive Party. However, three days later, Rosselló announced that he would resign as governor, effective August 2, 2019, at 5:00 p.m. AST, and was to be replaced by Justice Secretary Wanda Vázquez Garced, who, at the time, was the next eligible cabinet member to become Rosselló's successor; most of Rosselló's immediate cabinet members had either resigned or were relieved of their positions by Rosselló. As Treasury Secretary, Pares Alicea would have been next to succeed, but he did not meet the required minimum age of 35, in which case, the next in line was Secretary of Justice Vázquez Garced, who announced in a tweet that she was not interested in becoming governor and that she hoped Rosselló appointed someone before his last day.

=== Succession ===
Before Rosselló's resignation was effective, he announced his nomination of Pedro Pierluisi to the position of Secretary of State on July 31, with the intention of having him succeed the office of Governor of Puerto Rico. Pierluisi was sworn in the same day while a new document with an additional 100 pages of the controversial chat was released by journalist Sandra Rodríguez Cotto. The very next day, August 1, the Senate of Puerto Rico denied Pierluisi confirmation before Rosselló's resignation, thus preventing him from becoming acting governor. Pedro Pierluisi previously served as resident commissioner of Puerto Rico during the administrations of Luis Fortuño (2009–2013) and Alejandro García Padilla (2013–2017), and served as Secretary of Justice of Puerto Rico during the Pedro Rosselló administration (1993–1997). Pierluisi was Ricardo Rosselló's former adversary in the 2016 primaries of their party, which resulted in Rosselló's victory over Pierluisi as the New Progressive Party's nominee for Governor of Puerto Rico in the 2016 general election. Pierluisi would eventually win the 2020 primaries for the New Progressive Party and be elected governor of Puerto Rico in the 2020 general election.

After confirmation hearings, Pierluisi was confirmed as secretary of state by the House of Representatives on August 2; the Senate still had to conduct a ratification to confirm Pierluisi as secretary of state. However, he was sworn in as governor of Puerto Rico on August 2, at 5:00 p.m. AST, immediately after Rosselló's term ended, despite not being confirmed by the Senate. He did so relying on a law that stated that when the legislature is on recess, any nomination is legitimate until the legislature goes back in session. As a result, the President of the Senate, Thomas Rivera Schatz, challenged the legitimacy of his ascent to office in the Supreme Court of Puerto Rico. Protests continued, with their main focus shifting to calling for Pierluisi's resignation. The Supreme Court then ruled his ascent to power unconstitutional. Afterwards, the then-Secretary of Justice, Wanda Vázquez was sworn in as the new governor of Puerto Rico, becoming the second woman to assume the office and the first person to take over the position by succession and not by a democratic election.

=== Unidos por Puerto Rico controversy ===
In July 2019, among calls for her husband to resign due to a scandal stemming from his involvement in the incriminating group chat, his wife, First Lady Beatriz Rosselló, was criticized for her management of Unidos por Puerto Rico (transl. United for Puerto Rico), a non-profit organization she created after Hurricane María which had been under investigation by the FBI. The First Lady had pointed out as having delayed the distribution of disaster relief supplies. In August 2018, at least 10 trailers which held these supplies were found abandoned in a lot near a state election office; according to The New York Times, they had "broke[n] open and became infested by rats". A spokeswoman for the elections commission said the offices were being used as a storage point at the request of the First Lady. Raúl "Rauli" Maldonado Nieves, the son of former Treasury Secretary Raúl Maldonado Gautier, claimed to have been present in a meeting in which Ricardo Rosselló demanded an amendment to an audit report into the containers as, according to Maldonado Nieves, the report would have "affected" the First Lady. The FBI opened an investigation into the finances and donation requests of Unidos por Puerto Rico to handle Hurricane Maria-related donations. Unidos por Puerto Rico, which received $41 million in donations, was run for a time by Jorge del Pino, brother-in-law of lobbyist Elías Sánchez, who was also involved in the group chat scandal.

=== Investigation ===
On August 28, 2020, the executive director of the Puerto Rico Government Ethics Office announced the investigation into the leaked 889-page chat dialog between Rosselló and members of his cabinet was completed. The investigation, which began on July 15, 2019, was closed due to inability to authenticate evidence, an essential element for the imputation of unethical conduct, rendering impossible for the administrative prosecution of its participants. As part of the investigation process, the ethics office's lawyers interviewed seven witnesses, including chat participants, and six affidavits were taken. Additionally, two other chat participants were contacted, but declined to cooperate with the investigation.

Witnesses that were interviewed admitted the instant-messaging application Telegram was the main form of communication between Rosselló and members of his cabinet but declined to authenticate the content of the leaked document, expressing malevolous alterations were presented on it. The ethics office's lawyers attempted to prove the authenticity of the content of the conversations through a certification request to the instant-messaging company itself, but were unsuccessful; the company is limited to release information on suspicion of terrorism to relevant authorities, such as IP address and telephone number, and not the content of conversations. The Department of Justice of Puerto Rico was also asked to cooperate in providing extracted information from cell phones of some of the chat's participants, with the purpose of obtaining unaltered and authentic content directly from the source, but was not shared due to the criminal investigation they're still conducting.

On November 10, 2020, special prosecutors handed their investigation into the Rosselló administration's involvement in the chat scandal to the Special Independent Prosecutor's Panel, after ten days of redacting the document. The Panel submitted their evidence to the Institute of Forensic Sciences. The Institute's detailed analysis concluded that the PDF document purporting to be a transcript of the Telegram chat "is not an original, that it is not a complete document, and that it has been modified."

Ultimately, on November 24, 2020, the panel determined that criminal elements were not set up in the crimes that were described in the report, due to lack of evidence to sustain the accusations, adding that there were no loss of public funds or damage to public property. The panel also didn't find that the content of the chat led to carrying out a crime.

== Reactions ==
=== Civilian ===
Protest in front of the Capitol of Puerto Rico on July 21, 2019

Protests calling for the governor to resign began upon his return to Puerto Rico from France on July 11, 2019, and continued as of July 22. A July 17 protest in Old San Juan had an attendance of 500,000 people at its peak. Protests were also held in other municipalities, cities, and countries. Another protest which was held in Old San Juan on July 22, also drew hundreds of thousands and was reported to have set a protest record, with NBC News estimating the crowd size to be potentially over 1 million by 1pm (AST). The crowd size was reported to have eclipsed the previous record set when protestors gathered in 2004 to denounce the US Navy training missions in the island-municipality of Vieques.

Many protested in creative ways, while doing yoga, holding signs while scuba diving under water, on horse-back, drumming, with face-painting, via group prayers, and with public demonstration of reminders of those who died in Hurricane María. On July 19, there was a cacerolazo (transl. a mass-banging of pots and pans), where people across the islands banged on pots and pans, demanding his resignation. Banging pots and pans has been a method of protesting by other Latin American nations in the past. In Puerto Rico residents were timing the banging of pots and pans for 8 p.m. (AST) each night. A song, "Afilando los cuchillos" (transl. Sharpening the Knives), with lyrics by Bad Bunny, Residente, and iLe, was released during the protests.

After Rosselló announced his resignation, the song "Te Boté" (transl. I Dumped You) was sung by protesters as they happily ripped down posters with his image and dumped them in garbage bins. Perreo, a doggy-style dancing of reggaeton music was mentioned by people of Puerto Rico as contributing to the governor leaving office; Pedro Rosselló, Ricardo's father, had criminalized reggaetón during his term as governor of Puerto Rico (1993–2001) in such length that record store employees were arrested for selling the genre's music. After the resignation announcement, celebrations took place in front of La Fortaleza with people dancing perreo, after weeks of protesting and demands.

=== Political ===
Congressman Raúl Grijalva (D-Arizona), chair of the House Natural Resources Committee, which oversees Puerto Rico policy, called for the governor to resign amid the scandal. Jenniffer González, Puerto Rico's sole representative in Congress, said that she thought Rosselló should not seek re-election the following year as a result of the incident. Thomas Rivera Schatz, President of the Senate of Puerto Rico, took to Twitter and Facebook to call upon Rosselló and every government official included in the chat to resign; Carlos "Johnny" Méndez, Speaker of the House of Representatives of Puerto Rico, did the same. On July 13, former governor Sila María Calderón called upon Rosselló to resign as well as former governor Luis Fortuño who published a letter on his social media. On July 19, former San Antonio mayor and secretary of Housing and Urban Development Julian Castro became the first 2020 Democratic presidential candidate to call for Rosselló's resignation, followed by two fellow presidential contenders, Democratic Congresswoman Tulsi Gabbard and Senator Bernie Sanders.

=== 2020 primaries ===
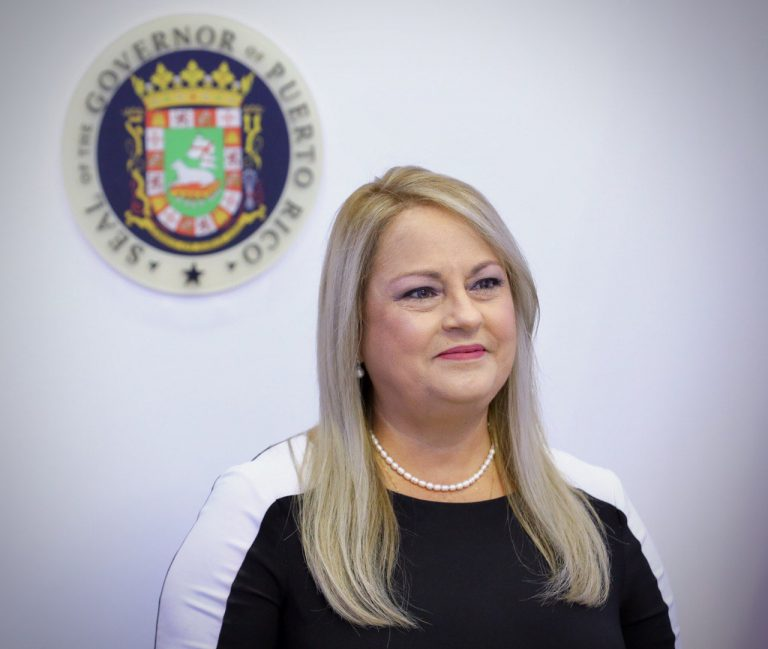
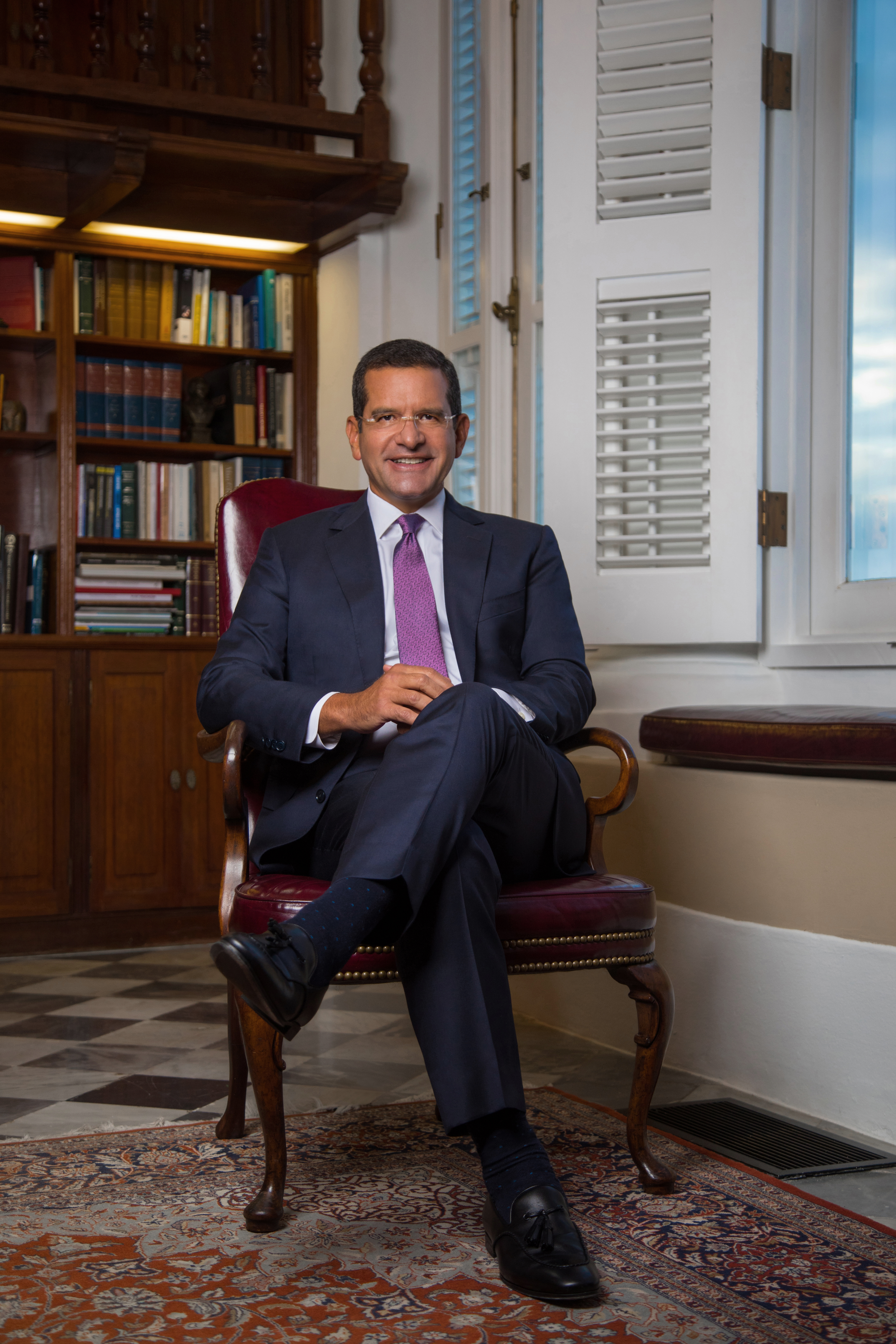
Governor Wanda Vázquez (top) lost the 2020 PNP primaries against the former de facto governor Pedro Pierluisi (bottom) in August 2020, while the latter eventually won the 2020 general election by a slim plurality.

The Puerto Rico primary elections were held on August 9 and 16, 2020, among nationwide controversy with the Puerto Rico State Commission on Elections' inability to deliver voting ballots in time on August 9. Governor Wanda Vázquez Garced and former resident commissioner Pedro Pierluisi both ran for the New Progressive Party nomination for Governor of Puerto Rico, resulting the latter as the winner.

=== 2020 general elections ===
The 2020 Puerto Rico general elections were held on November 3, 2020, with six candidates running for the office of Governor of Puerto Rico. Former resident commissioner Pedro Pierluisi, who Ricardo Rosselló chose to succeed as governor of Puerto Rico after the latter announced his resignation, was declared the winner by the Puerto Rico State Commission on Elections. He was sworn in as governor of Puerto Rico on January 2, 2021, as per the Constitution of Puerto Rico.

== See also ==
- Hillary Clinton email controversy
- United States diplomatic cables leak
- United States government group chat leaks
- List of -gate scandals and controversies
- United States Navy in Vieques, Puerto Rico
