= List of Puerto Rico executive offices =

The executive offices of the executive branch of the government of Puerto Rico comprise the offices ascribed directly to the Office of the Governor of Puerto Rico and whose presiding officers are appointed directly by the Governor without the advice and consent of the Senate or any other body. The offices are charged with the tasks, functions, or program areas delegated to it by the Governor or the Chief of Staff, not contrary to any specific provision of Puerto Rican law or the Constitution of Puerto Rico.

== Offices ==
Agency	Current officer
Environmental Quality Board	to be nominated
Office of Management and Budget	Carlos Rivas Quiñones
Office of the Inspector General	to be nominated
Planning Board	to be nominated
Secretariat of Governance	Ingrid Vila Biaggi
