= Law enforcement in Puerto Rico =

Component of the criminal justice system of Puerto Rico

Law enforcement in Puerto Rico is one of three major components of the criminal justice system of Puerto Rico, along with courts and corrections. Although there exists an inherent interrelatedness between the different groups that make up the criminal justice system based on their crime deterrence purpose, each component operates independently from one another. However, the judiciary is vested with the power to make legal determinations regarding the conduct of the other two components.

Apart from maintaining order and service functions, the purpose of policing is the investigation of suspected criminal activity and the referral of the results of investigations and of suspected criminals to the courts. Law enforcement, to varying degrees at different levels of government and in different agencies, is also commonly charged with the responsibilities of deterring criminal activity and of preventing the successful commission of crimes in progress; the service and enforcement of warrants, writs and other orders of the courts.

Law enforcement agencies are also involved in providing first response to emergencies and other threats to public safety; the protection of certain public facilities and infrastructure; the maintenance of public order; the protection of public officials; and the operation of some correctional facilities (usually at the local level).

== Agencies ==
- Commission on Safety and Public Protection
- Department of Justice
- FEI
- Puerto Rico Department of Public Safety consisting of the Puerto Rico Police Bureau,
- FURA
- Municipal Police
- National Guard (Note: Although the National Guard is a military organization, it can be called to uphold the law through martial law or by an executive order.)
- Puerto Rico State Guard
- Natural Resources Ranger Corps
- Puerto Rico Police
- Puerto Rico Law Enforcement Academy

== Posts ==
- Adjutant General
- Attorney General
- Commissioner of Safety and Public Protection
- FEI
- Secretary of Justice
- Superintendent of the Puerto Rico Police

== See also ==
- Crime in Puerto Rico
