= Fiscal sponsor =

Fiscal sponsor may refer to:

- Fiscal sponsorship, a legal arrangement among non-profit organizations to minimize administrative overhead
- Fiscal agent, a proxy that manages fiscal matters
