= EQB =

EQB may refer to:

- Equitable Bank, a Canadian commercial bank
- Izz ad-Din al-Qassam Brigades, the military wing of Hamas
- Puerto Rico Environmental Quality Board
- Psalm 133, Ecce quam bonum
- Mercedes-Benz EQB, an electric sport utility vehicle
