= 1952 Puerto Rican referendum =

Ballot measure in Puerto Rico

A double referendum was held in Puerto Rico on 4 November 1952. Voters were asked whether they approved of amendments to the constitution regarding federal order and whether private schools should be financed with public money. Both were approved by 87.8% of voters.

== Results ==
=== Constitutional amendments ===
Choice	Votes	%
For	420,036	87.78
Against	58,484	12.22
Total	478,520	100.00
Registered voters/turnout	883,219	–
Source: Nohlen

=== Private school funding ===
Choice	Votes	%
For	419,515	87.82
Against	58,204	12.18
Total	477,719	100.00
Registered voters/turnout	883,219	–
Source: Nohlen
