= Office of the Governor of Puerto Rico =

Governmental office

Office overview
- Formed: July 25, 1952; 74 years ago
- Preceding Office: Office of Puerto Rico
- Jurisdiction: executive branch
- Headquarters: San Juan, Puerto Rico
- Office executive: Jenniffer González-Colón, Governor
- Child agencies: Office of Management and Budget; Planning Board; Secretariat of Governance
- Website: www.fortaleza.gobierno.pr

The Office of the Governor of Puerto Rico —commonly called La Fortaleza (English: The Fortress)— consists of the immediate staff of the governor of Puerto Rico, as well as multiple levels of support staff reporting to the governor. The office is headed by the governor and its headquarters are located at La Fortaleza. The office used to be called the Office of Puerto Rico.

Since 1979, the Puerto Rico Federal Affairs Administration (PRFAA) serves as the Office of the Governor of Puerto Rico in Washington, DC.

== Background ==
All executive offices as created by law are ascribed either to the governor or to the Office of the Governor. However, in virtue of the executive powers vested upon the Governor by Article IV of the Constitution and Law No. 104 of 1956 —which include the faculty to appoint officers and to delegate functions— the Governor issues an executive order and thereafter delegates the management of almost all the executive offices to the Chief of Staff. Only two offices, the Office of Management and Budget and the Planning Board remain in direct relation to the Governor afterwards.

== Direct offices ==
- Office of Management and Budget
- Planning Board
- Secretariat of Governance

== Delegated to the Chief of Staff ==
- Environmental Quality Board
- Office of the Inspector General
