= Puerto Rico Governor's Advisory Board =

- Secretariat of Governance
- Appointer: Governor; Chief of Staff
- Term length: 4 years
- Formation: Executive order proclaimed in virtue of Law No. 104 of 1956

The Puerto Rico Governor's Advisory Board is the group of executive advisors that advise the Governor of Puerto Rico, and are appointed either by the governor or the chief of staff. The board is charged with the tasks, functions, or program areas delegated to it by the governor or the chief of staff, not contrary to any specific provision of Puerto Rican law or the Constitution of Puerto Rico. The board, together with other staff appointed by the chief of staff, constitute the Secretariat of Governance.

== Duties and responsibilities ==
The duties and responsibilities of the board vary greatly from one administration to another, and in fact, there is no legal requirement that the Governor even continues or creates it. Nevertheless, one of the first acts undertaken by sworn in Governors is to issue an executive order proclaiming the continuation of the board, albeit with different members. This order also establishes the board's duties and responsibilities as the governor deems necessary. This proclamation is done in virtue of the executive powers vested upon the governor by Article IV of the Constitution and Law No. 104 of 1956 which include the faculty to appoint officers and to delegate functions.
