= Secretary of Government of Puerto Rico =

The Secretary of Government of Puerto Rico may refer to:

- the Secretary of Government of Puerto Rico (minister) - the Chief of Staff of the executive branch of the government of Puerto Rico
- the Secretary of Government of Puerto Rico (ministry) - the ministry led by the Chief of Staff
