= Pedro A. Gelabert =

Puerto Rican scientist

Secretary of the Puerto Rico Department of Natural and Environmental Resources
- In office 1993–1996
- Governor: Pedro Rosselló

Personal details
- Born: September 10, 1933 (age 92) Arecibo, Puerto Rico
- Education: Tulane University (BS); University of Michigan (MS)

Pedro Antonio Gelabert (born September 10, 1933 in Arecibo, Puerto Rico), graduated from Tulane University in New Orleans, Louisiana. Gelabert served as Secretary of the Puerto Rico Department of Natural and Environmental Resources from 1993 to 1996 during the governorship of Pedro Rosselló, and as Chairman of the Puerto Rico Environmental Quality Board from 1977 to 1984 during the governorship of Carlos Romero Barceló.

Graduated from the New York Military Academy in 1951. Earned a Bachelor's in science (Geology) from Tulane University and later a Master of Science from the University of Michigan in Ann Arbor, Michigan.

He was drafted by the United States Army and was stationed at Fort Story in Virginia Beach, Virginia. U.S. Geological Survey; Physical Science Assistant (Geology) from Aug. 1960 to Aug. 1967. Chief Geologist, Engineering Geology Section; Puerto Rico Department of Transportation and Public Works from Sept 1967 to Feb. 1968. A geologist, Gelabert also served as Director of the Caribbean Office for the United States Environmental Protection Agency from 1985 to 1992. At the federal level, he has been a part of the United States delegation to the Summit of the Americas, as well as the meetings to develop the Action Plan of the Wider Caribbean Region of the United Nations Environmental Program, or UNEP. On behalf of the United States of America, he was a signatory at the 1983 Cartagena Convention of the Conference of Plenipotentiaries on the Protection and Development of the Marine Environment for the Wider Caribbean Region. He is currently a member of the State Committee of Epscor-Puerto Rico.

== Honors and Recognitions ==
During a 50-year-plus career helping protect the environment, Mr. Gelabert has received:

-the Environmental Citizen of the Millennium Award by the Puerto Rico Environmental Quality Board (1999)

-the Environmental Award for Outstanding Service by the Institute of Engineers, Architects and Surveyors of the Dominican Republic (2002)

-the Dixy Lee Ray Award by the American Society of Mechanical Engineers (2004)

-the Gold Medal for Exceptional Service from the United States Environmental Protection Agency (2000)
