= Puerto Rico Education Council =

Agency of the executive branch of the government of Puerto Rico

Puerto Rico Council of Education
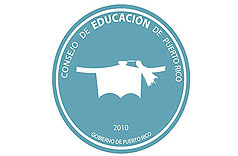

Agency overview
- Formed: July 26, 2010; 16 years ago
- Preceding agencies: Council on General Education; Council on Higher Education
- Jurisdiction: executive branch
- Headquarters: San Juan, Puerto Rico
- Agency executives: Luis Gerardo Rivera Morón, President; Carmen Luz Berrios Rivera, Executive Director
- Parent agency: Secretaria of Governance
- Key document: Reorganization Plan No. 2 of 2010
- Website: www.ce.pr.gov

The Council of Education of Puerto Rico —Spanish: Consejo de Educación de Puerto Rico (CEPR)— is an agency of the executive branch of the government of Puerto Rico and the governing body that administers public policy on education standards in Puerto Rico, as well as issuing licenses to establish and operate educational institutions in Puerto Rico. The council advocates for Puerto Rican citizens and permanent residents to have access to high-quality education at the level, in the format, and in the locations that they demand.

== History ==
The council was formed by consolidating the Council on General Education and the Council on Higher Education on July 26, 2010 as part of Reorganization Plan No. 2 of 2010.
