= Christian Sobrino =

Puerto Rican attorney

President of the Puerto Rico Government Development Bank
- In office January 2, 2017 – November 24, 2020
- Governor: Ricardo Rosselló
- Preceded by: Alberto Bacó Bagué

Personal details
- Born: San Juan, Puerto Rico
- Party: New Progressive
- Education: Boston College (BA); University of Puerto Rico School of Law (JD)

Christian Sobrino Vega is a Puerto Rican attorney and former public executive who held numerous high-level posts within the Administration of former Governor of Puerto Rico, Ricardo Rosselló. Sobrino holds a B.A. in English from Boston College and a J.D. from the University of Puerto Rico School of Law. Prior to entering public service, Sobrino practiced corporate law in various leading firms in Puerto Rico.

Sobrino was appointed on January 2, 2017 as Chief Economic Development Advisor to Governor Rosselló and president of the Puerto Rico Government Development Bank. Sobrino was responsible for developing and overseeing the execution of key policy initiatives of Governor Rosselló's administration, including the financial restructuring and winding down of the Government Development Bank for Puerto Ric; organizing a private non-profit destination marketing organization for the Island known as Discover Puerto Rico; establishing the Central Office of Recovery, Reconstruction and Resiliency (COR3) in the aftermath of Hurricanes Irma and Maria; preparing an interdisciplinary and multisectoral report recommending amendments to Puerto Rico's minimum wage; and leading government efforts to conduct meaningful energy sector reform and the privatization / concession of the Puerto Rico Electric Power Authority.

In July 2017, Sobrino was appointed to the Board of Directors of the Puerto Rico Fiscal Agency and Financial Advisory Authority (commonly known as AAFAF) and as the Governor's Representative to the Fiscal Oversight and Management Board of Puerto Rico. Sobrino became Chairman of the Board of Directors of AAFAF in November 2017 and its Executive Director on July 31, 2018. In these roles, Sobrino acted as the principal fiscal agent and officer of the Government of Puerto Rico overseeing its public debt restructuring and other liability management transactions.

In addition, Sobrino was the Chairman of the Boards of Directors of the Puerto Rico Infrastructure Financing Authority, the Puerto Rico Public Private Partnership Authority, and the Puerto Rico Government Retirement Board, as well as an exoficio member of the Board of Directors of the Puerto Rico Electric Power Authority.

In May 2019 Sobrino became the acting Chief Financial Officer of the Government of Puerto Rico and acting Director of the Puerto Rico Office of Management and Budget. Shortly thereafter, Sobrino resigned all of his posts on July 13, 2019 in the aftermath of the Telegramgate chat scandal that engulfed the Rosselló Administration. On November 24, 2020, the Office of the Panel of the Independent Prosecutor of Puerto Rico published a report of its investigations and findings and cleared Sobrino, and others involved, of any criminal liability arising out of the Telegramgate chat scandal.
