= Alberto Bacó Bagué =

Puerto Rican politician

Secretary of Economic Development and Commerce of Puerto Rico
- In office January 14, 2013 – 2017
- Governor: Alejandro García Padilla
- Preceded by: José R. Pérez Riera

Member of the Board of Trustees University of Puerto Rico
- In office March 2004 – December 2006

Director of the Puerto Rico Economic Development Bank
- In office January 1990 – December 1992

Personal details
- Party: PPD
- Education: University of Puerto Rico (BBA in Accounting and Finance; J.D.)
- Profession: lawyer certified public accountant (CPA)
- Website: LinkedIn profile

Alberto Bacó Bagué is a lawyer, a certified public accountant (CPA), and a legal and commercial advisor that served as Director of the Puerto Rico Economic Development Bank from 1990 to 1993. Previous to that Bacó served as Executive Vice President of the Puerto Rico Government Development Bank from 1989 to 1990. He also served as General Counsel at the Office of the Commissioner of Financial Institutions from 1986 to 1989, and was a member of the Board of Trustees of the University of Puerto Rico from 2004 to 2006. In his private life Bacó served as president and chief executive officer (CEO) of Marvel International and Bohío International from 2005 to 2011.

Graduated magna cum laude with a bachelor's degree in business administration from the University of Puerto Rico in 1979, and a Juris Doctor in 1984.

Bacó was appointed as the Secretary of Economic Development and Commerce of Puerto Rico —head of the Department of Economic Development and Commerce— after Alejandro García Padilla, Governor-elect, is sworn in and nominates him, and then later on the Senate of Puerto Rico convenes to provide their advice and consent on his nomination.
