= Puerto Rico Secretariat of Governance =

Office of the Chief of Staff of the Governor of Puerto Rico
Agency overview
- Formed: Proclaimed by each upcoming Governor through an executive order uninterruptedly since 1984.
- Jurisdiction: executive branch
- Headquarters: San Juan, Puerto Rico
- Agency executive: Zoé Laboy Alvarado, Chief of Staff
- Parent agency: Office of the Governor
- Child agency: all the executive departments and almost all other executive offices
- Key document: Law No. 104 of 1956

The Office of the Chief of Staff of the Governor of Puerto Rico (Spanish: Secretaría de la Gobernación de Puerto Rico) is the umbrella organization and government agency of the executive branch of the government of Puerto Rico that manages and oversees all the executive departments of the government of Puerto Rico and almost all executive agencies. The office is headed by the Puerto Rico Chief of Staff and is composed by the Governor's Advisory Board and all other staff appointed by the chief of staff. The office of the Chief of Staff is ascribed to the Office of the Governor.

== Duties and responsibilities ==
The duties and responsibilities of the office vary greatly from one administration to another, and in fact, there is no legal requirement that the Governor even continues or creates it. Nevertheless, one of the first acts undertaken by a new Governor once he is sworn in is to issue an executive order proclaiming the continuation of the agency, albeit with different members. This order also establishes the agency's duties and responsibilities as the Governor sees fit. This proclamation is done in virtue of the executive powers vested upon the Governor by Law No. 104 of 1956 which include the faculty to delegate functions.

== Agencies overseen ==
Both the Constitution of Puerto Rico and Puerto Rican law usually ascribe all executive offices to either the Governor or the Office of the Governor. The Governor then issues an executive order proclaiming the delegation of the management and over watch of such executive offices onto the office of the Chief of Staff. This proclamation is done in virtue of the executive powers vested upon the Governor by Law No. 104 of 1956 which include the faculty to delegate functions.

The agencies overseen by the Chief of Staff include all the executive departments of the government of Puerto Rico and almost all executive offices created either through an executive order or by law. The Office of Management and Budget and the Planning Board are the only executives offices not ascribed to the Chief of Staff —both report directly to the Office of the Governor of Puerto Rico.

The agencies overseen by the Chief of Staff include the following:

- Commission on Cooperative Development
- Commission on Safety and Public Protection
- Department of Agriculture
- Department of Consumer Affairs
- Department of Corrections and Rehabilitation
- Department of Economic Development and Commerce
- Department of Education
- Department of Family Affairs
- Department of Health
- Department of Housing
- Department of Justice
- Department of Labor and Human Resources
- Department of Natural and Environmental Resources
- Department of Sports and Recreation
- Department of State
- Department of Transportation and Public Works
- Department of Treasury
- Economic Development Bank
- Federal Affairs Administration
- Financing of Housing Authority
- Financing of Industrial, Touristic, Educative, Medical, and Environmental Control Facilities Authority (AFICA)
- Financing of Puerto Rico Infrastructure Authority
- Government Development Bank
- Municipal Financing Agency
- Public Financing Corporation
- Public-Private Partnerships Authority
- Urgent Interest Fund Corporation (COFINA)
