= Carlos Contreras Aponte =

Puerto Rican politician

Secretary of Transportation and Public Works of Puerto Rico
- In office 2017–2019
- Governor: Ricardo Rosselló

Personal details
- Born: Carlos Contreras Aponte San Juan, Puerto Rico
- Party: New Progressive
- Education: University of Puerto Rico at Mayagüez (BE, ME)

Carlos M. Contreras Aponte is a Puerto Rican civil engineer. He is the Secretary of Transportation and Public Works of Puerto Rico as well as the executive director of the Puerto Rico Highways and Transportation Authority. Contreras Aponte is the first blind person to lead the Department of Transportation.

Contreras Aponte was born in San Juan, Puerto Rico. He obtained his Bachelor's and master's degrees in Civil Engineering from the University of Puerto Rico at Mayagüez. He also holds various engineering certifications such as Professional Traffic Operations Engineer. In 2012, he was recognized as Distinguished Engineer by the Institute of Transportation Engineers. He was Chief of the Highway Authority's Office of Traffic Engineering. He is a member of Phi Sigma Alpha fraternity.
