= Ricardo Llerandi =

Puerto Rican politician

Puerto Rico Chief of Staff
- In office January 30, 2019 – August 2, 2019
- Preceded by: Raúl Maldonado
- Succeeded by: Zoé Laboy

Member of the Puerto Rico House of Representatives from the 14th District
- In office January 2, 2013 – January 2, 2017
- Preceded by: Paula Rodríguez Homs
- Succeeded by: José O. González Mercado

Personal details
- Born: Ricardo J. Llerandi Cruz Arecibo, Puerto Rico
- Party: New Progressive Party (PNP)
- Education: University of Puerto Rico at Arecibo (BA); Interamerican University of Puerto Rico School of Law (JD)
- Profession: Politician, attorney, notary, accountant

Ricardo J. Llerandi Cruz is a Puerto Rican politician who served as Chief of Staff of Puerto Rico in 2019. Llerandi is affiliated with the New Progressive Party (PNP). He was elected to the Puerto Rico House of Representatives in 2012 to represent District 14. After being reelected in 2016 in that election, he resigned to lead the Puerto Rico Trade and Export Company. Llerandi resigned his position as Chief of Staff on July 23, 2019 following his involvement in the Telegramgate scandal. Before entering politics, Llerandi worked as an accountant, notary, and civil attorney in the field of medical malpractices.

== Early years and studies ==
Ricardo Llerandi was born and raised in Arecibo, Puerto Rico. He completed his primary studies at the Colegio San Felipe, where he was part of the basketball, volleyball, and track and field teams. Llerandi was part of the Board of Honor and President of his class. He graduated from Trina Padilla High School where he was recognized for having one of the nation's highest scores on the College Board test.

Llerandi completed a bachelor's degree in Business Management at the University of Puerto Rico at Arecibo. He worked as an accountant for several years while also studying at law school. Llerandi completed his juris doctor from the Interamerican University of Puerto Rico School of Law in 2006. He worked as a notary and civil attorney with a focus on medical malpractices.

== Politics and public service ==
Llerandi was elected to the Puerto Rico House of Representatives at the 2012 general election. He was elected to represent District 14. Llerandi was reelected in 2016. However, a month after the election, Llerandi announced his resignation in order to lead the Puerto Rico Trade and Export Company.

In January 2019, Governor Ricardo Rosselló appointed Llerandi as Chief of Staff.

After his resignation in October 2019 he returned to his private practice as a lawyer and consultant.
