= Secretary of Natural and Environmental Resources of Puerto Rico =

Government of Puerto Rico

- Incumbent; Tania Vázquez Rivera since January 2, 2017; 9 years ago
- Department of Natural and Environmental Resources
- Nominator: Governor
- Appointer: Governor with advice and consent from the Senate
- Term length: 4 years
- Formation: Established by Law No. 23 of 1972 and Reorganization Plan No. 4 of 1993
- Website: http://www.drna.gobierno.pr

The Secretary of Natural and Environmental Resources of Puerto Rico (Spanish: Secretario de Recursos Naturales y Ambientales de Puerto Rico) is responsible for protecting, conserving, and managing the natural and environmental resources of Puerto Rico.

Daniel Galán Kercadó was the Secretary of Natural and Environmental Resources of Puerto Rico under governor Luis Fortuño. At least by 2013 he was no longer Secretary of the DNRA (the Spanish language acronym for the Department).

In 2017 Governor Ricardo Rosselló designated Tania Vazquez Rivera as Secretary of the DRNA.

== Secretaries ==
- 1972–1974: Cruz A. Matos
- 1974: Héctor López Pumarejo
- 1974–1976: Pedro Negrón Ramos
- 1977–1980: Fred V. Soltero Harrington
- 1981–1984: Hilda Díaz Soltero
- 1985–1986: Alejandro Santiago Nieves
- 1986–1988: Justo A. Méndez Rodriguez
- 1993–1996: Pedro A. Gelabert
- 2002–2004: Luis E. Rodríguez Rivera
- 2005–2008: Javier Vélez Arocho
- 2009–2013: Daniel J. Galán Kercado
- 2013–2016: Carmen R. Guerrero Pérez
- 2016: Nelson J. Santiago Marrero
- 2017–2020: Tania Vázquez Rivera
- 2021–2022: Rafael Marchago
- 2022–2024: Anaís Rodríguez Vega
- 2025– : Waldemar Quiles Rodríguez
