= Puerto Rico State Commission on Elections =

Agency of the executive branch of the government of Puerto Rico

State Commission on Elections
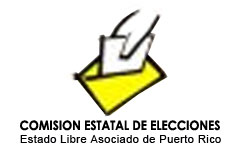

Agency overview
- Formed: December 20, 1977; 48 years ago
- Jurisdiction: Executive branch
- Headquarters: San Juan, Puerto Rico
- Agency executive: Hon. Francisco Rosado Colomer, President
- Key document: Act No. 4 of 1977
- Website: ceepur.org

The Puerto Rico State Commission on Elections (Spanish: Comisión Estatal de Elecciones de Puerto Rico, CEEPR or CEE-PUR) is the government agency of the executive branch of the government of Puerto Rico that oversees and manages elections in Puerto Rico as well as guaranteeing the right to vote to its citizens. The agency was created on December 20, 1977 by Act No. 4 of 1997.
