= Puerto Rico Office of the Special Independent Prosecutor's Panel =

Autonomous agency of the executive branch of the government of Puerto Rico

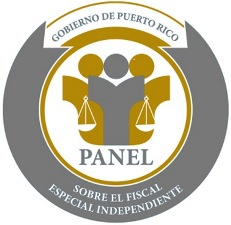

Agency overview
- Jurisdiction: Executive branch
- Agency executive: Nydia M. Cotto Vives, President
- Parent agency: Secretariat of Governance
- Key document: Act No. 2 of 1988

The Puerto Rico Office of the Special Independent Prosecutor's Panel (Spanish: Oficina del Panel sobre el Fiscal Especial Independiente) is an autonomous agency of the executive branch of the government of Puerto Rico that appoints Special Independent Prosecutors —Spanish: Fiscal Especial Independiente (FEI)— to investigate and prosecute government officials who engage in criminal conduct. FEIs are equivalent to special prosecutors while the agency is synonymous to the United States Department of Justice Office of Special Counsel but at the state government level rather than federal.
