= Secretary of Corrections and Rehabilitation of Puerto Rico =

Government of Puerto Rico

- Incumbent; Lcdo. Francisco Quiñones Rivera since January 9, 2025; 19 months ago
- Department of Corrections and Rehabilitation
- Nominator: Governor
- Appointer: Governor with advice and consent from the Senate
- Term length: 4 years
- Formation: Established by Article VI of the Constitution of Puerto Rico and Reorganization Plan No. 3 of 1993
- Salary: $100,000 USD
- Website: www.ac.gobierno.pr

The secretary of corrections and rehabilitation of Puerto Rico (Spanish: Secretario de Corrección y Rehabilitación de Puerto Rico) is responsible for structuring, developing, and coordinating the public policies of Puerto Rico over its correctional system and the rehabilitation of its adult and young population.

== Former secretaries ==
- Mercedes Otero (1985-1992)
- Zoraida Buxó Santiago (1993-1995)
- Nydia Cotto Vives (1995-1997)
- Zoé Laboy (1997-2000)
- Miguel Pereira Castillo (2003-2008)
- Carlos Molina Rodríguez (2009-2011)
- Jesús González (2011-2012)
- José Negrón Fernández (2013-2015)
- José Aponte Carro (2015)
- Ángel Negrón (2015)
- José U. Zayas Cintrón (2016)
- Ramón Torres Cruz (2016)
- Einar Ramos López (2016)
- Erik Y. Rolón Suárez (2016-2019)
- Eduardo Rivera Juanatey (2019-2020)
- Ana I. Escobar Pabón (2021–2024)
- Lcdo. Francisco Quiñones Rivera (2025–present)

== See also ==
- Crime in Puerto Rico
- Puerto Rico Police
