= Secretary of Transportation and Public Works of Puerto Rico =

Government of Puerto Rico

- Incumbent; Eileen Vélez Vega since January 2, 2021; 5 years ago
- Department of Transportation and Public Works
- Nominator: Governor Pedro R. Pierluisi Urrutia
- Appointer: Governor Pedro R. Pierluisi Urrutia with advice and consent from the Senate
- Term length: 4 years
- Formation: Established by Law No. 6 of 1952, Article IV of the Constitution of Puerto Rico, and Reorganization Plan No. 6 of 1971
- Succession: Sixth
- Website: www.dtop.pr.gov

The secretary of transportation and public works of Puerto Rico (Spanish: Secretario de Transportación y Obras Públicas de Puerto Rico) leads the Department of Transportation and Public Works of Puerto Rico and leads all efforts related to transportation and public works in Puerto Rico. As of 2021, the current secretary is Eileen Vélez Vega, the first woman to lead the Puerto Rico Department of Transportation and Public Works.
