= Inspector General of Puerto Rico =

Government of Puerto Rico

The Inspector General of Puerto Rico is the inspector general of the government of Puerto Rico and leads the Office of the Inspector General of the Government of Puerto Rico. The Inspector General of Puerto Rico is Ivelisse Torres Rivera.
