= Héctor Pesquera =

FBI official

Secretary of Public Safety of Puerto Rico
- In office April 10, 2017 – April 30, 2019
- Governor: Ricardo Rosselló
- Succeeded by: Elmer Román

Superintendent of the Puerto Rico Police
- In office April 9, 2012 – November 30, 2013
- Governor: Luis Fortuño; Alejandro García Padilla
- Preceded by: Emilio Díaz Colón
- Succeeded by: James Tuller

Commissioner of Safety and Public Protection
- In office April 9, 2012 – April 10, 2017
- Governor: Luis Fortuño; Alejandro García Padilla
- Preceded by: Emilio Díaz Colón

Assistant Director of Safety Affairs Port of Miami
- In office May 2008 – April 2012

Coordinator for Homeland Security Broward County Sheriff's Office
- In office December 2003 – May 2008

Special Agent in Charge FBI Miami Division
- In office February 1998 – December 2003

Special Agent in Charge FBI Puerto Rico Office
- In office December 1995 – February 1998

Special Agent FBI
- In office 1976–1995

Personal details
- Born: Héctor M. Pesquera; December 30, 1946 (age 79) Rio Piedras, Puerto Rico
- Education: University of Puerto Rico (BBA)
- Occupation: FBI agent
- Cabinet: 15th Cabinet of Puerto Rico; 16th Cabinet of Puerto Rico

Héctor Pesquera is a former Superintendent of the Puerto Rico Police and the Puerto Rico Commissioner of Safety and Public Protection. Graduated at Colegio San José High School. In 1968 he earned a bachelor's degree in business and financial administration from the University of Puerto Rico. On October 18, 1976, Pesquera was sworn in as Special Agent of the Federal Bureau of Investigation (FBI). Once he completed inicial training at the FBI Academy in Quantico, Virginia he was assigned to San Juan, Puerto Rico, where he worked in the organized crime, counterintelligence, and terrorism divisions. He was in charge of the SWAT program in San Juan during the 1979 Pan American Games. In July 1982, Pesquera was transferred to the Tampa, Florida field office, where he worked on terrorism and international counterintelligence matters. In November 1984, Héctor Pesquera was assigned to FBI's headquarters in Washington D.C. to be in charge of the Cuban affairs program and was also assigned other responsibilities with all the countries of Central and South America. Pesquera served for 27 years in the Federal Bureau of Investigation (FBI) until his retirement in 2003. He then served as Coordinator for the United States Department of Homeland Security at the Broward County Sheriff's Office from 2003 to 2008, and as Assistant Director of Safety Affairs of the Port of Miami from 2008 to 2012. In 2012, he was named chief of Puerto Rico's police. In an interview with NPR in early 2013, Pesquera stated that Puerto Rico needed more help from the United States in its war against criminals, stating the proverbial "out of sight, out of mind" as it related to how people on the mainland seemed to be out of touch with the issues on the Island. He resigned on November 30, 2013.
