= Secretary of Family Affairs of Puerto Rico =

Government of Puerto Rico

- Incumbent; Glorimar Andújar Matos since January 2, 2017; 9 years ago
- Department of Family Affairs
- Nominator: Governor
- Appointer: Governor with advice and consent from the Senate
- Term length: 4 years
- Formation: Established by Law No. 171 of 1968; Law No. 5 of 1993; Reorganization Plan No. 5 of 1995
- Website: www.familia.gobierno.pr (in Spanish)

The secretary of family affairs of Puerto Rico (Spanish: Secretaria de la Familia de Puerto Rico) leads the Department of Family Affairs of Puerto Rico and all efforts related to the sociology of the family and social work in Puerto Rico.

== List of secretaries of family affairs ==
- 2009–2012: Yanitsia Irizarry Méndez
- 2013–2016: Idalia Colón Rondón
- 2017–present: Glorimar Andújar Matos
