= Puerto Rico Commission on Safety and Public Protection =

Government agency

Agency overview
- Formed: December 9, 1993; 32 years ago
- Preceding agency: Puerto Rico Safety Council
- Dissolved: April 10, 2017
- Superseding agency: Puerto Rico Department of Public Safety
- Jurisdiction: Executive Branch
- Parent agency: Secretariat of Governance
- Child agencies: Criminal Justice College; Firefighters Corps; Government Board of the 9-1-1 System; National Guard; Puerto Rico Police; State Agency for Emergency and Disaster Management
- Key document: Reorganization Plan No. 2 of 1993 (PDF)

The Puerto Rico Commission on Safety and Public Protection (Spanish: Comisión de Seguridad y Protección Pública) is the government agency of the executive branch of the government of Puerto Rico that coordinates, manages, and oversees all the public safety agencies and related private organizations in Puerto Rico. The Commission is composed by the Adjutant General, the Fire Chief, the Police Superintendent, and the Director of the State Agency for Emergency and Disaster Management, with one of the aforementioned officers presiding it as the Commissioner of Safety and Public Protection.

== Background ==
In 1993, the Governor of Puerto Rico through an executive order created the Puerto Rico Safety Council to oversee all matters related to public safety within Puerto Rico. Since its creation the Council was considered highly effective; however, at that time the Council was led by the Governor and required his continued presence so that the Council could operate effectively. This had the consequence of subtracting time from the Governor to focus on other areas of public administration. Because of this, the government created the Commission on Safety and Public Protection with broad powers so that the Commission, rather than the Governor, could implement, manage, coordinate, and oversee all public policy related to public safety in Puerto Rico. On April 10, 2017, governor Ricardo Rosselló disbanded the agency by signing Law 20, Law of the Puerto Rico Department of Public Safety, which absorbed all agencies.

== Agencies ==
- Criminal Justice College
- Firefighters Corps
- Government Board of the 9-1-1 System
- National Guard
- Police
- State Agency for Emergency and Disaster Management
