= Puerto Rico Economic Development Bank =

Government-owned corporation of Puerto Rico

Bank overview
- Formed: July 24, 1985; 41 years ago
- Jurisdiction: executive branch
- Headquarters: Guaynabo, Puerto Rico
- Bank executive: Luis Alemañy, President
- Key document: Law No. 22 of 1985
- Website: www.bde.pr.gov

The Economic Development Bank for Puerto Rico —Spanish: Banco de Desarrollo Económico para Puerto Rico (BDE)— is a government-owned corporation of Puerto Rico that provides loans, loan guarantees, and funds to private organizations whose economic activities have the effect of replacing imports in Puerto Rico. The Bank was established by Law No. 22 of 1985.
