= Puerto Rico Commissioner of Safety and Public Protection =

Commissioner of Safety and Public Protection of Puerto Rico
- Commission on Safety and Public Protection
- Reports to: Chief of Staff
- Nominator: Governor of Puerto Rico
- Appointer: Governor of Puerto Rico with advice and consent from the Senate
- Term length: 4 years
- Inaugural holder: Pedro Toledo
- Formation: December 9, 1993; 32 years ago
- Abolished: April 10, 2017; 9 years ago
- Succession: Secretary of Public Safety, DSP

The Puerto Rico Commissioner of Safety and Public Protection (Spanish: Comisionado de Seguridad y Protección Pública) is the Cabinet-level officer of the executive branch of the government of Puerto Rico that leads the Commission on Safety and Public Protection and, as such, coordinates, manages, and oversees all the public safety agencies and related private organizations in Puerto Rico. The Commissioner is appointed by the Governor with the advice and consent from the Senate and can only be selected from those holding the position of Adjutant General, Fire Chief, Police Superintendent, or Director of the State Agency for Emergency and Disaster Management. The office was abolish with the creation of the Puerto Rico Department of Public Safety.

== Background ==
In 1993, the Governor of Puerto Rico through an executive order created the Puerto Rico Safety Council to oversee all matters related to public safety within Puerto Rico. Since its creation the Council was considered highly effective; however, at that time the Council was led by the Governor and required his continued presence so that the Council could operate effectively. This had the consequence of subtracting time from the Governor to focus on other areas of public administration. Because of this, the government created the Commission on Safety and Public Protection led by a Commissioner with broad powers so that he, rather than the Governor, could implement, manage, coordinate, and oversee all public policy related to public safety in Puerto Rico.

== Agencies overseen ==
- Criminal Justice College
- Firefighters Corps
- Government Board of the 9-1-1 System
- National Guard
- Police
- State Agency for Emergency and Disaster Management

== Former Commissioners ==
- 1993–2001: Pedro Toledo
- 2005–2009: Pedro Toledo
- 2012–2017: Héctor M. Pesquera
