= Fiscal agent =

A fiscal agent, fiscal sponsor, or financial agent is a proxy that manages fiscal matters on behalf of another party. A fiscal agent may assist in managing funds, reporting, and administration, including functions such as disbursing dividends and the redemption of bonds or coupons at maturity, has well as handling tax issues.

== Distinct uses of the term ==
The terms fiscal agent and fiscal sponsor are not fully synonymous and are used in different contexts. In U.S. public finance, a fiscal agent is an institution that performs financial and operational services on behalf of a government or issuer. For example, the United States Federal Reserve is the fiscal agent of the federal government of the United States. The Federal Reserve explains that, as fiscal agents, the Reserve Banks provide the U.S. Department of the Treasury with services related to federal debt and payments.

By contrast, in the nonprofit sector, a fiscal sponsor is typically a tax-exempt organization that provides fiduciary oversight, financial management, and administrative support to a charitable project that does not have its own exempt status. The National Council of Nonprofits describes fiscal sponsorship in these terms.
