= Office of the Inspector General of the Government of Puerto Rico =

Government body

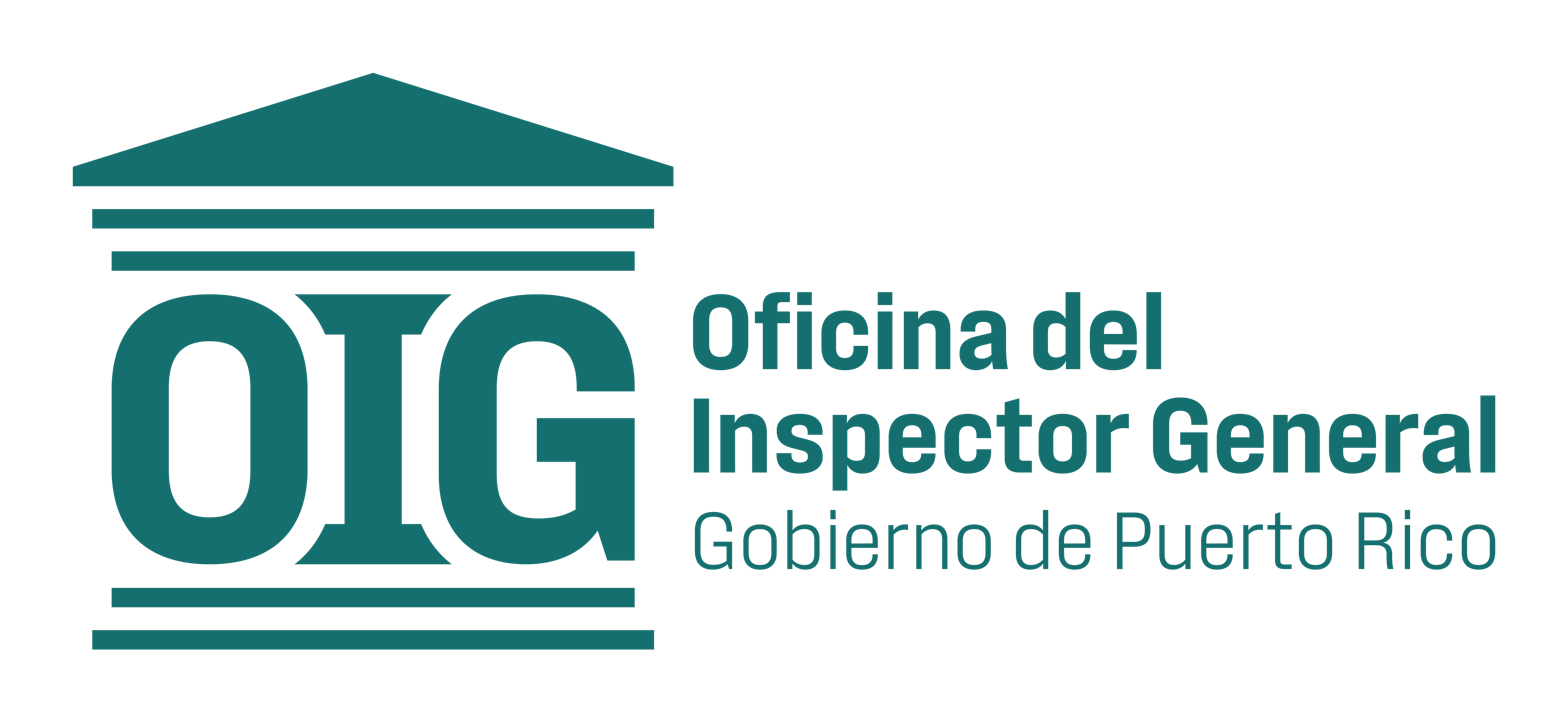

Agency overview
- Formed: 2017
- Type: Inspector general
- Jurisdiction: Executive branch of the government of Puerto Rico
- Headquarters: San Juan, Puerto Rico
- Agency executive: Ivelisse Torres Rivera, Inspector
- Key document: Law No. 15 of 2017
- Website: http://www.oig.pr.gov

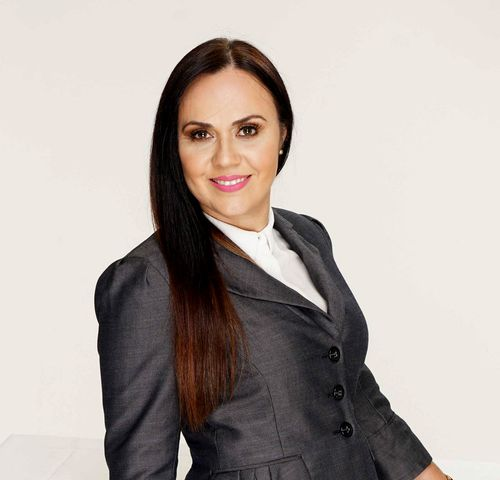
Inspectora General de Puerto Rico

== Creation ==
This office was created under law No. 15 of February 28, 2017, as amended (law No. 1 of January 3, 2018, Law No. 125 of July 10, 2018, Law No. 203 of August 5, 2018) with the purpose of strengthening the mechanisms of prevention, control, investigation and audit of government management; perform audits and consultancies in government entities aimed at achieving optimal levels of economy, efficiency and effectiveness of their administrative systems and risk management, control and direction; achieve, with a greater degree of possible security, reliable information; and encourage compliance with applicable laws, regulations and norms.

== Jurisdiction ==
According to Article 4 of Law No. 15-2017, as amended, the Office of the Inspector General will have access to information and documents related to the budget of all government entities. The OIG will not have jurisdiction over the Legislative and Judicial branches and will not be able to intervene with the following entities.

=== Excluded Entities ===
Entities
Center for the Collection of Municipal Taxes (CRIM)
Company for the Integral Development of the Peninsula de Cantera
Corporation of Proyecto Enlace del Caño Martín Peña
Environmental Protection Agency (EPA)
PR Government Ethics Office (OEG)
Office of Management and Budget (OGP)
Panel Office of the Independent Special Prosecutor (FEI)
Municipalities
University of Puerto Rico (UPR)
