= List of presidents of the Puerto Rico Planning Board =

The following is a list of the presidents of the Puerto Rico Planning Board since 1942. Most are either civil engineers or urban planners certified by the American Institute of Certified Planners.

PPD PNP
#	Portrait	Name	Date it took office	Date it left office	Party	Governor	Affiliation
1		Rafael Picó Santana	1942	1955			
2		Cándido Oliveras	1955	1960			
3		Ramón García Santiago	1960	1968			
4		Julio Vizcarrondo	1969	1969			
5		Enrique Soler Cloquell	1969	1972			
6		Rafael Alonso Alonso	1973	1976			
7		Miguel A. Rivera Ríos	1977	1983			
8		Nelson E. Soto Velázquez	1983	1984			
9		Patria G. Custodio	1985	1992			
10		Norma Burgos	1993	1998			
11		José R. Caballero Mercado	1998	2000			
12		Frederick Muhlach	2001	2001			
13		Hermenegildo Ortiz	2001	2002			
14		Ángel David Rodríguez	2002	2009	PPD	Aníbal Acevedo Vilá	
15		Héctor Morales Vargas	2009	2010	PNP	Luis Fortuño	Democrat
16		Rubén Flores Marzán	2010	presente	PNP	Luis Fortuño	Democrat
