= Puerto Rico Department of Family Affairs =

Government of Puerto Rico

- Departamento de Asuntos Familiares de Puerto Rico
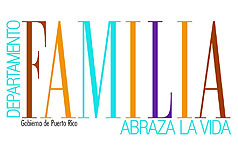

Department overview
- Formed: July 30, 1968; 58 years ago
- Jurisdiction: Executive branch
- Headquarters: San Juan, Puerto Rico
- Department executive: Orlando López Belmonte, Secretary
- Child agencies: ACUDEN; ADFAN; ADSEF; ASUME; CIRIO
- Key documents: Law No. 171 of 1968; Law No. 5 of 1993; Reorganization Plan No. 5 of 1995
- Website: www.familia.pr.gov

The Puerto Rico Department of Family Affairs (Spanish: Departamento de Asuntos Familiares de Puerto Rico) is responsible for all matters related to the sociology of the family and social work in the U.S. Commonwealth of Puerto Rico.

== Agencies ==
style="margin: 0 auto"

Name in English	Name in Spanish	Abbreviation in Spanish
Administration for Child Care and the Integrated Development of Childhood	Administración para el Cuidado y Desarrollo Integral de la Niñez	ACUDEN
Administration for Child Support	Administración para el Sustento de Menores	ASUME
Administration for Families and Children	Administración de Familias y Niños	ADFAN
Administration for the Socioeconomic Development of the Family	Administración para el Desarrollo Socioeconómico de la Familia	ADSEF
Corporation for Industries for the Blind, Mentally Retarded People, and Other Handicapped People	Corporación para las Industrias de Ciegos, Personas Mentalmente Retardadas y Otras Personas Incapacitadas	CIRIO

== Secretaries ==
The Puerto Rico Secretary of Family Affairs leads the Puerto Rico Department of Family Affairs and all efforts related to the sociology of the family and social work in the island.
