= Puerto Rico Environmental Quality Board =

Part of the executive branch of Puerto Rico

Department overview
- Formed: 1970
- Jurisdiction: Puerto Rico
- Headquarters: San Juan, PR
- Key document: Public Notice from EQB
- Website: www.jca.gobierno.pr

The Puerto Rico Environmental Quality Board —Spanish: Junta de Calidad Ambiental de Puerto Rico (JCA)— is the principal environmental protection regulator in Puerto Rico. The Board is attached to the Office of the Governor of Puerto Rico. Its 3 members and one alternate member are appointed by the Governor of Puerto Rico with the advice and consent of the Senate. The governor appoints one of its members as chairman of the board.

== History ==
The Board was established by Governor Luis A. Ferré in 1970, a year before the creation of the federal Environmental Protection Agency.

Its first chairman was Cruz A. Matos, under Governor Ferré. It has also been chaired by other prominent Puerto Ricans, including Pedro Gelabert, under Gov. Carlos Romero Barceló. Both Matos and Gelabert went on to serve as Secretary of the Puerto Rico Department of Natural and Environmental Resources, under Governors Rafael Hernández Colón and Pedro Rosselló, respectively. Laura Vélez Vélez headed the agency from 2013—2015 during Alejandro García Padilla's time as governor.
