= Puerto Rico Department of Housing =

Government of Puerto Rico

- Departamento de Vivienda de Puerto Rico
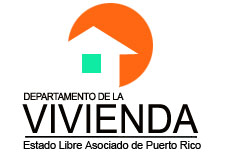

Department overview
- Formed: June 10, 1972; 54 years ago
- Jurisdiction: executive branch
- Headquarters: San Juan, PR
- Department executive: William Rodríguez Rodríguez, Secretary
- Key document: Law No. 97 of 1972
- Website: www.vivienda.pr.gov

The Puerto Rico Department of Housing (Spanish: Departamento de Vivienda de Puerto Rico) is the department responsible for homeownership, affordable housing, and community assistance programs in Puerto Rico. It was created in 1972.

== Programs ==
The agency is tasked with managing HUD funds including for housing under Section 8 (housing). The agency also administers Community Development Block Grants (CDBG-DR) used for building housing for those affected by natural disasters.

== Secretary ==
In 2021, governor Pedro Pierluisi designated William Rodríguez Rodríguez as the new secretary of the department.

== See also ==
Public housing in Puerto Rico
