= Puerto Rico Department of Natural and Environmental Resources =

Part of the executive branch of Puerto Rico

- Departamento de Recursos Naturales y Ambientales de Puerto Rico
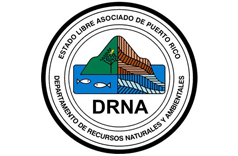

Department overview
- Formed: June 20, 1972; 54 years ago
- Preceding Department: Puerto Rico Department of Natural Resources
- Type: Executive department
- Jurisdiction: Puerto Rico
- Headquarters: San Juan, PR
- Employees: 1,096
- Department executive: Anaí Rodríguez (Interim), Secretary
- Child agencies: Natural Resources Administration; Solid Wastes Authority (ADS)
- Key documents: Law No. 23 of 1972; Reorganization Plan No. 4 of 1993
- Website: http://drna.pr.gov/

The Puerto Rico Department of Natural and Environmental Resources (PRDNER) (Spanish: Departamento de Recursos Naturales y Ambientales de Puerto Rico) is the executive department of the government of Puerto Rico tasked with protecting, conserving, developing, and managing the natural and environmental resources in Puerto Rico. As of April 2022 the current interim Secretary is Anaí Rodríguez after the resignation of Rafael A. Machargo. As of November 2020 the department has 1,096 employees.

== History ==
The Puerto Rico Department of Natural and Environmental Resources (DRNA) was created by Law Number 23 of June 20, 1972. The first head of the department was Cruz Matos.

In 2016 the agency's headquarters where temporarily moved from the Cruz A. Matos building in Cupey due to problems with the ventilation. Repairs would permit the agency to return to the building by 2021 after an investment of $1.7 million.

In 2018 governor Ricardo Rosselló signed senate project 859 into law which merged the Solid Wastes Authority, Board of Environmental Quality and Company of National Parks of Puerto Rico into the department.

In 2019 secretary Tania Vázquez Rivera resigned after a federal investigation was launched into irregularities within the department. In February 2020 governor Wanda Vázquez Garced nominated Rafael Machargo as the new secretary of the department.

During a Senate hearing in August 2021 secretary Rafael Machargo confirmed the agency did not have a plan for solid waste on the island. As of 2021 the department also lacks engineers and other staff necessary to manage the pumping stations in various municipalities.

=== 2021 Sol y Playa Condominium controversy ===
In the aftermath of Hurricane Maria the DRNA had authorized an emergency reconstruction permit for the cement fence around the pool area, part of the "Sun and Beach" condominium in Los Almendros beach in Rincón. In 2021 the owners of the property gained another permit to rebuild the fence in the area with plans to construct a larger pool and recreation area. On June 2, 2021, environmentalists began protesting the construction due to the environmental impact it would have on coastal erosion, turtle nesting, and because of laws which protect the island's coastal areas, labelling them as part of public property. On July 2 a Hawksbill sea turtle began nesting inside the construction site which resulted in the department ordering the construction be paralyzed. The turtle returned on two other occasions to continue nesting. In the following weeks lawyers of the agency noted the construction had continued even with the cease and desist order. As a result, the dispute escalated with 200 people protesting on July 24. A group protested outside the DRNA headquarters asking for secretary Rafael Machargo to resign on July 7. On August 4 the Puerto Rico Planning Board unanimously ordered the construction be halted after determining the permits granted where illegal. The board of the condominium insisted the construction was legal and that they were unjustly targeted. The board appealed the decision but a judge ruled against them indicating they must remove all the construction.

=== 2022 ===
In March 2022 governor Pedro Pierluisi announced the agency would receive $4 million to restart the training academy enabling the DRNA to hire new personnel for the agency.

== Agencies ==
- Natural Resources Administration
- Board of Environmental Quality
- Natural Resources Ranger Corps
- Solid Wastes Authority
- Company of National Parks of Puerto Rico- administers state parks including the Dr. Juan A. Rivero Zoo
