= Puerto Rico Planning Board =

Government of Puerto Rico

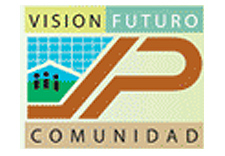

Board overview
- Formed: June 24, 1975; 51 years ago
- Jurisdiction: executive branch
- Headquarters: San Juan, Puerto Rico
- Board executive: Rubén Flores Marzán, President
- Parent Board: Office of the Governor
- Key document: Law No. 75 of 1975
- Website: www.jp.pr.gov

The Puerto Rico Planning Board (Spanish: Junta de Planificación) created in the May 12, 1942 during Rexford G. Tugwell's governorship as the Puerto Rico Planning, Urbanization, and Zoning Board, is the only government agency in charge of centralized planning under the American flag. Its creation was in keeping with Tugwell's New Deal philosophy that Puerto Rico should operate under a highly centralized, all-encompassing territorial government.

For decades, the Planning Board was in charge of all economic planning, land use zoning and case-by-case permitting in Puerto Rico. In the 1970s the permitting process was delegated to another government agency, the Rules and Permits Administration (ARPE) and since the late 1990s, major cities have been taking over that role in their own jurisdictions.

== Organization ==
The Planning Board currently has a Chair and four Associate Members, all appointed by the Governor and requiring the consent of the Puerto Rico Senate.

== Presidents ==
The following is a list of the men and women that have served as Presidents of the Planning Board since 1942. Most are either civil engineers or urban planners certified by the American Institute of Certified Planners.

- 1942–1955: Rafael Picó Santana
- 1955–1960: Cándido Oliveras
- 1960–1968: Ramón García Santiago
- 1969–1969: Julio Vizcarrondo
- 1969–1972: Enrique Soler Cloquell
- 1973–1976: Rafael Alonso Alonso
- 1977–1983: Miguel A. Rivera Ríos
- 1983–1984: Nelson E. Soto Velázquez
- 1985–1992: Patria G. Custodio
- 1993–1998: Norma Burgos
- 1998–2000: José R. Caballero Mercado
- 2001–2001: Frederick Muhlach
- 2001–2002: Hermenegildo Ortiz
- 2002–2009: Angel David Rodriguez
- 2009–2010: Héctor Morales Vargas
- 2010–2012: Rubén Flores Marzán
- 2013–2016: Luis García Pelatti
- 2017–2021: María del Carmen Gordillo Pérez
- 2021- at present: Manuel A.G. Hidalgo
