= Constitution of Puerto Rico =

Constitution of the commonwealth and unincorporated U.S. territory

Constitution of the Commonwealth of Puerto Rico
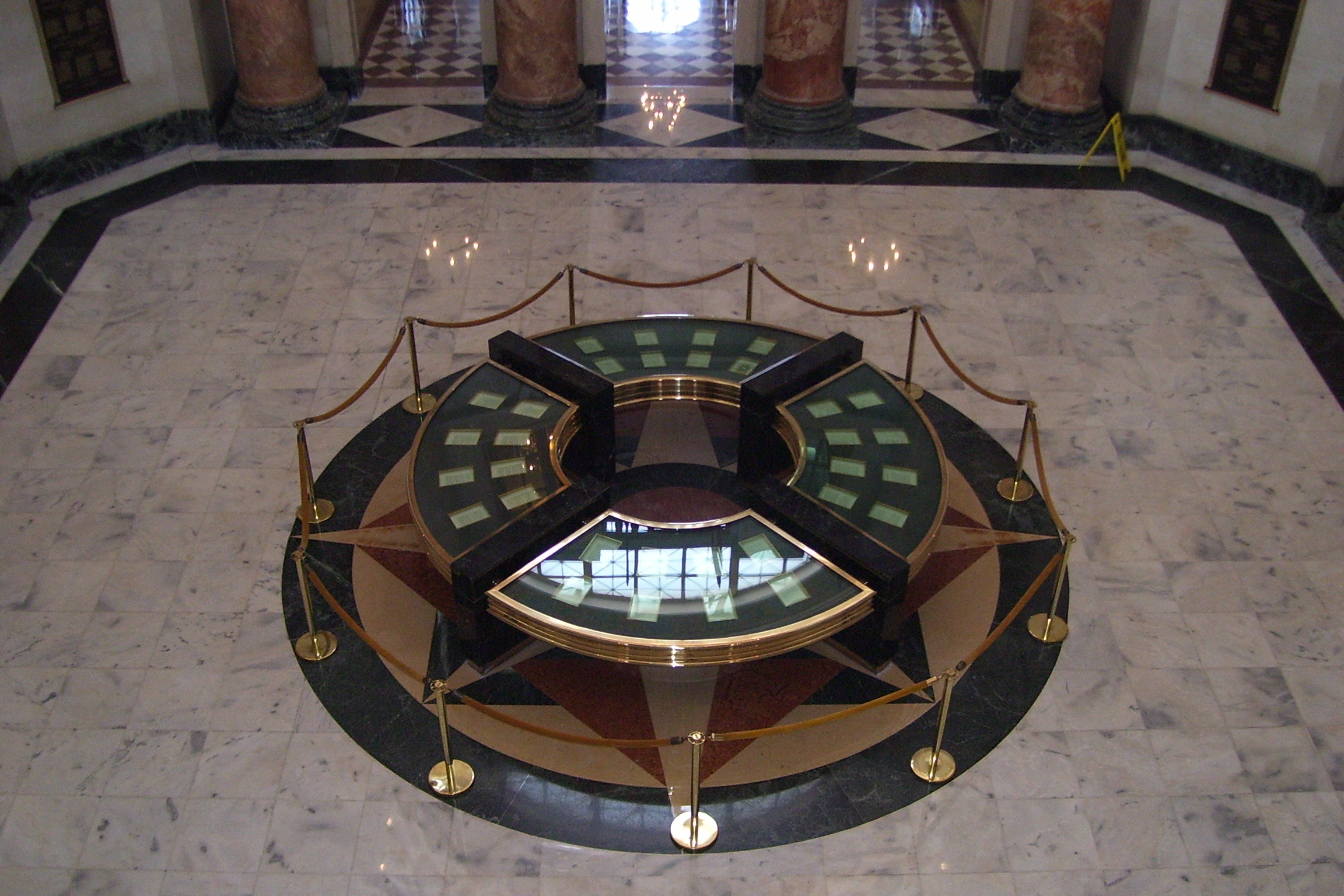
- Exhibition of the Constitution at the rotunda of the Capitol of Puerto Rico
- Original title: Constitución del Estado Libre Asociado de Puerto Rico
- Ratified: July 25, 1952; 74 years ago
- Location: Capitol of Puerto Rico, San Juan, Puerto Rico
- Author: 92 delegates from three parties
- Purpose: Create a commonwealth in union with the United States

Full text
- Constitution of the Commonwealth of Puerto Rico at Wikisource

The Constitution of the Commonwealth of Puerto Rico (Spanish: Constitución del Estado Libre Asociado de Puerto Rico, lit. 'Constitution of the Free Associated State of Puerto Rico') is the primary organizing law for the unincorporated U.S. territory of Puerto Rico, describing the duties, powers, structures, and functions of the local government of Puerto Rico and its relation with the U.S. in nine articles. Established under the Puerto Rico Federal Relations Act of 1950, it was approved by the residents of the archipelago and island in a constitutional referendum on March 3, 1952, ratified by the U.S. Congress as per Pub. L. 82–447 on July 3, 1952, and proclaimed into effect by Governor Luis Muñoz Marín on July 25, 1952, which is celebrated as Constitution Day. As the constitution of a U.S. territory, it is bound by the U.S. Constitution.

The Constitution of Puerto Rico established the Commonwealth of Puerto Rico, which succeeded the insular government that operated under two organic acts: the Foraker Act from 1900 to 1917 and the Jones–Shafroth Act from 1917 to 1952. With the ratification of the constitution in 1952, the full authority and responsibility for the local government of Puerto Rico was vested in the residents of Puerto Rico, resulting in complete self-governance within the archipelago and island.

Like state constitutions, the territorial Constitution of Puerto Rico is modeled after the federal U.S. Constitution. It outlines the structure of the local government, establishing a bill of rights, an executive branch directed by a governor, a legislature composed of a legislative assembly, and judiciary headed by a supreme court. However, unlike state constitutions, the Puerto Rican constitution can be repealed or amended by the U.S. Congress, which preserves ultimate authority over the self-governing rights of Puerto Rico, as per the Territorial Clause in Article IV of the U.S. Constitution.

Under the constitution, Puerto Rico is neither a sovereign state nor a U.S. state, but a self-governing U.S. unincorporated territory subject to the constitutional and territorial sovereignty of the U.S. federal government. Specifically, the U.S. Congress has plenary authority or unlimited power over the archipelago and island through the Territorial Clause in Article IV of the U.S. Constitution. As such, Puerto Rico operates as an administrative division and dependent territory belonging to, but not part of, the U.S., which is composed of the 50 states and the federal District of Columbia. The political status of Puerto Rico is an ongoing debate.

== History ==
The United States federal government authorized Puerto Rico to draft its own constitution with the enactment of the Puerto Rico Federal Relations Act of 1950. The Constitutional Assembly met for a period of several months between 1951 and 1952 in which the document was written. The law required the framers to follow only two basic requirements: a republican form of government and inclusion of a Bill of Rights.

The proposed constitution was approved overwhelmingly by nearly 82% of the voters in a popular referendum on March 3, 1952. The United States Congress and the President approved it, but required that the Article II (Bill of Rights), Section 20 (guaranteeing the right to education and various economic rights it recognized as human rights) be stricken and that language be added to Section 5 of Article II allowing non-governmental schools. On July 10, 1952, the Constitutional Convention of Puerto Rico reconvened and approved a resolution accepting those conditions, which were later ratified in a referendum held in November 1952, by the electorate. On July 25, 1952, Governor Luis Muñoz Marín proclaimed that the constitution was in effect. In a speech on July 25, 2013, Governor Alejandro García Padilla, despite the conditions established by Congress, proclaimed that, henceforth, Sec. 20 would be deemed by his administration to be in effect.

In 1960, 1961, 1964 and 1970 voters approved amendments to the constitution in various referendums.

A continuing debate has dealt with the legal status of Puerto Rico under the Federal Government of the United States. Certain decisions by the Supreme Court of the United States appeared to have interpreted the Territorial Clause of the United States Constitution as still controlling over Puerto Rico. Under this clause, the United States Congress is the recognized sovereign of the island.

In 1976, the U.S. Supreme Court clarified that the purpose of Congress in the 1950 and 1952 legislation was to accord to Puerto Rico the degree of autonomy and independence normally associated with a State of the Union. However, on June 9, 2016, as an outcome of the case known as Puerto Rico v. Sanchez Valle, the U.S. Supreme Court incited a debate regarding the nature of the relationship established by the 1950 and 1952 legislation, allegedly breaching the compact between the United States and the People of Puerto Rico. The debate was fueled when the Supreme Court decided that the Double Jeopardy Clause bars Puerto Rico and the United States from successively prosecuting a single person for the same conduct under equivalent criminal laws. The Supreme Court ruling stated that, at least in the cases related to criminal offenses, sovereignty of Puerto Rico ultimately resides in the United States Congress. The argument made by the U.S. Supreme Court was interpreted by many as an affirmation of a severely diminished capacity of the constitutional stature that the Puerto Rican government had. This was the same idea of stature that the Puerto Rican government has had for nearly seven decades. Justice Elena Kagan stated that the ruling in the case of 'Puerto Rico v. Sanchez Valle' was confined solely to the corresponding issue of double jeopardy within a criminal case, not to the whole of Puerto Rico's political status. Still, the outcome fueled a debate regarding the current nature of the political relationship established between Puerto Rico and United States of America.

=== Proposed amendments ===
In 1994 and 2012 constitutional amendments were proposed but these were unsuccessful. In 2021 the PPD majority led by Tatito Hernández began a discussion over amending the constitution. The speaker of the House of Representatives proposed increasing the governor's salary, replacing at large representatives by district elections and reducing the number of representatives from 51 to 45. Governor Pedro Pierluisi has favored term limits for legislators but has expressed opposition to proposals for the creation of a recall referendum.

== Founding fathers ==
Twelve weeks after the people of Puerto Rico approved to write their own constitution in a referendum, 92 individuals were elected as delegates to a constitutional assembly on August 27, 1951. Of these, 70 belonged to the Popular Democratic Party (PPD), 15 belonged to the Republican Statehood Party, while 7 belonged to the Puerto Rican Socialist Party. Members from the Puerto Rican Independence Party (PIP) abstained from participating. The following is a list of the delegates:

- Antonio Fernós Isern
- Augusto Valentín
- Celestino Iriarte
- Ernesto Ramos Antonini
- Fernando J. Géigel
- Francisco Anselmi
- Heraclio Rivera Colón
- Lino Padrón Rivera
- Luis A. Ferré
- Miguel A. García Méndez
- Juan R. Garcia Delgado
- Luis Muñoz Marín
- Luis Negrón López
- Mario Canales
- Ramón Barreto Pérez
- Roberto Sánchez Vilella
- Roberto H. Todd
- Rubén Gaztambide Arrillaga
- Ubaldino Ramírez de Arellano

The delegates, which would eventually become the founding fathers of the current commonwealth of Puerto Rico, established 10 permanent committees: 7 which dealt with constitutional matters and 3 which dealt with the assembly's internal operations. The constitutional committees were as follows:

- Committee on the Preamble, Ordinances, and Amendment Procedures
- Committee on the Bill of Rights
- Committee on the Legislative Branch
- Committee on the Executive Branch
- Committee on the Judicial Branch
- Committee on the Transitional Provisions of the General Affairs
- Committee on the Editorial, Style, and Enrollment

The assembly held 62 sessions between September 17, 1951, and February 6, 1952, approving the constitution within the assembly two days before concluding their affairs on February 4, 1952. The constitution was then overwhelmingly approved a month later by the people of Puerto Rico in a referendum held on March 3, 1952.

== Preamble ==
The Preamble reads:

We, the people of Puerto Rico, in order to organize ourselves politically on a fully democratic basis, to promote the general welfare, and to secure for ourselves and our posterity the complete enjoyment of human rights, placing our trust in Almighty God, do ordain and establish this Constitution for the commonwealth which, in the exercise of our natural rights, we now create within our union with the United States of America.

In so doing, we declare:

The democratic system is fundamental to the life of the Puerto Rican community;

We understand that the democratic system of government is one in which the will of the people is the source of public power, the political order is subordinate to the rights of man, and the free participation of the citizen in collective decisions is assured;

We consider as determining factors in our life our citizenship of the United States of America and our aspiration continually to enrich our democratic heritage in the individual and collective enjoyment of its rights and privileges; our loyalty to the principles of the Federal Constitution; the co-existence in Puerto Rico of the two great cultures of the American Hemisphere; our fervor for education; our faith in justice; our devotion to the courageous, industrious, and peaceful way of life; our fidelity to individual human values above and beyond social position, racial differences, and economic interests; and our hope for a better world based on these principles.

The Preamble of the Constitution of Puerto Rico is more extensive than the Preamble to the United States Constitution. However, it has the similarity that the preamble neither grants any powers nor inhibits any actions; it only explains the rationale behind the Constitution. Yet, it specifically details the determining factors that the Puerto Rican people have chosen as the basis for their new government. It also establishes the Constitution's loyalty to the principles of the Federal Constitution.

== Articles of the Constitution ==
The remainder of the document consists of nine articles:

=== Article One: The Commonwealth ===
Article One establishes the new government for the unincorporated territory, which shall bear the name of Commonwealth of Puerto Rico. It declares that the source of the power of the government emanates from the people. The following three sections of the Article establish the Republican form of government of the unincorporated territory, divided into three branches (legislative, executive and judicial) and specifies the territorial jurisdiction of the document as well as the seat of the new government, which shall be the city of San Juan.

=== Article Two: Bill of Rights ===
Article Two of the Constitution of Puerto Rico—titled as the Bill of Rights (Spanish: Carta de Derecho)— lists the most important rights held by the citizens of Puerto Rico. The Bill of Rights was mandated by Pub. L. 81–600 which provided for the people of Puerto Rico to adopt a constitution of their own which had to include a bill of rights.

The bill enumerates several freedoms, namely freedom of assembly, freedom of the press, freedom of religion, freedom of speech, freedom from unreasonable search and seizure, security in personal effects, and freedom from warrants issued without probable cause. It also establishes two fundamental declarations, that "the dignity of the human being is inviolable" and that all men are equal before the law. It also prohibits several discriminations, namely discrimination made on account of race, color, sex, birth, social origin or condition, or political or religious ideas. The bill even took a step further by declaring such principles as essential to human equality.

The Bill of Rights also establishes explicitly that there shall be complete separation of church and state, and that Puerto Rico must have a system of free and secular public education. It also establishes the right to vote, the right to life, and the right to liberty.

There are a number of variations that make the Puerto Rico Bill of Rights distinct from that of the Federal Bill of Rights. For instance in Puerto Rico they do not have the right to trial by jury but they do have direct protections against wiretapping.

In order to comply with the requirements of Public Law 600, the framers of the Constitution of Puerto Rico decided to draft an extensive list of rights which were then organized into a whole Article of the constitutional document. It is divided into nineteen sections, each one listing one or several rights which are deemed fundamental under Puerto Rican constitutional law.

Section One begins by establishing that 'the dignity of the human being is inviolable' and that 'all men are equal before the law.'. These two sentences have traditionally been interpreted by scholars as granting an unlimited number of rights, since anything that violates the dignity of a human being will be deemed unconstitutional. However, the remainder of the section concretely establishes the kinds of discriminations that are outlawed.

No discrimination shall be made on account of race, color, sex, birth, social origin or condition, or political or religious ideas. Both the laws and the system of public education shall embody these principles of essential human equality.

Section Two establishes the right to vote in Puerto Rico;

Section 2. The laws shall guarantee the expression of the will of the people by means of equal, direct and secret universal suffrage and shall protect the citizen against any coercion in the exercise of the electoral franchise.

Section Three is the religious clause of the Constitution of Puerto Rico. It prohibits the establishment of religion and protects the free exercise of religion. It reads;

No law shall be made respecting an establishment of religion or prohibiting the free exercise thereof. There shall be complete separation of church and state.

The last sentence specifically and concretely establishes the separation of church and state, a clause that is not found in the United States' Constitution but, rather, it is assumed and interpreted to exist. Section three leaves no doubt about the existence of such separation in Puerto Rico.

Section Four is very similar to the First Amendment to the United States Constitution. It establishes the freedom of speech, freedom of the press, freedom of assembly and the right to petition. It reads;

No law shall be made abridging the freedom of speech or of the press, or the right of the people peaceably to assemble and to petition the government for a redress of grievances.

Section Five establishes the right to an education. It also mandates the establishment of a non-sectarian and free educational system for the commonwealth. The section also establishes that education will be compulsory for elementary school, to the extent permitted by the facilities of the state. The section further establishes that no public property or public funds shall be used for the support of schools or educational institutions other than those of the state.

Section Six declares the right of the people to organize themselves in associations, except if the associations are military or quasi-military in nature.

Section Seven contain several important fundamental rights. It reads;

The right to life, liberty and the enjoyment of property is recognized as a fundamental right of man. The death penalty shall not exist. No person shall be deprived of his liberty or property without due process of law. No person in Puerto Rico shall be denied the equal protection of the laws. No laws impairing the obligation of contracts shall be enacted. A minimum amount of property and possessions shall be exempt from attachment as provided by law.

First, Section Seven establishes that the right to life is fundamental in Puerto Rico. Because of this, the section determines that the death penalty will not exist under the jurisdiction of the commonwealth.

Second, the section contains the due process of law as well as the equal protection clauses. Third, it includes a contract clause for the jurisdiction of the commonwealth. Finally, the sections guarantees that a minimum amount of the property owned by individuals will be exempt from government possession.

Section Eight declares that every person has the right to be protected by law against attacks on their honor, reputation and private or family life. This section has been interpreted as creating a general right to privacy in Puerto Rico.

Section Nine creates more liberties for the press. It establishes that:

No law shall be enacted authorizing condemnation of printing presses, machinery or material devoted to publications of any kind. The buildings in which these objects are located may be condemned only after a judicial finding of public convenience and necessity pursuant to procedure that shall be provided by law, and may be taken before such a judicial finding only when there is placed at the disposition of the publication an adequate site in which it can be installed and continue to operate for a reasonable time.

Section Ten is similar to the Fourth Amendment to the United States Constitution. It establishes that persons shall be protected against "unreasonable searches and seizures". It explicitly prohibits the use of wire-tapping. Furthermore, it declares that no search warrant shall be issued unless probable cause is shown.

Section Eleven is primarily devoted to the rights of the accused.

In all criminal prosecutions, the accused shall enjoy the right to have a speedy and public trial, to be informed of the nature and cause of the accusation and to have a copy thereof, to be confronted with the witnesses against him, to have assistance of counsel, and to be presumed innocent.

It also establishes that in all trials of felony the accused shall enjoy of a jury of twelve peers who render a verdict by majority vote in which no less than nine shall concur. Also, the section creates the right against self-incrimination as well as the prohibition of double jeopardy.

Section Twelve outlaws slavery and involuntary servitude, unless duly convicted. It also prohibits ex post facto laws and bills of attainder.

Section Thirteen guarantees the writ of habeas corpus, which can only be suspended by the Legislative Assembly in time of "rebellion, insurrection or invasion."

Section Fourteen prohibits the use of titles of nobility. It also prohibits public officials to receive gifts from foreign powers without the approval of the Legislative Assembly.

Section Fifteen deals with child labor. It prohibits the employment of children of less than fourteen years on jobs that may be "prejudicial to their health or morals". It also guarantees that no children under the age of sixteen shall be kept in jail.

Section Seventeen creates the fundamental right of employees, private and public, to organize themselves into associations and to negotiate with their employers. Section Eighteen also declares a fundamental right for employers to go on strike. However, the section ends by stating; "Nothing herein contained shall impair the authority of the Legislative Assembly to enact laws to deal with grave emergencies that clearly imperil the public health or safety or essential public services."

Section Nineteen is similar to the Ninth Amendment to the United States Constitution. It reads;

The foregoing enumeration of rights shall not be construed restrictively nor does it contemplate the exclusion of other rights not specifically mentioned which belong to the people in a democracy. The power of the Legislative Assembly to enact laws for the protection of the life, health and general welfare of the people shall likewise not be construed restrictively.

This section stresses out that the civil rights and liberties outlined in this Bill of Rights do not constitute an exclusive list thereof; others may exist. In other words, just because a civil right is not listed here, does not mean that the people do not have it. This is a safeguard against strict literal interpretations of the constitution with which the people will be denied all the rights not specifically listed here, such as a right to travel between districts at their own leisure (see propiska), or the right to travel abroad.

=== Article Three: Legislative power ===
The article establishes that the territorial legislature must be bicameral, and composed by the Senate as the upper house and the House of Representatives as the lower house. It also established the composition of each house, and that Puerto Rico must be divided into senatorial and representative districts for the purpose of elections.

The article also established a board that must revise the districts after each decennial census so that they remain practicable, and divided upon the basis of population and means of communication. It also established how the number of members of each house must increase when a political party obtains more than two thirds of the seats in one or both houses. This was done in order to reduce the likelihood of one party having absolute control over constitutional amendments, as these require at least two thirds of the vote of each house in order to be enacted.

Article Four was also very loose regarding the rules overseeing each house, establishing that each house must be the sole judge of the election, returns and qualifications of its members, that each house must choose its own officers, and that each house must adopt rules for its own proceedings appropriate to legislative bodies. This, in essence, gives broad powers to each house on how to structure itself and which procedures it must follow. It, however, established the posts of President of the Senate and Speaker of the House without any other specifics besides the title of the posts although interpretatively the article meant them to be the presiding officers of their respective house.

The article also established that the sessions of each house must be open, what constitutes quorum, and where should they meet, namely in the Capitol of Puerto Rico. It also granted parliamentary immunity to its members.

Article Four also established the parliamentary procedure to enact bills, namely that they must be printed, read, referred to a commission and returned therefrom with a written report, approved by the majority of which each house is composed, and signed by the governor in order to become law. The article also established the exclusive powers of each house, as well as establishing the post of Comptroller.

=== Article Four: Executive Power ===
Article Four describes the powers, structure, functions, responsibilities, and legal scope of the Governor of Puerto Rico, the executive branch of the government of Puerto Rico. The article establishes the term length of the governor and the requirements to hold such post, as well as establishing the governor as commander-in-chief of the militia, namely the Puerto Rico National Guard. It also establishes that the governor must present a State of the State address to the Legislative Assembly each year, as well as a report on the Budget of the Government of Puerto Rico.

The article also establishes the Council of Secretaries, and that all secretaries must be appointed with the advice and consent from the Senate of Puerto Rico, except for the Secretary of State which requires the advice and consent of the House of Representatives as well.

Article Four also established several executive departments, namely the departments of Agriculture and Commerce, Education, Health, Justice, Labor, State, Public Works, and Treasury. The Department of Agriculture and Commerce was later renamed to the Department of Agriculture, while several decades later the Department of Commerce and Economic Development was created by extraconstitutional law.

The article also established the first steps towards the Puerto Rico governmental line of succession, establishing the Secretary of State as first in line of succession.

=== Article Five: Judicial Power ===
Article Five describes the powers, structure, functions, responsibilities, and legal scope of the Supreme Court of Puerto Rico, the judicial branch of the government of Puerto Rico. The article also establishes that the Supreme Court must be the court of last resort, and that it must be composed by a Chief Justice and several Associate Justices. It also establishes that judges must be appointed by the Governor of Puerto Rico with the advice and consent from the Senate of Puerto Rico.

=== Article Six: General Provisions ===
Article Six authorizes the Legislative Assembly to create, abolish, consolidate and reorganize municipalities; to change their territorial limits; to determine their organization and functions; and to authorize them to develop programs for the general welfare and to create any agencies necessary for that purpose. It also authorizes the Commonwealth of Puerto Rico to impose and collect taxes and to authorize their imposition and collection by municipalities, as determined by the Legislative Assembly.

=== Article Seven: Amendments to the Constitution ===
Article 7 established the rules to perform amendments to the constitution, the Legislative Assembly may propose amendments to this Constitution by a concurrent resolution approved by not less than two-thirds of the total number of members of which each house is composed. All proposed amendments shall be submitted to the qualified electors in a special referendum, but if the concurrent resolution is approved by not less than three-fourths of the total number of members of which each house is composed, the Legislative Assembly may provide that the referendum shall be held at the same time as the next general election. Each proposed amendment shall be voted on separately and not more than three proposed amendments may be submitted at the same referendum. Every proposed amendment shall specify the terms under which it shall take effect, and it shall become a part of this Constitution if it is ratified by a majority of the electors voting thereon.

The section 3 indicates that no amendment to this Constitution shall alter the republican form of government established by it or abolish its bill of rights.*

- By Resolution number 34, approved by the Constitutional Convention and ratified in the Referendum held on November 4, 1952, the following new sentence was added to section 3 of article VII: "Any amendment or revision of this constitution shall be consistent with the resolution enacted by the applicable provisions of the Constitution of the United States, with the Puerto Rican Federal Relations Act and with Public Law 600, Eighty-first Congress, adopted in the nature of a compact".

== See also ==
- Balzac v. Porto Rico
- Federal tribunals in the United States
- Law of Puerto Rico
- Political status of Puerto Rico
- Privileges and Immunities Clause
- Proposed political status for Puerto Rico
- Puerto Rican citizenship
- Sovereigntism (Puerto Rico)
- Special Committee on Decolonization
- United Nations list of non-self-governing territories
- United States territorial court
- Territories of the United States
