= Puerto Rico Department of State =

Government of Puerto Rico

Coordinates: 18°27′56″N 66°7′3″W

Department of State of Puerto Rico
- Departamento de Estado de Puerto Rico (Spanish)
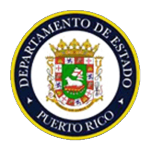

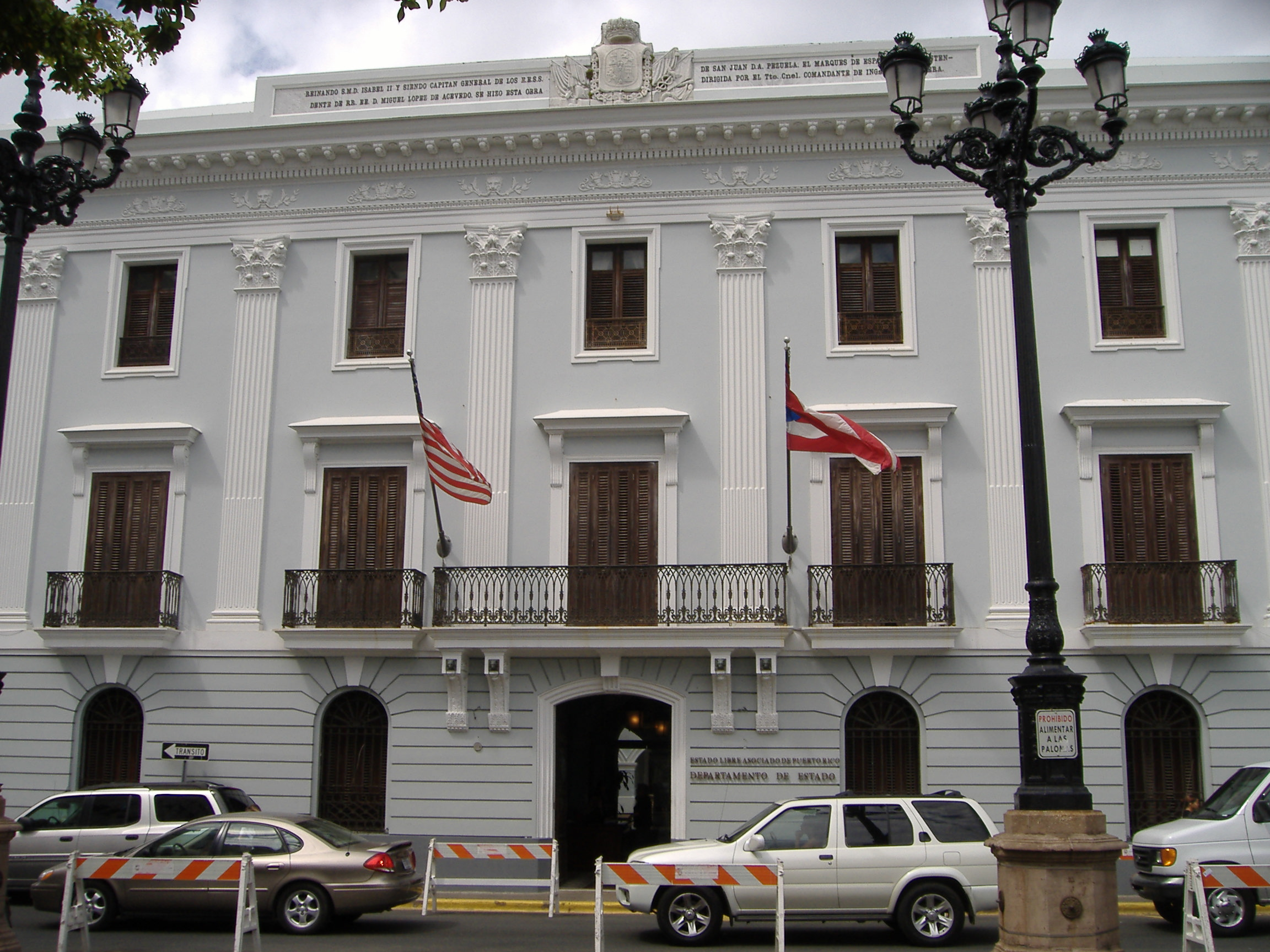
- Palacio de la Real Intendencia serving as the main offices

Agency overview
- Formed: July 25, 1952; 74 years ago
- Type: Executive department
- Jurisdiction: Executive branch of the government of Puerto Rico
- Headquarters: San Juan, Puerto Rico
- Agency executive: Rosachely Rivera, Secretary of State
- Child agencies: Bureau for Cultural Exchange and Technical Cooperation; Intellectual Property Office; Office of Protocol, International, and Interstate Relations; Passport Acceptance Office; Trademark Office
- Key document: Constitution of Puerto Rico
- Website: www.estado.pr.gov

The Department of State of Puerto Rico (Spanish: Departamento de Estado de Puerto Rico) was created in July 1952 and is responsible of promoting the cultural, political, and economical relations between Puerto Rico, other jurisdictions of the United States and foreign countries.

== History ==
The Department of State of Puerto Rico was established by section 6 of Article IV of the constitution passed on July 25, 1952.

The Department headquarters is located in the Old Palace of the Royal Intendency (Antiguo Palacio de la Real Intendencia) in Old San Juan with regional offices in Arecibo, Fajardo and Ponce.

== Secretaries ==
- 1952–1964: Roberto Sánchez Vilella
- 1965–1966: Carlos J. Lastra
- 1966–1969: Guillermo Irizarry
- 1969–1973: Carlos Fernando Chardón
- 1973–1974: Victor Pons
- 1975–1977: Juan A. Albors
- 1977–1979: Reinaldo Paniagua Diez
- 1979–1981: Pedro R. Vazquez
- 1981–1985: Carlos S. Quirós
- 1985–1988: Héctor Luis Acevedo
- 1988–1988: Alfonso Lopez Char
- 1988–1990: Sila M. Calderon
- 1990–1992: Antonio J. Colorado
- 1992–1992: Salvador M. Padilla Escabi
- 1993–1995: Baltasar Corrada del Rio
- 1995–1999: Norma Burgos
- 1999–2001: Angel Morey
- 2001–2003: Ferdinand Mercado
- 2004–2004: Jose Izquierdo Encarnacion
- 2005–2005: Marisara Pont Marchese
- 2005–2009: Fernando J. Bonilla
- 2009–2013: Kenneth D. McClintock
- 2013–2015: David Bernier
- 2015–2016: Víctor Suárez Meléndez
- 2017–2019: Luis G. Rivera Marín
- 2019: Pedro Pierluisi (acting)
- 2019–2020: Elmer L. Román González
- 2020–2021: Raúl Márquez Hernández
- 2021: Larry Rodríguez
- 2021–2025: Omar Marrero
- 2025–present: Rosachely Rivera

== See also ==
- List of company registers#District/Territorial registries (Puerto Rico Trademark Office)
