= List of foreign ministers in 2005 =

This is a list of foreign ministers in 2005.

== Africa ==
- Algeria -
  1. Abdelaziz Belkhadem (2000-2005)
  2. Mohammed Bedjaoui (2005-2007)
- Angola - João Bernardo de Miranda (1999-2008)
- Benin - Rogatien Biaou (2003-2006)
- Botswana - Mompati Merafhe (1994-2008)
- Burkina Faso - Youssouf Ouédraogo (1999-2007)
- Burundi -
  1. Terence Sinunguruza (2001-2005)
  2. Antoinette Batumubwira (2005-2009)
- Cameroon - Laurent Esso (2004-2006)
- Cape Verde - Víctor Borges (2004-2008)
- Central African Republic -
  1. Charles Wénézoui (2003-2005)
  2. Jean-Paul Ngoupandé (2005-2006)
- Chad -
  1. Nagoum Yamassoum (2003-2005)
  2. Ahmad Allam-Mi (2005-2008)
- Comoros -
  1. Mohamed El-Amine Souef (2002-2005)
  2. Aboudou Soefou (2005-2006)
- Republic of Congo - Rodolphe Adada (1997-2007)
- Democratic Republic of Congo - Raymond Ramazani Baya (2004-2007)
- Côte d'Ivoire - Bamba Mamadou (2003-2006)
- Djibouti -
  1. Ali Abdi Farah (1999-2005)
  2. Mahamoud Ali Youssouf (2005–present)
- Egypt - Ahmed Aboul Gheit (2004-2011)
- Equatorial Guinea - Pastor Micha Ondó Bile (2003-2012)
- Eritrea -
  1. Ali Said Abdella (2000-2005)
  2. Mohamed Omer (acting) (2005-2007)
- Ethiopia - Seyoum Mesfin (1991-2010)
- Gabon - Jean Ping (1999-2008)
- The Gambia -
  1. Sidi Moro Sanneh (2004-2005)
  2. Musa Gibril Bala Gaye (2005)
  3. Lamin Kaba Bajo (2005-2006)
- Ghana - Nana Akufo-Addo (2003-2007)
- Guinea -
  1. Mamady Condé (2004-2005)
  2. Fatoumata Kaba (2005-2006)
- Guinea-Bissau -
  1. Soares Sambu (2004-2005)
  2. António Isaac Monteiro (2005-2007)
- Kenya -
  1. Chirau Ali Mwakwere (2004-2005)
  2. Raphael Tuju (2005-2008)
- Lesotho - Monyane Moleleki (2004-2007)
- Liberia - Thomas Nimely (2003-2006)
- Libya - Abdel Rahman Shalgham (2000-2009)
- Madagascar - Marcel Ranjeva (2002-2009)
- Malawi -
  1. George Chaponda (2004-2005)
  2. Davis Katsonga (2005-2006)
- Mali - Moctar Ouane (2004-2011)
- Mauritania -
  1. Mohamed Vall Ould Bellal (2003-2005)
  2. Ahmed Ould Sid'Ahmed (2005-2007)
- Mauritius -
  1. Jaya Krishna Cuttaree (2003-2005)
  2. Madan Dulloo (2005-2008)
- Morocco - Mohamed Benaissa (1999-2007)
  - Western Sahara - Mohamed Salem Ould Salek (1998–2023)
- Mozambique -
  1. Leonardo Simão (1994-2005)
  2. Alcinda Abreu (2005-2008)
- Namibia - Marco Hausiku (2004-2010)
- Niger - Aïchatou Mindaoudou (2001-2010)
- Nigeria - Oluyemi Adeniji (2003-2006)
- Rwanda - Charles Murigande (2002-2008)
- São Tomé and Príncipe - Ovídio Manuel Barbosa Pequeno (2004-2006)
- Senegal - Cheikh Tidiane Gadio (2000-2009)
- Seychelles -
  1. Jérémie Bonnelame (1997-2005)
  2. Patrick Pillay (2005-2009)
- Sierra Leone - Momodu Koroma (2002-2007)
- Somalia - Abdullahi Sheikh Ismail (2004-2006)
- Somaliland - Edna Adan Ismail (2003-2006)
- South Africa - Nkosazana Dlamini-Zuma (1999-2009)
- Sudan -
  1. Mustafa Osman Ismail (1998-2005)
  2. Lam Akol (2005-2007)
- Swaziland - Mabili Dlamini (2003-2006)
- Tanzania - Jakaya Kikwete (1995-2006)
- Togo -
  1. Kokou Tozoun (2003-2005)
  2. Zarifou Ayéva (2005-2007)
- Tunisia -
  1. Abdelbaki Hermassi (2004-2005)
  2. Abdelwahab Abdallah (2005-2010)
- Uganda -
  1. Tom Butime (2004-2005)
  2. Sam Kutesa (2005–2021)
- Zambia -
  1. Kalombo Mwansa (2002-2005)
  2. Ronnie Shikapwasha (2005-2006)
- Zimbabwe -
  1. Stan Mudenge (1995-2005)
  2. Simbarashe Mumbengegwi (2005–2017)

== Asia ==
- Afghanistan - Abdullah Abdullah (2001-2006)
- Armenia - Vartan Oskanian (1998-2008)
- Azerbaijan - Elmar Mammadyarov (2004–2020)
  - Nagorno-Karabakh -
    1. Arman Melikyan (2004-2005)
    2. Georgy Petrosyan (2005-2011)
- Bahrain -
  1. Sheikh Muhammad ibn Mubarak ibn Hamad Al Khalifah (1971-2005)
  2. Sheikh Khalid ibn Ahmad Al Khalifah (2005–2020)
- Bangladesh - Morshed Khan (2001-2006)
- Bhutan - Khandu Wangchuk (2003-2007)
- Brunei - Pengiran Muda Mohamed Bolkiah (1984–2015)
- Cambodia - Hor Namhong (1998–2016)
- China - Li Zhaoxing (2003-2007)
- East Timor - José Ramos-Horta (2000-2006)
- Georgia -
  1. Salome Zourabichvili (2004-2005)
  2. Gela Bezhuashvili (2005-2008)
  - Abkhazia - Sergei Shamba (2004-2010)
  - South Ossetia - Murat Dzhioyev (1998-2012)
- India -
  1. Natwar Singh (2004-2005)
  2. Manmohan Singh (2005-2006)
- Indonesia - Hassan Wirajuda (2001-2009)
- Iran -
  1. Kamal Kharazi (1997-2005)
  2. Manouchehr Mottaki (2005-2010)
- Iraq - Hoshyar Zebari (2003–2014)
- Israel - Silvan Shalom (2003-2006)
  - Palestinian Authority -
    1. Nabil Shaath (2003-2005)
    2. Nasser al-Qudwa (2005-2006)
- Japan -
  1. Nobutaka Machimura (2004-2005)
  2. Taro Aso (2005-2007)
- Jordan -
  1. Hani al-Mulki (2004-2005)
  2. Farouq Qasrawi (2005)
  3. Abdul Ilah Khatib (2005-2007)
- Kazakhstan - Kassym-Jomart Tokayev (2002-2007)
- North Korea - Paek Nam-sun (1998-2007)
- South Korea - Ban Ki-moon (2004-2006)
- Kuwait - Sheikh Mohammad Sabah Al-Salem Al-Sabah (2003-2011)
- Kyrgyzstan -
  1. Askar Aitmatov (2002-2005)
  2. Roza Otunbayeva (2005)
  3. Alikbek Jekshenkulov (2005-2007)
- Laos - Somsavat Lengsavad (1993-2006)
- Lebanon -
  1. Mahmoud Hammoud (2004-2005)
  2. Fawzi Salloukh (2005-2009)
- Malaysia - Syed Hamid Albar (1999-2008)
- Maldives -
  1. Fathulla Jameel (1978-2005)
  2. Ahmed Shaheed (2005-2007)
- Mongolia - Tsendiin Mönkh-Orgil (2004-2006)
- Myanmar - Nyan Win (2004-2011)
- Nepal -
  1. Sher Bahadur Deuba (2004-2005)
  2. Ramesh Nath Pandey (2005-2006)
- Oman - Yusuf bin Alawi bin Abdullah (1982–2020)
- Pakistan - Khurshid Mahmud Kasuri (2002-2007)
- Philippines - Alberto Romulo (2004-2011)
- Qatar - Sheikh Hamad bin Jassim bin Jaber Al Thani (1992-2013)
- Saudi Arabia - Prince Saud bin Faisal bin Abdulaziz Al Saud (1975–2015
- Singapore - George Yeo (2004-2011)
- Sri Lanka -
  1. Lakshman Kadirgamar (2004-2005)
  2. Anura Bandaranaike (2005)
  3. Mangala Samaraweera (2005-2007)
- Syria - Farouk al-Sharaa (1984-2006)
- Taiwan - Mark Chen (2004-2006)
- Tajikistan - Talbak Nazarov (1994-2006)
- Thailand -
  1. Surakiart Sathirathai (2001-2005)
  2. Kantathi Suphamongkhon (2005-2006)
- Turkey - Abdullah Gül (2003-2007)
- Turkmenistan - Raşit Meredow (2001–present)
- United Arab Emirates - Rashid Abdullah Al Nuaimi (1980-2006)
- Uzbekistan -
  1. Sodiq Safoyev (2003-2005)
  2. Elyor Ganiyev (2005-2006)
- Vietnam - Nguyễn Dy Niên (2000-2006)
- Yemen - Abu Bakr al-Qirbi (2001-2014)

== Europe ==
- Albania -
  1. Kastriot Islami (2003-2005)
  2. Besnik Mustafaj (2005-2007)
- Andorra - Juli Minoves Triquell (2001-2007)
- Austria - Ursula Plassnik (2004-2008)
- Belarus - Sergei Martynov (2003-2012)
- Belgium - Karel De Gucht (2004-2009)
  - Brussels-Capital Region - Guy Vanhengel (2000-2009)
  - Flanders - Geert Bourgeois (2004-2008)
  - Wallonia - Marie-Dominique Simonet (2004-2009)
- Bosnia and Herzegovina - Mladen Ivanić (2003-2007)
- Bulgaria -
  1. Solomon Passy (2001-2005)
  2. Ivailo Kalfin (2005-2009)
- Croatia -
  1. Miomir Žužul (2003-2005)
  2. Kolinda Grabar-Kitarović (2005-2008)
- Cyprus - Georgios Iacovou (2003-2006)
  - Northern Cyprus - Serdar Denktaş (2004-2006)
- Czech Republic - Cyril Svoboda (2002-2006)
- Denmark - Per Stig Møller (2001-2010)
  - Greenland - Josef Motzfeldt (2003-2007)
- Estonia -
  1. Kristiina Ojuland (2002-2005)
  2. Jaak Jõerüüt (acting) (2005)
  3. Rein Lang (2005)
  4. Urmas Paet (2005–2014)
- Finland - Erkki Tuomioja (2000-2007)
- France -
  1. Michel Barnier (2004-2005)
  2. Philippe Douste-Blazy (2005-2007)
- Germany -
  1. Joschka Fischer (1998-2005)
  2. Frank-Walter Steinmeier (2005-2009)
- Greece - Petros Molyviatis (2004-2006)
- Hungary - Ferenc Somogyi (2004-2006)
- Iceland -
  1. Davíð Oddsson (2004-2005)
  2. Geir Haarde (2005-2006)
- Ireland - Dermot Ahern (2004-2008)
- Italy - Gianfranco Fini (2004-2006)
- Latvia - Artis Pabriks (2004-2007)
- Liechtenstein -
  1. Ernst Walch (2001-2005)
  2. Rita Kieber-Beck (2005-2009)
- Lithuania - Antanas Valionis (2000-2006)
- Luxembourg - Jean Asselborn (2004–present)
- Republic of Macedonia - Ilinka Mitreva (2002-2006)
- Malta - Michael Frendo (2004-2008)
- Moldova - Andrei Stratan (2004-2009)
  - Transnistria - Valeriy Litskai (2000-2008)
- Monaco - Rainier Imperti (2005-2006)
- Netherlands - Ben Bot (2003-2007)
- Norway -
  1. Jan Petersen (2001-2005)
  2. Jonas Gahr Støre (2005-2012)
- Poland -
  1. Włodzimierz Cimoszewicz (2001-2005)
  2. Adam Daniel Rotfeld (2005)
  3. Stefan Meller (2005-2006)
- Portugal -
  1. António Monteiro (2004-2005)
  2. Diogo de Freitas do Amaral (2005-2006)
- Romania - Mihai-Răzvan Ungureanu (2004-2007)
- Russia - Sergey Lavrov (2004–present)
- San Marino - Fabio Berardi (2003-2006)
- Serbia and Montenegro - Vuk Drašković (2004-2007)
  - Montenegro - Miodrag Vlahović (2004-2006)
- Slovakia - Eduard Kukan (1998-2006)
- Slovenia - Dimitrij Rupel (2004-2008)
- Spain - Miguel Ángel Moratinos (2004-2010)
- Sweden - Laila Freivalds (2003-2006)
- Switzerland - Micheline Calmy-Rey (2003-2011)
- Ukraine -
  1. Kostyantyn Gryshchenko (2003-2005)
  2. Borys Tarasyuk (2005-2007)
- United Kingdom - Jack Straw (2001-2006)
- Vatican City - Archbishop Giovanni Lajolo (2003-2006)

== North America and the Caribbean ==
- Antigua and Barbuda -
  1. Harold Lovell (2004-2005)
  2. Baldwin Spencer (2005–2014)
- The Bahamas - Fred Mitchell (2002-2007)
- Barbados - Dame Billie Miller (1994-2008)
- Belize - Godfrey Smith (2003-2006)
- Canada - Pierre Pettigrew (2004-2006)
  - Quebec - Monique Gagnon-Tremblay (2003-2008)
- Costa Rica - Roberto Tovar Faja (2002-2006)
- Cuba - Felipe Pérez Roque (1999-2009)
- Dominica -
  1. Osborne Riviere (2001-2005)
  2. Charles Savarin (2005-2007)
- Dominican Republic - Carlos Morales Troncoso (2004–2014)
- El Salvador - Francisco Laínez (2004-2008)
- Grenada - Elvin Nimrod (2000-2008)
- Guatemala - Jorge Briz Abularach (2004-2006)
- Haiti -
  1. Yvon Siméon (2004-2005)
  2. Hérard Abraham (2005-2006)
- Honduras -
  1. Leonidas Rosa Bautista (2003-2005)
  2. Mario Fortín (2005-2006)
- Jamaica - Keith Desmond Knight (2001-2006)
- Mexico - Luis Ernesto Derbez (2003-2006)
- Netherlands Antilles - Etienne Ys (2004-2006)
- Nicaragua - Norman José Caldera Cardenal (2002-2007)
- Panama - Samuel Lewis Navarro (2004-2009)
- Puerto Rico –
  1. Jose Izquierdo Encarnacion (2003–2005)
  2. Marisara Pont Marchese (2005)
  3. Fernando Bonilla (2005–2009)
- Saint Kitts and Nevis - Timothy Harris (2001-2008)
- Saint Lucia - Petrus Compton (2004-2006)
- Saint Vincent and the Grenadines
  1. Louis Straker (2001-2005)
  2. Mike Browne (2005)
  3. Louis Straker (2005-2010)
- Trinidad and Tobago - Knowlson Gift (2001-2006)
- United States -
  1. Colin Powell (2001-2005)
  2. Condoleezza Rice (2005-2009)

== Oceania ==
- Australia - Alexander Downer (1996-2007)
- Fiji - Kaliopate Tavola (2000-2006)
- French Polynesia -
  1. Gaston Flosse (2004-2005)
  2. Oscar Temaru (2005-2006)
- Kiribati - Anote Tong (2003–2016)
- Marshall Islands - Gerald Zackios (2001-2008)
- Micronesia - Sebastian Anefal (2003-2007)
- Nauru - David Adeang (2004-2007)
- New Zealand -
  1. Phil Goff (1999-2005)
  2. Winston Peters (2005-2008)
  - Cook Islands -
    1. Tom Marsters (2004-2005)
    2. Wilkie Rasmussen (2005-2009)
  - Niue - Young Vivian (2002-2008)
- Palau - Temmy Shmull (2001-2009)
- Papua New Guinea - Sir Rabbie Namaliu (2002-2006)
- Samoa - Tuilaepa Aiono Sailele Malielegaoi (1998–2021)
- Solomon Islands - Laurie Chan (2002-2006)
- Tonga - Sonatane Tu'a Taumoepeau Tupou (2004-2009)
- Tuvalu - Maatia Toafa (2004-2006)
- Vanuatu - Sato Kilman (2004-2007)

== South America ==
- Argentina -
  1. Rafael Bielsa (2003-2005)
  2. Jorge Taiana (2005-2010)
- Bolivia -
  1. Juan Ignacio Siles (2003-2005)
  2. Armando Loaiza (2005-2006)
- Brazil - Celso Amorim (2003-2011)
- Chile - Ignacio Walker Prieto (2004-2006)
- Colombia - Carolina Barco (2002-2006)
- Ecuador -
  1. Patricio Zuquilanda (2003-2005)
  2. Antonio Parra Gil (2005)
  3. Francisco Carrión (2005-2007)
- Guyana - Rudy Insanally (2001-2008)
- Paraguay - Leila Rachid de Cowles (2003-2006)
- Peru -
  1. Manuel Rodríguez Cuadros (2003-2005)
  2. Fernando Olivera (2005)
  3. Óscar Maúrtua de Romaña (2005-2006)
- Suriname -
  1. Marie Levens (2000-2005)
  2. Lygia Kraag-Keteldijk (2005-2010)
- Uruguay -
  1. Didier Opertti (1998-2005)
  2. Reinaldo Gargano (2005-2008)
- Venezuela - Alí Rodríguez Araque (2004-2006)
