= Lieutenant governor (United States) =

State government official, typically second highest officer after the governor

Method for electing the lieutenant governor. Same ticket Same ticket in the general election, separate nomination in the primaries Separate election Title given to leader of state senate Position nonexistent

A lieutenant governor is an official in state governments of 46 out of 50 US states. In most cases, the lieutenant governor is the highest officer of state after the governor, standing in for that officer when they are absent from the state or temporarily incapacitated. In the event a governor dies, resigns or is removed from office, the lieutenant governor typically becomes governor.

In 27 states, the governor and lieutenant governor are elected on the same ticket, ensuring that they come from the same political party. In 17 states, they are elected separately and, thus, may come from different parties. Among the seven states without a separate, full-time office of lieutenant governor, two states have a post of lieutenant governor that is filled by the highest officer of the state senate. In Tennessee, the full title of the leader of the Tennessee Senate is "lieutenant governor and speaker of the Senate." In West Virginia, the title of lieutenant governor is assigned by statute to the Senate president.

In many states the positions have few mandated responsibilities. The role in California was criticized by the San Francisco Chronicle as "get up, read the paper, see if the governor is dead, if not, go back to sleep". In the 2010 election for the Lieutenant Governor of Rhode Island, 40% of the vote was won by Robert J. Healey, a perennial candidate who wanted to abolish the office.

With the exception of Georgia, Tennessee, Texas (until January 19, 2027, when Lieutenant Governor-elect Vikki Goodwin is set to be sworn in), Washington and West Virginia, every state has had a female lieutenant governor or equivalent.

== Duties ==
The duties of lieutenant governors vary from state to state. In most states, the office's duties are laid out in the state's original state constitution; however, responsibilities may have been added or diminished by statute or executive order.

=== Duties in most states ===
Generally, the lieutenant governor is the state's highest officer following the governor and assumes the role when the governor is out of state or incapacitated. The lieutenant governor also becomes the governor should the governor die, resign or be removed from office.

The lieutenant governor is also frequently the president of the upper house of the state legislature, similar to the vice president of the United States. More than half of the lieutenant governors preside over their state senate, though others typically only do so ceremonially while a president pro tem or other leader controls the floor agenda. Lieutenant governors are the only officials with specific duties and powers in two branches of state government: the executive and legislative branches. Most pursue legislative initiatives; many testify locally and in Washington D.C. in various capacities; some serve on the governors' cabinets, while others maintain varied portfolios of duties. In many states, the duties of lieutenant governor are increased by legislation to include the lieutenant governor on state boards, commissions and task forces.

Lieutenant governors are members of the National Lieutenant Governors Association.

=== Other duties ===
Since Alaska, Hawaii and Utah do not have a Secretary of State, the lieutenant governor performs the duties generally granted to that office. In New Jersey, the governor must appoint the lieutenant governor to head a cabinet-level department or administrative agency within the state government's executive branch—but not to the post of state attorney general. The lieutenant governor of Texas plays an active role as presiding officer of the State Senate and is sometimes debated to be more powerful than the state's governor.

== Diversity ==
In the 18 states where gubernatorial candidates select a lieutenant governor to be their running mates, the candidates may be more likely to choose someone of a different gender or race in order to balance a ticket. This has resulted in greater diversity in lieutenant governors, giving them a prime position to later become governor by succession or election. Eighty percent of Democratic lieutenant governors in 2024 are women or people of color.

== Recently established positions ==
=== Arizona ===
The secretary of state in Arizona is the first in line to succeed the governor in the event of death, disability, resignation, or removal from office. The line of succession also includes the attorney general, state treasurer and superintendent of public instruction.

In November 2022, Arizona voters approved a state constitutional amendment to create the position and office of the lieutenant governor beginning with the 2026 election cycle. The position will be elected on a joint ticket with the governor. The lieutenant governor would ascend to the governorship if the incumbent governor dies, resigns or is removed from office. On November 3, 2026 former Mesa mayor, John Giles, was elected as Arizona’s first lieutenant governor along with Governor Katie Hobbs.

=== New Jersey ===
In November 2005, New Jersey voters approved a constitutional amendment to create the office of lieutenant governor, which became effective with the 2009 general election. The state's first lieutenant governor, Kim Guadagno, took office in January 2010.

The position was created in response to the unusual circumstances surrounding the aftermath of the 2001 gubernatorial election. Senate President Donald DiFrancesco became acting governor early that year after Christine Todd Whitman resigned to take office as EPA Administrator. DiFrancesco's term as Senate president expired one week before governor-elect Jim McGreevey was to assume office in January 2002, and the 2001 State Senate elections resulted in the balance of the New Jersey Senate being tied between the two parties. Due to the tie, Democrat Richard Codey and Republican John O. Bennett were elected as Senate co-presidents, and in the 90-minute period between the expiration of DiFrancesco's term and the swearing-in of Codey and Bennett, State Attorney General John Farmer Jr. served as acting governor due to the position of Senate president being vacant. Subsequently, Bennett and Codey served as acting governor for three days each until McGreevey took office. All told, five people had served as governor or acting governor in the space of eight days.

== States and territories without a lieutenant governor ==
=== Maine ===
In Maine, if the governor cannot serve, the immediate successor is the Senate president.

=== New Hampshire ===
Whenever the governor dies, resigns, is removed from office or unable to perform the duties of office, the Senate president serves as "acting governor".

=== Oregon ===
The gubernatorial line of succession is set forth in the state constitution, at Article V, Section 8a. It defines who may become or act as the governor of Oregon upon the incapacity, death, resignation, or removal from office (by impeachment and subsequent removal or recall) of a sitting governor. The current chain of succession is: secretary of state, state treasurer, president of the State Senate, and speaker of the House of Representatives. When a governor leaves office, the next available elected individual in the succession becomes governor until the next general biennial election, when a governor will be elected to either serve out the last two years of a regular term or a new four-year term. See: line of succession. In 2007, legislation was proposed to establish an office of lieutenant governor.

=== Wyoming ===
In Wyoming, the secretary of state stands first in the line of succession.

=== Puerto Rico ===
The highest-ranking officer after the governor of Puerto Rico is the chief of staff, who is appointed by the governor himself rather than elected. In terms of line of succession, the secretary of State of Puerto Rico acts as acting governor when the governor is temporarily disabled or unable to discharge his duties. If there is a permanent vacancy in the governorship, the Constitution of Puerto Rico establishes the secretary to become governor for the remainder of the term. The secretary of state also serves as acting governor whenever the governor is temporarily not present in Puerto Rico, with territorial law also establishing a line of succession for when both the governor and the secretary are unable to perform their duties.

== See also ==
- List of current United States lieutenant governors
- List of female lieutenant governors in the United States
- Gubernatorial lines of succession in the United States
- State constitutional officer
- National Lieutenant Governors Association
