= List of female lieutenant governors in the United States =

As of November 9, 2026, there are 22 women currently serving (excluding acting capacity) as lieutenant governors in the United States. Overall, 129 women have served (including acting capacity).

Women have been elected lieutenant governor in 41 of the 50 states. The states that have the position of lieutenant governor and have not yet elected a woman are Georgia, Tennessee, Washington, and West Virginia. The states that do not have the position of lieutenant governor are Arizona (until January 2027), Maine, New Hampshire, Oregon, and Wyoming. The holders of the first in line to the governorship there, either the secretary of state or senate president, are listed here separately.

Thirteen female lieutenant governors have become governors of their respective states, and six female secretaries of state have become governors of their respective states.

Nancy Dick is the oldest living former female lieutenant governor, at the age of 96.

== History ==
The first woman to become lieutenant governor was Matilda Dodge Wilson (R), who was appointed lieutenant governor of Michigan in 1940 by Luren Dickinson. The first woman elected as lieutenant governor was Consuelo N. Bailey (R) of Vermont, who was elected in 1954.

In 1978, Jean King (D) was elected as the first female Asian American lieutenant governor, when she was elected lieutenant governor of Hawaii. In 2002, Jennette Bradley (R) was elected as the first female African American lieutenant governor, when she was elected lieutenant governor of Ohio. In 2014, Evelyn Sanguinetti (R) was elected as the first female Hispanic or Latino lieutenant governor, when she was elected lieutenant governor of Illinois.

Kentucky was the first state to hold a transfer of power from one female lieutenant governor to another, when Martha Layne Collins was elected to succeed Thelma Stovall in 1979.

Minnesota has had the most female lieutenant governors or other deputy leaders of any state in the Union, with nine consecutive female lieutenant governors since 1983. Amy Klobuchar became first woman elected as governor of the state in 2026.

No state ever had both a female governor and permanent female lieutenant governor at the same time until Arkansas and Massachusetts achieved this feat as a result of the 2022 gubernatorial elections. In New York, Andrea Stewart-Cousins became acting Lieutenant Governor on Kathy Hochul's succeeding Governor Andrew M. Cuomo of New York during his third term on August 24, 2021. On December 16, 2024, Chris Cournoyer was appointed Lieutenant Governor of Iowa by Kim Reynolds, succeeding acting Lieutenant Governor Amy Sinclair following the resignation of Adam Gregg. In 2025, Virginia elected Democrat Abigail Spanberger while simultaneously electing Democrat Ghazala Hashmi. As of November 2026, five states have both a female governor and lieutenant governor: Arkansas, Iowa, Massachusetts, New Jersey, and Virginia.

From 1997 to 2009, Arizona had two female governors and two concurrently serving female secretaries of state.

== List of female lieutenant governors ==
Denotes incumbent lieutenant governor
- Italics denotes acting lieutenant governor

Name (lifespan)	Image	State	Party	Term start	Term end	Length of service	Left for
Matilda Dodge Wilson (1883–1967)	Lt. Gov. Wilson	Michigan	Republican	November 19, 1940	January 1, 1941	1 year, 0 days	Retired
Consuelo N. Bailey (1899–1976)	Lt. Gov. Bailey	Vermont	Republican	January 8, 1955	January 10, 1957	2 years, 2 days	Retired
Maude Frazier (1881–1963)	Lt. Gov. Frazier	Nevada	Democratic	July 4, 1962	January 1, 1963	181 days	Retired
Mary Anne Krupsak (1932–2024)	Lt. Gov. Krupsak	New York	Democratic	January 1, 1975	December 31, 1978	3 years, 364 days	Retired to run for the Democratic nomination for governor in 1978 (defeated in primary)
Thelma Stovall (1919–1994)	Lt. Gov. Stovall	Kentucky	Democratic	December 9, 1975	December 11, 1979	4 years, 2 days	Retired to run for the Democratic nomination for governor in 1979 (defeated in primary)
Evelyn Gandy (1920–2007)	Lt. Gov. Gandy	Mississippi	Democratic	January 20, 1976	January 22, 1980	4 years, 2 days	Retired to run for the Democratic nomination for governor in 1979 (defeated in primary)
Jean King (1925–2013)	Lt. Gov. King	Hawaii	Democratic	December 2, 1978	December 2, 1982	4 years, 0 days	Retired to run for the Democratic nomination for governor in 1982 (defeated in primary)
Nancy Dick (born 1930)	Lt. Gov. Dick	Colorado	Democratic	January 10, 1979	January 13, 1987	8 years, 3 days	Retired
Madeleine Kunin (born 1933)	Lt. Gov. Kunin	Vermont	Democratic	January 10, 1979	January 10, 1983	4 years, 0 days	Retired to run as the Democratic nominee for governor in 1982 (defeated) (Note: Later served as the Governor of Vermont (1985–1991))
Nancy Stevenson (1929–2001)	Lt. Gov. Stevenson	South Carolina	Democratic	January 10, 1979	January 12, 1983	4 years, 2 days	Retired
Martha Layne Collins (1936–2025)		Kentucky	Democratic	December 11, 1979	December 13, 1983	4 years, 2 days	Retired to run as the Democratic nominee for governor in 1983 (elected); Governor of Kentucky (1983–1987)
Martha Griffiths (1912–2003)	Lt. Gov. Griffiths	Michigan	Democratic	January 1, 1983	January 1, 1991	8 years, 0 days	Retired (Note: Previously served as the U.S. representative from Michigan 17th (1955–1974))
Marlene Johnson (born 1946)	Lt. Gov. Johnson	Minnesota	Democratic (DFL)	January 3, 1983	January 7, 1991	8 years, 4 days	Lost reelection
Ruth Meiers (1925–1987)	Lt. Gov. Meiers	North Dakota	Democratic–NPL	January 1, 1985	March 19, 1987	2 years, 77 days	Died
Harriett Woods (1927–2007)	Lt. Gov. Woods	Missouri	Democratic	January 14, 1985	January 9, 1989	3 years, 361 days	Retired
Evelyn Murphy (born 1940)	Lt. Gov. Murphy	Massachusetts	Democratic	January 8, 1987	January 3, 1991	3 years, 360 days	Retired to run for the Democratic nomination for governor in 1990 (dropped out of primary)
Jo Ann Zimmerman (1936–2019)	Lt. Gov. Zimmerman	Iowa	Democratic	January 16, 1987	January 18, 1991	4 years, 2 days	Lost reelection
Connie Binsfeld (1924–2014)	Lt. Gov. Binsfeld	Michigan	Republican	January 1, 1991	January 1, 1999	8 years, 0 days	Retired
Joy Corning (1932–2017)	Lt. Gov. Corning	Iowa	Republican	January 18, 1991	January 15, 1999	7 years, 362 days	Retired to run for the Republican nomination for governor in 1998 (dropped out of primary)
Maxine Moul (born 1947)	Lt. Gov. Moul	Nebraska	Democratic	January 9, 1991	October 5, 1993	2 years, 269 days	Resigned
Joanell Dyrstad (born 1942)	Lt. Gov. Dyrstad	Minnesota	Republican	January 7, 1991	January 3, 1995	3 years, 361 days	Retired to run for the Republican nomination for the U.S. Senate in 1994 (defeated in primary)
Sue Wagner (born 1940)	Lt. Gov. Wagner	Nevada	Republican	January 7, 1991	January 2, 1995	3 years, 360 days	Retired
Eunice Groark (1938–2018)	Lt. Gov. Groark	Connecticut	A Connecticut Party	January 9, 1991	January 4, 1995	3 years, 360 days	Retired to run as the A Connecticut Party nominee for governor in 1994 (defeated)
Melinda Schwegmann (born 1946)	Lt. Gov. Schwegmann	Louisiana	Democratic	January 13, 1992	January 8, 1996	3 years, 360 days	Retired to run for the Democratic nomination for governor in 1995 (defeated in primary)
Gaioi Tufele Galeai	lt. Gov. Tufele Galeai	American Samoa	Republican	August 1992	January 4, 1993	3–4 months	Retired
Rosemarie Myrdal (1929–2023)	Lt. Gov. Myrdal	North Dakota	Republican	December 15, 1992	December 15, 2000	8 years, 0 days	Retired
Barbara Snelling (1928–2015)	Lt. Gov. Snelling	Vermont	Republican	January 1, 1993	January 1, 1997	4 years, 0 days	Retired
Olene Walker (1930–2015)	Lt. Gov. Walker	Utah	Republican	January 4, 1993	November 5, 2003	10 years, 305 days	Became Governor of Utah (2003–2005)
Ruth Ann Minner (1935–2021)	Lt. Gov. Minner	Delaware	Democratic	January 19, 1993	January 3, 2001	7 years, 350 days	Term-limited and ran as the Democratic nominee for governor in 2000 (elected); Governor of Delaware (2001–2009)
Kim Robak (born 1955)	Lt. Gov. Robak	Nebraska	Democratic	October 5, 1993	January 7, 1999	5 years, 98 days	Retired
Mazie Hirono (born 1947)	Lt. Gov. Hirono	Hawaii	Democratic	December 2, 1994	December 2, 2002	8 years, 0 days	Term-limited and ran as the Democratic nominee for governor in 2002 (defeated) (Note: Later served as U.S. Representative from Hawaii 2nd (2007-2013) & U.S. senator from Hawaii (2013–present))
Fran Ulmer (born 1947)	Lt. Gov. Ulmer	Alaska	Democratic	December 5, 1994	December 2, 2002	7 years, 362 days	Retired to run as the Democratic nominee for governor in 2002 (defeated)
Carole Hillard (1936–2007)		South Dakota	Republican	January 1, 1995	January 1, 2003	8 years, 0 days	Retired
Betsy McCaughey (born 1948)		New York	Republican	January 1, 1995	December 31, 1998	3 years, 364 days	Retired to run for the Democratic nomination for governor in 1998 (defeated in primary) (Note: Elected as a Republican in 1994, but switched to Democratic in 1997)
Betsy McCaughey (born 1948)		New York	Democratic	January 1, 1995	December 31, 1998	3 years, 364 days	Retired to run for the Democratic nomination for governor in 1998 (defeated in primary)
Madeleine Bordallo (born 1933)		Guam	Democratic	January 2, 1995	January 6, 2003	8 years, 4 days	Retired to run for Delegate to the U.S. House of Representatives from Guam (2003–2019)
Joanne Benson (born 1943)		Minnesota	Republican	January 3, 1995	January 4, 1999	4 years, 1 day	Retired to run for the Republican nomination for governor in 1998 (defeated in primary)
Gail Schoettler (born 1943)		Colorado	Democratic	January 3, 1995	January 12, 1999	4 years, 9 days	Retired to run as the Democratic nominee for governor in 1998 (defeated)
Jodi Rell (1946–2024)		Connecticut	Republican	January 4, 1995	July 1, 2004	9 years, 179 days	Became Governor of Connecticut (2004–2011)
Nancy Hollister (born 1949)		Ohio	Republican	January 9, 1995	December 31, 1998	3 years, 356 days	Became Governor of Ohio (1998–1999)
Sheila Frahm (born 1945)		Kansas	Republican	January 9, 1995	June 11, 1996	1 year, 154 days	Resigned to become U.S. senator from Kansas (1996)
Mary Fallin (born 1954)		Oklahoma	Republican	January 9, 1995	January 2, 2007	11 years, 358 days	Retired to become the U.S. representative from Oklahoma 5th (2007–2011) (Note: Later became Governor of Oklahoma (2011–2019))
Kathleen Kennedy Townsend (born 1951)		Maryland	Democratic	January 18, 1995	January 15, 2003	7 years, 362 days	Retired to run as the Democratic nominee for governor in 2002 (defeated)
Kathleen Blanco (1942–2019)		Louisiana	Democratic	January 8, 1996	January 12, 2004	8 years, 4 days	Retired to run as the Democratic nominee for governor in 2003 (elected); Governor of Louisiana (2004–2008)
Judy Martz (1943–2017)		Montana	Republican	January 6, 1997	January 1, 2001	3 years, 361 days	Retired to run as the Republican nominee for governor in 2000 (elected); Governor of Montana (2001–2005)
Mary Donohue (born 1947)		New York	Republican	January 1, 1999	December 31, 2006	7 years, 364 days	Retired to become a judge of the New York Court of Claims
Lorraine Hunt (born 1939)		Nevada	Republican	January 4, 1999	January 20, 2007	8 years, 16 days	Retired to run for the Republican nomination for governor in 2006 (defeated in primary)
Mae Schunk (born 1934)		Minnesota	Reform	January 4, 1999	January 6, 2003	4 years, 2 days	Retired (Note: Elected as a Reformer, but Minnesota party split from Reform in 2000 and changed name to the Independence Party)
Mae Schunk (born 1934)		Minnesota	Independence	January 4, 1999	January 6, 2003	4 years, 2 days	Retired
Jane Swift (born 1965)		Massachusetts	Republican	January 7, 1999	January 2, 2003	3 years, 360 days	Became Acting Governor of Massachusetts (2001–2003)
Corinne Wood (1954–2021)		Illinois	Republican	January 11, 1999	January 13, 2003	4 years, 2 days	Retired to run for the Republican nomination for governor in 2002 (defeated in primary)
Maureen O'Connor (born 1951)		Ohio	Republican	January 11, 1999	December 31, 2002	3 years, 354 days	Retired to run as the Republican nominee for Associate Justice of the Ohio Supreme Court (elected)
Sally Pederson (born 1951)		Iowa	Democratic	January 15, 1999	January 12, 2007	7 years, 362 days	Retired
Amy Tuck (born 1963)		Mississippi	Democratic	January 11, 2000	January 10, 2008	7 years, 364 days	Retired (Note: Elected as a Democrat in 1999, but switched to Republican in 2002)
Amy Tuck (born 1963)		Mississippi	Republican	January 11, 2000	January 10, 2008	7 years, 364 days	Retired
Bev Perdue (born 1947)		North Carolina	Democratic	January 6, 2001	January 10, 2009	8 years, 4 days	Retired to run as the Democratic nominee for governor in 2008 (elected); Governor of North Carolina (2009–2013)
Margaret Farrow (1934–2022)		Wisconsin	Republican	May 9, 2001	January 6, 2003	1 year, 242 days	Lost reelection
Diane Denish (born 1949)		New Mexico	Democratic	January 1, 2003	January 1, 2011	8 years, 0 days	Retired to run as the Democratic nominee for governor in 2010 (defeated)
Kerry Healey (born 1960)		Massachusetts	Republican	January 2, 2003	January 4, 2007	4 years, 2 days	Retired to run as the Republican nominee for governor in 2006 (defeated)
Carol Molnau (born 1949)		Minnesota	Republican	January 6, 2003	January 3, 2011	7 years, 362 days	Retired
Barbara Lawton (born 1951)		Wisconsin	Democratic	January 6, 2003	January 3, 2011	7 years, 362 days	Retired to run for the Democratic nomination for governor in 2010 (dropped out of primary)
Jennette Bradley (born 1952)		Ohio	Republican	January 13, 2003	January 5, 2005	1 year, 358 days	Resigned to become Ohio State Treasurer
Jane Norton (born 1954)		Colorado	Republican	January 13, 2003	January 9, 2007	3 years, 361 days	Retired
Lucy Baxley (1937–2016)		Alabama	Democratic	January 20, 2003	January 15, 2007	3 years, 360 days	Retired to run as the Democratic nominee for governor in 2006 (defeated)
Catherine Baker Knoll (1930–2008)		Pennsylvania	Democratic	January 21, 2003	November 12, 2008	5 years, 296 days	Died
Toni Jennings (born 1949)		Florida	Republican	March 3, 2003	January 2, 2007	3 years, 305 days	Retired
Kathy Davis (born 1956)		Indiana	Democratic	October 20, 2003	January 10, 2005	1 year, 82 days	Lost reelection
Becky Skillman (born 1950)		Indiana	Republican	January 10, 2005	January 14, 2013	8 years, 4 days	Retired
Elizabeth Roberts (born 1957)		Rhode Island	Democratic	January 2, 2007	January 6, 2015	8 years, 4 days	Retired
Jari Askins (born 1953)		Oklahoma	Democratic	January 2, 2007	January 10, 2011	4 years, 8 days	Retired to run as the Democratic nominee for governor in 2010 (defeated)
Barbara O'Brien (born 1950)		Colorado	Democratic	January 9, 2007	January 11, 2011	4 years, 2 days	Retired
Patty Judge (born 1943)		Iowa	Democratic	January 12, 2007	January 14, 2011	4 years, 2 days	Lost reelection
Mona Pasquil (born 1962)		California	Democratic	November 4, 2009	April 27, 2010	174 days	Retired
Kim Guadagno (born 1959)		New Jersey	Republican	January 19, 2010	January 16, 2018	7 years, 362 days	Term-limited and ran as the Republican nominee for governor in 2017 (defeated)
Rebecca Kleefisch (born 1975)		Wisconsin	Republican	January 3, 2011	January 7, 2019	8 years, 4 days	Lost reelection
Yvonne Prettner Solon (born 1946)		Minnesota	Democratic (DFL)	January 3, 2011	January 5, 2015	4 years, 2 days	Retired
Jennifer Carroll (born 1959)		Florida	Republican	January 4, 2011	March 12, 2013	2 years, 67 days	Resigned
Nancy Wyman (1946–2026)		Connecticut	Democratic	January 5, 2011	January 9, 2019	8 years, 4 days	Retired
Mary Taylor (born 1966)		Ohio	Republican	January 10, 2011	January 14, 2019	8 years, 4 days	Retired to run for the Republican nomination in 2018 (defeated in primary)
Sheila Simon (born 1961)		Illinois	Democratic	January 10, 2011	January 12, 2015	4 years, 2 days	Retired to run as the Democratic nominee for Illinois Comptroller in 2014 (defeated)
Kim Reynolds (born 1959)		Iowa	Republican	January 14, 2011	May 24, 2017	6 years, 130 days	Became Governor of Iowa (2017–present)
Kay Ivey (born 1944)		Alabama	Republican	January 17, 2011	April 10, 2017	6 years, 83 days	Became Governor of Alabama (2017–present)
Sue Ellspermann (born 1960)		Indiana	Republican	January 14, 2013	March 2, 2016	3 years, 48 days	Resigned
Angela McLean (born 1970)		Montana	Democratic	February 17, 2014	January 3, 2016	1 year, 320 days	Resigned
Crit Luallen (born 1952)		Kentucky	Democratic	November 13, 2014	December 8, 2015	1 year, 25 days	Retired
Kathy Hochul (born 1958)		New York	Democratic	January 1, 2015	August 23, 2021	6 years, 234 days	Became Governor of New York (2021–present) (Note: Previously served as the U.S. representative from New York 26th (2011–2013))
Tina Smith (born 1958)		Minnesota	Democratic (DFL)	January 5, 2015	January 2, 2018	2 years, 362 days	Resigned to become U.S. senator from Minnesota (2018–present)
Karyn Polito (born 1966)		Massachusetts	Republican	January 8, 2015	January 5, 2023	7 years, 362 days	Retired
Evelyn Sanguinetti (born 1970)		Illinois	Republican	January 12, 2015	January 14, 2019	4 years, 2 days	Lost reelection
Jenean Hampton (born 1958)		Kentucky	Republican	December 8, 2015	December 10, 2019	4 years, 2 days	Retired
Donna Lynne (born 1953)		Colorado	Democratic	May 12, 2016	January 8, 2019	2 years, 241 days	Retired to run for the Democratic nomination in 2018 (defeated in primary)
Suzanne Crouch (born 1952)		Indiana	Republican	January 9, 2017	January 13, 2025	8 years, 4 days	Retired to run for the Republican Nomination for Governor in 2024 (defeated in primary)
Bethany Hall-Long (born 1963)		Delaware	Democratic	January 17, 2017	January 7, 2025	7 years, 356 days	Term-limited and ran for the Democratic nomination for governor in 2024 (defeated in primary); Became Governor of Delaware (January 7–21, 2025)
Michelle Fischbach (born 1965)		Minnesota	Republican	January 3, 2018	January 7, 2019	1 year, 4 days	Retired (Note: Later served as the U.S. representative from Minnesota 7th (2021–present))
Sheila Oliver (1952–2023)		New Jersey	Democratic	January 16, 2018	August 1, 2023	5 years, 197 days	Died
Valerie Davidson (born 1967)		Alaska	Independent	October 16, 2018	December 3, 2018	48 days	Retired
Janice McGeachin (born 1963)		Idaho	Republican	January 7, 2019	January 2, 2023	3 years, 361 days	Retired to run for the Republican nomination in 2022 (defeated in primary)
Peggy Flanagan (born 1979)		Minnesota	Democratic (DFL)	January 7, 2019	Incumbent	7 years, 313 days	Serving
Eleni Kounalakis (born 1966)		California	Democratic	January 7, 2019	Incumbent	7 years, 313 days	Serving
Kate Marshall (born 1959)		Nevada	Democratic	January 7, 2019	September 17, 2021	2 years, 253 days	Resigned to serve as Senior Advisor to Governors in the White House Office of Intergovernmental Affairs
Jeanette Núñez (born 1972)		Florida	Republican	January 8, 2019	February 16, 2025	6 years, 39 days	Resigned to serve as Interim President of Florida International University
Dianne Primavera (born 1950)		Colorado	Democratic	January 8, 2019	Incumbent	7 years, 312 days	Serving
Susan Bysiewicz (born 1961)		Connecticut	Democratic	January 9, 2019	Incumbent	7 years, 311 days	Serving
Pamela Evette (born 1967)		South Carolina	Republican	January 9, 2019	Incumbent	7 years, 311 days	Serving
Juliana Stratton (born 1965)		Illinois	Democratic	January 14, 2019	Incumbent	7 years, 306 days	Serving
Jacqueline Coleman (born 1982)		Kentucky	Democratic	December 10, 2019	Incumbent	6 years, 341 days	Serving
Deidre Henderson (born 1974)		Utah	Republican	January 4, 2021	Incumbent	5 years, 316 days	Serving
Kristen Juras (born 1955)		Montana	Republican	January 4, 2021	Incumbent	5 years, 316 days	Serving
Molly Gray (born 1984)		Vermont	Democratic	January 7, 2021	January 5, 2023	1 year, 363 days	Retired to run for the Democratic nomination for the U.S. House of Representatives (defeated in primary)
Sabina Matos (born 1974)		Rhode Island	Democratic	April 14, 2021	Incumbent	5 years, 216 days	Serving
Andrea Stewart-Cousins (born 1950)		New York	Democratic	August 24, 2021	September 9, 2021	16 days	New lieutenant governor appointed
Andrea Stewart-Cousins (born 1950)		New York	Democratic	April 12, 2022	May 25, 2022	43 days	New lieutenant governor appointed
Lisa Cano Burkhead (born 1971)		Nevada	Democratic	December 16, 2021	January 2, 2023	1 year, 17 days	Lost reelection
Winsome Earle-Sears (born 1964)		Virginia	Republican	January 15, 2022	January 17, 2026	4 years, 2 days	Retired to run as the Republican nominee for governor in 2025 (defeated)
Nancy Dahlstrom (born 1957)		Alaska	Republican	December 5, 2022	Incumbent	3 years, 346 days	Serving
Sylvia Luke (born 1967)		Hawaii	Democratic	December 5, 2022	Incumbent	3 years, 346 days	Serving
Tammy Miller (born 1960)		North Dakota	Republican	January 3, 2023	December 15, 2024	1 year, 347 days	Retired to run for the Republican nomination for governor in 2024 (defeated in primary)
Sara Rodriguez (born 1975)		Wisconsin	Democratic	January 3, 2023	Incumbent	3 years, 317 days	Serving
Kim Ward (born 1955/1956)		Pennsylvania	Republican	January 3, 2023	January 17, 2023	14 days	New lieutenant governor sworn in
Kim Driscoll (born 1966)		Massachusetts	Democratic	January 5, 2023	Incumbent	3 years, 315 days	Serving
Leslie Rutledge (born 1976)		Arkansas	Republican	January 10, 2023	Incumbent	3 years, 310 days	Serving
Aruna Miller (born 1964)		Maryland	Democratic	January 18, 2023	Incumbent	3 years, 302 days	Serving
Tahesha Way (born 1971/1972)		New Jersey	Democratic	September 8, 2023	January 20, 2026	2 years, 134 days	Retired
Amy Sinclair (born 1975)		Iowa	Republican	September 3, 2024	December 16, 2024	104 days	New lieutenant governor sworn in
Michelle Strinden (born 1968/1969)		North Dakota	Republican	December 15, 2024	Incumbent	1 year, 336 days	Serving
Chris Cournoyer (born 1970)		Iowa	Republican	December 16, 2024	Incumbent	1 year, 335 days	Serving
Rachel Hunt (born 1965)		North Carolina	Democratic	January 1, 2025	Incumbent	1 year, 319 days	Serving
Kyle Evans Gay (born 1986)		Delaware	Democratic	January 21, 2025	Incumbent	1 year, 299 days	Serving
Ghazala Hashmi (born 1964)		Virginia	Democratic	January 17, 2026	Incumbent	303 days	Serving
Shirley Emehelu (born 1978/1979)		New Jersey	Democratic	November 9, 2026	Incumbent	7 days	Serving

=== Lieutenant governors-elect ===
Image	Name (lifespan)	State	Term start	Term end	Party	Notes	Departure	Time in office	Ref
	Winnie Brinks (born 1968)	Michigan	January 1, 2027		Democratic		Elect		
	Stephanie Garcia Richard (born 1974 or 1975)	New Mexico	January 1, 2027		Democratic		Elect		
	Adrienne Adams (born 1960)	(New York (state)) New York	January 1, 2027		Democratic		Elect		
	Molly Gray (born 1984)	Vermont	January 1, 2027		Democratic		Elect		
	Sandra Jauregui (born 1983)	Nevada	January 4, 2027		Democratic		Elect		
	Sarah Godlewski (born 1981)	Wisconsin	January 4, 2027		Democratic		Elect		
	Fiona Ma (born 1966)	California	January 7, 2027		Democratic		Elect		
	Lesley Dahlkemper (born 19??)	Colorado	January 11, 2027		Democratic		Elect		
	Vikki Goodwin (born 1967)	Texas	January 19, 2027		Democratic		Elect		

== List of female secretaries of state ==
Certain states do not have a lieutenant governor; instead, they have a secretary of state next in line for succession of governor.

Denotes incumbent secretary of state
- Italics denotes acting secretary of state.

Name	Image	State	Party	Mandate start	Mandate end	Term length	Notes
Thyra Thomson (1916–2013)		Wyoming	Republican	January 7, 1963	January 5, 1987	23 years, 363 days	Retired
Norma Paulus (1933–2019)		Oregon	Republican	January 3, 1977	January 7, 1985	8 years, 4 days	Retired to run as the Republican nominee for governor in 1986 (defeated)
Rose Mofford (1922–2016)		Arizona	Democratic	October 20, 1977	April 4, 1988	10 years, 167 days	Succeeded as governor upon the impeachment and conviction of Governor Evan Mecham
Barbara Roberts (born 1936)		Oregon	Democratic	January 7, 1985	January 14, 1991	6 years, 7 days	Retired to run as the Democratic nominee for governor in 1990 (elected)
Kathy Karpan (1942–2025)		Wyoming	Democratic	January 5, 1987	January 3, 1995	7 years, 363 days	Retired to run as the Democratic nominee for governor in 1994 (defeated)
Sila María Calderón (born 1942)		Puerto Rico	Democratic	1988	1989	1 year	Retired
Diana Ohman (born 1950)		Wyoming	Republican	January 3, 1995	January 3, 1999	4 years, 0 days	Retired
Jane Dee Hull (1935–2020)		Arizona	Republican	January 2, 1995	September 5, 1997	2 years, 246 days	Succeeded as governor upon the resignation of Governor Fife Symington
Norma Burgos (born 1954)		Puerto Rico	Democratic	1995	1999	4 years	Retired to become a member of the Puerto Rico Senate
Betsey Bayless (born 1944)		Arizona	Republican	September 5, 1997	January 6, 2003	5 years, 123 days	Retired to run for governor in 2002 (defeated in primary)
Jan Brewer (born 1944)		Arizona	Republican	January 6, 2003	January 21, 2009	6 years, 15 days	Succeeded as governor upon resignation of Governor Janet Napolitano
Marisara Pont Marchese (born 1941)		Puerto Rico	Democratic	2005	2005	5 months	Retired
Kate Brown (born 1960)		Oregon	Democratic	January 5, 2009	February 18, 2015	6 years, 44 days	Succeeded as governor upon the resignation of Governor John Kitzhaber
Michele Reagan (born 1969)		Arizona	Republican	January 5, 2015	January 7, 2019	4 years, 2 days	Lost renomination
Jeanne Atkins (born 1949/1950)		Oregon	Democratic	March 11, 2015	January 2, 2017	1 year, 297 days	Retired
Karen Wheeler		Wyoming	Republican	February 9, 2018	March 1, 2018	20 days	Acting period ended
Katie Hobbs (born 1969)		Arizona	Democratic	January 7, 2019	January 2, 2023	3 years, 360 days	Retired to run as the Democratic nominee for governor in 2022 (elected)
Leslie Cummings		Oregon	Republican	February 26, 2019	March 31, 2019	33 days	Acting period ended
Beverly Clarno (born 1936)		Oregon	Republican	March 31, 2019	January 4, 2021	1 year, 279 days	Retired
María Marcano de León		Puerto Rico		August 4, 2019	December 19, 2019	137 days	Acting period ended
Shemia Fagan (born 1981)		Oregon	Democratic	January 4, 2021	May 8, 2023	2 years, 124 days	Resigned
Cheryl Myers		Oregon	Democratic	May 8, 2023	June 30, 2023	53 days	Acting period ended
LaVonne Griffin-Valade (born 1952/1953)		Oregon	Democratic	June 30, 2023	January 6, 2025	1 year, 190 days	Appointment ended
Verónica Ferraiuoli (born 1971)		Puerto Rico	Democratic	January 2, 2025	April 27, 2025	115 days	Resigned
Narel Colón		Puerto Rico	Republican	April 27, 2025	June 9, 2025	43 days	Acting period ended
Rosachely Rivera (born 1980)		Puerto Rico	Democratic	June 9, 2025	Incumbent	1 year, 160 days	Serving

== List of female Senate presidents ==
Two states – Maine and New Hampshire – do not have a lieutenant governor, and do not have the secretary of state as first in the line of succession to the governor. In these two states, the president of the state senate is first in line to succeed the governor.

denotes incumbent Senate president.
- Italics denotes acting Senate president.

Name	Image	State	Party	Mandate start	Mandate end	Term length	Notes
Vesta M. Roy (1925–2002)		New Hampshire	Republican	December 1, 1982	December 3, 1986	4 years, 2 days	Served as Acting Governor of New Hampshire from December 29, 1982, to January 6, 1983. Retired
Beverly Hollingworth (born 1935)		New Hampshire	Democratic	August 26, 1999	December 6, 2000	1 year, 102 days	Party lost Senate majority
Beverly Daggett (1945–2015)		Maine	Democratic	December 4, 2002	December 1, 2004	1 year, 363 days	Term-limited from the Senate
Beth Edmonds (born 1950)		Maine	Democratic	December 1, 2004	December 3, 2008	4 years, 2 days	Term-limited from the Senate
Sylvia Larsen (born 1949)		New Hampshire	Democratic	December 5, 2006	December 1, 2010	3 years, 361 days	Party lost Senate majority
Libby Mitchell (born 1940)		Maine	Democratic	December 3, 2008	December 1, 2010	1 year, 363 days	Retired to run as the Democratic nominee for governor in 2010(defeated)
Donna Soucy (born 1967)		New Hampshire	Democratic	December 5, 2018	December 2, 2020	1 year, 363 days	Party lost Senate majority
Mattie Daughtry (born 1987)		Maine	Democratic	December 4, 2024	Incumbent	1 year, 347 days	Serving
Sharon Carson (born 1957)		New Hampshire	Republican	December 4, 2024	Incumbent	1 year, 347 days	Serving

== List of female federal district council chairs ==
In the District of Columbia, the chairman of the Council of the District of Columbia is first in line of succession in the event of a vacancy in the office of mayor of the District of Columbia.

Name	Image	State	Party	Mandate start	Mandate end	Term length	Notes
Linda W. Cropp (born 1947)		District of Columbia	Democratic	1997	2007	10 years	Named acting Chair of D.C. Council, following the death of David A. Clarke in 1997. Elected D.C. Council Chair in the 1997 special election. Retired to run as the Democratic nominee for Mayor in 2006 (defeated)

== Concurrently serving female governors and lieutenant governors ==
State	Governor	Party	Lieutenant governor	Party	Term start	Term end	Notes
Massachusetts	Maura Healey	Democratic	Kim Driscoll	Democratic	January 5, 2023	Serving	
Arkansas	Sarah Huckabee Sanders	Republican	Leslie Rutledge	Republican	January 10, 2023	Serving	
Iowa	Kim Reynolds	Republican	Chris Cournoyer	Republican	December 16, 2024	Serving	Appointed to fill a vacancy caused by the resignation of Adam Gregg
Virginia	Abigail Spanberger	Democratic	Ghazala Hashmi	Democratic	January 17, 2026	Serving	
New Jersey	Mikie Sherrill	Democratic	Shirley Emehelu	Democratic	November 9, 2026	Serving	Appointed to fill a vacancy caused by the resignation of Dale Caldwell
Michigan	Jocelyn Benson	Democratic	Winnie Brinks	Democratic	January 1, 2027		
New Mexico	Deb Haaland	Democratic	Stephanie Garcia Richard	Democratic	January 1, 2027		
New York	Kathy Hochul	Democratic	Adrienne Adams	Democratic	January 1, 2027		
Rhode Island	Helena Foulkes	Democratic	Sabina Matos	Democratic	January 4, 2027		
Texas	Gina Hinojosa	Democratic	Vikki Goodwin	Democratic	January 19, 2027		

== See also ==
- List of female governors in the United States
