= Puerto Rico gubernatorial line of succession =

Process overview
- Formed: Ad hoc after the governor is unable to perform his functions
- Jurisdiction: Executive branch
- Headquarters: Office of the Governor
- Key documents: Law No. 7 of 1952; Article IV of the Constitution of Puerto Rico; Law No. 7 of 2005

The Puerto Rico gubernatorial line of succession defines who may become or act as governor of Puerto Rico upon the incapacity, death, resignation, or removal from office, by impeachment and subsequent conviction, of an incumbent governor or a governor-elect.

Article IV of the Constitution of Puerto Rico establishes that when a vacancy occurs in the post of governor said post shall devolve upon the secretary of state, who shall hold it for the rest of the term and until a new governor has been elected and qualifies. In the event that vacancies exist at the same time in both the post of governor and that of secretary of state, the law establishes a line of succession upon the secretaries. This line of succession is established by Law No. 7 of 2005.

In the event that the governor-elect does not qualify, or a permanent vacancy occurs in the office of governor before the governor-elect shall have appointed a secretary of state, or before said secretary, having been appointed, shall have qualified, the Legislative Assembly just elected elects a governor who shall hold office until his successor is elected in the next general election and qualifies.

With regard to a temporary vacancy in the office of governor, such as the governor's absence due to travel away from Puerto Rico and the absence of the secretary of state, the line of temporary succession is not affected by the age of the temporary successor or serving in a recess appointment capacity. In those cases, for example, Secretary of Justice Rafael Hernández Colón, for example, could have served as temporary successor to Governor Roberto Sánchez Vilella should the secretary of state also be absent, even though he was under 35 years of age. Likewise, Secretary of State Marisara Pont Marchese, during her recess appointment, served in 2005 as acting governor during Governor Aníbal Acevedo Vilá's absences.

In the case of Secretary of State Pedro Pierluisi, the Puerto Rico Supreme Court, in a 9–0 decision, determined that he could not ascend to the governorship when Ricardo Rosselló resigned because he held the position in a recess appointment capacity and was therefore precluded from being in the line of permanent succession to the governorship.

The Constitution establishes that the governor of Puerto Rico has to be at least 35 years old to serve.

== Current order ==
The table below shows the current governmental line of succession as established by Article IV of the Constitution of Puerto Rico and further defined by Law No. 7 of 2005. However, those in the line of succession must still satisfy the constitutional requirements for the office of governor in order to serve. In the table, the absence of a number in the first column indicates that the incumbent is ineligible, either because the incumbent holds a recess appointment or does not have the minimum age.

No.	Office	Incumbent (since 2025)
1	Secretary of State	Rosachely Rivera Santana
2	Secretary of Justice	Lourdes Gómez Torres
3	Secretary of Treasury	Ángel Pantoja Rodríguez
4	Secretary of Education	Eliezer Ramos Parés
5	Secretary of Labor and Human Resources	María Del Pilar Vélez Casanova
6	Secretary of Transportation and Public Works	Ángel Cruz Nolasco
7	Secretary of Economic Development and Commerce	Sebastián Negrón Reichard
8	Secretary of Health	Víctor Ramos Otero

== See also ==
- Telegramgate
