= Francisco Domenech =

Puerto Rican politician

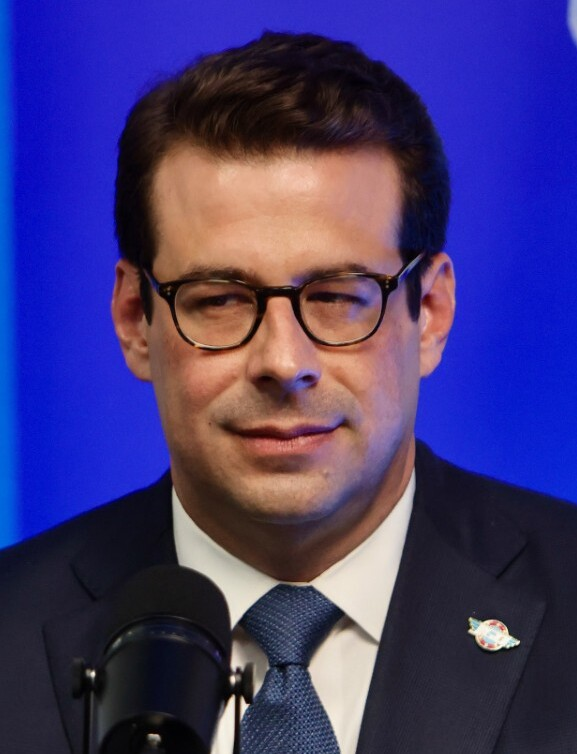
- Domenech in 2024

21st Chief of Staff of Puerto Rico
- In office January 2, 2025 – August 7, 2026
- Governor: Jenniffer González-Colón
- Succeeded by: Norma Burgos

4th Executive Director of the Puerto Rico Fiscal Agency and Financial Advisory Authority
- In office January 2, 2025 – August 7, 2026
- Governor: Jenniffer González-Colón
- Succeeded by: Vicky González-Vega (Acting)

16th Director of the Puerto Rico Office of Legislative Services
- In office July 10, 2005 – December 31, 2008

Personal details
- Born: Francisco Javier Domenech; April 29, 1978 (age 48) San Juan, Puerto Rico
- Party: New Progressive Party
- Other political affiliations: Democratic
- Spouse: Veronica Ferraiuoli
- Education: University of Puerto Rico (BA); University of Puerto Rico School of Law (JD)
- Occupation: Attorney, Lobbyist, Political Campaign Manager, Investor and Entrepreneur

Francisco J. Domenech (born April 29, 1978) is a Puerto Rican attorney, politician, lobbyist and professional campaign manager who served as Chief of Staff of Puerto Rico, as well as the executive director of the Puerto Rico Fiscal Agency and Financial Advisory Authority from January 2, 2025 until August 7, 2026, being subsequently succeeded by Norma Burgos. He is a former director of the Office of Legislative Services of Puerto Rico (2005–2008). Domenech spent part of his childhood and adolescent years in Ocala, Florida, having attended Blessed Trinity Catholic School, and Forest High School.

Domenech served as the Chairman of the Boards of Directors of the Puerto Rico Fiscal Agency and Financial Advisory Authority (AAFAF), the Puerto Rico Infrastructure Financing Authority (AFI, its Spanish acronym), the Puerto Rico Economic Development Bank (BDE, its Spanish acronym) and the Puerto Rico Public Private Partnership Authority (P3A). He also served as the President of the Government Development Bank for Puerto Rico (BGF, its Spanish acronym) and was appointed to the Board of Directors of the University of Puerto Rico, the Automobile Accidents Compensation Administration (ACAA, for its Spanish acronym), the Puerto Rico Ports Authority, the State Insurance Fund Corporation(CFSE, for its Spanish acronym), and to the Board of Trustees of the Museum of Art of Puerto Rico.

He is the only individual in Puerto Rico's governmental history to concurrently occupy the roles of Chief of Staff, Executive Director of AAFAF, and President of the GDB, as well as the multiple boards the Governor appointed to chair or to serve in. No prior Chief of Staff had previously held that level of influence in the Government of Puerto Rico, which allowed him to successfully execute Governor González-Colón's public policies and government platform.

== DNC Superdelegate and Democratic Party conventions ==
Domenech was a delegate to four (4) Democratic National Conventions in 2004, 2008, 2012, and 2016. By virtue of the position he held for more than five (5) years in the Democratic National Committee, representing the Young Democrats of America (YDA), as their Democratic National Committeeman, he was a Superdelegate to the 2008 and 2012 Conventions. During the 2004 Convention, Domenech served as one of the whips for the Puerto Rico Delegation. During the 2016 Puerto Rico Democratic primary campaign, Domenech was Hillary Clinton's top fundraiser in the U.S. territory and attended his fourth consecutive Democratic National Convention, after being elected as a Delegate representing his Bayamón Senatorial District.

== Political career ==
Francisco Domenech has been considered by political analyst as the most successful manager of Island-wide campaigns in Puerto Rico's history, with a record of 7-0 wins. Since 2008, he has contributed his management, strategic, and political skills to the overwhelming victories of female candidates in presidential, gubernatorial, and congressional primaries, and in congressional elections. Primarily working for Hillary Clinton and Jenniffer González Colón.

In 2008 and 2016, Domenech served as the campaign manager in Puerto Rico for Hillary Clinton's primary campaign for the Democratic presidential nomination. Clinton overwhelmingly won both of these primaries, with 68% of the vote in 2008 (to Barack Obama's 32%) and with 62% of the vote in 2016 (to Bernie Sanders' 38%).

In 2015- 2016, Domenech served as campaign manager for Jenniffer González Colón’s historic primary and election campaigns for Resident Commissioner of Puerto Rico non-voting seat in Congress. In the primaries, González Colón beat her opponent, former gubernatorial candidate Carlos I. Pesquera, 71% to 29%, securing the NPP's nomination for Resident Commissioner in the general elections. Her running mate, future governor Ricardo Rosselló barely beat his opponent, future governor Pedro Pierluisi, 51% to 49%. That year, González Colón went on to secure the congressional seat in the general elections, garnering the most votes of any other candidate in the election. On November 8, 2016, and after 15 months of campaigning, Domenech successfully led a campaign team that made history by electing the first woman in 115 years since the Resident Commissioner position had been created back in 1902, and youngest person to represent Puerto Rico in the U.S. Congress.

During the 2019-2020 election cycle, which redefined all the rules for running a political campaign due to the impact of COVID-19 Mr. Domenech once again served as Congresswoman González's campaign manager for her re-election bid to another four (4) year term as Puerto Rico's Resident Commissioner in Congress. Ms. González comfortably defeated her four (4) opponents, winning her re-election by 41.18% of the vote, with a 9% lead over closest opponent. She also achieved the most votes out of any candidates running for any elected office on the Island.

Jenniffer Gonzalez and Francisco Domenech during a December 20, 2023, press conference announcing him as her campaign manager

In 2024, Jenniffer González Colón for the third time entrusted Domenech with the management of her primary campaign to become the NPP's candidate for governor in the November 5, 2024, general elections. Her successful primary campaign was particularly challenging since she ran against an incumbent elected governor from her own party, Pedro Pierluisi, who held a 5-to-2 financial advantage and, as president of the NPP, controlled the political machinery of the party. Consistent with the polling throughout the primary campaign, González Colón comfortably prevailed over the incumbent governor by a 10-point margin, beating him in 7 of the 8 senatorial districts and in 62 of the 78 municipalities, thus becoming the first female candidate for governor for the NPP in the party's history and the first person to ever defeat an elected incumbent governor from her own political party. For nine (9) months Domenech led a small team of experienced political operatives, using new and innovative political campaign tactics, to arguably achieve the biggest political upset in Puerto Rico history.

During his tenure as campaign manager for Jenniffer González-Colón's gubernatorial bid, Domenech designed a campaign structure that was representative of key sectors of Puerto Rican society. The campaign relied on various sectors drawn from diverse communities to lead volunteer structures, coordinate get-out-the-vote operations, serve as spokespersons, and help draft the government platform. These sectors included faith-based communities, the private sector (small and medium-sized businesses, and industry leaders), special needs communities, youth, senior citizens, women, and organized labor, among others. Each sector was tasked with driving recruitment, shaping policy discussions, and aligning campaign messaging with the priorities of their constituencies. The approach underscored González's emphasis on addressing community concerns, such as generational challenges facing youth, the growing needs of the elderly, gender inequality, and the importance of advocating in favor of the rights of people with disabilities.

On November 5, González Colón handedly won the governorship by an over 9% margin of victory against four (4) opponents, thus becoming only the second woman in Puerto Rico's history to be elected as Governor, and the first woman elected to such position from the NPP. She also helped carry her Party to achieve overwhelming majorities in both houses of the local legislature.

In the political sphere, Domenech has always been an ardent supporter of admitting Puerto Rico as the 51st state of the United States. During his early political career, in May 2003, he became the founding President of the Puerto Rico Young Democrats (PRYD). During his tenure as President of the PRYD's, Domenech led a team of 14 young Puerto Rican professionals in Central Florida that campaigned for several weeks for the Kerry/Edwards ticket. He also volunteered extensively during 2003–2004 in former Gov. Pedro Rosselló's gubernatorial campaign, both in island-wide political organizing, as well as platform and opposition research activities. In November 2004, Domenech also organized and hosted YDA's Fall National meeting in San Juan, Puerto Rico. Domenech then was elected as a national officer of YDA in 2005 as vice president for Development and on July 21, 2007 became a member of the DNC, when YDA's national convention elected him as its Democratic National Committeeman. In 2010 he was reelected for his third and last term as YDA's Democratic National Committeeman before he aged out of the youth organization. During the last years of his active participation in YDA, Domenech was a co-founder of the YDA Hispanic Caucus. Domenech is the only person in the history of the Young Democrats of America to have served as a national officer for seven (7) consecutive years, two (2) years as a vice president and five years (5) as Democratic National Committeeman.

Following in the footsteps of many Democratic leaders, such as the young Hillary Clinton who registered Hispanics in Southwest Texas in the 70's, Domenech led voter registration drives aimed at potential Puerto Rican voters in Florida's I-4 Corridor in several election cycles between 2004 and 2010, staffed by YDA Puerto Rico chapter volunteers.

In December 2007, Domenech was appointed by Senator Hillary Clinton to co-chair her presidential campaign's Hillblazers, a national network of young professionals and students. He also served as Deputy State Coordinator of Sen. Clinton's successful primary campaign in Puerto Rico, where she polled a 68–32 margin over Sen. Obama in the June 1, 2008 Puerto Rico Democratic primary, 2008.

Domenech served as one of the national co-finance chairs of Ready for Hillary, and coordinated fundraisers for the super PAC in and out of Puerto Rico, from California to Washington, D.C. He served on the National Finance Committee for Hillary Clinton presidential campaign, 2016, was her top fundraising bundler from Puerto Rico, assisted in organizing her first campaign trip to Puerto Rico in the current election cycle, which took place on September 4, 2015. He additionally served as the campaign manager for her successful primary camping in Puerto Rico, where she polled a 61–37, margin of victory over Sen. Sanders in the June 5, 2016 Puerto Rico Democratic primary, 2016.

== Professional & Gubernatorial Career ==
While practicing law at the age of 27, Domenech argued on behalf of the Puerto Rico Senate before a relatively rare en banc hearing of the United States Court of Appeals for the First Circuit in the case of Igartúa De La Rosa v. United States of America. He has also appeared before Puerto Rico's Supreme Court, as well as its Court of Appeals.

In 2005 he was appointed jointly by Senate of Puerto Rico President Kenneth McClintock and Puerto Rico House of Representatives Speaker José Aponte as Director of the Office of Legislative Services of Puerto Rico. The local legislative equivalent of the United States Congress' Congressional Research Service with a staff of about 120 and a budget of $10 million. During his tenure, he streamlined the staff, expanded the Office's Tomás Bonilla Legislative Library, including access to the blind and the physically handicapped, operated a hundred-intern summer program three consecutive years, and turned budget surpluses during four consecutive fiscal years.

In early 2013, the Puerto Rico Supreme Court in Domenech Fernández v. Integration Corporate Services, et al ruled unanimously in his favor in a case arising from a shareholders' dispute within the firm for which he had previously worked. In the Supreme Court's Opinion, in which the Court for the first time interprets Puerto Rico's 2009 Corporations Law, it ruled that whenever fraud or irregularities are alleged in the keeping of a corporation's records, as Domenech alleged, evidence extraneous to the corporate records will be admitted.

In 2010 he founded and managed until December 2024 Politank*, Corp. a bipartisan government affairs firm in Puerto Rico which has represented Fortune 100 and 500 clients, and which hired Puerto Rico's former Secretary of State and Senate President Kenneth McClintock and at one point Guillermo San Antonio-Acha, former Legal Counsel to the Governor during Governor Aníbal Acevedo Vilá's administration and who served from late 2014 until early 2017 as the Popular Democratic Party of Puerto Rico (PPD) Electoral Commissioner.

He managed three (3) successful presidential campaigns within the Puerto Rico Physicians Association, the statutorily created organization to which the islands' approximately 11,000 physicians mandatorily belong, to elect in 2014, reelect in 2016, and again reelect in 2018 the organization's current president, Dr. Víctor Ramos. The reelection of Ramos on April 10, 2016, resulted in a majority of 71.6% in a three-way race. The third re-election of Dr. Ramos, led by Domenech, took place on April 22, 2018, by another comfortable margin of 67% of all the votes cast. It was an even more historical feat than his two prior victories led by Domenech, because in the 25 years of the Colegio Médico's existence, no one candidate had ever been elected three (3) times to its presidency.

Since January 2025, Domenech has served a dual leadership role as the Chief of Staff of Puerto Rico's Government and the executive director of the Puerto Rico Fiscal Agency and Financial Advisory Authority (AAFAF). In this role he acts as the principal advisor to Governor Jenniffer González Colón and is entrusted with supervising the daily operations of the entire Executive Branch, including coordinating the Constitutional Cabinet and all public agencies.

In his capacity as Chief of Staff, he has managed the government's portfolio of complex negotiations, maintaining high-level involvement in critical areas such as energy and overseeing the state budget.

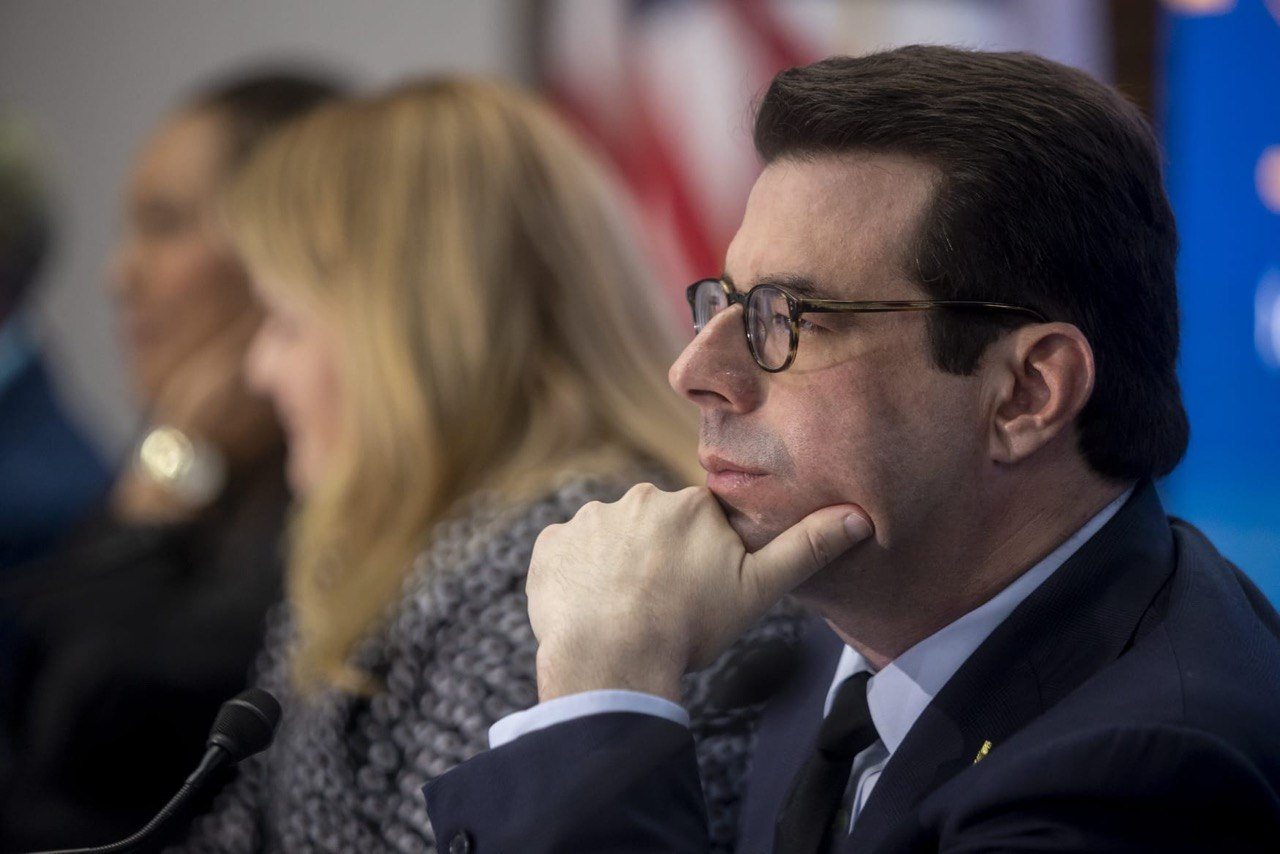
Domenech during a Government Emergency Preparedness Meeting (2026)

Concurrently, as the head of AAFAF, he is responsible for overseeing Puerto Rico's fiscal and financial affairs. Under his leadership, AAFAF secured historic savings in professional services contracts and successfully hosted the Puerto Rico In Focus Investment Summit, which, for the first time, convened the presidents and CEOs of the Island's major banks on a single panel to discuss Puerto Rico's current financial position and highlight the Island's progress and growing financial stability.

Additionally, Domenech serves as the government's primary representative interacting on a daily basis with the Financial Oversight and management board (FOMB) to navigate and resolve ongoing fiscal affairs.

== Philanthropy ==
Mr. Domenech has actively supported through years various philanthropic endeavors. These include: Clinton Foundation Congressional Hispanic Caucus Institute Museum of Art of Puerto Rico Museo de Arte de Ponce The Washington Center for Internships and Academic Seminars Hispanic Heritage Foundation the TASIS Dorado Scholarship Fund Puerto Rico Food Bank Fundación Fondo de Acceso a la Justicia Inc Rabito Kontento Santuario de Animales San Francisco de Asis

== Education ==
A twice graduate of the University of Puerto Rico, Río Piedras campus, (UPR) first in 1999 when he obtained his Bachelor of Arts degree in political science, and then in 2003 when he obtained his Juris Doctor degree from the University of Puerto Rico School of Law. During his years at UPR, Domenech was President of the General Student Body Council during the 1999–2000 academic year, a position that had never been held by a statehooder before or since him. During that same year he also served as an Academic Senator before the UPR Río Piedras campus Academic Senate. Prior to that, from 1998 to 1999, Domenech was UPR's College of Social Sciences Student Body President.

Academically, Domenech was a twice participant (2002 & 2003) in the international rounds of the Philip C. Jessup International Law Moot Court Competition on behalf of UPR's School of Law. He ranked in the top 15% of oralists.

== Family ==
He is the great-grandnephew of Manuel V. Domenech, an engineer, who was a member of the first Puerto Rico House of Representatives after the Spanish–American War of 1898, and was reelected in 1902 and 1904. During 1904 he served as Mayor for the city of Ponce, Puerto Rico. In 1914 he was appointed to serve as Commissioner of the Interior, becoming one of the first Puerto Ricans to hold an officer's position in the Cabinet which was appointed by the President of the United States. Also, he was later appointed as Treasurer of Puerto Rico serving in this capacity from 1930 to 1935. Unlike his great-grandnephew, Manuel Domenech was a very active member of the Republican Party of Puerto Rico attending the 1928 Republican National Convention as an alternate delegate.

Domenech is also second cousin of the former Commonwealth of Virginia's Secretary of Natural Resources, Douglas Domenech who served in the Bush Administration as Deputy Chief of Staff for the United States Department of the Interior and who also served as Assistant Secretary for Insular Affairs of the United States Department of the Interior under the Trump Administration.
