= Ferraiuoli =

Ferraiuoli is a surname. Notable people with the surname include:

- Nunzio Ferraiuoli (1661–1735), Italian painter
- Verónica Ferraiuoli, Puerto Rican politician and lawyer
