= Carmen Pola =

American politician and activist (1939–2025)

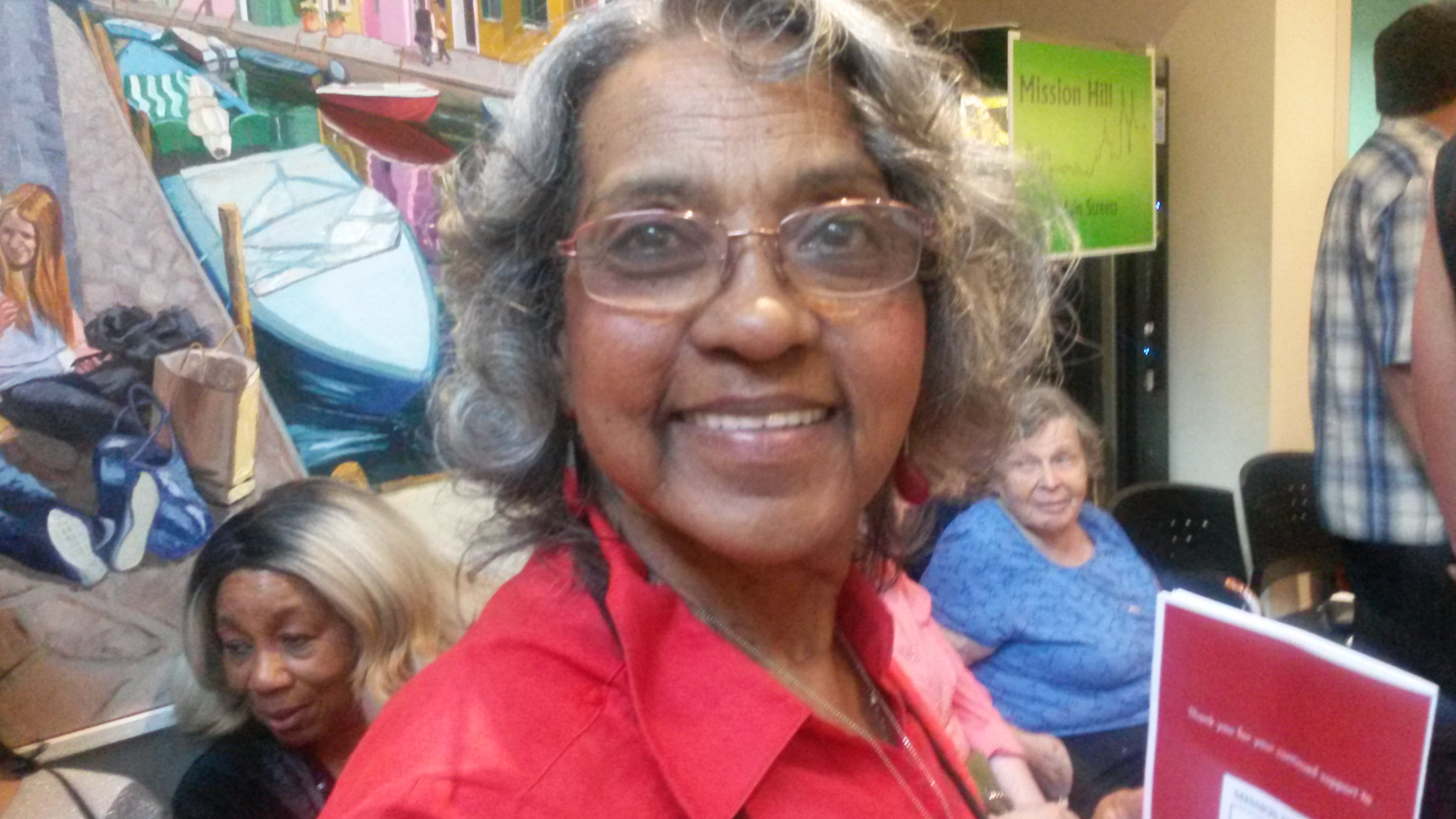
- Pola in 2016

Personal details
- Born: Carmen Aurora Pola; May 1, 1939 Rio Piedras, Puerto Rico
- Died: June 1, 2025 (aged 86) Boston, Massachusetts, U.S.
- Spouse(s): Juan Pola (m. 1961–2012)
- Children: five children
- Education: University of Puerto Rico; Merritt College; Tufts University

Carmen Pola (May 1, 1939 – June 1, 2025) was a Puerto Rican politician and community activist in Boston, Massachusetts. She was the first Latina to run for statewide office and the first Director of the Office of Constituent Services, a citywide office formed under Mayor Raymond Flynn.

== Early life and education ==
Carmen Aurora Villanueva Garcia was born in Río Piedras, Puerto Rico in 1939. Pola attended the University of Puerto Rico from 1954–55, before immigrating to The Bronx, New York in 1955 and later to Oakland, California. She reported that "As a young, poor migrant farm worker in the late 1950s, Carmen Pola sometimes went to bed with no dinner." In Oakland, she attended Merritt College and participated in organizations such as the Young Catholic Workers and St. Mary's Church. She also married Juan Pola in 1961 and had five children. They eventually moved to Mission Hill, Boston in 1971. She completed an undergraduate degree and did work toward a master's degree in Urban and Environmental Policy from Tufts University.

== Political career ==
Pola’s political career began in California, where she participated in various grassroots organizations such as La Raza Educators and Young Catholic Workers. After moving to Boston in 1972, she became involved in her neighborhood of Mission Hill. After achieving success in community activism in her neighborhood, Pola became the first Latina woman to run for statewide office in Massachusetts.

In 1980, Pola ran for State Representative against Kevin W. Fitzgerald, losing by less than 80 votes. Although she was not elected, this set the stage for later political appointments and brought a higher profile to Latino/a politics in the state. "I see it," she said at the time, "as a campaign that will open the door. It says that we are here and we're not going anywhere."

== Appointment to Constituent Services Coordinator ==
In 1983, Boston Mayor-Elect Raymond L. Flynn appointed Pola to the post of Constituent Services Coordinator. The position was newly created and “designed to respond to the individual concerns of Boston residents... [and] help people find the services they need.” For example, Pola helped coordinate responses to the city's "No-Heat" phone call line in the mid-1980s.

As part of that office, she focused on expanding access to local government, not only through answering constituent concerns but also external programs like voter registration drives.

== Post Constituent Services Coordinator ==
After leaving Boston’s city government, Pola returned to community-based activism and worked at various levels within and outside of government through the 1990s. She helped found Roxbury Unites for Families and Children, La Raza en Marcha, and the Spanish Cultural Program on Mental Health, and was involved with numerous non–profit organizations. She also continued to hold local political appointments, such as the chair of the Ethnic Linguistic Minorities Committee, vice chair of the Mayor's Committee on Hispanic Affairs. Besides official appointments, Pola continued to be a member of the Citywide Coordinating Council on Education and Manpower Training Act Advisory Council.

== Later work ==
In April 2013, Pola gave a talk on her recent interview and oral history work at the Mission Hill Senior Legacy Project as part of TEDxFenway. The event focused on the ecology of great cities and explored the cultural, technological forces, and leaders that contribute to a neighborhood and city as a whole. She continued this oral history work in 2019. She served on Community Benefits Advisory Committee of the New England Baptist Hospital, which recently was combined with two other hospitals.

== Death ==
Pola died on June 1, 2025, at the age of 86.

== Awards ==
- 2012 Andrus Award for Community Service
- On June 22, 2016, Carmen Pola was awarded the 2016 Mission Hill Main Streets "Community Treasure" Award at the Annual Awards Dinner of the Mission Hill Main Streets.

== See also ==
- Ethnic interest groups in the United States
- Ethnic studies
- Oral history
- Puerto Rico Young Democrats
