= Ferdinand Mercado =

Puerto Rican politician (born 1957)

Ferdinand Mercado Ramos

Secretary of State of Puerto Rico
- In office January 2, 2001 – October 8, 2004
- Governor: Sila María Calderón
- Preceded by: Angel Morey
- Succeeded by: Jose Izquierdo Encarnacion

Personal details
- Born: June 18, 1957 (age 68); Lares, Puerto Rico
- Education: University of Puerto Rico (BS); Interamerican University of Puerto Rico School of Law (JD); Complutense University of Madrid (Ph.D.)

Ferdinand Mercado Ramos (born June 18, 1957) is a former Secretary of the Puerto Rico Department of State under Governor Sila Calderón from 2001 until 2004. His government service ended after Gov. Calderón appointed him as Chief Justice of the Supreme Court of Puerto Rico and his nomination was later withdrawn when it became apparent that he would not be confirmed by the Senate of Puerto Rico.

Bachelor of Science in Psychology, University of Puerto Rico, 1978. Juris Doctor, Interamerican University of Puerto Rico School of Law, 1981 and a Ph.D., Complutense University of Madrid.

Was appointed District judge in 1992 and later judge administrator. He was president of the Puerto Rico Judiciary Association from 1995 till 1997.

Mercado is one of the few Puerto Ricans who have ample, high level experience in the three branches of state government. He served as a legislative assistant, executive director of the House Government Affairs Committee and Secretary of the House of Representatives. In the judicial branch, he served as a district court judge and as president of the Puerto Rico Judicature Association.

An accomplished poet whose works have been published in several books, Mercado currently practices law and was a prominent political analyst for the Notiuno radio network in Puerto Rico. He is married and has two children.

== Works ==
- Grito a la intimidad
- El gobierno del alma
- Pensamientos de estado

Political offices
Preceded by Angel Morey	Secretary of State of Puerto Rico; 2001–2004	Succeeded by Jose Izquierdo Encarnacion
