= Víctor Manuel Ortiz =

Puerto Rican politician (1965–2021)

Mayor of Gurabo
- In office 14 January 2005 – 7 December 2016
- Preceded by: José A. Rivera
- Succeeded by: Rosachely Rivera

Personal details
- Born: 31 January 1965
- Died: 3 November 2021 (aged 56)
- Party: New Progressive Party (PNP)
- Education: University of Puerto Rico at Humacao (BBA)

Víctor Manuel "Manolito" Ortiz Díaz (31 January 1965 – 3 November 2021) was a Puerto Rican politician and former mayor of Gurabo. Ortiz was affiliated with the New Progressive Party (PNP) and served as mayor from 2005 to 2016. Has BBA degree in business administration from the University of Puerto Rico at Humacao.

On 7 December 2016, Ortiz was arrested for charges related to extortion and soliciting a bribe. He was suspended and later fired from his post as mayor. He was succeeded by Rosachely Rivera Santana.

Ortiz died on 3 November 2021. He was buried at Del Pilar Gurabo Municipal Cemetery #1 in Gurabo, Puerto Rico.
