= Puerto Rico Young Democrats =

Non-profit political corporation

The Young Democrats of America Puerto Rico Chapter is a non-profit political corporation organized pursuant to General Corporate Law of Puerto Rico and duly registered in the Department of State of Puerto Rico.

The organization is the official chapter of the U.S. Commonwealth of Puerto Rico certified by the Young Democrats of America (YDA) and the Democratic Party of the Commonwealth of Puerto Rico (DPCPR). Its premier purposes are promoting Puerto Rican youth involvement and activism within the United States Democratic Party and representing the island at all YDA national meetings and conventions.

== History ==
The Young Democrats of Puerto Rico (YDPR) was founded in 2003 by Francisco Domenech a year before the 2004 United States Presidential election between John Kerry and George W. Bush. Amid increased participation of young people on the island and their desire to play a larger role in the national political process, a team of fifteen Puerto Rican young democrats traveled to Florida in the winter of 2004 to campaign for John Kerry.

A month after the 2004 election, the Young Democrats of America's national winter meeting was held in San Juan, Puerto Rico, during which hundreds of young liberals from across the entire nation met to regroup and restrategize after Senator John Kerry lost the 2004 presidential election.

The organization subsequently increased its membership by executing multiple membership recruitment initiatives targeting local colleges and universities in the territory. This led to the creation of the award-winning YDPR College Tour in October 2010. Since then, YDPR have visited numerous college campuses across the island spreading the Democratic Party message and the importance of youth involvement in the national political debate.

Recognized Puerto Rican Democratic leaders such as Secretary of State Kenneth D. McClintock, former Governor Pedro Rosselló, Ricardo Rosselló and the Chairman of the Democratic Party of Puerto Rico, Roberto Prats have participated as guest speakers at the college visits.

In 2008, the chapter actively participated in the Democratic Party primaries between Senator Hillary Clinton and President Barack Obama where its members volunteered on both campaigns.

In October 2010, a group of the organization's leadership once again traveled to central Florida to campaign for democratic candidates in the 2010 United States congressional mid term elections. During a span of ten days, the Puerto Rican young democrats volunteered through canvassing, phone banking and mobilizing the Hispanic vote for Congressman Alan Grayson and Gubernatorial candidate Alex Sink.

In July 2011, YDPR were presented with the "YDA Ongoing Event of the Year Award" as a result of the organization's YDPR College Tour initiative at the Young Democrats of America (YDA) National Convention in Louisville, Kentucky.

In 2011, Phillip Arroyo was elected to a second term as State President. The organization played a key role during President Obama's visit to the island.

In 2012, YDPR played an important role for the creation of the YDA Hispanic Caucus. In 2012, YDPR President Phillip Arroyo became the first chair of the newly created caucus. Since 2015, Anthony Carrillo, former YDPR National Committeeman, has served as its chair.

Ricardo Alfaro was elected YDPR State President on August 14, 2013. After the 2014 midterm elections, the YDA once again celebrated its national winter meeting in San Juan, Puerto Rico. The meeting included the participation of Governor Alejandro García Padilla, Resident Commissioner Pedro Pierluisi, Puerto Rico Senate President Eduardo Bhatia, the Chairman of the Democratic Party of Puerto Rico Roberto Prats, and YDPR founder Francisco Domenech.

On August 23, 2015, the organization won its second national award by the YDA after receiving the Franklin D. Roosevelt Chapter of the Year Award in Los Angeles, California.

On July 16, 2015, the Young Democrats celebrated one of the most highly attended assemblies in its history with over 200 active members. It was the first time that a closed ballot system was used for the election of the 2015–2017 board. After a highly contested election, Ramón Ortiz won.

On October 1, 2016, Melissa Marzán became acting president after the resignation of Ramón Ortiz.

== 2023-2025 ==
Name	Office
Aurelio Agelviz	President
Alexandra M. Meléndez Iturrino	Vice President
Gabriela Firpi	National Committeewoman
Adriel Jared Vélez Torres	National Committeeman
Yarleen González Peña	Treasurer
Marino Puello Rivera	Secretary

== 2021-2023 ==
Name	Office
Elisa Muñoz	President
Manuel Velez	Vice President
Gabriela Medina	National Committeewoman
Simón Carlo	National Committeeman
José Roa	Treasurer
Aurelio Agelviz	Secretary

YDA Puerto Rico Chapter membership elects six state officers biannually at the organization's Convention. The President, National Committeeman, and National Committeewoman are automatic members of the Young Democrats National Committee.

== Presidents ==
President	Term	Puerto Rico Status Affiliation
Aurelio Agelviz	2023–Current	Statehood
Elisa Muñoz	2021–2023	Statehood
Luis Augusto Martínez	2019–2021	Statehood
Fernando Sánchez	2017–2019	Statehood
Melissa Marzán	2016–2017	Commonwealth
Ramón Ortiz	2015–2016	Commonwealth
Ricardo Alfaro	2013–2015	Commonwealth
Phillip Arroyo	2009–2013	Statehood
Luis Caraballo	2007–2009	Statehood
Miguel Hernandez Vivoni	2005–2007	Statehood
Francisco Domenech	2003–2005	Statehood
