= Reinaldo Paniagua Diez =

American politician (1934–2021)

Member of the Puerto Rico Senate from the at-large district
- In office 1985–1989

Secretary of State of Puerto Rico
- In office 1977-1979
- Governor: Carlos Romero Barceló
- Preceded by: Juan A. Albors
- Succeeded by: Pedro Vázquez

Personal details
- Born: July 20, 1934 Santurce, Puerto Rico
- Died: January 29, 2021 (aged 86) Syracuse, New York
- Party: New Progressive Party
- Education: University of Puerto Rico (BA); University of Puerto Rico School of Law (JD)
- Profession: Politician

Reinaldo Paniagua Diez (July 20, 1934 – January 29, 2021) was a Puerto Rican politician who was the Puerto Rico Secretary of State from January 2, 1977, to 1979, under Governor Carlos Romero Barceló and served as acting Governor whenever the governor was traveling. He had previously been Romero-Barceló's campaign manager during the 1976 gubernatorial campaign. Reinaldo Paniagua Diez was owned the Caribbean winter baseball team, Santurce Cangrejeros from 1976 to 2002.

Paniagua was born on July 20, 1934, to Rita Diez and Reinaldo Paniagua. He died on January 29, 2021, of natural causes.
