= Carlos S. Quirós =

Puerto Rican Secretary of State

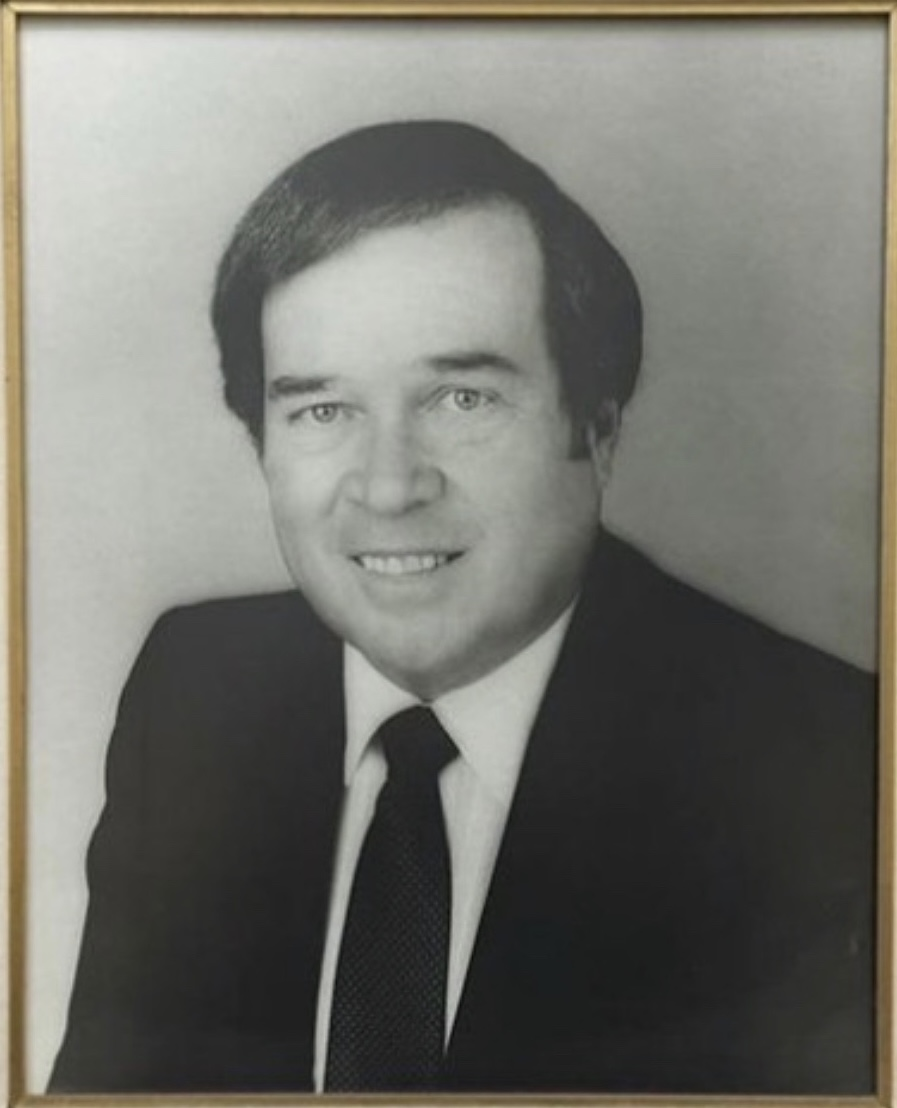

Secretary of State of Puerto Rico
- In office 1981–1985
- Governor: Carlos Romero Barceló
- Preceded by: Pedro Vázquez
- Succeeded by: Héctor Luis Acevedo

Personal details
- Born: November 20, 1932 Yauco, Puerto Rico
- Died: January 23, 2022 (aged 89) Tampa, Florida
- Resting place: Puerto Rico National Cemetery
- Party: New Progressive Party
- Other political affiliations: Republican
- Spouse: Nancy Mendez
- Education: University of Puerto Rico (MPA)

Military service
- Allegiance: United States of America
- Branch/service: United States Army
- Rank: Captain

Carlos Samuel Quirós Vázquez (November 20, 1932 – January 23, 2022), He was a former Puerto Rico government official who served as Secretary of State from 1981 through 1985.

Quirós attended elementary school at Escuela Labra in Santurce, Puerto Rico. He was an active member of the YMCA in old San Juan during his adolescent years, where in 1948 and 1949 he was selected to be captain of an intramural basketball team. Two years later, in 1950, he was drafted into a soccer team to represent Puerto Rico in the Caribbean and Central American games.

Quiros served in the United States Army during the Korean War. After his time in service, he returned to Puerto Rico to finish his master's degree in public administration from the University of Puerto Rico in Río Piedras, Puerto Rico and he worked as a consultant in Central America for a private consulting firm.

In 1968 he accepted a position as executive assistant to the newly elected mayor of San Juan, Carlos Romero Barcelo. He served for 8 years as executive assistant and deputy mayor. When Mayor Romero resigned to assume the governorship on January 2, 1977, he became Mayor of San Juan for a week, until Mayor-elect Hernán Padilla's term began. In 1976 Quirós was appointed by then Governor-elect Romero as secretary of the Department of Labor, a position he did not get sworn into until his brief term as Mayor of San Juan ended in early January, 1977. Under Governor Romero, he also served as Secretary of State from 1981 until 1985. As Secretary of State, he was responsible for major restoration of the Royal Treasury Building and the Provincial Deputation Building, which became the Department of State headquarters in late 1984. He never actually moved into the facilities when he turned over the keys to incoming secretary of state Héctor Luis Acevedo.

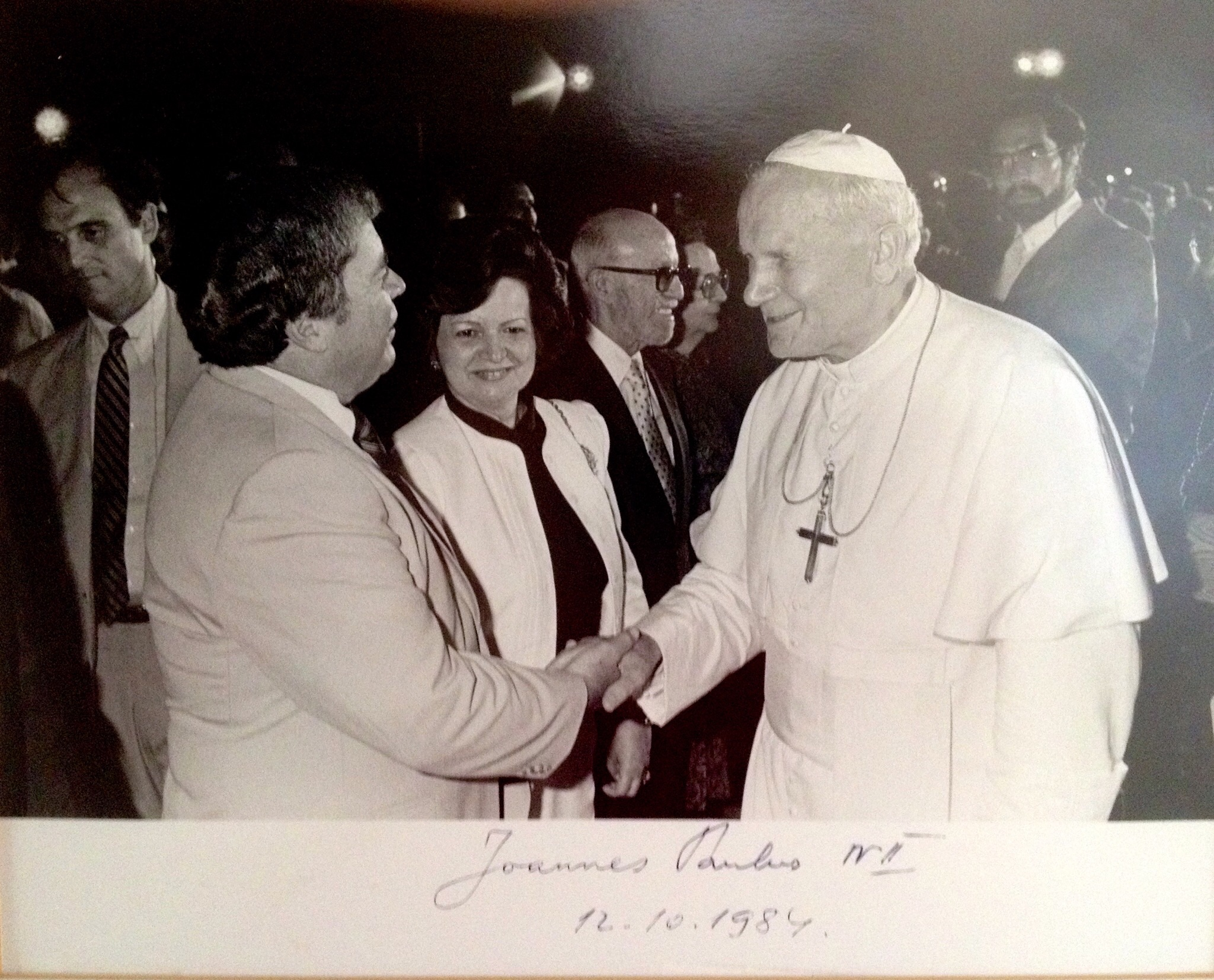
Carlos S. Quiros and Pope John Paul II in 1984

After leaving public office, he and his wife Nancy moved to the state of Florida. He came out of retirement when he was appointed by President George H. W. Bush as a director at the United States Agency for International Development in Washington, DC.

After serving in the federal government for three years, he again retired to Florida with his wife, Nancy. He became a widower in December 2011.

In June, 2012, he visited the State Department, where he was welcomed by then secretary Kenneth McClintock and San Juan City Hall, where he was welcomed by then mayor Jorge Santini.

Carlos died on January 23, 2022, in Tampa, Florida, after a battle with Alzheimer's disease. He is survived by his three sons Carlos, Nelson, and Marvin Samuel. He was interred at Puerto Rico National Cemetery on March 11, 2022.

Political offices
Preceded by Pedro Vázquez	Secretary of State of Puerto Rico; 1981–1985	Succeeded by Héctor Luis Acevedo
