= Pedro Vázquez (politician) =

Puerto Rican politician

Secretary of State of Puerto Rico
- In office 1979–1981
- Governor: Carlos Romero Barceló
- Preceded by: Reinaldo Paniagua
- Succeeded by: Carlos S. Quirós

Personal details
- Born: December 16, 1934 San Juan, Puerto Rico
- Died: June 23, 2011 (aged 76) San Juan, Puerto Rico
- Resting place: Puerto Rico National Cemetery
- Party: New Progressive Party
- Other political affiliations: Democratic
- Spouse: Carmen Iris Alsina
- Education: United States Naval Academy (BS)

Military service
- Allegiance: United States of America
- Branch/service: United States Marine Corps
- Rank: Captain

Pedro Rafael Vázquez Rivera (December 16, 1934 – June 23, 2011), served as Puerto Rico's Secretary of State from 1979 to 1981 under Governor Carlos Romero Barceló, Deputy Mayor of San Juan, Puerto Rico from 1984 to 1988 under Mayor Baltasar Corrada del Rio and Executive Director of the publicly owned Puerto Rico Electric Power Authority (PREPA) from 1977 to 1979. He was an attorney and engineer.

== Public life ==
Graduated from the United States Naval Academy in 1957, he served in the United States Marines Corps during the late 1950s and early 1960s. During the Lyndon B. Johnson administration, he served as Deputy Counsel and General Counsel of the United States Department of Commerce. He served in multiple public sector roles at the Federal, state and municipal level, in addition to practicing law, serving as president of the now-defunct El Mundo newspaper and working as a developer and project manager.

During his stint as PREPA's Executive Director, the authority went through one of its most difficult strikes.

As Secretary of State, he not only headed Puerto Rico's Department of State, but fulfilled the role of Lieutenant Governor, serving as Acting Governor whenever Gov. Romero was off the island. Served as Secretary of State of Puerto Rico until his resignation in 1981.

== Private life ==
Born on December 16, 1934, Vázquez died on June 23, 2011, at the age of 76. He was married to the former Carmen Iris Alsina and had three daughters and a son, several grandchildren and great-grandchildren. A veteran of the U.S. Marine Corps, he was interred at the Puerto Rico National Cemetery in Bayamón, Puerto Rico where he was eulogized by his successor, current Secretary of State Kenneth McClintock. Flags flew at half-staff for three days in his honor after his death.

Political offices
| Preceded by Reinaldo Paniagua | Secretary of State of Puerto Rico; 1979–1981 | Succeeded by Carlos S. Quirós |
