= Secretary of State of Puerto Rico =

Government of Puerto Rico

- Official seal

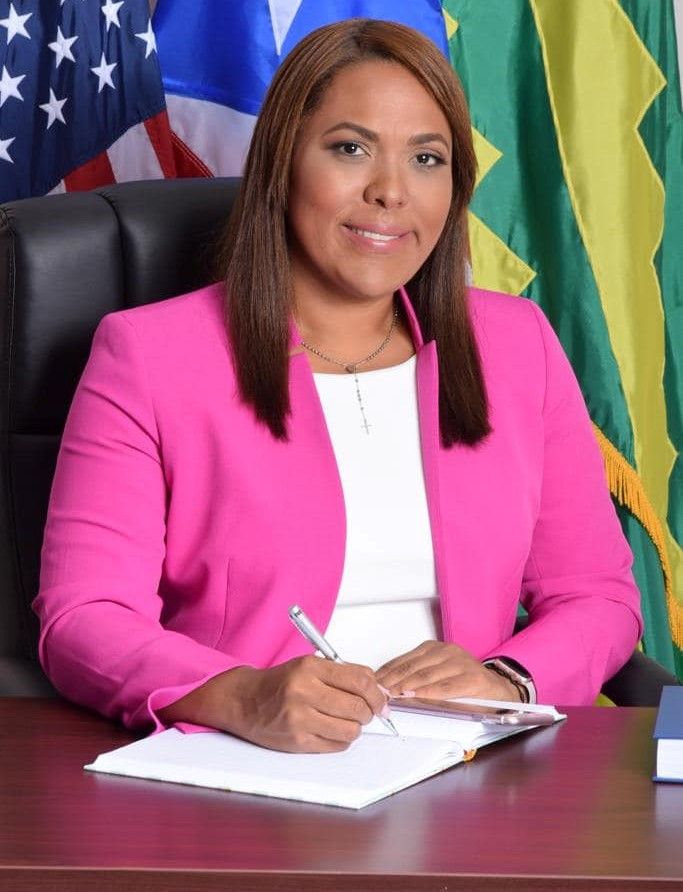
- Incumbent; Rosachely Rivera since July 3, 2025
- Department of State
- Nominator: Governor
- Appointer: Governor with advice and consent from the Senate and House of Representatives
- Term length: At the pleasure of the governor
- Formation: Established by Article IV of the Constitution of Puerto Rico
- Succession: First
- Salary: $90,000 (set by statute) USD
- Website: www.estado.pr.gov

The secretary of state of Puerto Rico (Spanish: Secretario de Estado de Puerto Rico) leads all efforts promoting the cultural, political, and economical relations between Puerto Rico and jurisdictions within the United States or foreign countries. It was created by Article IV of the Constitution of Puerto Rico, establishing the secretary as acting governor when the governor is unable to perform their duties—a post equivalent to that of a lieutenant governor. As such, the secretary of state is first in line of succession to the governorship of Puerto Rico.

Today, the post is similar to that of a foreign minister. The secretary is the officer in charge of Puerto Rico's foreign relations, albeit under the consent of Congress or the U.S. Department of State due to Puerto Rico's political status.

Administratively, the post differs to other similar titles in U.S. politics. Namely, that in contrast to lieutenant governors, the secretary is not elected by the people. They are instead appointed by the governor with advice and consent from both the Senate and House of Representatives. In addition, the secretary does not have any role whatsoever in the state legislature, in contrast to lieutenant governors. Unlike secretaries of state in other U.S. jurisdictions, the secretary of state of Puerto Rico does not take part in the elections process. That responsibility falls into the State Commission on Elections.

Yet, the post does have some similarities to other U.S. secretaries of state. For example, the secretary of state of Puerto Rico is also the chief clerk of the commonwealth and the primary custodian of important records. The secretary promulgates all Puerto Rican laws after the governor signs them and keeps records of them online and offline. They also keeps record of business charters, professional licenses, trademarks, and other documents. Civil acts like marriage licenses, birth certificates, and adoption and divorce decrees, however, are kept in record by the Department of Health of Puerto Rico. Other historical documents are kept in the General Archives of Puerto Rico, a program of the Institute of Puerto Rican Culture.

In summary, the secretary of state of Puerto Rico is, by law, the chief clerk, the acting governor, and the officer in charge of the commonwealth's foreign relations. Because of these responsibilities, the post is typically occupied by a highly competent individual with some degree of experience, starting with Roberto Sánchez Vilella in 1952. This cadre has led citizens and politicians alike to hold secretaries of state in high esteem regardless of their political affiliation.

== Appointment and gubernatorial succession ==
The secretary of state is first in line to exercise the role of acting governor when the governor of Puerto Rico is temporarily unavailable, whether because of being away from Puerto Rico or due to another temporary incapacity. The secretary of state is the only official who can automatically become governor if the elected governor is permanently incapable of remaining in office due to death, resignation, or conviction as part of an impeachment process. Prior to the adoption of the local constitution, the Foraker Act of 1900 and the Jones-Shafroth Act of 1917 provided for the position of executive secretary, who carried out the roles assigned to contemporary secretaries of state.

Since 1952, secretaries of state have been appointed by the governor, subject to the advice and consent of both the Senate of Puerto Rico and the House of Representatives of Puerto Rico. A secretary of state appointed by the governor while the legislative assembly is in recess may take office as a recess appointment and serve until the nomination is rejected by any of the legislative chambers or the next legislative regular session ends, whichever happens first.

== Additional delegated duties ==
Secretaries of state of the United States Commonwealth of Puerto Rico, in addition to heading the State Department, one of the smallest central government agencies, and exercising the role as the territory's lieutenant governor, are usually assigned additional functions by the governor. For example, Gov. Luis Muñoz Marín had Secretary of State Roberto Sánchez Vilella, a civil engineer, serve simultaneously as Secretary of Public Works. Gov. Pedro Rosselló had Secretary of State Norma Burgos serve for several years as chair of the Puerto Rico Planning Board. Gov. Aníbal Acevedo Vilá's second secretary of state, Fernando Bonilla, also served as executive director of the Puerto Rico Ports Authority. However, perhaps no other secretary of state has been assigned more tasks than former Secretary of State Kenneth McClintock, who served as chair of the incoming Fortuño administration's Incoming Committee on Government Transition, coordinated the government's digital TV transition work group, headed the state government's Census 2010 team, chaired the government's 2010 Central and Caribbean Games Coordinating Committee, was tasked with making the final awards of Public-Private Partnership contracts, chaired the Government Reorganization Committee and chaired the Outgoing Transition Committee, among other assignments delegated by Gov. Luis Fortuño. Governor Alejandro García Padilla put his first appointee, secretary Bernier in charge of evaluating the Luis Muñoz Marín International Airport Public-Private Partnership contract and overseeing social agencies, such as the Health, Family Services, Education and Sports and Recreation departments. He has appointed current Secretary Suárez as chairman of his administration's fiscal team, a role he played previously as Chief of Staff to the Governor.

The secretary of state of Puerto Rico is a member of the National Association of Secretaries of State, as well as the National Lieutenant Governors Association in his dual role as head of Puerto Rico's Department of State, as well as the islands' lieutenant governor.

Traditionally, gubernatorial inaugural ceremonies are initiated by the outgoing administration's secretary of state who, prior to the ceremonial swearing-in of the new governor, will turn over the master of ceremonies role to the secretary of state–designate, symbolizing the orderly transition from one administration to another.

== Turn-over ==
Secretaries of state of Puerto Rico, once confirmed by both houses of the Legislature, do not serve for a fixed term but at the pleasure of the governor. Over 68 years, the U.S. territory has had 30 individuals serve in that position, for an average 2.2 years in service. However, if the 12-year term of the first secretary, Gov. Muñoz-Marín's only one is not taken into account, the average length of Sec. Sánchez-Vilella's successors falls to only 1.8 years.

After Sánchez-Vilella's 12 years in office, Puerto Rico's second-longest serving secretary of state was Norma Burgos under Gov. Pedro Rosselló, with Gov. Luis Ferré's sole appointee, Sec. Chardón, and Gov. Luis Fortuño's sole appointee, Sec. McClintock, tying for third longest serving.

== List of secretaries ==
Image	Name	Assumed office	Left office	Party	Affiliation
	Roberto Sánchez Vilella	1952	1964	PPD	Democratic
	Carlos J. Lastra	1965	1966	PPD	Democratic
	Guillermo Irizarry	1966	1969	PPD	Democratic
	Carlos Fernando Chardón	1969	1973	PNP	Republican
	Víctor Pons	1973	1974	PPD	Democratic
	Juan A. Albors	1975	1977	PPD	Democratic
	Reinaldo Paniagua Diez	1977	1979	PNP	Democratic
	Pedro R. Vazquez	1979	1981	PNP	Democratic
	Carlos S. Quirós	1981	1985	PNP	Republican
	Héctor Luis Acevedo	1985	1988	PPD	Democratic
	Alfonso Lopez Chaar	1988	1988	PPD	Democratic
	Sila María Calderón	1988	1990	PPD	Democratic
	Antonio J. Colorado	1990	1992	PPD	Democratic
	Salvador M. Padilla Escabi	1992	1992	PPD	Democratic
	Baltasar Corrada del Rio	1993	1995	PNP	Republican
	Norma Burgos	1995	1999	PNP	Republican
	Angel Morey	1999	2001	PNP	Democratic
	Ferdinand Mercado	January 2, 2001	October 8, 2004	PPD	Democratic
	Jose Izquierdo Encarnacion	October 8, 2004	January 2, 2005	PPD	Democratic
	Marisara Pont Marchese	January 2, 2005	March 1, 2005	PPD	Democratic
	Fernando J. Bonilla	March 2005	January 2, 2009	PPD	Democratic
	Kenneth D. McClintock	January 2, 2009	January 2, 2013	PNP	Democratic
	David Bernier	January 2, 2013	October 30, 2015	PPD	Democratic
	Víctor Suárez Meléndez (Note: Javier González served as acting secretary of state after Bernie's resignation and until Suárez' appointment.)	November 1, 2015	January 2, 2017	PPD	Democratic
	Luis G. Rivera Marín	January 2, 2017	July 16, 2019	PNP	Republican
	Pedro Pierluisi	July 31, 2019	August 2, 2019	PNP	Democratic
	María Marcano de León	August 4, 2019	December 19, 2019	PNP	Democratic
	Elmer Román (Note: Position remained vacant until Román's appointment.)	December 20, 2019	August 23, 2020	PNP	Republican
	Raúl Márquez Hernández	August 30, 2020	January 2, 2021	PNP	Republican
	Larry Seilhamer Rodríguez	January 2, 2021	May 25, 2021	PNP	Republican
	Félix Rivera Torres; Acting Secretary	May 25, 2021	July 12, 2021	PNP	Independent
	Omar Marrero	July 12, 2021	January 2, 2025	PNP	Independent
	Verónica Ferraiuoli; Acting	January 2, 2025	April 27, 2025	PNP	Democratic
	Narel Colón; Acting	April 27, 2025	July 3, 2025	PNP	Republican
	Rosachely Rivera	July 3, 2025	Incumbent	PNP	Democratic
