= Angel Morey =

Puerto Rican politician

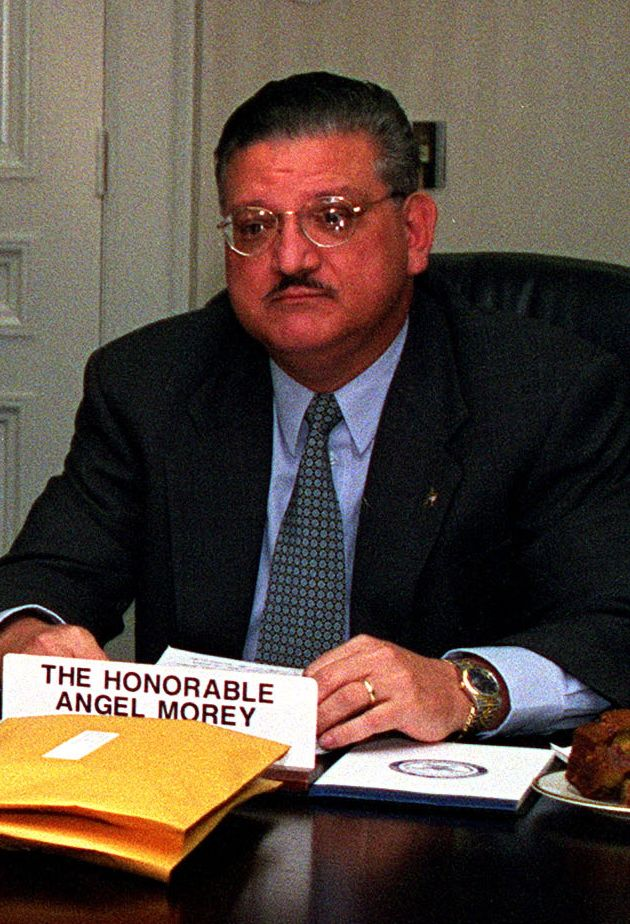

Secretary of State of Puerto Rico
- In office 1999–2001
- Governor: Pedro Rosselló
- Preceded by: Norma Burgos
- Succeeded by: Ferdinand Mercado

Angel Morey Santiago is an American politician who served as chief of staff to Puerto Rico governor Pedro Rosselló, from 1995 to 2001. He also served as Rosselló's third and last Secretary of State from 1999 to 2001, appointed after Norma Burgos resigned, following her nomination as candidate for Senator-at large. He was also the president of the Puerto Rico Chamber of Commerce from 1993 to 1994.

A businessman and lifelong personal friend of the Governor, he returned to the private sector after his six years stint in public service. He is a member of Phi Sigma Alpha fraternity. He is the father of current legislator Ángel Morey Noble.
