= Jose Izquierdo Encarnacion =

19th Secretary of State of Puerto Rico

Secretary of State of Puerto Rico
- In office 2004–2005
- Governor: Aníbal Acevedo Vilá
- Preceded by: Marisara Pont Marchese
- Succeeded by: Fernando Bonilla

Secretary of Transportation and Public Works of Puerto Rico
- In office 2001–2002
- Governor: Sila Calderón

Personal details
- Born: October 6, 1957 (age 68) Río Piedras, Puerto Rico
- Party: Popular Democratic Party
- Other political affiliations: Democratic
- Education: University of Puerto Rico at Mayagüez (BE, ME)

José Miguel “Pepe” Izquierdo Encarnación (born October 6, 1957) served as the Secretary of State of the Commonwealth of Puerto Rico.

A structural engineer by education and profession, he has served in many professional, civic and public organizations. Formerly the Secretary of State and Secretary of Transportation and Public Works for the Commonwealth of Puerto Rico, he is now Principal of PORTICUS, a consulting firm located in Rio Piedras, Puerto Rico.

== Biography ==
José (Pepe) Izquierdo received his bachelor's and master's degrees in civil engineering from the University of Puerto Rico at Mayagüez. He joined Capacete-Martin & Associates, Architects and Engineers in San Juan in 1980. Pepe served as a Senior Structural Engineer for the firm for 5 years. He founded (1986) and worked for 15 years in the consulting firm Izquierdo, Rueda and Associates that provided services in the areas of Structural Engineers, infrastructure development and historic preservation.

He has led the structural engineering continuous education program in Puerto Rico for the last 25 years. He has written many papers and spoken extensively on structural engineering and analysis in over 15 countries, promoted the use of simplified methods for structural design and has worked in numerous restoration projects.

He has served as president (1994–1996) and board member of the College of Engineers and Land Surveyors of Puerto Rico. During his 27 years of service to the Institute he has served in numerous committees, Code, Earthquake, Dimension Magazine, Tecnomundo Periodical, Design Built Special Committee, Treasury and Special Activities. He served as President of the Institute of Civil Engineers and San Juan Chapter

He has specialized as an expert witness for structural engineering and in the design of complex structures and historic preservation projects. In addition has served as a member of the jury of the Cemex Building Award since 2007.

He was appointed by Puerto Rico Governor Sila Calderón as the 19th Secretary of State of the Commonwealth of Puerto Rico, following the resignation of Secretary of State Ferdinand Mercado, he served simultaneously as the United States Commonwealth's Secretary of Transportation and Public Works (2001–2002). His term as Secretary of State ended on January 2, 2005, when he was succeeded by Marisara Pont Marchese, appointed by Governor Aníbal Acevedo Vilá.

Izquierdo was the 2003–2004 president of the American Concrete Institute. He has a long and distinguished record of service to ACI International. He is an Honorary Member of the Institute, a member of ACI Committee 314 on Simplified Concrete Design chairing the review of IPS-1, 118-Use of Computers, 369-Seismic Repair and Rehabilitation, 375-Performance-based Design of Concrete Buildings for Wind Loads, and E 705-Educational Computer Activities. Pepe also has serves on the Educational Activities Committee, Financial Advisory Committee, Hot Topic Committee, TAC Metrication Committee, and the Task Group on Centennial Activities. He was the co-chair of the local committee for the ACI Fall Convention in 1992 in Puerto Rico, co-chair of the ACI Fall Convention 2007 in Puerto Rico and is a former president and board member of the Puerto Rico Chapter. Boy Scouts of America – Puerto Rico Council Distinguish Citizen 2017.

He has been very active in many civic organizations as well, serving as board member and vice president of the Puerto Rico Chamber of Commerce, Trustee of the Pontifical Catholic University of Puerto Rico and chairman and member of the board of trustees of the Technological College of San Juan.

He has been chairman of the board of several public corporations in Puerto Rico, Corporation for the Development of the Capital City of San Juan, Highway and Transportation Authority, Ports Authority, Metropolitan Bus Authority, Puerto Rico Aqueduct and Sewer Authority, Puerto Rico Electric Power Authority, Public Building Authority and the board of trustees of the Puerto Rico One Billion dollar Trust funds for Special Communities.

Political offices
Preceded by Marisara Pont Marchese	Secretary of State of Puerto Rico; 2004–2005	Succeeded by Fernando Bonilla
