= Verónica Ferraiuoli =

Puerto Rican politician, policymaker and attorney

Veronica Ferraiuoli
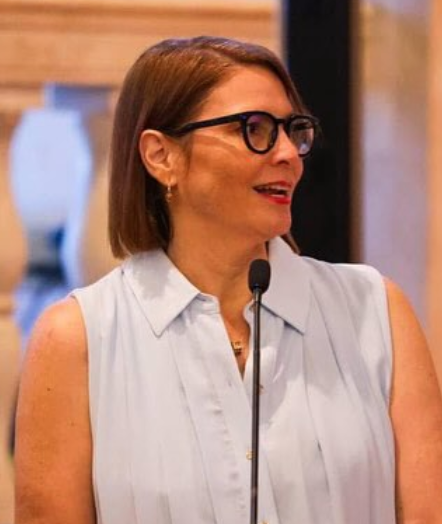

Efficiency Coordinator of the Government of Puerto Rico
- Incumbent
- Assumed office May 2, 2025
- Governor: Jenniffer González
- Preceded by: Office established

Executive Director of the Puerto Rico Convention District Authority
- Incumbent
- Assumed office January 15, 2025
- Governor: Jenniffer González
- Preceded by: Mariela Vallines Fernández

Secretary of State of Puerto Rico
- In office January 2, 2025 – April 27, 2025
- Governor: Jenniffer González
- Preceded by: Omar J. Marrero
- Succeeded by: Rosachely Rivera

Personal details
- Born: December 3, 1971 (age 54) San Germán, Puerto Rico
- Party: New Progressive
- Other political affiliations: Democratic
- Spouse: Francisco Domenech
- Education: Johns Hopkins University (B.L.A.); Boston University School of Law (J.D.); Interamerican University of Puerto Rico School of Law (LL.M.)

Veronica Ferraiuoli Hornedo (born December 3, 1971) is a Puerto Rican politician, policymaker, and attorney who served as Secretary of State of Puerto Rico under Governor Jenniffer González-Colón from January to April 2025. She currently serves as the Efficiency Coordinator of the Government of Puerto Rico by leading the Initiative for Deregulation and Efficient Administration (IDEA), and is the Executive Director of the Puerto Rico Convention District Authority.

Ferraiuoli previously served as the Deputy Chief of Staff and Legal Counsel at the office of Resident Commissioner of Puerto Rico Jenniffer González-Colón, Puerto Rico's sole representative in the United States Congress. During González-Colón's 2024 gubernatorial campaign, as the Executive Director of the Luis A. Ferré Public Policy Institute, she drafted the 2024 New Progressive Party's Government Platform titled #AcciónPR.

Ferraiouli is an experienced attorney with over 25 years of expertise in civil litigation and consulting. Her focus has been on federal and state court cases, extraordinary remedies, and constitutional issues. Ferraiuoli's background includes civil rights, constitutional law, and intellectual property.

== Education ==
Ferraiuoli earned a Bachelor of Liberal Arts in Social Sciences at Johns Hopkins University in 1994. She completed her Juris Doctor at Boston University School of Law in 1997. After completing her J.D., she went on to complete an LL.M. in Litigation and Alternative Dispute Resolution at the Interamerican University of Puerto Rico School of Law.

Ferraiuoli was admitted to the practice of law in Puerto Rico in 1998. She is also admitted to the bar in several federal and specialized judicial forums, including the United States Court of Appeals for the First Circuit and the United States District Court for the District of Puerto Rico in 1998, the United States Court of Appeals for the District of Columbia Circuit and the United States Court of International Trade in 1999, and the Supreme Court of the United States in 2001.

== Career ==
=== Early career ===
Ferraiuoli's legal career has included work in state and federal litigation, international trade, corporate matters, and health-related legal issues. She has represented clients in various cases, including one before the U.S. Court of Appeals for the First Circuit involving sovereign immunity under the Foreign Sovereign Immunities Act. She participated in a case before the Supreme Court of Puerto Rico addressing the constitutionality of mandatory membership for veterinarians in professional associations. In February 2023, she represented the Colegio de Contadores Públicos Autorizados de Puerto Rico before the Supreme Court of Puerto Rico, defending the constitutionality of mandatory membership requirements for certified public accountants. The Court ruled in the Colegio's favor.

In October 2017, joined the office of the Resident Commissioner of Puerto Rico, Jenniffer González-Colón. Initially employed part-time, she transitioned to full-time work in April 2019. During this period, she served as Deputy Chief of Staff and Legal Counsel. In this role, she provided strategic and legal counsel on federal matters affecting Puerto Rico and helped coordinate efforts between the island and the U.S. Congress.

During the 2020 Democratic Party presidential primaries, Ferraiuoli was a Democratic delegate who cast a vote for Michael Bloomberg. In January 2022, Ferraiuoli was considered for a nomination to the U.S. District Court for the District of Puerto Rico. This effort had the support of Governor Pedro Pierluisi and Resident Commissioner González-Colón. However, her candidacy did not advance due to political dynamics in the U.S. Congress and the federal administration.

Ferraiuoli was president of the Federal Bar Association Puerto Rico Chapter. In 2024, she was Executive Director of the Luis A. Ferré Public Policy Institute. In November 2024, Ferraiuoli was appointed as acting chair of the government transition committee for the incoming administration in Puerto Rico. During the transition process, she highlighted the need for agency heads to prioritize pending issues and future challenges rather than focusing on past achievements.

=== Secretary of State of Puerto Rico ===
In December 2024, Governor-Elect González-Colón announced her intention to nominate Ferraiuoli as secretary of state of Puerto Rico. On January 2, 2025, Ferraiuoli was appointed to the role.

On April 7, 2025, she was confirmed by the Puerto Rico House of Representatives by a clear majority. On April 27, 2025, Ferraiuoli requested Governor González-Colón to withdraw her nomination before the Puerto Rico Senate as she did not want to be a political distraction because of the Senate President Thomas Rivera Schatz's political agenda against the Governor. She continues to serve the González Colón Administration as the Executive Director of the Puerto Rico Convention Center District Authority and as Efficiency Coordinator, the local equivalent of DOGE.

=== Efficiency Coordinator ===
In February 2025, while serving as Secretary of State, Governor González-Colón signed the Executive Order 2025-009 to review and update governmental structures and systems, as well as to modernize and simplify processes, procedures, regulations, rules, and other administrative provisions. Pursuant to the Governor's Executive Order, Secretary Ferraiuoli issued three administrative orders establishing the mission, purpose, foundation, and initial guidelines to be implemented across all government agencies and instrumentalities in what was designated as the Initiative for Deregulation and Efficient Administration (IDEA). In May, after leaving the Department of State, Governor González-Colón issued Executive Order 2025-023 to appoint Ferraiuoli as Efficiency Coordinator of the Government of Puerto.

As Efficiency Coordinator and lead of IDEA, Ferraiuoli created "efficiency committees" in all government agencies in charge of implementing the González-Colón Administration government efficiency measures. IDEA’s first comprehensive project was review of all active regulations of the Government of Puerto Rico’s agencies and instrumentalities. IDEA found 4,160 active regulations, of which 90% (3,763 regulations) have not been updated in over 5 years. As of February 2026, Ferraiuoli has overseen the repeal of 343 regulations across 18 government agencies representing approximately 10,500 pages of regulatory text eliminated, including 87 regulations of the Department of Economic Development and Commerce. Agencies continue to review outdated regulations periodically to update and streamline procedures.

After the first phase of IDEA's regulatory review, Governor González-Colón filed Administration Bill 107 to the Puerto Rico Legislative Assembly to overhaul the state government’s rulemaking processes and modernize its regulatory framework, prioritizing efficiency, accountability, and clarity. The bill proposes establishing a Puerto Rico Regulatory Bulletin and a Puerto Rico Code of Regulations, official digital platforms modeled after the Federal Register and Code of Federal Regulations to publish and consolidate regulatory actions. It would also institute a requirement for preliminary economic impact assessments when a proposed regulation would affect Puerto Rico’s competitiveness, have substantial fiscal impact, or impose significant costs on the private sector. Other reforms include periodic review and accountability measures, an expedited process to repeal regulations, and plain language requirements, among others.

== Personal life ==
Ferraiuoli is married to Francisco Domenech, longtime campaign manager to González-Colón.

Political offices
Preceded by Omar J. Marrero	Secretary of State of Puerto Rico; Acting; 2025	Succeeded by Narel Colón; Acting
