= Fernando Bonilla =

Puerto Rican jurist and politician

Fernando J. Bonilla
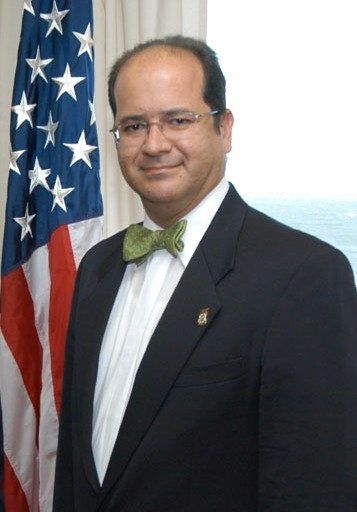

Secretary of State of Puerto Rico
- In office June 2005 – January 2, 2009
- Governor: Aníbal Acevedo Vilá
- Preceded by: Jose Izquierdo Encarnacion
- Succeeded by: Kenneth D. McClintock

Judge of the Puerto Rico Court of Appeals
- Incumbent
- Assumed office 2015
- Appointed by: Alejandro García Padilla

Personal details
- Born: 1962 (age 63–64) Ponce, Puerto Rico
- Party: Democratic
- Education: University of Puerto Rico School of Law (JD); Tulane University Law School (LLM)

Fernando J. Bonilla Ortiz (born 1962 in Ponce, Puerto Rico) is a Puerto Rican political figure who served as the secretary of State of the Commonwealth of Puerto Rico. Bonilla also served as the Executive Director of the Puerto Rico Ports Authority.

As Secretary of State, Bonilla was constitutionally empowered to assume the seat of Governor of Puerto Rico in case that the incumbent was incapable to do so. After the federal indictment of incumbent Governor Aníbal Acevedo Vilá, the possibility existed that Acevedo might resign his position, thereby elevating Bonilla to the seat of governor.

== Early life and education ==
Bonilla received a Juris Doctor from the University of Puerto Rico School of Law and an LLM from Tulane University School of Law. He served as law clerk to Associate Justice of the Supreme Court of Puerto Rico Miriam Naveira from 1985–1987. Bonilla worked primarily in the private sector, specializing in maritime law.

== Public service career ==
Bonilla was appointed Executive Director of the Puerto Rico Ports Authority in early 2005 by Governor Aníbal Acevedo Vilá. After Marisara Pont Marchese's confirmation was rejected by the House of Representatives of Puerto Rico for the post of Secretary of State, Governor Acevedo turned to Bonilla and nominated him in the summer of 2005 for the position. He was confirmed by both houses of the Legislative Assembly of Puerto Rico and effectively began serving in both posts.

In Puerto Rico, the Secretary of State has the role, but not the official title, of Lieutenant Governor, in addition to heading the State Department. However, the Constitution provides that whenever the Governor is unable to carry out his duties, dies, is impeached or resigns, the Secretary of State shall succeed in the post. If Governor Aníbal Acevedo Vilá would have resigned after the federal indictment of March 27, 2008, Bonilla would have assumed the governorship.

On January 2, 2009, after fulfilling the traditional role of serving as the initial Master of Ceremony of incoming Governor Luis Fortuño's Inaugural Ceremonies, he introduced and turned over that role to his successor, former Puerto Rico Senate President Kenneth McClintock, who, coincidentally, was also a fellow Tulane University School of Law graduate.

Political offices
Preceded by Jose Izquierdo Encarnacion	Secretary of State of Puerto Rico; 2005–2009	Succeeded by Kenneth McClintock
