= Rosachely Rivera =

Puerto Rican politician (born 1980)

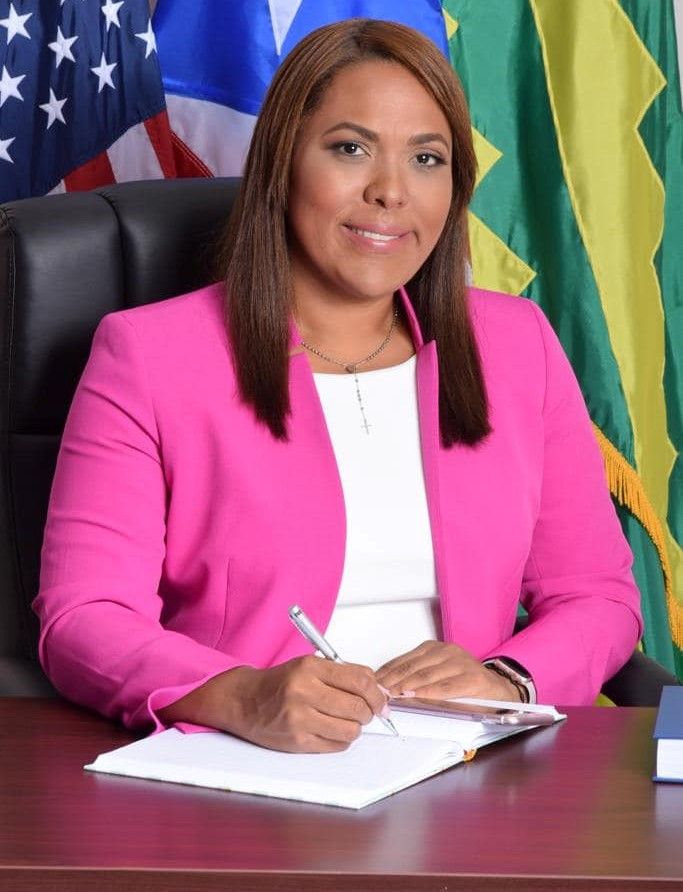
- Rivera in 2022

Secretary of State of Puerto Rico
- Incumbent
- Assumed office July 3, 2025
- Governor: Jenniffer González
- Preceded by: Narel Colón (acting)

Mayor of Gurabo
- In office December 7, 2016 – July 3, 2025; Acting: December 7, 2016 – April 2, 2017
- Preceded by: Victor Manuel Ortiz
- Succeeded by: Glenda Villafañe (acting)

Personal details
- Born: Rosachely Rivera Santana; April 5, 1980 (age 46) Caguas, Puerto Rico
- Party: New Progressive
- Other political affiliations: Democratic
- Education: University of Puerto Rico (BA); Albizu University (MA)

Rosachely Rivera Santana is a Puerto Rican politician and professor who has served as the Secretary of State of Puerto Rico since 2025. Prior to her tenure as secretary of state she was the mayor of Gurabo, Puerto Rico from 2016 to 2025. She is a member of the New Progressive Party.

== Early life and education ==
Rosachely Rivera Santana was born in Caguas, Puerto Rico, on April 5, 1980, to Rafael Rivera Aguayo and Marcelina Santana Fontánez. Her elementary and middle school education was done at Colegio Bautista de Gurabo and she graduated from high school at Dra. Conchita Cuevas in 1998. She graduated from the University of Puerto Rico, Río Piedras Campus with a bachelor's degree in labor relations and a minor in psychology and a master's degree in industrial-organization psychology from Albizu University.

== Career ==
In 2013, Rivera became a professor at the University of Turabo and taught psychology courses.

=== Local politics ===
Rivera became a human resources manager after graduating from college. She became director of the Office of Youth Affairs for Gurabo, Puerto Rico in 2005, and continued as director after it merged with the Office of Recreation and Sports in 2007. She became the special assistant to the mayor in 2009.

In 2015, Rivera was appointed as Municipal Administrator of Gurabo in 2015, and served until December 7, 2016, when she became interim mayor of Gurabo. She won the special mayoral election in 2017 and was the first woman to serve as mayor of Gurabo. She oversaw the response to Hurricane Irma and Hurricane Maria. She was reelected mayor in 2020 and 2024.

== Politics ==
In May 2025, Governor Jenniffer González-Colón announced her intention to nominate Rivera to the position of Secretary of State of Puerto Rico. After the failed nominations of Verónica Ferraiuoli and Arthur Garffer, the governor nominated Rivera to head the Department of State.

On June 9, 2025, the Senate confirmed her nomination as Secretary of State alongside Lourdes Gómez Torres as Secretary of Justice and María Del Pilar Vélez Casanova as Secretary of Labor and Human Resources. Rivera’s nomination was confirmed by the House on June 30, 2025. She was sworn in by Governor González-Colón on July 3, 2025.

Political offices
Preceded by Narel Colón; Acting	Secretary of State of Puerto Rico; 2025–present	Incumbent
Preceded by Victor Manuel Ortiz	Mayor of Gurabo; 2016–2025	Succeeded by Glenda Villafañe; Acting
