= Marisara Pont Marchese =

Puerto Rican public relations consultant

Secretary of State of Puerto Rico
- In office 2005–2005
- Governor: Aníbal Acevedo Vilá
- Preceded by: Jose Izquierdo Encarnacion
- Succeeded by: Fernando Bonilla

Personal details
- Born: October 29, 1941 (age 84) Río Piedras, Puerto Rico
- Party: Popular Democratic Party
- Other political affiliations: Democratic
- Education: University of Puerto Rico (BS); Columbia University (MS)

Marisara Pont Marchese (born October 29, 1941) served as the Secretary of State of Puerto Rico, as well as Acting Governor in the absence of Governor Aníbal Acevedo Vilá and the only one whose recess term ended when denied legislative confirmation. She is a public relations consultant in Puerto Rico and has held several public and partisan offices over the years.

She earned Bachelor in Humanities cum laude, from the University of Puerto Rico, 1963. Master of Science in Library. Science, from Columbia University, 1971.

She was a member of the University of Puerto Rico's Board of Trustees, appointed in 2001. In 2005, she served for 5 months as the third woman and 20th Secretary of State of Puerto Rico under a recess appointment by Governor Acevedo-Vilá. However, after winning Senate confirmation under the presidency of Kenneth McClintock, who would subsequently serve as the 22nd Secretary of State of Puerto Rico, her nomination was rejected by the House in May of that year. Under the Constitution of Puerto Rico, the Secretary of State is the only Cabinet member requiring confirmation by both houses of the Legislature, by virtue of the fact that the Secretary exercises the role of lieutenant governor.

Political offices
Preceded by Jose Izquierdo Encarnacion	Secretary of State of Puerto Rico; 2005–2005	Succeeded by Fernando Bonilla
