= 2025 in Puerto Rico =

- Decades: 2000s; 2010s; 2020s
- See also: History of Puerto Rico; Historical outline of Puerto Rico; List of years in Puerto Rico; 2025 in the United States

Events in the year 2025 in Puerto Rico.

== Incumbents ==
- President:
  - Joe Biden (D) (till January 20)
  - Donald Trump (R) (from January 20)
- Governor:
  - Pedro Pierluisi (D) (till January 2)
  - Jenniffer González (R) (from January 2)
- Resident Commissioner:
  - Jenniffer González (till January 2)
  - Pablo Hernández Rivera (from January 2)

== Events ==
=== January ===
- January 2 – Jenniffer González is sworn in as Governor.
- January 27 – An employee at a San Juan plumbing business kills four co-workers in a workplace shooting before killing himself.

=== February ===
- February 12 – Two children are killed in a shooting at a house in Rio Grande.

=== March ===
- March 7 – One person is injured following an oil spill of the coast of Vieques.

=== April ===
- April 16 – The entirety of Puerto Rico is struck by a blackout.
- April 28 – One person is killed during flooding caused by heavy rains in San Juan.

=== May ===
- May 3 – One person is killed after his car is struck by a falling tree caused by heavy rains in Toa Baja.

=== June ===
- June 2 – The Supreme Court of Puerto Rico rules in favor of allowing nonbinary and gender-nonconforming people to select "X" as their gender marker on birth certificates.
- June 24 – A magnitude 5.7 earthquake off the coast of the neighboring Dominican Republic causes power outages in parts of Utuado.

=== July ===
- July 11–September 20 – Rapper Bad Bunny holds his 30-show residency in Puerto Rico.
- July 17 – Governor Gonzalez signs into law a bill barring hormone therapy or gender-affirming surgeries for transgender people under 21.
- July 24 – Four horses are killed by a falling utility pole in Utuado that also triggers a blackout.
- July 30 – Governor Gonzalez declares an island-wide state of emergency and mobilizes the Puerto Rico National Guard in response to a water shortage that affects nearly 180,000 customers in the past week.

=== August ===
- August 1 – One person is killed while five others are injured in a shooting at a nightclub in Mayaguez.
- August 5 – The Trump administration dismisses all five Democratic members of the seven-person Financial Oversight and Management Board for Puerto Rico, including chairman Arthur Gonzalez, citing inefficiency.
- August 10 – A tourist from the mainland United States is killed in a shooting in the La Perla neighborhood of San Juan.
- August 27 – BlackRock withdraws from an agreement to restructure $9 billion in debt held by the Puerto Rico Electric Power Authority in response to changes in the composition of the Financial Oversight and Management Board for Puerto Rico.

=== September ===
- September 4 – The residence of baseball player and manager Yadier Molina is a targeted by a burglary in Toa Alta, resulting in the theft of items valued at $57,000, including 14 pigs and one horse.
- September 7 – The federal government announces the deployment of 10 additional fighter aircraft to Puerto Rico to carry out operations against drug cartels amid escalating tensions with Venezuela.
- September 8 – Defense Secretary Pete Hegseth and Air Force General Dan Caine meet with officials at Muñiz Air National Guard Base in Carolina.

=== October ===
- October 7 – Police find the bodies of five naked men, three near a church in Carolina and two in Santurce, San Juan. The police superintendent says the deaths are likely related to drug trafficking.
- October 19 – A broken pipe causes a water outage affecting 165,000 clients in 15 cities and towns including in San Juan.

=== December ===
- December 14 – Governor Gonzalez signs a bill increasing the deadline for government agencies to release documents to the public.

== Holidays ==
- 1 January – New Year's Day
- 6 January – Epiphany
- 11 January – Eugenio María de Hostos Day
- 20 January – Martin Luther King Jr. Day
- 14 February – Carnival
- 19 February – Presidents' Day
- 22 March – Emancipation Day
- 16 April – Birthday of José de Diego
- 18 April – Good Friday
- 20 April – Easter Sunday
- 27 May – Memorial Day
- 4 July – Independence Day
- 25 July – Puerto Rico Constitution Day
- 1 September – Labor Day
- 14 October – Columbus Day
- 11 November – Veterans Day
- 19 November – Discovery Day
- 27 November – Thanksgiving Day
- 25 December – Christmas Day

== Deaths ==
- 17 October – Carlos López Rivera, 67, mayor of Dorado (since 1987)
- 6 December – Rafael Ithier, 99, salsa musician (El Gran Combo)

== See also ==
- 2025 in the United States
- 2025 Atlantic hurricane season
- 2025 in the Caribbean
