= 2026 in Puerto Rico =

- Decades: 2000s; 2010s; 2020s
- See also: History of Puerto Rico; Historical outline of Puerto Rico; List of years in Puerto Rico; 2026 in the United States

Events in the year 2026 in Puerto Rico.

== Incumbents ==
- President:
  - Donald Trump (R)
- Governor:
  - Jenniffer González (R)
- Resident Commissioner:
  - Pablo Hernández Rivera

== Events ==
=== January ===
- 13 January – The Public Housing Administration orders a compulsory inspection of 56,000 units at 328 projects across the territory following criticism over subhuman living conditions.

=== February ===
- 1 February – 68th Annual Grammy Awards: Bad Bunny's Debí Tirar Más Fotos album becomes the first Spanish-language album to win Album of the Year at the 2026 Grammy Awards.
- 6–22 February – Puerto Rico at the 2026 Winter Olympics
- 12 February – Governor Gonzalez signs a law recognizing a fetus as a human being.

=== March ===
- 4 March – A patient is killed in a gun attack on an ambulance in Santurce.
- 5–17 March – 2026 World Baseball Classic in Japan, Puerto Rico, and the United States
- 23 March
  - Immigration and Customs Enforcement agents are deployed to 14 airports nationwide, including Luis Muñoz Marín International Airport.
  - Police seize $12 million worth of cocaine found on a drug smuggling boat off the island's northern coast. Three suspects are arrested.

=== April ===
- 1 April – A protest over a rate fare increase results in the Puerto Rican government temporarily shutting down ferry service between the main island and Vieques. The protest is held in response to an increase in price from $2 to $11.25 for those who do not live on Vieques.

=== May ===
- 26 May – Sebastián Negrón Reichard resigns as Secretary of Economic Development and Commerce of Puerto Rico, citing excessive interference by the Gonzalez administration.
- 27 May – Governor Gonzalez declares a state of emergency in response to increased coastal erosion in the northern part of the island.

=== July ===
- 21 July – Governor Gonzalez announces the resignation of her Chief of Staff, Francisco Domenech, and his deputy, Itza García, amid allegations of irregularities at the Puerto Rico Office of Permit Management.

=== August ===
- 7 August – The Puerto Rico Aqueduct and Sewer Authority begins temporarily shutting off water in the San Juan area due to water shortages.

=== September ===
- 17 September – A magnitude 4.8 earthquake hits Yauco, injuring three people.
- 28 September – A boat capsizes near Isla de Mona following a fight involving a machete. The United States Coast Guard rescues at least 40 people. Three people are killed.

=== October ===
- 11 October – Three people are killed and eight injured in a shooting at a café in Río Piedras.

=== November ===
- 24 November – The 2026 Miss Universe pageant

== Holidays ==
- 1 January – New Year's Day
- 6 January – Epiphany
- 11 January – Eugenio María de Hostos Day
- 19 January – Martin Luther King Jr. Day
- 16 February – Presidents' Day
- 18 February – Carnival
- 22 March – Emancipation Day
- 3 April – Good Friday
- 5 April – Easter Sunday
- 16 April – Birthday of José de Diego
- 25 May – Memorial Day
- 4 July – Independence Day
- 25 July – Puerto Rico Constitution Day
- 7 September – Labor Day
- 12 October – Columbus Day
- 11 November – Veterans Day
- 19 November – Discovery Day
- 27 November – Thanksgiving Day
- 25 December – Christmas Day

== Deaths ==
- 5 May – José Ortiz, 62, basketball player (Atléticos de San Germán, Cangrejeros de Santurce, national team)
- 10 October – Wilfredo Gómez, 69, Hall of Fame WBC super bantamweight (1977–1983), WBC featherweight (1984) and WBA super featherweight (1985–1986) champion boxer
- 26 October – Carlos Gerena, 55, Olympic boxer (1992)

== See also ==
- 2026 in the United States
- 2026 Atlantic hurricane season
- 2026 in the Caribbean
