= 2020 in Puerto Rico =

- Decades: 2000s; 2010s; 2020s
- See also: History of Puerto Rico; Historical outline of Puerto Rico; List of years in Puerto Rico; 2020 in the United States

Events in the year 2020 in Puerto Rico.

== Incumbents ==
- President: Donald Trump (Republican)
- Governor: Wanda Vázquez Garced
- Resident Commissioner: Jenniffer González

== Events ==
=== January to April ===
- January 6 – A magnitude 5.8M_{w} earthquake causes landslides, power outages, and the destruction of Punta Ventana, a natural stone arch along the southern coast. No casualties were reported.
- January 7 – A 6.4M_{w} 2020 Guayanilla earthquake rocks southwest Puerto Rico. One man died and 8 were injured. Governor Wanda Vázquez Garced declares a state of emergency and activates the national guard.
- January 18 – Residents of Ponce broke into a warehouse and found bottled water, cots, baby food, and other unused emergency supplies stored since Hurricane Maria in September 2017. Governor Wanda Vázquez fired Carlos Acevedo, the director of the island's emergency management agency.
- January 19 – Glorimar Andújar and Fernando Gil-Enseñat, Secretaries of Family Services Housing respectively, are fired in the warehouse scandal. Nino Correa is appointed chief of operations for the Emergency Management Office.
- February 2 – Jennifer Lopez wows the crowd by wearing a costume featuring the flag of Puerto Rico during her half-time appearance at the Super Bowl LIV.
- February 26 – José Irizarry, a former Drug Enforcement Administration (DEA) agent who worked in Cartagena, Colombia, and his wife, are extradited from Puerto Rico to Miami to face charges of money laundering and related crimes.
- March 4 – A referendum on possible statehood is approved for the November 3 election, although there is no money for publicity. The single question is, "Should Puerto Rico be immediately admitted into the Union as a state?", with only two options: "yes" or "no".
- March 15 - Governor Wanda Vázquez announces lockdown for Puerto Rico due to the coronavirus pandemic.
- March 23 – Governor Wanda Vázquez announces a $787 million financial package to alleviate the economic effects of the coronavirus pandemic. The package is bigger than any announced so far by U.S. states. It includes moratoriums on loans and bonuses for health service workers and police officers.
- March 25 – The island announces the first death of a resident due to the COVID-19 pandemic in Puerto Rico, a 48-year-old female teacher from Rincon. There have been 60 infected cases and two deaths in the territory, both to tourists.
- April 15
  - A federal judge rules that Puerto Rico cannot fund $300 million of pensions and health costs for municipal employees, but delays the ruling for three weeks because of the coronavirus pandemic.
  - Fifty-one deaths and 970 confirmed cases of COVID-19 have been reported in Puerto Rico, which is less than the numbers in U.S. states such as Utah, which has 3.2 million people, 18 deaths and more than 2,300 confirmed cases. However, PR has tested only 9,200 people, whereas UT has tested 45,700. The Puerto Rican government touts its low numbers as a sign of success, but critics worry about limited data and the economic effects of the lockdown that began on March 15 and will extend to May 3.
- April 18 – The government's handling of coronavirus contingency is called into question as the island's youngest victim, a 29-year-old man who had twice been denied testing for the virus before he died in a hospital emergency room, and a refrigerated trailer with food for needy people was accidentally disconnected, resulting in the loss of chicken, vegetables, fruits, and other items.
- April 26 – Rescheduled date for the 2020 Puerto Rico Democratic primary

=== May to August ===
- May 2 – The United States Geological Survey (USGS) reports an earthquake of 5.4M_{w} centered on Tallaboa, Peñuelas, Puerto Rico. Several smaller quakes were also reported in the area.
- May 6 – Congresswoman Debbie Mucarsel-Powell (D-FL) introduces legislation to assure that Latinos enrolled in Medicare Advantage in the United States and Puerto Rico do not lose coverage during the COVID-19 pandemic.
- May 7 – A judge agrees to consider a lawsuit filed by a group of mothers and nonprofits who accuse the territory's government of not fulfilling its responsibility to feed public school children during the coronavirus lockdown. The hearing is set for May 15.
- July 11 – Dozens of protesters, some wearing traditional Taino clothing, march demand that the U.S. government remove statues of Spanish explorers including those of Christopher Columbus and Juan Ponce de León. An estimated 60,000 Tainos lived in Puerto Rico when the explorers landed on the island in 1493, but they were soon forced into labor and succumbed to infectious disease outbreaks.
- July 12 – In an interview in The New York Times, former secretary of Homeland Security Elaine Duke reports that President Trump's first reaction to Hurricane Maria in 2017 was to sell Puerto Rico.
- July 22 – As tourists ignore health safety precautions such as mask wearing and social distancing rules, Governor Vázquez pushed the date for reopening back to August 15. Bars, gyms, marinas, theaters, and casinos are closed down again until July 31.
- July 24 – During a hearing before the United States House Committee on Oversight and Reform, FEMA administrator Pete Gaynor told Congresswoman Nydia Velázquez (D-NY) said he could not explain why Vieques does not have a functioning hospital, nor why 20,000 people still live under blue tarps three years after Hurricane Maria. 27,000 families have applied for R3 money from HUD, but no homes have been rebuilt yet.
- August 3 – José Ortiz, CEO of the AEE, Puerto Rico's state-owned power utility, announces his resignation as thousands of customers remain without power after Tropical Storm Isaias.
- August 9 – Rescheduled primary elections
  - 2020 Puerto Rico presidential primaries
    - 2020 Puerto Rico Democratic presidential primary
  - 2020 New Progressive Party of Puerto Rico primaries: Pedro Pierluisi defeats incumbent governor Wanda Vázquez Garced.
  - 2020 Popular Democratic Party of Puerto Rico primaries: Carlos Delgado Altieri wins 60% of the vote.
- August 17 – Anti-LGBTQ Representative María Milagros Charbonier is arrested by the FBI on corruption charges.
- August 25
  - Congresswomen Nydia Velázquez (D-NY) and Alexandria Ocasio-Cortez (D-NY) propose that the question of the political status for Puerto Rico should be decided by a convention rather than a referendum.
  - While speaking at the 2020 Republican National Convention, Kimberly Guilfoyle claims she is a first-generation American although her mother was born in Aguadilla, Puerto Rico.

=== September to December ===
- September 9 – The Pittsburgh Pirates take #21 out of retirement for a game against the Chicago White Sox at PNC Park on September 9, 2020, which is celebrated by Major League Baseball (MLB) as "Roberto Clemente Day". Clemente, a Puerto Rico native, died in a plane crash in December 1972 while en route to Nicaragua to deliver disaster relief to victims of an earthquake.
- September 14 – A bipartisan group of Congressmen led by Darren Soto (D-FL) introduce a bill to recognize the results of the November 3 referendum on statehood.
- November 3
  - 2020 Puerto Rico gubernatorial election
  - Non-binding referendum on statehood
- December 1 – The Arecibo Telescope collapses.
- December 10 – The Water and Sewer Authority and for Puerto Rico gets refinancing for $1.4 billion worth of bonds, which should result in a $13 million annual savings for the utility.

== Deaths ==
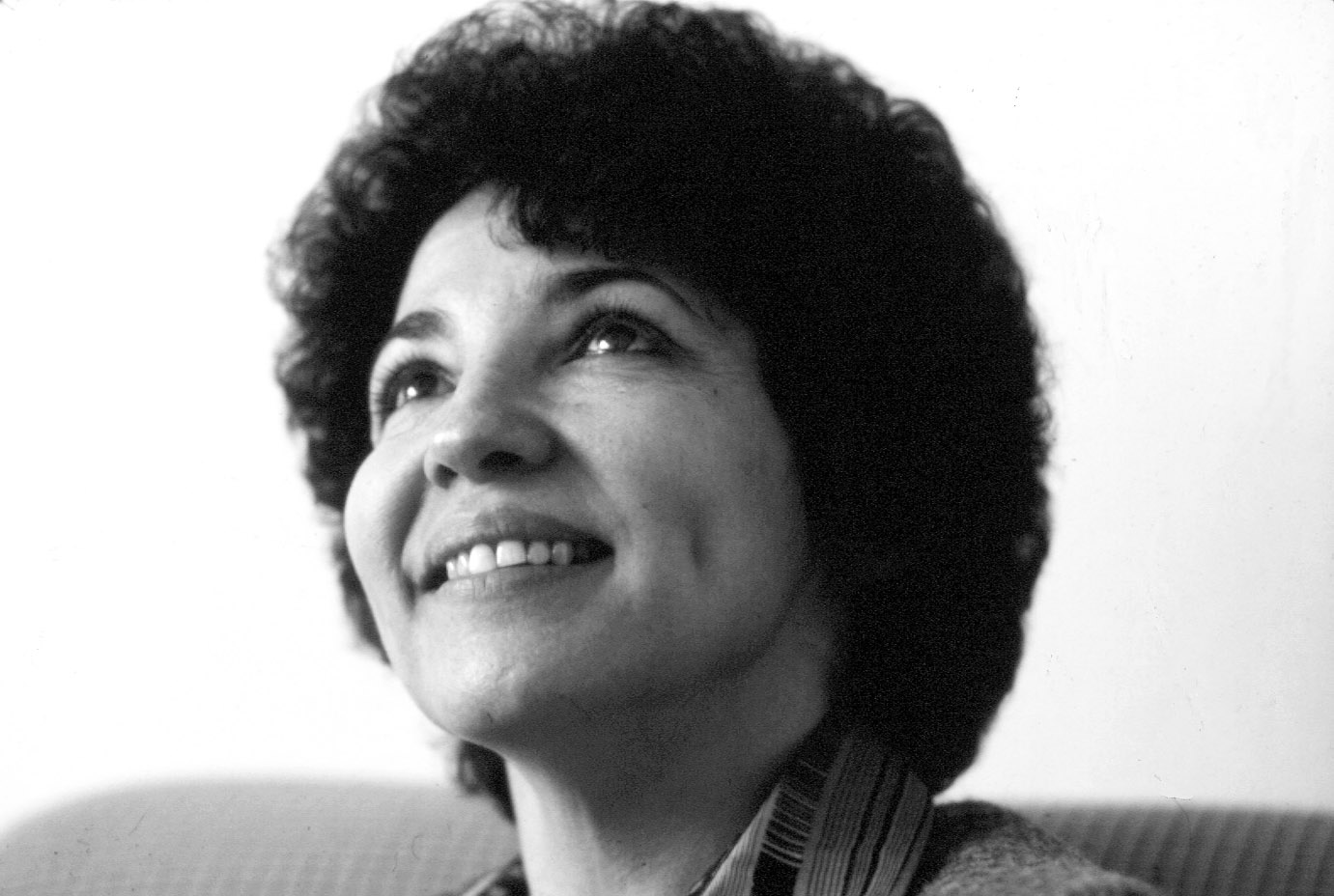
Iris M. Zavala

- January 1 – Carlos De León, boxer (b. 1959)
- January 22 – Hercules Ayala, professional wrestler (b. 1950)
- January 26 – Leo Fernández, 60, Puerto Rican television reporter and paparazzo, heart attack.
- January 27 – Ramón Avilés, 68, baseball player (Boston Red Sox, Philadelphia Phillies)
- February 7 – Wichie Torres, 67, painter, cardiovascular disease
- February 23 – Ramón Conde, 85, baseball player (Chicago White Sox)
- February 24 – Neulisa Luciano Ruiz 'Alexa,' a transgender woman; shot and killed in Toa Baja
- March 2 – Rafael Cancel Miranda, 89, independence leader and convicted attempted murderer (1954 United States Capitol shooting incident)
- April 10 – Iris M. Zavala, 83, author, independence activist and intellectual, COVID-19.
- August 6 – Miriam Jiménez Román, 69, Puerto Rican academic, cancer.
- September 22 – Soraya Santiago Solla, 72, transgender pioneer.
- October 26 – Juan R. Torruella, 87, Olympic sailor (1964, 1968, 1972, 1976) and judge, member (since 1984) and Chief Judge (1994–2001) of the U.S. Court of Appeals for the First Circuit.
- October 28 – Cano Estremera, 62, salsa singer.
- November 5 – Manuel Torres, 74, volleyball player (national team); heart attack.
- December 1 – Miguel Algarín, 79, writer, co-founder of the Nuyorican Poets Cafe.
- December 7 – Roger Moret, 71, baseball player (Boston Red Sox, Atlanta Braves, Texas Rangers), cancer.
- December 24 – Tito Rojas ("El gallo salsero"), Salsa singer (El gallo salsero and Siempre seré).

== See also ==
- 2020 in the Caribbean
- 2020 in the United States
- 2020 in United States politics and government
- 2020 in Mexico
- 2020 in Central America
- COVID-19 pandemic in Puerto Rico
- 2020 Atlantic hurricane season
- List of earthquakes in 2020
- 2020s
