= 2022 in Puerto Rico =

- Decades: 2000s; 2010s; 2020s
- See also: History of Puerto Rico; Historical outline of Puerto Rico; List of years in Puerto Rico; 2022 in the United States

Events in the year 2022 in Puerto Rico.

== Incumbents ==
- President: Joe Biden (D)
- Governor: Pedro Pierluisi (D)
- Resident Commissioner: Jenniffer González

== Events ==
=== January to April ===
- January 18 – A federal judge signs a plan to restructure Puerto Rico's economy, allowing it to start repaying debt to creditors and lifting it out of bankruptcy.
- March 15 – Puerto Rican government-debt crisis: Puerto Rico exits out of bankruptcy after completing the largest public debt restructuring in U.S. history.
- April 7 – Around two million people in Puerto Rico are left without electricity after a fire occurs at one of the island's largest power plants.
- May 12 – Eleven people die and thirty-one others are rescued after a boat capsizes off the coast of Puerto Rico near Desecheo Island.
- May 22 – Five people are shot dead at a public housing complex in Caimito, San Juan.
- July 1 – Puerto Rico reports its first case of monkeypox.
- September 18 – Hurricane Fiona makes landfall in Puerto Rico causing the entire island to lose power. The U.S. National Hurricane Center warns of "life-threatening flash flooding" on the island amid "historic" rainfall.

== Deaths ==
- January 4 – Julio Ferrer, 68, Olympic sprinter (1976)
- January 18 – Tito Matos, 53, requinto player
- January 26 – Juan Báez, 86, Olympic basketball player (1960, 1964)
- February 3 – Dean Zayas, 83, actor, director, and playwright
- February 9 –
  - Luz Odilia Font, 92, actress
  - Juan R. Melecio Machuca, 87, lawyer, director of the Office of Legislative Services (1981–1988)
- April 16 – Mariano Ortiz, 77, Olympic basketball player (1968, 1972, 1976)
- May 13 – Carlos Ortiz, 85, Hall of Fame boxer, world super lightweight (1959–1960) and WBA/WBC lightweight champion (1962–1965, 1965–1968)
- July 1 – Joe Hatton, 74, Olympic basketball player (1968, 1972)
- July 5 – José Vicente, 100, Olympic pole vaulter (1948, 1952)
- July 17 – Héctor Tricoche, 66, salsa singer-songwriter
- August 18 – Milt Ramírez, 72, baseball player (St. Louis Cardinals, Oakland Athletics)

== See also ==
- 2022 in Central America
- 2022 Atlantic hurricane season
- 2020s
