= 2024 in Puerto Rico =

- Decades: 2000s; 2010s; 2020s
- See also: History of Puerto Rico; Historical outline of Puerto Rico; List of years in Puerto Rico; 2024 in the United States

Events in the year 2024 in Puerto Rico.

== Incumbents ==
- President: Joe Biden (D)
- Governor: Pedro Pierluisi (D)
- Resident Commissioner: Jenniffer González

== Events ==
- 16 January – A drive-by shooting kills five people in Ceiba. Authorities say the killings are likely connected to drug trafficking.
- March 10 – 2024 Puerto Rico Republican presidential primary
- April 3 – The United States Army Corps of Engineers begins dredging the San Juan Bay to open space for a new natural gas terminal that is expected to add $400 million to the local economy.
- 5 May – Rains occur in Puerto Rico, where planes are landed in San Juan to reroute from Haiti.
- 8 May – A state of emergency is declared in Puerto Rico due to heavy rains, flooding and landslides that leave one person missing.
- 25 June – Puerto Rico announces its first island-wide heat advisory to all 78 municipalities due to predicted highs of 114 °F (46 °C) and widespread power outages.
- 13 August – Schools are canceled in Puerto Rico as Tropical Storm Ernesto is expected to strengthen into a hurricane overnight.
- 3 October – Sixty-four migrants from Haiti are detained by US authorities after being abandoned in Isla de Mona by smugglers.
- November 5 –
  - 2024 Puerto Rico gubernatorial election
  - 2024 Puerto Rican general election
- 31 December – A massive blackout leaves most of Puerto Rico without electricity.

== Holidays ==
- 1 January - New Year's Day
- 6 January - Epiphany
- 11 January - Eugenio María de Hostos Day
- 15 January - Martin Luther King Jr. Day
- 14 February – Carnival
- 19 February – Presidents' Day
- 23 March - Emancipation Day
- 29 March – Good Friday
- 16 April – Birthday of José de Diego
- 27 May – Memorial Day
- 4 July – Independence Day
- 25 July – Puerto Rico Constitution Day
- 2 September – Labor Day
- 14 October – Columbus Day
- 11 November – Veterans Day
- 17 November – Discovery Day
- 28 November – Thanksgiving Day
- 25 December – Christmas Day

== Deaths ==
- 2 January – Rafael Valle, 85, Olympic basketball player (1960).
- 27 December – Paul Bamba, 35, professional boxer

== See also ==
- 2024 in the United States
- 2024 Atlantic hurricane season
- 2024 in the Caribbean
