= 2023 in Puerto Rico =

- Decades: 2000s; 2010s; 2020s
- See also: History of Puerto Rico; Historical outline of Puerto Rico; List of years in Puerto Rico; 2023 in the United States

Events in the year 2023 in Puerto Rico.

== Incumbents ==
- President: Joe Biden (D)
- Governor: Pedro Pierluisi (D)
- Resident Commissioner: Jenniffer González

== Events ==
=== January to May ===
- March 17 – The Puerto Rico national baseball team is eliminated from the 2023 World Baseball Classic in the quarterfinals, in a 5-4 loss to Mexico.
- April 11 – Governor Pedro Pierluisi declares a state of emergency on coastal erosion.
- July 20 – The 20th Premios Juventud (Youth Awards) are held at the José Miguel Agrelot Coliseum in San Juan, Puerto Rico

== Deaths ==
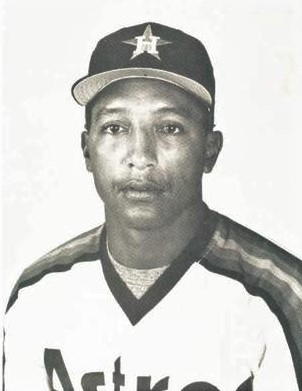
Bert Peña

- January 17 – Rickin Sánchez, television broadcaster.
- January 19 – Bert Peña, baseball player (b. 1959).
- July 20 – Luis Hiraldo, jockey (b. 1992).
- November 20 – Willie Hernández, baseball player (Chicago Cubs, Detroit Tigers) (b. 1954).
- December 24 – Kamar de los Reyes, actor (One Life to Live, Call of Duty: Black Ops II, Sleepy Hollow) (b. 1967).

== See also ==
- 2023 in the United States
- COVID-19 pandemic in Puerto Rico
- 2020s
