= 2019 in Puerto Rico =

- Decades: 1990s; 2000s; 2010s; 2020s
- See also: History of Puerto Rico; Historical outline of Puerto Rico; List of years in Puerto Rico; 2019 in the United States

Events in the year 2019 in Puerto Rico.

== Incumbents ==
- President: Donald Trump (Republican)
- Governor: Ricardo Rosselló (until August 2), Pedro Pierluisi (De Facto) (starting August 2), Wanda Vázquez Garced (starting August 8)
- Resident Commissioner: Jenniffer González

== Events ==
- July–August: Summer revolution initiated by leaked chats lead to resignation of Ricardo Rosselló as governor of the Commonwealth, the placement of Pedro Pierluisi as interim governor which was vacated by a 9-0 Puerto Rico Supreme Court decision, and the inauguration of Wanda Vázquez Garced as the 13th Constitutional Governor of the Commonwealth.
- October 14: The Ernesto Ramos Antonini public housing residence, located near the University of Puerto Rico, Río Piedras Campus, was the site of a mass killing with more than 1000 shots fired and six people dead.

=== Sports ===
- Continued from 2018: The 2018–19 Liga Puerto Rico

== Deaths ==
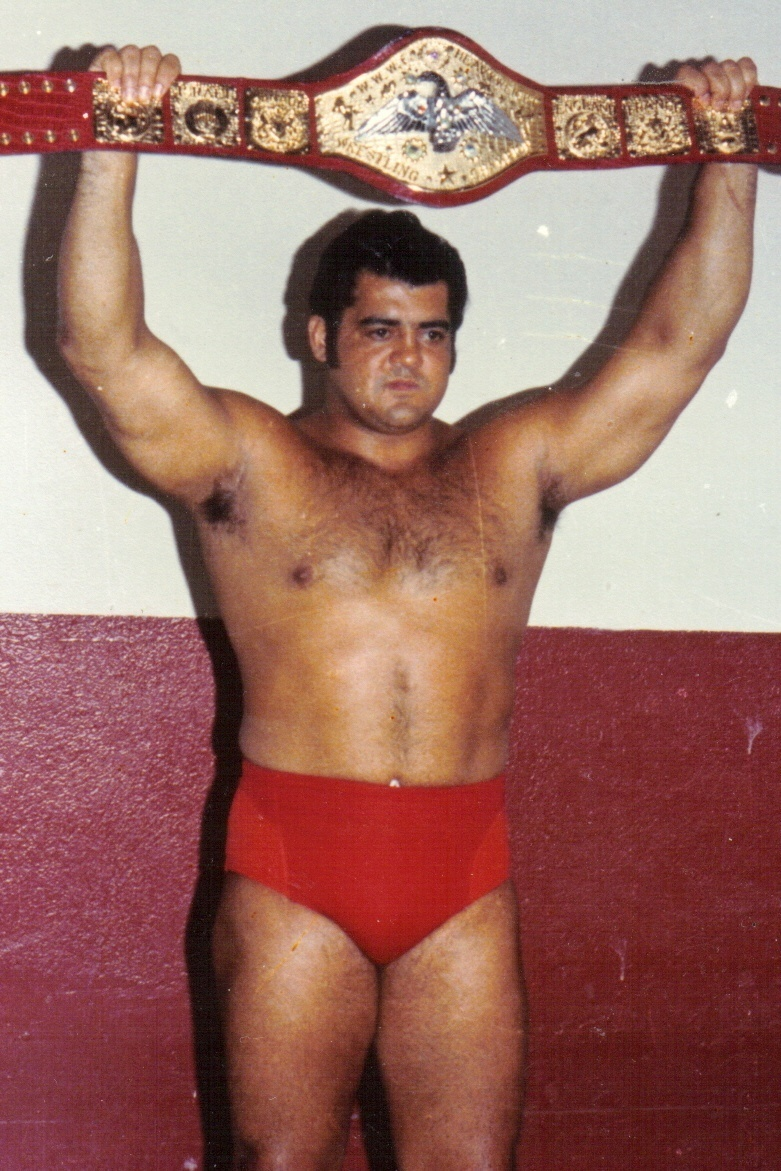
Pedro Morales

- 10 January – Kevin Fret, musician (b. 1994).
- 12 February – Pedro Morales, professional wrestler and commentator (b. 1942).
