= 1943 in Puerto Rico =

- Decades: 1920s; 1930s; 1940s; 1950s; 1960s
- See also: History of Puerto Rico; Historical outline of Puerto Rico; List of years in Puerto Rico; 1943 in the United States

Events in the year 1943 in Puerto Rico.

== Incumbents ==
- President: Franklin D. Roosevelt
- Governor: Rexford Tugwell
- Resident Commissioner: Bolívar Pagán

== Events ==
- uncertain date in 1943 – Legislative Assembly unanimously passes a concurrent resolution calling for an end to the colonial system of government.

=== May to August ===
- May 13 – Legislative Assembly passes the "Civil Rights Act of Puerto Rico"

== Deaths ==
- May 13
  - Trina de Moya – Dominican poet and first lady (1899, 1902–1903, 1924–1930)

== See also ==
- 1943 in the United States
- 1943 Atlantic hurricane season
- List of earthquakes in 1943
- 1940s
