= 2021 in Puerto Rico =

- Decades: 2000s; 2010s; 2020s
- See also: History of Puerto Rico; Historical outline of Puerto Rico; List of years in Puerto Rico; 2021 in the United States

Events in the year 2021 in Puerto Rico.

== Incumbents ==
- President: Donald Trump (R) (until January 20), Joe Biden (D) (starting January 20)
- Governor: Wanda Vázquez Garced (R) (until January 2), Pedro Pierluisi (D) (starting January 2)
- Resident Commissioner: Jenniffer González

== Events ==
=== January to April ===
- January 2 – Pedro Pierluisi, 61, is sworn in as the new governor.
- January 5 – President Donald Trump announces $3.7 billion to rebuild water infrastructure. The grant covers 90% of the estimated costs of the water and wastewater improvement projects.
- January 24 – Governor Pedro Pierluisi declares a state of emergency over gender violence. The island saw 62 cases of femicide in 2020 and violence against members of the LGBTQ community.
- February 1 – President Joe Biden signs an order providing $6.2 billion to Puerto Rico for disaster mitigation.
- February 2 – The Health Department announces that for the next 28 days the COVID-19 vaccine will be exclusively for adults 65 years of age and older.
- February 23 – Governor Pedro Pierluisi rejects a proposed debt settlement because of concerns about the effect on the territory′s pension system.
- February 24 – A box containing 31 doses of COVID-19 vaccine is found on a street in Morovis. The vaccines had spoiled. Puerto Rico has reported at least 91,834 cases and 2,007 deaths from the virus.
- March 12 – San Juan′s San José Church prepares for reopening after being closed in 1996 for restoration and repairs. The second-oldest church on the island, which was built in 1532 near the ocean on top of a Taíno settlement at the highest point of Old San Juan, was originally a Dominican convent where Bartolomé de las Casas lived.
- March 23 – The United States Department of Education releases $912 million in federal funds that had been held up by the Trump administration.
- March – 27 schools reopen for in-person classes after being shut for year due to the Covid-19 pandemic .
- April 13 – Puerto Rican military veterans are onored on the first annual National Day of Borinqueneers.

== Deaths ==
- January 15 – Elizam Escobar, 72, art theorist, poet, and political activist, cancer.
- February 16 – Ángel Mangual, 73, baseball player (Oakland Athletics, Pittsburgh Pirates), World Series champion (1972, 1973, 1974).
- February 18 – Juan Pizarro, 84, baseball player, (Milwaukee Braves, Chicago White Sox), cancer.
- February 26 – Ferdinand Vega, 84, Olympic archer (1972).
- March 11 – Orlando Llenza, 90, military officer.
- March 15 – Albert Rodriguez, 58, comedic actor.

== See also ==
- 2021 in United States politics and government
- 2021 in Central America
- 2021 Atlantic hurricane season
- 2020s
