= Commonwealth Day (disambiguation) =

Commonwealth Day is an annual commemoration of the Commonwealth of Nations.

Commonwealth Day may also refer to:

- Commonwealth Day, a public holiday in Puerto Rico on 25 July
- Commonwealth Day, Northern Mariana Islands' national day on 8 January
