= 2018 in Puerto Rico =

- Decades: 1990s; 2000s; 2010s; 2020s
- See also: History of Puerto Rico; Historical outline of Puerto Rico; List of years in Puerto Rico; 2018 in the United States

Events in the year 2018 in Puerto Rico.

== Incumbents ==
- President: Donald Trump (Republican)
- Governor: Ricardo Rosselló
- Resident Commissioner: Jenniffer González

== Events ==
- 18 April - Puerto Rico experiences an island-wide blackout after an excavator accidentally downs a transmission line.

== Deaths ==
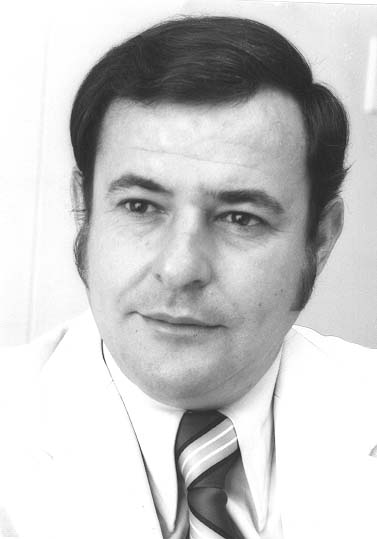
Baltasar Corrada del Río

- 22 January – Shorty Castro, comedian, songwriter and entertainer (b. 1928).
- 24 January – Julio Navarro, baseball player (b. 1936)
- 11 March – Baltasar Corrada del Río, judge and politician (b. 1935)
- 14 March – Pijuan, pianist (b. 1942)
- 20 March – Sergio Peña Clos, politician (b. 1927)
