= 2017 in Puerto Rico =

- Decades: 1990s; 2000s; 2010s; 2020s
- See also: History of Puerto Rico; Historical outline of Puerto Rico; List of years in Puerto Rico; 2017 in the United States

Events in the year 2017 in Puerto Rico.

== Incumbents ==
- President: Barack Obama (Democratic) (until January 20), Donald Trump (Republican) (starting January 20)
- Governor: Alejandro García Padilla (until January 2), Ricardo Rosselló (starting January 2)
- Resident Commissioner: Pedro Pierluisi (until January 3), Jenniffer González (starting January 3)

== Events ==
- 2 January – the 26th Senate and the 30th House of Representatives will meet from January 2, 2017 to January 1, 2021
- 11 June – In a referendum on its status, Puerto Ricans vote in favor of statehood amid a historically low turnout. This figure is attributed to a boycott led by the pro-status quo PPD party.
- 20 September – Hurricane Maria makes landfall over Puerto Rico, causing extensive damage to the power grid. Hurricane Maria death toll controversy resulted from the number of dead being underreported by officials. Total losses are estimated at $94.4 billion.

=== Sport ===
- February–March – the 2017 Bayamon Cup organized by the Puerto Rican Football Federation
- March – The Puerto Rico national baseball team was the runner up in the 2017 World Baseball Classic

== Deaths ==
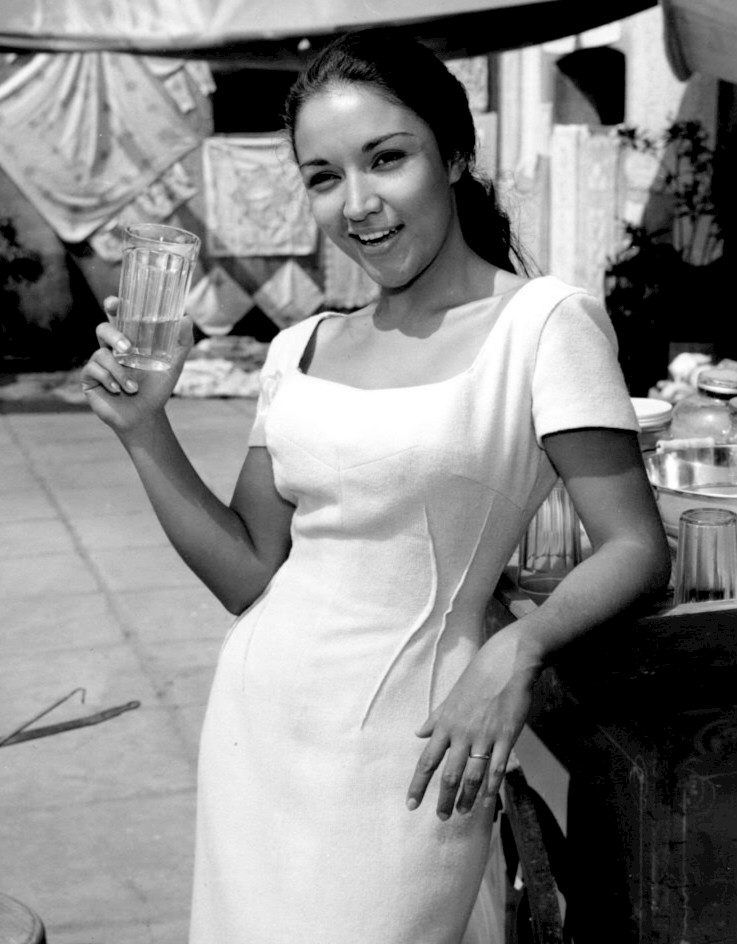
Míriam Colón in 1962

- 3 March – Míriam Colón, actress and theatre director (b. 1936).
- 28 April – Luis Olmo, baseball player (b. 1919)
- 16 June – Héctor Cardona, sports executive (b. 1936)
