= Asian Puerto Ricans =

Total population
- 6,831

Regions with significant populations
- Puerto Rico

Languages
- Puerto Rican Spanish • Puerto Rican English • Spanglish • Asian languages

Religion
- Christianity • Islam • Hinduism

Related ethnic groups
- Asian Caribbean • other Asian Latin Americans

Asian Puerto Ricans (Spanish: Puertorriqueños Asiáticos) are Puerto Ricans who trace their ancestry to the continent of Asia, mostly from China, India, Japan, Lebanon and Syria (see Arab).

As of 2010, people of Asian descent are a small minority in Puerto Rico that constitutes 0.2% of the population.

== See also ==
- Asian Americans
- Chinese immigration to Puerto Rico
- Indo-Caribbean
