= Joe Hatton =

Puerto Rican basketball player (1948–2022)

Joe Hatton Gotay (May 17, 1948 in Ponce, Puerto Rico – July 1, 2022) was a Puerto Rican basketball player who competed in the 1968 Summer Olympics and in the 1972 Summer Olympics.
