= Buddhism in Puerto Rico =

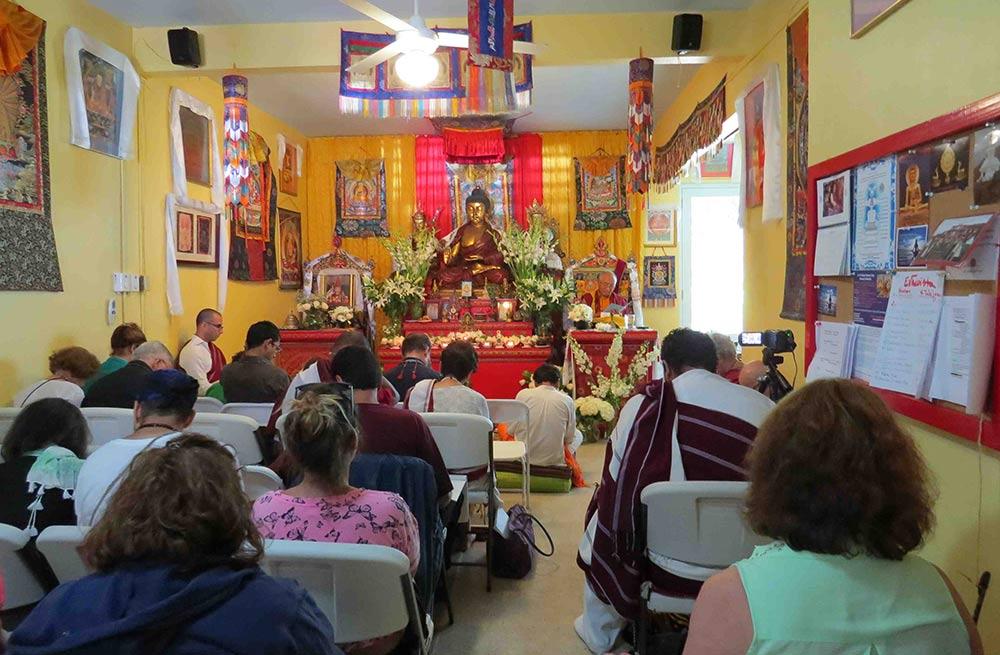
Centro Budista Padmasambhava in Santurce

Buddhism in Puerto Rico is represented by two of the three major Buddhist branches: Mahayana and Vajrayana. Buddhism first arrived in Puerto Rico in the 19th century when Chinese immigrants arrived in the island either as railroad and infrastructure workers, or as a result of the Chinese Exclusion Act of 1882, which caused many Chinese Americans to flee to the then Spanish territory. Puerto Rican Buddhists come from diverse national origins, ethnicities and racial backgrounds, following trends similar to those in the United States, Europe and Latin America. Although there is a high diversity of traditions today, the number of Buddhists in Puerto Rico is not as large as in other jurisdictions and its number of practitioners fluctuates between 7,348 and 10,000, representing 0.2-0.3% of the population of Puerto Rico.

== History ==
The Buddhist Federation of Puerto Rico (Spanish: Federación Budista de Puerto Rico) was created in 2017 with the goal of assisting all Puerto Rican Buddhists in organizing community events, providing active representation in the state and municipal governments, bringing the Dharma into areas outside of the San Juan metropolitan area, and promoting the communication and relations between all existing Buddhist schools and traditions in Puerto Rico.

== Mahayana Buddhism ==
Although no Chinese Buddhist institutions existed at the time, Mahayana Buddhism was the first Buddhist tradition to arrive to Puerto Rico in the form of Chinese immigration to the island in the 19th century.

=== Japanese Buddhism ===
Zen Buddhism is the largest Mahayana tradition in Puerto Rico. The largest Zen monastery in Puerto Rico is the Zen Center of Puerto Rico (Centro Zen de Puerto Rico), located near the highest point of San Juan in barrio Caimito. Eiren-ji (Templo del Loto Eterno, also known as Templo Tendai de Puerto Rico; Japanese: 永蓮寺), an offshoot of the Jiunzan Tendaiji and the Tendai Betsuin in New York, is the main Tendai school institution in Puerto Rico, both serving the local Japanese and Puerto Rican communities. Additional Japanese Buddhist organization exist in Bayamón (Rinzai) and Cabo Rojo (Jōdo Shinshū). Other existing Japanese traditions include Nichiren, Sōtō and Soka Gakkai.

== Vajrayana Buddhism ==
Vajrayana, also known as Tantric or Esoteric Buddhism, is often classified as a subset of Mahayana, and it occurs in Puerto Rico in the form of Tibetan Buddhism, with three of the four schools represented: Nyingma, Kagyu and Gelug. The Padmasambhava Buddhist Center of Puerto Rico (Centro Budista Padmasambhava de Puerto Rico) in Santurce, an offshoot of the Padmasambhava Buddhist Center of New York, was the first Vajrayana institution to be founded in the island in 1989, and opened to the general public in 1991. Ganden Shedrub Ling Buddhist Center (Centro Budista Ganden Shedrub Ling), located in Río Piedras, is another Tibetan Buddhist institution.

Various important teachers have visited Puerto Rico and given teachings and initiations in the past. For example, Tenzin Gyatso, the 14th Dalai Lama visited Puerto Rico in 2004 as part of an official tour of various Latin American countries, and Rimé teacher Khentrul Rinpoche gave the Kalachakra empowerment in accordance with the endangered Jonang tradition in 2017, the first time this was done in a Spanish-speaking country.

== Contemporary Buddhism ==
The New Kadampa Tradition exists in Puerto Rico in the form of the Kadampa Meditation Center in Ponce.

== See also ==
- Religion in Puerto Rico
