= Chinese immigration to Puerto Rico =

Began during the 19th century

Chinese Puerto Ricans
Total population
- 1,757 (0.06% of Puerto Rico's population; 2018 estimates, U.S. Census)

Regions with significant populations
- San Juan

Languages
- Spanish • Chinese (especially Cantonese and Hakka)

Religion
- Buddhism • Christianity

Related ethnic groups
- Asian Puerto Rican

Large-scale Chinese immigration to Puerto Rico (Spanish: Puertorriqueños chinos) and the Caribbean began during the 19th century. Chinese immigrants had to face different obstacles that prohibited or restricted their entry in Puerto Rico. When Puerto Rico was a Spanish colony, the Spanish government did encourage settlers of non-Hispanic origin. Although the Spanish government changed its policy with the passage of the Royal Decree of Graces (Real Cédula de Gracias) of 1815, the decree was intended to attract non-Hispanic Europeans who were willing to swear their allegiance to the Roman Catholic Church, not non-Christian Asians. Several imprisoned Chinese were brought from Cuba, having been jailed there for acts of vengeance against the Spanish hacendados that did not honor their agreements. Of these, over 350 were brought to the island, beginning on August 1, 1865. For more than ten years a Chinese brigade worked on building the Carretera Central. Others worked on similar construction projects.

Of those that stayed after their sentence, the bulk remained at San Juan, but some dispersed throughout the island. Many worked at the culinary arts, but others mingled in other industries. At Coamo a pantheon was built, in which non-Catholic Chinese were buried. Chinese restaurants existed at San Juan since the 19th Century. After Spain was forced to cede Puerto Rico to the United States in accordance to the Treaty of Paris of 1898, Chinese immigrants were confronted with the United States' passage of the Chinese Exclusion Act (1882), which forbade the entry and immigration of Chinese nationals to the United States and its territories. After 1943, when the Chinese Exclusion Act was repealed and particularly in the 1950s, when hundreds of Cuban Chinese fled Cuba after Fidel Castro came to power, many more Chinese immigrants went to Puerto Rico. There are about 1,757 people of Chinese descent in Puerto Rico, as per the 2018 U.S. Census estimates. This number could be higher, especially when taking into consideration those with partial Chinese ancestry, descending from multicultural Puerto Rican-Chinese families.

== Spanish immigration restrictions ==
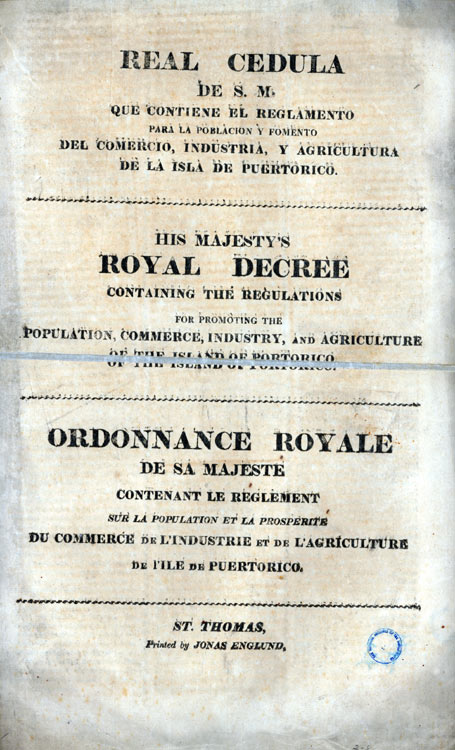
Royal Decree of Graces, 1815

By the 19th century, the Spanish Crown had lost most of its possessions in the Americas. Two of its remaining possessions were Puerto Rico and Cuba, which were demanding more autonomy and had pro-independence movements. The Spanish Crown issued the Royal Decree of Graces (Real Cédula de Gracias) which was originated August 10, 1815, with the intention of attracting Europeans of non-Spanish origin to the islands. The Spanish government, believing that the independence movements would lose their popularity, granted land and initially gave settlers "Letters of Domicile". The decree applied only to the people of Europe, since it was expected that the settlers would swear loyalty to the Spanish Crown and allegiance to the Roman Catholic Church.

Bringing in Asian immigrants to join the workforce in Puerto Rico was first proposed in 1846, but was ignored by the colonial government. Six years later, the matter was reconsidered and Governor Fernando de Norzagaray was tasked with assessing the proposal. After meeting with local and Cuban figures, the functionary issued a favorable opinion. As a necessity for agricultural needs was established, hacendados were to be allowed to bring workers. A prolonged bureaucratic process followed, outlasting the administration, time during which José Julián Acosta publicly opposed it while newspaper El Ponceño lobbied in favor. On May 13, 1855, the British vessel Carpentaria docked at Puerto Rico with a notable quantity of Chinese workers, but these were not employed, while the local Asian population remained minimal. By 1856, relevant meetings were held between governor José Lemery e Ibarrola, military, political and religious figures. A law was drafted to bring in culíes (strictly not Chinese) and the fulfillment of contractual obligations, penalties, government involvement and christianization of the immigrants were among the priorities, as was ensuring that Asians and blacks did not clash between them. Ultimately, however, there was not much interest among Puerto Rican hacendados and proved controversial, attracting opposition from the United Kingdom and France as well as worsening the local debate. Despite this, Casa Prats Tirado y Compañía attempted to get permission to bring 400-600 Chinese workers on May 14, 1857.

In the early 1860s, Acosta, when commenting on Fray Íñigo Abbad y Lasierra's written history of Puerto Rico (which recorded events until the latter part of the 18th century), wrote a footnote in which he praises the local Spanish government for rejecting a proposal that would have allowed Chinese laborers to come to Puerto Rico from Trinidad and Tobago and Suriname. These restrictions were lifted in the latter part of the century. In 1865, a commission led by Acosta, Segundo Ruiz Belvis, Francisco Mariano Quiñones and Manuel Zeno Correa agreed that bringing in Chinese workers would not be favorable. The former argued that those brought in as prisoners from Samaná had been committing crimes punished by the death penalty at an extraordinary rate. A questionnaire also displayed the negative perception of the Spanish authorities towards the group. The topic would be touched upon again during the late 1870s, when rumors began circulating that an attempt to bring Chinese workers was underway or that a group was coming in from Cuba.

During the 19th Century, over 300 Chinese were sent to Puerto Rico to complete their jail sentences. Most of these were brought from the Dominican Republic, where they had been sent from Cuba, where they rebelled and murdered Spaniards after being abused while working as indentured contractors. This trend was first recorded on July 1, 1865, when Chinese prisoners were brought from Samaná after the Spanish occupation of that country ended. The first group, distinguished by their youth and the Hispanic names imposed on them upon arriving to the new world, had been jailed for ten years and banished for the death of foreman Manuel Segarra. A number of them died in custody and most were given non-Catholic burials in spaces separated from the general populace (at Coamo, where many spent time working, space was destined for those that still practiced their original religion). Of the minority (aprox. 9), that was given a life sentence, some gained favor and were released. Others rebelled as they had at Cuba, either attacking the authorities or fleeing, receiving a variety of sentences that included additional time, lashing and the death penalty.

Most were sent to join their compatriots working on the Carretera Central while submissive ones were awarded with positions of trust. Despite sharing a place of origin, most were Cantonese, they were classified by the tonality of their skin and other distinctive traits, such as the scars or missing body parts receives while under Spanish hacendados at Cuba. The Carretera Central which was called the "best road in the American hemisphere" during the final decade and a half of the 19th Century by journalist William Dinwiddie and connected the capital of San Juan with the southern epicenter of Ponce. Chinese prisoners were tasked with the hardest tasks, those that could not be given to free men, first divided in three brigades which were later joined by a fourth. They were tasked with completing the municipalities of Caguas, Cayey, Aibonito and Coamo, proving the capacity of quickly assimilating unfamiliar construction practices in the latter. In February 1875, a group was involved in quelling a fire at Aibonito. On May 5, 1878, a man known only as "Priseo" was the first to complete his sentence. Several dozen returned to Cuba (despite some having been legally banished) or were licensed. Most that remained in Puerto Rico settled in the capital. Most (134) of the prisoners held during these two decades completed their sentence, while 70 died in custody and others being discharged from work due to illness. Suicidal tendencies were still present from their time at Cuba, where the rate was first in the world in great part due to indentured workers, with a number killing themselves after arriving at Puerto Rico. Some opted to become Catholic (under a "Christian" name) and others were baptized at death, an act that guaranteed a decent burial place.

Some Puerto Rican authorities (as well as some Peninsular figures like Felipe Méndez de Vigo) were sympathetic towards the prisoners and made moves to have their sentences lifted, such as an initiative to release 70 in 1881 and other requests for pardons arranged by the governor. The following year, Cheng Jiao Ju began arrangements to be know the condition of Chinese citizens in Spanish jails, including those at Puerto Rico, but was unable to have their sentences commuted due to being imprisoned on homicide charges. Once freed, most Chinese performed menial jobs such as cooking, some even in the prison itself. One of them, Gaspar Reyes, served as the cook of the San Juan bishop for years. Despite their past convictions for homicide, in Puerto Rico they were mostly perceived as exemplary citizens. They were, however, monitored by the authorities for some time after being released. Free Chinese also began fondas, small inns where food was provided. There were cultural clashes that on occasion resulted on violence from both sides.

Chinese prisoners were also employed in other building projects during the 1880s, including the Culebrita lighthouse and in the manufacture of bricks at Ponce. By the 1890s, they were given other tasks, as gardening. During the latter part of the 19th century, Spain and the rest of the Americas became industrialized and were in need of manpower to fulfill their workforces. Poor and uneducated men, driven by war and starvation, made their way from China to the Americas as laborers. A large number of these unskilled workers were sold in what became known as the "coolie" trade. Puerto Rico, Cuba and the Dominican Republic were the last stop for many of the "coolies" before reaching their final destinations. Many of these Chinese immigrants stayed in Puerto Rico and the other two Caribbean countries.

On October 15, 1898, Spain (devastated by the Spanish-American War) released the final four prisoners, which had received the life sentence. When after the Treaty of Paris (1898), the U.S. conducted its first census of Puerto Rico, the Chinese population was large enough to require a mention in the document on how to punch the census card: "If the record related to a white person, B, standing for blanco (white) was punched, while N was punched for a negro, or M for Mixed, Ch for Chinese, etc."

== 20th century ==
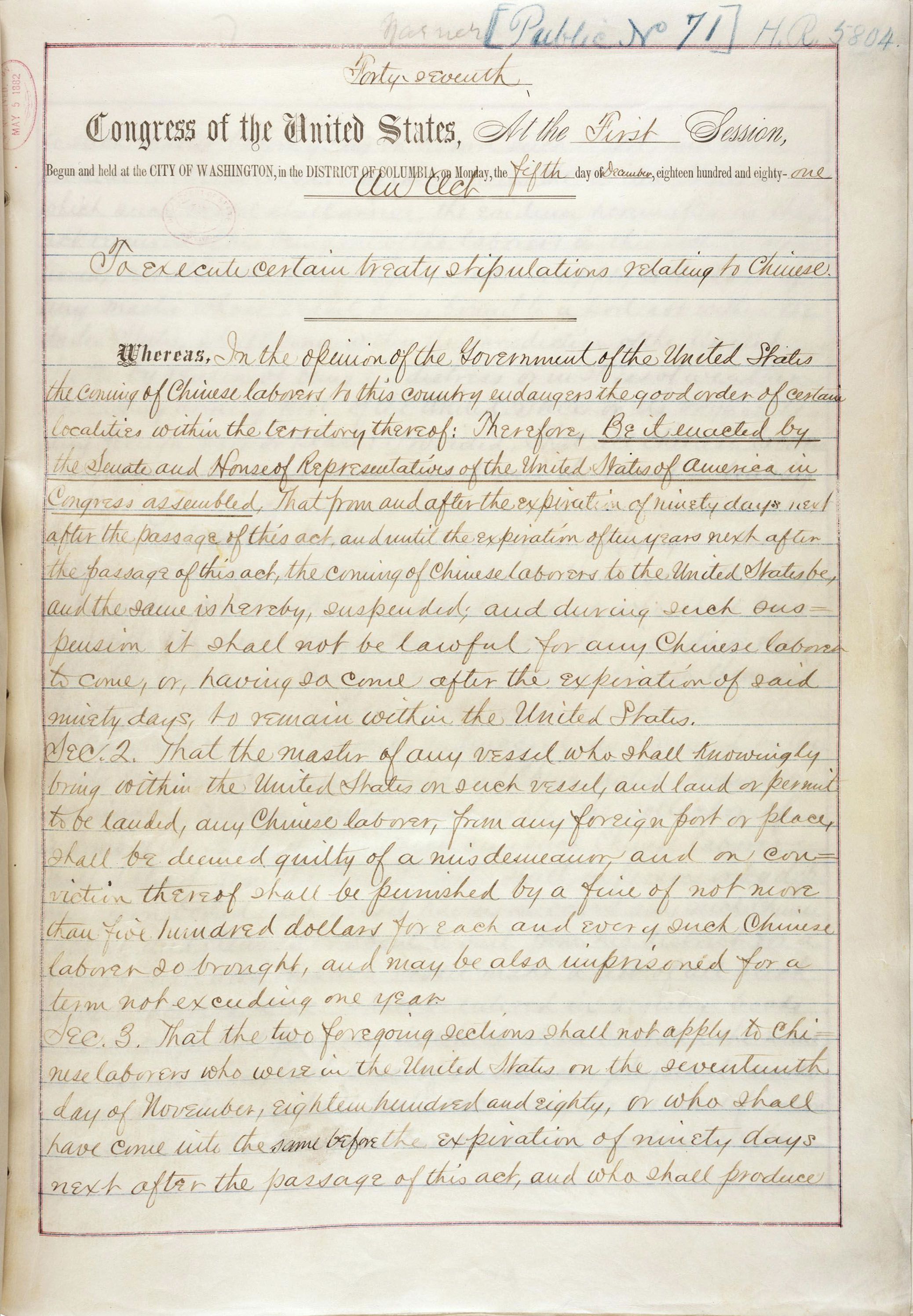
The first page of the Chinese Exclusion Act.

When the United States enacted the Chinese Exclusion Act on May 6, 1882, many Chinese in the United States fled to Puerto Rico, Cuba and other Latin American nations. They established small niches and worked in restaurants and laundries. The Chinese Exclusion Act was a United States federal law which implemented the suspension of Chinese immigration. After the Spanish–American War, Spain ceded Puerto Rico to the United States under the conditions established by the Treaty of Paris of 1898. Chinese workers in the United States were allowed to travel to Puerto Rico. Some worked in the island's sugar industry, but most worked in re-building Puerto Rico's infrastructure and rail systems. Many of the workers in Puerto Rico decided to settle permanently in the island.

One of the reasons that the Chinese community in Puerto Rico did not flourish was because, in 1899, the War Department ordered the American officials in Puerto Rico to enforce the Chinese exclusion laws, as requested by the U.S. Secretary of the Treasury. They believed that Chinese agents were preparing to flood Puerto Rico with Chinese from other countries, who would eventually move on into the United States later. Although Chinese nationals were not allowed to go from Cuba to Puerto Rico, those who were in the United States were permitted to travel back and forth between the United States and Puerto Rico without restrictions. These laws were officially extended to the archipelago in 1904, following the continued pressure by the American Departments of Treasury and War (which by 1902 had forced any Chinese to receive a certificate to confirm their residence), remaining in place until asylum was offered to citizens of communist countries.

In March 1914, four Chinese members of the Norhilda's crew were detained at Guánica, submitted to trial, found guilty and jailed at Mayagüez. The captain, S.H. Cook, had not paid the $500 fee and provided the information mandatory to be allowed to land despite the Chinese Exclusion Act. He was jailed upon returning to Puerto Rico. The Chinese, however, opposed being deported to China and filed a lawsuit (United States v. Low Ding), being instead allowed to return to the Dominican Republic. In July 1939, two Chinese were detained on substance possession due to disembarking while carrying opium with them. They were, however, allowed to remain in conditional freedom. The Chinese Exclusion Act was repealed by the 1943 Chinese Exclusion Repeal Act, although large-scale Chinese immigration did not occur until the passage of the Immigration Act of 1965.

In 1959, thousands of business-minded Chinese fled Cuba, after the success of the Cuban Revolution led by Fidel Castro. One of the results of the communist revolution was that the state took over private property and nationalized all private-owned businesses. Most of the Cuban Chinese fled overseas and, among the places where many of them settled, were Puerto Rico, Miami and New York City. This pattern continued during the following decades. This group actively developed businesses and became involved in the economy. By the 1970s, Chinese-style ice cream parlors and acupuncture salons, which faced some resistance by local regulation bodies, had gained popularity. Other professionals entered local institutions, such as K. S. Koo joining the Centro Nuclear de Puerto Rico. By the 1980s, there were at least 1,990 Chinese immigrants in Puerto Rico.

During the 1990s, a third wave arrived. Only trailing Dominicans as the most populous group of illegal immigrants, these were smuggled from foreign countries (notably the Dominican Republic) by sea. As was the case with the United States, women were brought by international crime syndicates for sexual exploitation. A number of these illegal Chinese nationals were jailed in relation to this. Entering the 2000s, there were at least 1,873 Chinese immigrants in Puerto Rico (not counting those illegally in the jurisdiction), a number that ballooned to 2,187 a decade later. Most of these were males.

== Chinese influence in Puerto Rico ==
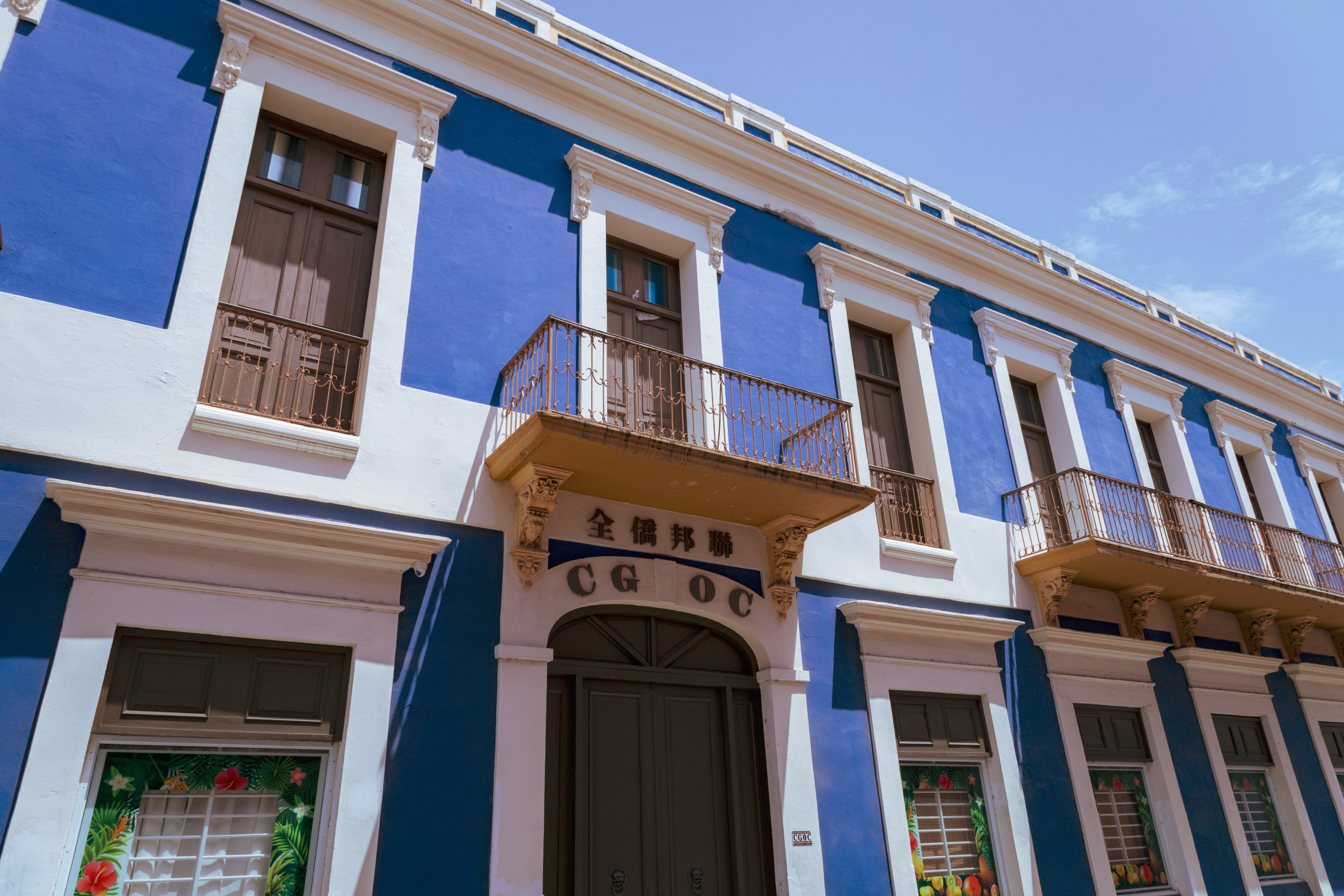
Former Club Chino (Club Gimnástico y Oriental de China) of Ponce

Chinese Puerto Ricans are involved in operating Chinese restaurants, and others work in other sectors. Many members of Puerto Rico's Chinese minority have integrated both Puerto Rican and Chinese cultures into their daily lives. Some Chinese have intermarried with Puerto Ricans and many of today's Chinese-Puerto Ricans have Hispanic surnames and are of mixed Chinese and Puerto Rican descent, e.g., Wu-Trujillo.

Various businesses are named Los Chinos (The Chinese) and a valley in Maunabo, Puerto Rico is called Quebrada Los Chinos (The Chinese Stream). The Padmasambhava Buddhist Center, whose followers practice Tibetan Buddhism, has a branch in Puerto Rico.

Los Chinos de Ponce (English: "The Chinese from Ponce"), formally "King's [Ice] Cream", is an ice cream store whose owners are descendants of Chinese immigrants who arrived in Puerto Rico via Cuba in the early 1960s. The ice cream parlor, which is in front of the town square, Plaza Las Delicias, opposite the historic Parque de Bombas, opened in 1964. In addition, some well known Puerto Ricans have Asian ancestry, such as actor, singer and lawyer Raulito Carbonell (Raul Carbonell Huo, who has Chinese ancestry on his mother's side)

Illegal immigration of Chinese nationals became a problem in Puerto Rico. On November 28, 2007, the United States Immigration and Customs Enforcement (ICE) announced that 15 citizens of the People's Republic of China were arrested and indicted for human smuggling. According to the indictment, the defendants participated in an alien smuggling organization operating out of the Dominican Republic and Puerto Rico. The organization was transporting, moving, concealing, harboring and shielding aliens. They arranged the transportation and moving of Chinese nationals from the Dominican Republic into the United States. By the 2010s, there were approximately 17,000 Chinese residents and more than 600 restaurants throughout Puerto Rico. The modern community is distinctively secretive and well organized (usually relying on its own sources for religious, medical and commercial needs) and retains the practice of ancestral traditions.

== Common Chinese surnames ==
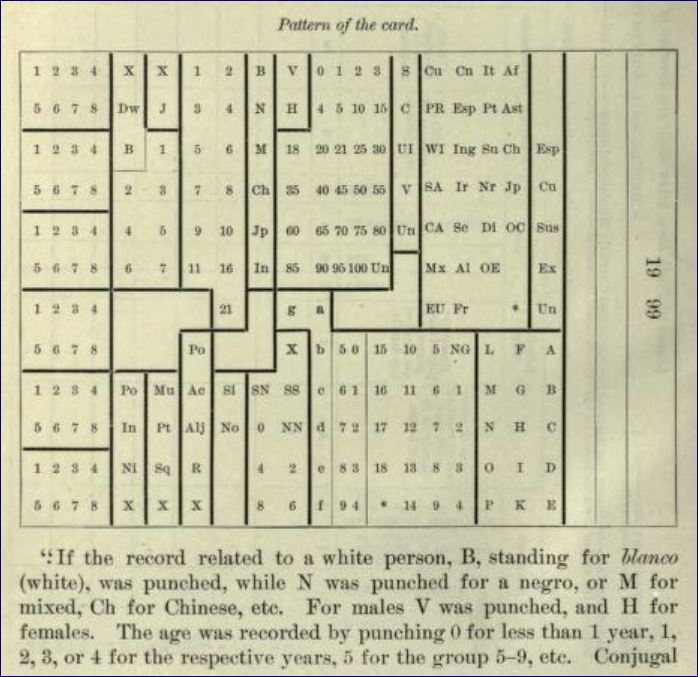
Census punch card for electronic tabulated census of Puerto Rico in 1899 by the U.S., with "Ch" for Chinese

The following are Chinese surnames of Chinese who have immigrated to Puerto Rico:

- Chang
- Chin
- Joa
- Lao
- Lee
- Mas
- Wong
- Woo
- Wu
- Yan
- Yon

American census places the Chinese population in Puerto Rico as a constant variable going from 75 in 1899 to only 12 in 1910 and from 32 in 1920 to 23 in 1930. This period also marked the introduction of arrivals from abroad that were not prisoners. Those that remained continued assimilating into local culture and taking up its customs, physical traits, location names and the nickname "Chino" have survived the test of time. Numerical last names such as Primero and Segundo were derived from the numbers used to differentiate the Chinese upon arrival and exist to this day.

== Influence ==
=== Cultural clashes, politics and media ===
By the 1890s, the Puerto Rican media (such as La Revista de Puerto Rico and El Diario de Puerto Rico) was publishing pieces on Chinese tradition and how it contrasted with European customs. The education system of China was a topic of discussion since the 1880s. Other aspects like the celebration of the Chinese New Year's, population, marriage traditions, religion, sayings, press, gender roles, isolationism, agriculture, slavery, piracy, military, literature, politics, language, customary clothing, daily practices and the inner workings of the empire also drew curiosity and were often incorrectly portrayed. Chinese billiards were frowned upon, believing that they promoted unproductivity.

Stereotypes imported from abroad concerning the feeding habits, hygiene or medical prowess of the Chinese also found their way to Puerto Rico through the media by the late 19th Century, which presented China as an exotic locale and exaggerated the figure of the emperor, affecting the perception of the population towards them and the fondas, tough to a lease extent than at Cuba and the United States. Still a novelty and distinctly foreign, both China and the Chinese were used in ads, both commercial and political. As jíbaros began migrating and falling prey to fraud, Chinese were presented in a sympathetic light in the Puerto Rican press as they had experienced similar situations in their arrival to the Americas. The Chinese community at Puerto Rico has been the subject of dubious depictions in more recent times, including a claim published by El Vocero in 1995 claiming the presence of a "Chinese mafia" (the Triads). American stereotypes have also found their way into local popular culture. The idiom Es un cuento chino (lit. "It’s a Chinese tale") is still used to describe a dubious statement, a vestige of the way in which they were represented.

=== Academia ===
Within academia, the study of Chinese immigration to Puerto Rico, their contributions and social roles is notably underdeveloped.

== See also ==
- List of Puerto Ricans
- Buddhism in Puerto Rico
- Cultural diversity in Puerto Rico
- Overseas Chinese
- Chinatowns in Latin America
- Chinatowns in the United States
- Chinese Americans
