= Iris M. Zavala =

Puerto Rican writer (1936–2020)

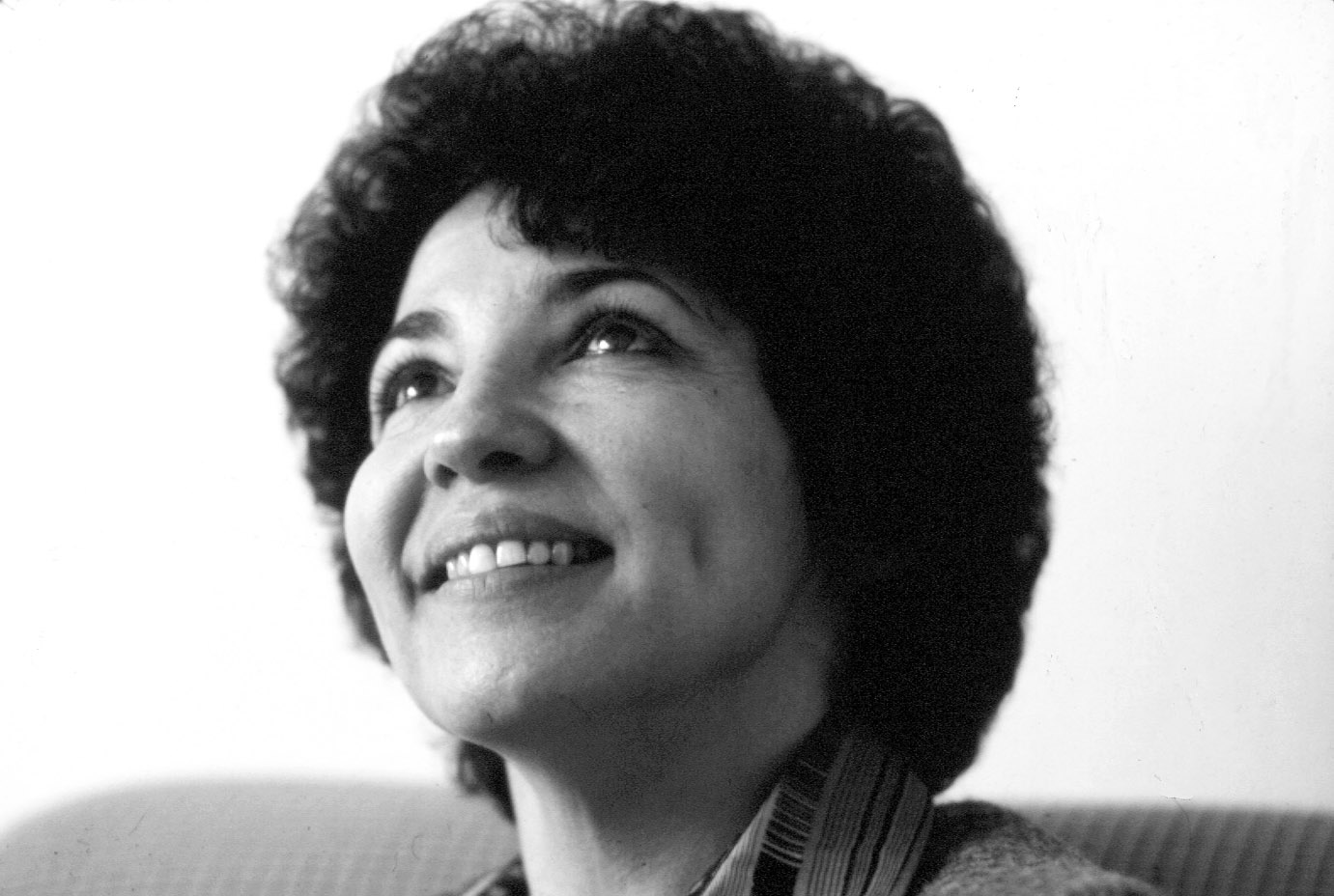
- Born: 27 December 1936; Ponce, Puerto Rico
- Died: 10 April 2020 (aged 83); Madrid, Spain
- Occupations: scholar, writer, and poet
- Writing career
- Subjects: Puerto Rican political independence, women's themes
- Notable works: Kiliagonía; Unamuno y su teatro de conciencia; Noctura mas no funesta; Intellectual Roots of Puerto Rican Independence; El bolero. Historia de un amor
- Notable awards: Decorated by King Juan Carlos I of Spain. "Encomienda, Lazo de Dama de la Orden de Mérito Civil." 1988; Medal of Honor, Instituto de Cultura Puertorriqueña, San Juan, Puerto Rico, April 1994.; Doctor Honoris Causa, University of Puerto Rico, June 1996.; Gold Medal, Ateneo Puertorriqueño. 1998.; Cátedra UNESCO de Estudios Latinoamericanos, Universidad Pompeu Fabra, 2001; Honorary Doctoral degree, Universidad de Málaga. 2004.; María Zambrano Thought Award, Junta de Andalucía. 2006.; Pen Club Award (based on "El libro de Apolonia o de las islas".

Iris M. Zavala (27 December 1936 – 10 April 2020) was a Puerto Rican author, scholar, and poet, who later lived in Barcelona, Spain. She had over 50 works to her name, plus hundreds of articles, dissertations, and conferences and many of her writings, including "Nocturna, mas no funesta", build on and express this belief.

She died from COVID-19 in Madrid during COVID-19 pandemic in Spain, at the age of 83.

== Early years ==
Zavala was born on 27 December 1936 in Ponce, Puerto Rico. She graduated from the University of Puerto Rico with a B.A. in literature and from the University of Salamanca with a "Licenciatura" degree as well as a "Doctor en Filosofía y Letras" (Ph.D.). There, she was influenced by Spain's Fernando Lázaro Carreter.

== Career ==
Zavala taught in Puerto Rico, Mexico, the United States, the Netherlands, Italy, Germany, and Spain. In Spain she was a UNESCO fellow at the University Pompeu Fabra in Barcelona, and a Ramon Llull fellow at the University of the Balearic Islands in Mallorca. Zavala taught in many universities in the United States, including the University of Minnesota.

She was also a literary critic and essayist. In 1980, she wrote her masterpiece, "Kiliagonía", a Ponce city novel. Her second novel was "Nocturna, mas no funesta" (1987), published by Montesinos (Barcelona, Spain). It was adapted for a theatrical interpretation by Group Alcores (Madrid). Other works include "El libro de Apolonia o de las Islas" and "El sueño del amor".

== Books ==
Following is a list of the publications by Zavala:

- 1963
  - 1. Unamuno y su teatro de conciencia. Acta Saltmanticensia: University of Salamanca, 222 pp.
- 1965
  - 2. La angustia y el hombre. Ensayos de literatura española. Mexico: Universidad Veracruzana, 224 pp.
  - 3. Barro doliente (Poetry). Santander: La Isla de los Ratones
- 1970
  - 4. La Revolución de 1868. Historia, pensamiento, literatura, ed. with Clara E. Lida. New York: Las Americas.
  - 5. Masones, comuneros y carbonarios. Madrid: Siglo XXI, 363 pp.
- 1971
  - 6. Ideología y política en la novela española del siglo XIX. Madrid: Anaya, 362 pp.
- 1972
  - 7. Poemas prescindibles (Poetry). New York: Anti-ediciones Villa Miseria.
  - 8. Románticos y socialistas. Prensa española en el siglo XIX. Madrid: Siglo XXI, 205 pp.
- 1973
  - 9. Libertad y crítica en el ensayo puertorriqueño, intr., ed.Con R. Rodríguez. Puerto Rico: Puerto, 448 pp.
- 1974
  - 10. Escritura desatada (Poetry). Puerto Rico: Puerto.
  - 11. Fin de siglo:Modernismo, 98 y bohemia. Madrid: Cuadernos para el Diálogo.
- 1977
  - 12. Alejandro Sawa, Iluminaciones en la sombra, ed. estudio, notas. Madrid: Alhambra. 2@ ed.1986
- 1978
  - 13. Clandestinidad y libertinaje erudito en los albores del siglo XVIII. Barcelona: Ariel, 459 pp.
- 1979
  - 14. Historia social de la literatura española, in coll. C.Blanco Aguinaga, J. Rodríguez Puértolas. Madrid: Castalia, 3 vols. (revised ed. 1983, many reprints); reed. Madrid:Akal, 2001.
  - 15. Intellectual Roots of Puerto Rican Independence, coll with R. Rodríguez. New York: Monthly Review Press (revised ed. and translation of 1973)
- 1981
  - 16. El texto en la historia. Madrid: Nuestra Cultura, 259 pp.
- 1982
  - 17. Romanticismo y realismo. vol. 5 Historia y crítica de la literatura española. Barcelona: Crítica, 1982, 741pp (many reprints)
  - 18. Kiliagonía (novel). Mexico: Premià (trans.Chiliagony. Indiana University: Third Woman Press, 1985)
- 1983
  - 19. Que nadie muera sin amar el mar (poetry). Madrid: Visor.
  - 20. El siglo XVIII, spec. issue, Nueva Revista de Filología Hispánica XXXII:1.
- 1984
  - 21. Women, Feminist Identity and Society in the 1980s, ed. Con M. Díaz-Diocaretz. Amsterdam: John Benjamins, 138 pp.
- 1987
  - 22. Lecturas y lectores del discurso narrativo dieciochesco. Amsterdam: Rodopi, 118 pp.
  - 23. Noctura mas no funesta (novel). Barcelona:Montesinos.
  - 24. Approaches to Discourse, Poetics and Psychiatry, ed. with Teun van Dijk, M. Díaz-Diocaretz. Amsterdam: John Benjamins, 235 pp.
- 1989
  - 25. Romanticismo y costumbrismo. Madrid: Espasa-Calpe (Historia de España, t.35, vol. II), 183 pp.
  - 26. Rubén Darío bajo el signo del cisne. Universidad de Puerto Rico, 153 pp.
  - 27. El modernismo y otros ensayos del Rubén Darío, ed. intr.Madrid: Alianza.
- 1990
  - 28. La musa funambulesca. Poética de la carnavalización en Valle-Inclán. Madrid: Orígenes, 175 pp.
- 1991
  - 29. Unamuno y el pensamiento dialógico. M. de Unamuno y M.Bajtin. Barcelona: Anthropos, 207 pp.
  - 30. La posmodernidad y M. Bajtin. Una poética dialógica. Madrid: Espasa Calpe, 277 pp.
  - 31. El bolero. Historia de un amor (creative fiction). Madrid: Alianza, 162 pp.; reed. Aumentada y corregida, Madrid:Celeste, 2000.
- 1992
  - 32. Colonialism and Culture:Hispanic Modernisms and the Social Imaginary, Indiana University Press, 240 pp.
  - 33. Discursos sobre la 'invención' de América, ed. intr. Amsterdam: Rodopi.
  - 34. El libro de Apolonia o de las islas (novel). Puerto Rico: Instituto de Cultura.
  - 35. Discurso erótico y discurso transgresor en la cultura peninsular. Siglos XVI al XX, ed. with M.Díaz-Diocaretz, Madrid: Tuero, 1992.
  - 36. Breve historia feminista de la litertura española (en lengua castellana). 1. Teoría feminista:discursos y differencia, ed with M.Díaz-Diocaretz. Barcelona:Anthropos.
- 1993
  - 37. Historia y crítica de la literatura española. 5/1 Romanticismo y Realismo, ed. Primer Suplemento. Barcelona:Crítica.
- 1995
  - 38. Historia feminista de la literatura española (en lengua castellana). II. La mujer en la literatura española, ed. Barcelona:Anthropos, 1995.
- 1996
  - 39. Bajtin y sus apócrifos, ed. with T. Bubnova, S.Bocharov, N. Pedgorced, Amalia Rodriguez Monroy. Barcelona:Anthropos.
  - 40. Escuchar a Bajtin. Barcelona: Montesinos.
  - 41. Historia feminista de la literatura española (en lengua castellana). III. La mujer en la literatura española (del siglo XVIII a la actualidad).ed. Barcelona Anthropos.
- 1997
  - 42. Historia feminista de la literatura española (en lengua castellana). IV. La Literatura escrita por mujer (De la Edad Media al siglo XVIII). ed. Barcelona:Anthropos.
  - 43. Hacia una filosofía del acto ético. De los borradores y otros escritos, ed. Con comentarios de I. M. Zavala, Augusto Ponzio. Anthropos/Universidad de Puerto Rico.
- 1998
  - 44.El sueño del amor (novela). Universidad de Puerto Rico/Montesinos,
  - 45. Historia feminista de la literatura española (en lengua castellana). V. La literatura escritura por mujer (siglos XIX y XX). Anthropos/Universidad de Puerto Rico.
  - 46. ¿Historia o literatura?, ed. Iris M. Zavala. Núm.Esp. La Torre.
- 2000
  - 47.Feminismos, cuerpos, escrituras. ed Iris M.Zavala.La Página. Canarias
  - 48.El bolero. Historia de un amor, ed.Madrid: Celeste. (2ed. ampliada).
  - 49.Historia social de la literatura española(en lengua castellana)vol I-II.C. Blanco Aguinaga, Julio Rodríguez Puértolas, Iris M. Zavala.Madrid:Akal. Reedición.
  - 50.Breve historia feminista de la literatura española (en lengua catalana, gallega y vasca). vol.VI, ed. Iris M.Zavala. Barcelona: Anthropos.
- 2001
  - 51. El rapto de América y el síntoma de la modernidad. Barcelona:Montesinos.
- 2004.
  - 52. La otra mirada del siglo XX. La mujer en la España del siglo XX. Madrid. La Esfera de los Libros.
- 2006
  - 53. Leer Don Quijote. 7 tesis sobre ética y literatura. Barcelona: Anthropos.
- 2007
  - 54. Percanta que me amuraste. Barcelona:Montesinos (novela)
  - 55. Poesía completa, Canarias:La Página.
  - 56. Kiliagonía.(reed). .Canarias:La Página..
- 2008
  - 57. Alejandro Sawa. Crónicas de la bohemia. Ed. Veintisiete: Madrid.
  - 58. Miguel de Unamuno, ensayos heréticos. Ed. Veintisiete (en prensa).
  - 59. La (Di)famación de la cultura. 7 ensayos sobre ética. Ed. Veintisiete, Madrid.

== Honors and awards ==
- Decorated by King Juan Carlos I of Spain. "Encomienda, Lazo de Dama de la Orden de Mérito Civil." 1988
- Medal of Honor, Instituto de Cultura Puertorriqueña, San Juan, Puerto Rico, April 1994.
- Doctor Honoris Causa, University of Puerto Rico, June 1996.
- Gold Medal, Ateneo Puertorriqueño. 1998.
- Cátedra UNESCO de Estudios Latinoamericanos, Universidad Pompeu Fabra, 2001
- Honorary Doctoral degree, Universidad de Málaga. 2004.
- María Zambrano Thought Award, Junta de Andalucía. 2006.
- Pen Club Award (based on "El libro de Apolonia o de las islas").

Zavala is also honored as one of Ponce's greatest writers at the Park for Illustrious Ponce Citizens.

== See also ==
- List of Puerto Ricans
