= Public holidays in Puerto Rico =

Holidays in Puerto Rico

Puerto Rico celebrates all official U.S. holidays, and other official holidays established by the Commonwealth government. Additionally, many municipalities celebrate their own Patron Saint Festivals (fiestas patronales in Spanish), as well as festivals honoring cultural icons like bomba y plena, danza, salsa, hamacas (hammocks), and popular crops such as plantains and coffee.

Until June 30, 2014, there were 19 public holidays in Puerto Rico. As a result of a new Commonwealth law, after July 1, 2014, the Commonwealth government consolidated three of its former holidays (Luis Muñoz Rivera, José Celso Barbosa, and Luis Muñoz Marín) into just one called Día de los Próceres Puertorriqueños (The Day of Illustrious Puerto Ricans), and reducing the number of holidays observed publicly to 17. As part of the new law, the third Monday of February became Día de los Próceres Puertorriqueños which, in addition to commemorating the birth of those three illustrious Puerto Ricans, will also include commemorating the birthdays of four other illustrious Puerto Ricans – Ramón Emeterio Betances, Román Baldorioty de Castro, Ernesto Ramos Antonini and Luis A. Ferré. The law mandated that the Eugenio María de Hostos holiday and the José de Diego holiday would continue to be observed on their respective days as usual.

== Official public holidays ==
Official public holidays are those recognized by the Commonwealth of Puerto Rico government. All public offices must close. Many businesses also elect to close. These public holidays include both federal and commonwealth-established holidays, since Puerto Rico recognizes all U.S. federal holidays.

Date	English name	Official name in Spanish	Remarks
January 1	New Year's Day	Día de Año Nuevo	As in most countries, this holiday is celebrated with gatherings and fireworks. Although illegal, celebratory gunfire has sometimes led to injuries and even deaths on certain occasions. Official commonwealth and federal holiday.
January 6	Three Kings Day/ Epiphany	Día de Los Reyes	This is a Commonwealth of Puerto Rico official holiday, as well as a religious holiday. It celebrates the Three Wise Men's visit to see the newborn Christ by exchanging gifts. Traditionally, children stack bundles of hay in boxes under their beds for each Wise Man's camel, to then find their boxes exchanged for gifts.
Third Monday of January	Martin Luther King, Jr. Day	Natalicio del Dr. Martin Luther King, Jr.	A federal and commonwealth official holiday.
Third Monday of February	Presidents' Day	Día de Jorge Washington, Día de los Presidentes y el Día de las Mujeres y Hombres Próceres de Puerto Rico (Note: Día de Jorge Washington, Día de los Presidentes y el Día de las Mujeres y Hombres Próceres de Puerto Rico, en honor a la vida y obra de: Teniente Augusto Rodríguez, Eugenio María de Hostos, José de Diego, Luis Muñoz Rivera, José Celso Barbosa, Ramón Emeterio Betances, Román Baldorioty de Castro, Luis Muñoz Marín, Ernesto Ramos Antonini, Don Luis A. Ferré Aguayo, Lola Rodríguez de Tió, Nilita Vientós Gastón, Julia de Burgos, Mariana Bracetti, Ana Roque de Duprey, Luisa Capetillo, María Luisa Arcelay, Sor Isolina Ferré Aguayo, Felisa Rincón de Gautier, María Libertad Gómez Garriga, Roberto Clemente Walker y Rafael Hernández Colón.)	A federal and commonwealth official holiday. Also known as Día de los Presidentes. Some former holidays were merged into this one: Birthday of Eugenio María de Hostos, (Note: Formerly celebrated on the second Monday of January. Eugenio María de Hostos (1839–1903) was a writer and statesman who struggled for Puerto Rican independence and the end to slavery in the late 19th century.) Birthday of Luis Muñoz Marín, (Note: Also celebrated on the third Monday of February. Luis Muñoz Marín (1898–1980) was the first democratically elected governor of Puerto Rico. He founded the Partido Popular Democrático and was instrumental in establishing the Commonwealth status in 1952. He was a noted journalist and poet, and served four terms as governor.) Birthday of José de Diego, (Note: Formerly celebrated on the third Monday of April. José de Diego (1866–1918) was a much-loved poet and political leader. In recent years, the holiday has been celebrated on the third Monday of April.) and Birthday of Luis Muñoz Rivera (Note: Formerly celebrated on the third Monday of July. Don Luis Muñoz Rivera (1859–1916) was a prominent journalist, poet, and politician who advocated independence from Spain and later, the United States. His son Luis Muñoz Marín was the first democratically elected governor of Puerto Rico.)
March 2	American Citizenship Day	Día de la Ciudadanía Americana	A Commonwealth of Puerto Rico holiday. Puerto Ricans have been American Citizens since March 2, 1917.
March 22	Emancipation Day	Día de la Abolición de Esclavitud	A Commonwealth of Puerto Rico official holiday. Slavery was abolished in Puerto Rico in 1873—eight years after the ratification of the Thirteenth Amendment to the United States Constitution, as the Island was still a colony of Spain at the time.
Friday in late March or early April	Good Friday	Viernes Santo	An official public holiday and a religious holiday. (See notes below in the religious holidays section.)
Last Monday of May	Memorial Day	Día de la Conmemoración de los Muertos en la Guerra	A federal and commonwealth official holiday. Also known as Día de la Recordación.
June 19	Juneteenth	(Note: Juneteenth, también conocido como Día de la Liberación o Día de la Emancipación.)	A federal official holiday.
July 4	Independence Day	Día de la Independencia de los Estados Unidos	A federal and commonwealth official holiday.
July 25	Puerto Rico Constitution Day	Día de la Constitución de Puerto Rico	An official Commonwealth of Puerto Rico holiday. (See also Constitution of Puerto Rico.) Formerly called Occupation Day, commemorating the anniversary of the landing of American troops at Guánica in 1898.
July 27	Birthday of José Celso Barbosa	Día de José Celso Barbosa	Commonwealth of Puerto Rico (ELA) holiday. Dr. José Celso Barbosa (1857–1921) was a medical doctor and an early advocate of statehood, founder of the Republican Party on the Island.
First Monday of September	Labor Day	Día del Trabajo	A federal and commonwealth official holiday.
Second Monday of October	Columbus Day	Día de la Raza (Descubrimiento de América)	A federal and commonwealth official holiday.
November 11	Veterans Day	Día del Veterano	A federal and commonwealth official holiday, usually observed at the Puerto Rico National Cemetery. Also known as Día del Armisticio.
November 19	Discovery of Puerto Rico	Día de la Puertorriqueñidad	A Commonwealth of Puerto Rico official holiday. Formerly known as Descubrimiento de Puerto Rico, as Christopher Columbus landed on the northwest coast of Puerto Rico near Aguada on this day in 1493.
Fourth Thursday of November	Thanksgiving Day	Día de Acción de Gracias	A federal and commonwealth official holiday. It marks the beginning of the Holiday (Christmas) season.
December 25	Christmas	Día de Navidad	Official holiday. Also known as Nacimiento del niño Jesús. During Spanish colonial rule (1492 to 1898), Navidad (Christmas in English), marked the Christian ecumenical celebration date of the birth of Jesus of Nazareth. It was not until the development of the commercialization of Christmas, product of the subsequent American colonial rule, that Navidad becomes the delivery day for Papá Noel (Santa Claus). As in the rest of the United States, Papá Noel leaves Navidad presentes (Christmas presents) under the Árbol de Navidad (Christmas tree). This has replaced in large part, but not entirely, the gift giving custom of Puerto Ricans in Three Kings Day. In Puerto Rico the Christmas celebration starts after Thanksgiving and ends in the third week of January, on the last day of the St. Sebastian Street Festival in Old San Juan.

== Religious holidays ==
Date	English name	Local name (in Spanish)	Remarks
January 5	Eve of Epiphany	Víspera de los Tres Reyes Magos	Puerto Rican children leave a box with grass for the camels of the Three Wise Men and a glass of water for the magos themselves.
January 6	Three Kings Day Epiphanys; Twelfth Night	Día de los Tres Reyes Magos	Children find that the camels ate the grass and the Three Kings drank the water left for them the day before. Traditionally the Kings leave presents under the children's beds.
the week before Ash Wednesday	Carnival	Carnaval	Like other Catholic cultures (Brazil, Trinidad, Louisiana), the solemn 40 days of Lent are preceded in Puerto Rico by a massive blow-out with elaborate costumes and parades. In the city of Ponce, in particular, Carnival time means characters in the streets wearing incredible horned-devil masks, called vejigantes.
First day of Lent	Ash Wednesday	Miércoles de Ceniza	Devout Roman Catholics abstain from eating meat or poultry on this day. Many attend church services.
Sunday before Easter Sunday	Palm Sunday	Domingo de Ramos	
Palm Sunday through Easter	Holy Week	Semana Santa	Most schools, colleges, and universities give the complete week as a recess to students.
Friday before Easter	Good Friday	Viernes Santo	This is the most solemn day of the whole year on the island. All businesses close.
Easter	Easter	Domingo de la Resurrección Domingo de Pascuas	
June 24	Saint John's Day	Día de San Juan Bautista Fiestas de San Juan	Since John the Baptist is the patron saint of the Island and the namesake of the capital city (San Juan), his day is widely celebrated by big parties on the beaches on the Eve of St. John's Day (June 23). One tradition is to walk backward into the ocean and fall in 12 times at midnight on the beginning of the 24th.
December 24	Christmas Eve	Nochebuena Día de Nochebuena	Christmas traditions in Puerto Rico include a large supper with families and friends on Christmas Eve, and the Midnight Mass or Misa de Gallo. Anytime during las navidades neighbors and friends make a parranda or asalto, going from house to house singing Puerto Rican Christmas carols. Once everything has been eaten and drunk, the erstwhile 'host' joins the trulla and they all go to somebody else's house to eat and drink.
December 28	Day of the Innocents, Festival of the Masks	Día de los Innocentes Día de las Máscaras en Hatillo	A Christmas season tradition in the town of Hatillo on the north coast. Similar to Mardi Gras "crewes" in Louisiana, teams of friends completely cover cars, trucks, and floats with elaborate frilly decorations, and wearing head-to-toe costumes, while cruising the country roads, and playing practical jokes along the way. There is a not-to-be missed half-day long parade, full of loud noise and brilliant colors. The tricksters commemorate Herod's soldiers and the slaughter of the innocents in Bethlehem.
