= Puerto Rico Constitution Day =

Commemorates the day the Constitution of Puerto Rico was signed into law

- Also called: Día de la Constitución del Estado Libre Asociado
- Observed by: Puerto Rico
- Date: July 25
- Next time: July 25, 2027
- Frequency: annual

Puerto Rico Constitution Day (Spanish: Día de la Constitución), also known as Constitution Day of the Commonwealth of Puerto Rico (Spanish: Día de la Constitución del Estado Libre Asociado de Puerto Rico, lit. 'Constitution of the Free Associated State of Puerto Rico'), is a public holiday in Puerto Rico on July 25 of every year established by Law #1 of August 4, 1952 of the Commonwealth of Puerto Rico. The holiday commemorates the day the Constitution of Puerto Rico, approved on July 3, 1952, was signed into law by Governor Luis Muñoz Marín the same year.

Prior to 1952, July 25 had been a holiday in Puerto Rico, known as "Occupation Day", to commemorate the arrival of United States military forces on July 25, 1898, in an area of the municipality of Yauco that in the early 20th century would become part of the neighboring municipality of Guánica.
