= Outline of Puerto Rico =

U.S. territory in the northeastern Caribbean

The Flag of Puerto Rico

The Coat of Arms of Puerto Rico

The location of Puerto Rico

The following outline is provided as an overview of and topical guide to Puerto Rico:

The Commonwealth of Puerto Rico is a self-governing unincorporated territory of the United States of America located in the northeastern Caribbean, east of the Dominican Republic and west of the Virgin Islands. The commonwealth comprises an archipelago that includes the main island of Puerto Rico and a number of smaller islands and keys, the largest of which are Vieques, Culebra, and Mona. The main island of Puerto Rico is the least extensive but the third most populous of the four Greater Antilles: Cuba, Hispaniola, Jamaica, and Puerto Rico.

Puerto Ricans often call the island Boriquen or Borinquen, its Indigenous Taíno name. The terms boricua and borincano derive from Borinquen, and are commonly used to identify someone of Puerto Rican heritage. The island is also popularly known as "La Isla del Encanto", which translated means "The Island of Enchantment."

== General reference ==
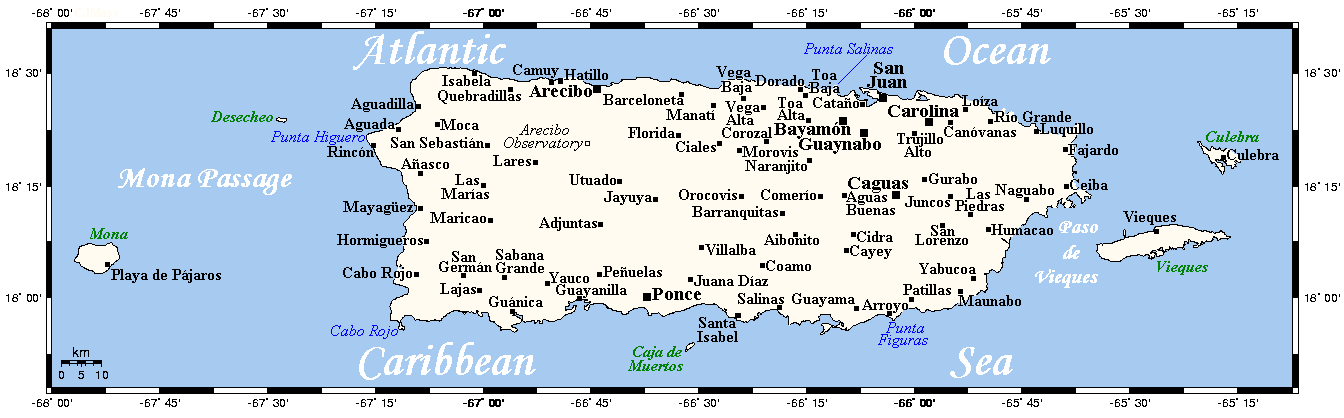
An enlargeable map of the Commonwealth of Puerto Rico

- Pronunciation:
- Common English country name: Puerto Rico
- Official English country name: The Commonwealth of Puerto Rico
- Common endonym(s):
- Official endonym(s):
- Adjectival(s): Puerto Rican
- Demonym(s):
- Etymology: Name of Puerto Rico
- ISO country codes: PR, PRI, 630
- ISO region codes: See ISO 3166-2:PR
- Internet country code top-level domain: .pr

== Geography of Puerto Rico ==
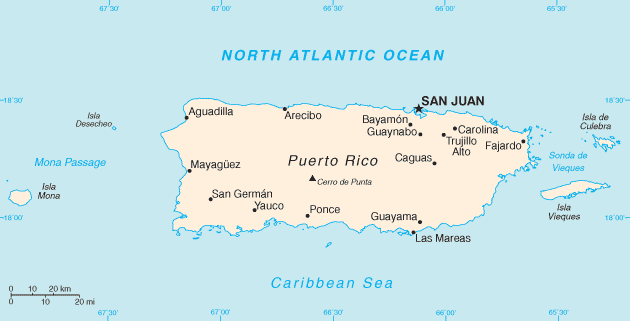
An enlargeable basic map of Puerto Rico

Geography of Puerto Rico

- Puerto Rico is
  - an archipelagic island country (see also List of island countries)
  - a self-governing unincorporated territory of the United States
  - organized as a commonwealth
- Location:
  - Northern Hemisphere and Western Hemisphere
  - North America (though not on the mainland)
  - Atlantic Ocean
  - North Atlantic
  - Caribbean
  - Antilles
  - Greater Antilles
  - Time zone: Eastern Caribbean Time (UTC-04)
  - Extreme points of Puerto Rico
    - High: Cerro de Punta 1,338 m (4,390 ft)
    - Low: Caribbean Sea 0 m
  - Land boundaries: none
  - Coastline: 501 km
- Population of Puerto Rico: 3,285,874 – 31st most populous US jurisdiction
- Area of Puerto Rico: 9,104 km^{2}
- Atlas of Puerto Rico

=== Environment of Puerto Rico ===
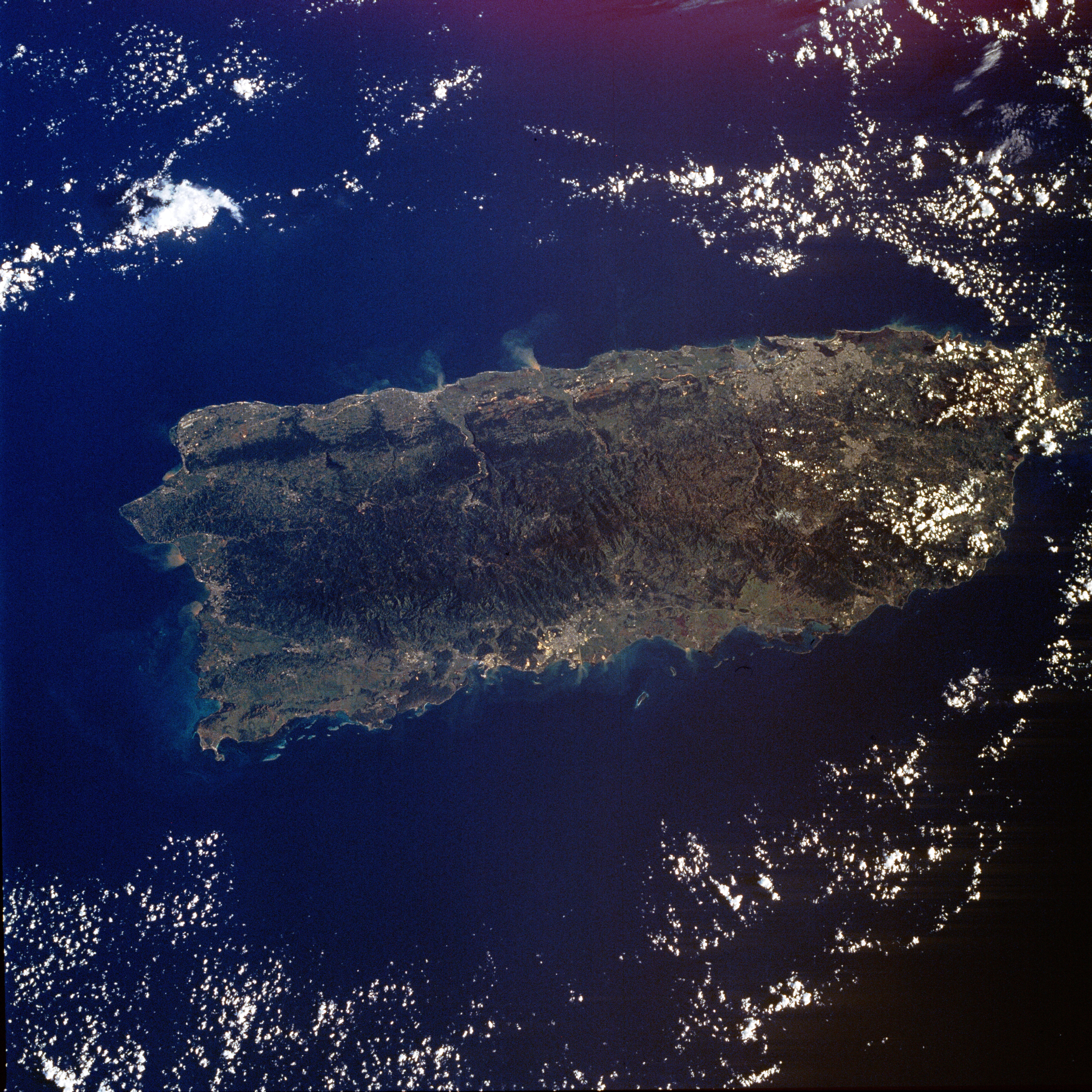
An enlargeable satellite image of Puerto Rico

- Climate of Puerto Rico
- Environmental issues in Puerto Rico
- Renewable energy in Puerto Rico
- Geology of Puerto Rico
- Protected areas of Puerto Rico
- Biosphere reserves in Puerto Rico
- National parks of Puerto Rico
- Superfund sites in Puerto Rico
- Wildlife of Puerto Rico
  - Flora of Puerto Rico
  - Fauna of Puerto Rico
  - Birds of Puerto Rico
  - Mammals of Puerto Rico

==== Natural geographic features of Puerto Rico ====
- Beaches in Puerto Rico
- Glaciers: None
- Islands of Puerto Rico
- Lakes of Puerto Rico
- Mountains of Puerto Rico
- Rivers of Puerto Rico
- Waterfalls of Puerto Rico
- Valleys of Puerto Rico
- World Heritage Sites in Puerto Rico

=== Regions of Puerto Rico ===
Regions of Puerto Rico

==== Ecoregions of Puerto Rico ====
List of ecoregions in Puerto Rico

- Ecoregions in Puerto Rico
- Puerto Rican dry forests
- Puerto Rican moist forests

==== Administrative divisions of Puerto Rico ====
Administrative divisions of Puerto Rico

- Barrios of Puerto Rico

===== Municipalities of Puerto Rico =====
Municipalities of Puerto Rico

- Capital of Puerto Rico: San Juan
- Cities of Puerto Rico

=== Demography of Puerto Rico ===
Demographics of Puerto Rico

== Government and politics of Puerto Rico ==
Politics of Puerto Rico

- Form of government:
- Capital of Puerto Rico: San Juan
- Elections in Puerto Rico
- Political parties in Puerto Rico
- Taxation in Puerto Rico

=== Branches of the government of Puerto Rico ===
Government of Puerto Rico

==== Executive branch of the government of Puerto Rico ====
- Head of state: President of the United States, Donald Trump
- Head of government: Governor of Puerto Rico, Jenniffer González-Colón
- Puerto Rico Department of State
- Puerto Rico Department of Economic Development and Commerce

==== Legislative branch of the government of Puerto Rico ====
- Legislative Assembly of Puerto Rico (bicameral)
  - Upper house: Senate of Puerto Rico
  - Lower house: House of Representatives of Puerto Rico

==== Judicial branch of the government of Puerto Rico ====
Court system of Puerto Rico

- Supreme Court of Puerto Rico

=== Foreign relations of Puerto Rico ===
Foreign relations of Puerto Rico

- Consular Offices in Puerto Rico
- United States-Puerto Rico relations

==== International organization membership ====
The Commonwealth of Puerto Rico is a member of:

- Caribbean Community and Common Market (Caricom) (observer)
- International Criminal Police Organization (Interpol) (subbureau)
- International Olympic Committee (IOC)
- International Trade Union Confederation (ITUC)
- Universal Postal Union (UPU)
- World Confederation of Labour (WCL)
- World Federation of Trade Unions (WFTU)
- World Tourism Organization (UNWTO) (associate)

=== Law and order in Puerto Rico ===
Law of Puerto Rico

- Cannabis in Puerto Rico
- Constitution of Puerto Rico
- Crime in Puerto Rico
- Human rights in Puerto Rico
  - LGBT rights in Puerto Rico
  - Freedom of religion in Puerto Rico
- Law enforcement in Puerto Rico

=== Military of Puerto Rico ===
Military history of Puerto Rico

- Command
  - Commander-in-chief:
- Military of Puerto Rico
- Puerto Rico National Guard
- Puerto Rico Air National Guard
- List of Puerto Rican military personnel

=== Local government in Puerto Rico ===
Local government in Puerto Rico

== History of Puerto Rico ==
History of Puerto Rico

- Military history of Puerto Rico
  - Grito de Lares
  - Intentona de Yauco
  - Puerto Ricans in World War I
  - Puerto Ricans in World War II
  - 65th Infantry Regiment
  - Puerto Ricans in the Vietnam War
- Indigenous people
  - Ortoiroid people
  - Saladoid people
  - Arawak
  - Taíno
  - On November 19, 1493, a Spanish fleet under the command of Christoffa Corombo (Christopher Columbus) lands on a large island inhabited by Taíno people that he names San Juan Bautista (Saint John the Baptist, now Puerto Rico).
  - On August 8, 1508, Spanish conquistador Juan Ponce de León establishes Capárra, the first European settlement on the island of San Juan Bautista.
- Viceroyalty of New Spain, 1519–1821
  - Captaincy General of Puerto Rico, 1580-1898
  - Military history of Puerto Rico
  - Royal Decree of Graces of 1815
  - El Grito de Lares of 1868
  - Moret Law of 1870
  - Intentona de Yauco of 1898
- Spanish–American War, April 23 – August 12, 1898
  - Spanish Empire declares war on the United States, April 23, 1898
  - United States invasion of Puerto Rico, July 25, 1898
  - Treaty of Paris, December 10, 1898
- United States Military government of Porto Rico, December 10, 1898 – May 1, 1900
  - Foraker Act of 1900
  - World War I, June 28, 1914 – November 11, 1918
- Territory of Porto Rico (United States), March 2, 1917 – May 17, 1932
  - Jones–Shafroth Act of March 2, 1917
  - Puerto Ricans in World War I War on April 6, 1917
- Territory of Puerto Rico (United States), May 17, 1932 – July 25, 1952
  - Puerto Ricans in World War II, September 1, 1939 – September 2, 1945
  - Cold War, September 3, 1945 – December 31, 1992
  - Korean War, June 25, 1950 – July 27, 1953
- Puerto Rican Nationalist Party Revolts of the 1950s
  - Ponce massacre
  - Río Piedras massacre
  - Jayuya Uprising
  - Utuado Uprising
  - San Juan Nationalist revolt
- Estado Libre Asociado de Puerto Rico (Commonwealth of Puerto Rico) since July 25, 1952
  - Constitution of Puerto Rico of July 25, 1952
  - Puerto Ricans in the Vietnam War, March 8, 1965 – March 29, 1973
  - Persian Gulf War, August 2, 1990 – February 28, 1991
  - War on terror since September 12, 2001
  - Afghanistan War, October 7, 2001 – December 31, 2016
  - Iraq War, March 20, 2003 – December 18, 2011
  - Political status of Puerto Rico
- History of women in Puerto Rico

== Culture of Puerto Rico ==
Culture of Puerto Rico

- Ethnicity in Puerto Rico
  - African immigration to Puerto Rico
  - Chinese immigration to Puerto Rico
  - Corsican immigration to Puerto Rico
  - French immigration to Puerto Rico
  - German immigration to Puerto Rico
  - Irish immigration to Puerto Rico
  - Jewish immigration to Puerto Rico
  - Spanish immigration to Puerto Rico
  - Cultural diversity in Puerto Rico
- Festivals in Puerto Rico
- Media in Puerto Rico
- National symbols of Puerto Rico
  - Coat of arms of Puerto Rico
  - Flags of Puerto Rico
  - National anthem of Puerto Rico
- People of Puerto Rico
- History of women in Puerto Rico
- Public holidays in Puerto Rico
- Religion in Puerto Rico
  - Buddhism in Puerto Rico
  - Christianity in Puerto Rico
    - Roman Catholicism in Puerto Rico
    - Protestantism in Puerto Rico
  - Hinduism in Puerto Rico
  - Islam in Puerto Rico
  - Judaism in Puerto Rico
- World Heritage Sites in Puerto Rico

=== Art in Puerto Rico ===
- Architecture of Puerto Rico
- Art in Puerto Rico
- Cinema of Puerto Rico
- Literature of Puerto Rico
- Music of Puerto Rico
- Television in Puerto Rico
- Theatre in Puerto Rico

=== Cuisine ===
- Cuisine of Puerto Rico
- Piragua

=== Sports in Puerto Rico ===
Sports in Puerto Rico

- The history of organized sports in Puerto Rico
- Football in Puerto Rico
- Puerto Rico at the Olympics

== Economy and infrastructure of Puerto Rico ==
Economy of Puerto Rico

- Economic rank, by nominal GDP (2007): 95th (ninety-fifth)
- Agriculture in Puerto Rico
- Banking in Puerto Rico
  - Puerto Rico Government Development Bank
- Communications in Puerto Rico
  - Internet in Puerto Rico
- Companies of Puerto Rico
- Currency of Puerto Rico: Dollar
  - ISO 4217: USD
- Energy in Puerto Rico
  - Energy policy of Puerto Rico
  - Oil industry in Puerto Rico
- Mining in Puerto Rico
- Tourism in Puerto Rico
- Transport in Puerto Rico
- Puerto Rico Stock Exchange

== Education in Puerto Rico ==
Education in Puerto Rico

== Infrastructure of Puerto Rico ==
- Health care in Puerto Rico
- Transportation in Puerto Rico
  - Airports in Puerto Rico
  - Rail transport in Puerto Rico
  - Roads in Puerto Rico
- Water supply and sanitation in Puerto Rico

== See also ==
- Topic overview:
  - Puerto Rico
