= Puerto Rico fiscal agent and financing =

Agency overview
- Jurisdiction: executive branch
- Parent agency: Office of the Governor
- Child agencies: AFICA; COFINA; Economic Development Bank; Financing of Housing Authority; Financing of Puerto Rico Infrastructure Authority; Government Development Bank; Municipal Financing Agency; Public-Private Partnerships Authority; Public Financing Corporation

The Puerto Rico fiscal agent and financing (Spanish: Agente Fiscal y Financiamiento de Puerto Rico) are a group of government-owned corporations of Puerto Rico that manage all aspects of financing for the executive branch of the government of Puerto Rico. These report to the Secretariat of Governance and the Chief of Staff, and do not constitute an agency by themselves but are referred as such in official documents, transcripts, expositions, and conversations.

== Agencies ==
- Municipal Financing Agency
- Authority for the Financing of Housing
- Authority for the Financing of Industrial, Touristic, Educative, Medical, and Environmental Control Facilities (AFICA)
- Authority for the Financing of Puerto Rico Infrastructure
- Public-Private Partnerships Authority
- Public Financing Corporation
- Economic Development Bank
- Government Development Bank
- Urgent Interest Fund Corporation (COFINA)
