= Chief of Staff of Puerto Rico =

Head of the Secretariat of Governance in Puerto Rico

- Incumbent; Norma Burgos since August 10, 2026
- Appointer: Governor of Puerto Rico
- Term length: At the governor's pleasure
- Formation: Executive order proclaimed in virtue of Act No. 104 of 1956
- Salary: US$168,000

The Chief of Staff of Puerto Rico (Spanish: Secretario de la Gobernación de Puerto Rico) is the highest-ranking officer in the executive branch of the government of Puerto Rico after the governor and the secretary of state. The Chief of Staff leads the Secretariat of Governance and is charged with managing and overseeing almost all executive agencies while assisting and advising the governor.

The chief of staff is a political appointee for the Governor of Puerto Rico who does not require Senate confirmation, and who serves at the pleasure of the governor. While it is not a legally required role, since the position was officially established in 1986, all governors since Rafael Hernández Colón have appointed a chief of staff.

The Chief of Staff of Puerto Rico serves as the Governor’s principal aide in directing the executive branch of government and is regarded as the Governor’s main policy advisor. The most important responsibility of the position is to ensure compliance with the Governor’s public policy agenda across all agencies.

The office coordinates the work of agency heads to guarantee the effective implementation of governmental priorities and advises the Governor on administrative, legislative, and policy matters. The Chief of Staff also oversees the preparation of executive orders, legislation, and official memoranda. In addition, the position plays a central role in crisis management and emergency response, assists in the planning and coordination of actions during natural disasters and other emergencies, and may represent the Governor in official activities and meetings with federal entities, municipal governments, and private sector organizations, while monitoring the performance of agencies in the execution of infrastructure projects, social programs, and economic initiatives.

== Duties and responsibilities ==
The duties of the chief of staff vary greatly from one administration to another, and in fact, there is no legal requirement that the governor even fill or create the position. Nevertheless, one of the first acts undertaken by a new governor is to issue an executive order appointing a new chief of staff. This order also establishes the chief of staff's duties and responsibilities as the governor sees fit. This proclamation is done by virtue of the executive powers vested upon the governor by Article IV of the Constitution and Law No. 104 of 1956, which include the faculty to appoint officers and to delegate functions.

The duties and responsibilities are both managerial and advisory and typically include the following:

- Manage and supervise the executive departments of the government of Puerto Rico
- Manage the flow of information between the Governor and the executive departments
- Advise the Governor on various issues
- Directing, managing and overseeing all policy development
- Making sure the public policy of the Governor is implemented by all agency heads
- Run the day-to-day government operations
- Advise on any and usually various issues set by the Governor

== Agencies overseen ==
Both the Constitution of Puerto Rico and Puerto Rican law usually ascribe all executive offices to either the Governor or the Office of the Governor. The Governor then issues an executive order proclaiming the delegation of the management and oversight of such executive offices onto the chief of staff. This proclamation is done in virtue of the executive powers vested upon the Governor by Law No. 104 of 1956 which include the faculty to delegate functions.

The agencies overseen by the Chief of Staff include all the executive departments of the government of Puerto Rico and almost all executive offices created either through an executive order or by law.

As the Department of State is headed by the Secretary of State—who holds a higher constitutional rank than the Chief of Staff and frequently serves as Acting Governor—Chiefs of Staff, as a matter of courtesy and deference, generally refrain from exercising the same degree of oversight over that Department as they do with others.

The agencies overseen by the Chief of Staff include the following:

- Department of Agriculture
- Department of Consumer Affairs
- Department of Corrections and Rehabilitation
- Department of Economic Development and Commerce
- Department of Education
- Department of Family Affairs
- Department of Health
- Department of Housing
- Department of Justice
- Department of Labor and Human Resources
- Department of Natural and Environmental Resources
- Department of Public Safety
- Department of Sports and Recreation
- Department of Transportation and Public Works
- Department of Treasury
- Economic Development Bank
- Federal Affairs Administration
- Financing of Housing Authority
- Financing of Industrial, Touristic, Educative, Medical, and Environmental Control Facilities Authority (AFICA)
- Financing of Puerto Rico Infrastructure Authority
- Government Development Bank
- Municipal Financing Agency
- Public Financing Corporation
- Public-Private Partnerships Authority
- Urgent Interest Fund Corporation (COFINA)
- Office of Management and Budget
- Planning Board
- among others

== Chiefs of Staff ==
PPD PNP
#	Portrait	Name	Date took office	Date left office	Political party	Appointed by	Affiliation
1	Sila M. Calderón	Sila M. Calderón	January 2, 1985	December 31, 1989 (1824 days in office)	PPD	Rafael Hernández Colón	Democrat
2		Óscar Rodríguez García	January 1, 1990	December 31, 1992 (1095 days in office)	PPD	Rafael Hernández Colón	Democrat
3		Álvaro C. Cifuentes	January 2, 1993	July 31, 1995 (940 days in office)	PNP	Pedro Rosselló	Democrat
4	Morey	Angel Morey	August 2, 1995	December 31, 2000 (1978 days in office)	PNP	Pedro Rosselló	Democrat
5		César Miranda	January 3, 2001	December 31, 2004 (1458 days in office)	PPD	Sila María Calderón	Democrat
6		Aníbal José Torres	January 3, 2005	June 21, 2006 (534 days in office)	PPD	Aníbal Acevedo Vilá	Democrat
7		Jorge Silva Puras	June 22, 2006	December 31, 2009 (923 days in office)	PPD	Aníbal Acevedo Vilá	Democrat
8		Juan Carlos Blanco Urrutia	January 2, 2009	October 3, 2009 (274 days in office)	PNP	Luis Fortuño	Republican
9		Marcos Rodriguez Ema	December 4, 2009	July 31, 2012 (970 days in office)	PNP	Luis Fortuño	Republican
10	Miguel Romero	Miguel Romero	August 1, 2012	December 31, 2012 (152 days in office)	PNP	Luis Fortuño	Republican
11		Ingrid Vila Biaggi	January 2, 2013	September 19, 2014 (625 days in office)	PPD	Alejandro García Padilla	Democrat
12		Víctor Suárez	September 20, 2014	November 19, 2015 (425 days in office)	PPD	Alejandro García Padilla	Democrat
13		Grace Santana Balado	November 20, 2015	December 31, 2016 (407 days in office)	PPD	Alejandro García Padilla	Democrat
14	WILLIAN_VILLAFAÑE_(cropped)	William Villafañe	January 2, 2017	May 2, 2018 (485 days in office)	PNP	Ricky Rosselló	Republican
15	Luis G. Rivera Marin	Luis Rivera Marín, interim	May 3, 2018	July 31, 2018 (89 days in office)	PNP	Ricky Rosselló	Republican
16		Raúl Maldonado	August 1, 2018	January 31, 2019 (183 days in office)	PNP	Ricky Rosselló	Unknown
17	Ricardo Llerandi	Ricardo Llerandi	February 2, 2019	August 2, 2019 (182 days in office)	PNP	Ricky Rosselló	Unknown
18	Zoe Laboy	Zoé Laboy	August 21, 2019	December 18, 2019 (119 days in office)	PNP	Wanda Vazquez	Democrat
19		Antonio Pabón	December 21, 2019	December 31, 2020 (376 days in office)	PNP	Wanda Vazquez	Unknown
20		Noelia Garcia	January 2, 2021	December 31, 2024 (1459 days in office)	PNP	Pedro Pierluisi	Democrat
21		Francisco Domenech	January 2, 2025	August 7, 2026 (582 days in office)	PNP	Jenniffer González-Colón	Democrat
