= Financial Oversight and Management Board for Puerto Rico =

US government entity

- Junta de Supervisión y Administración Financiera para Puerto Rico

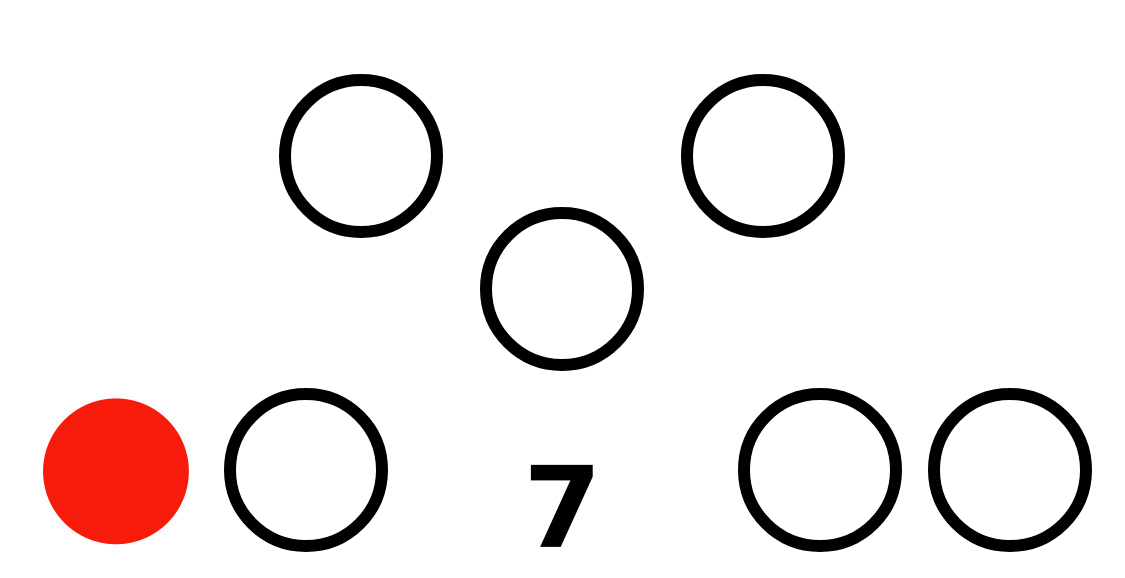
- Current composition of the Financial Oversight and Management Board following the dismissals of August 2025. In blue, Democratic members of the board. In red, Republicans. Empty circles represent current vacancies.

Agency overview
- Formed: June 30, 2016; 10 years ago
- Type: Financial regulatory authorities
- Jurisdiction: Federal government of the United States
- Agency executive: John E. Nixon, Chairman of the FOMBPR
- Parent agency: United States Congress
- Website: oversightboard.pr.gov

Financial Oversight and Management Board for Puerto Rico (FOMBPR) (Spanish: Junta de Supervisión y Administración Financiera para Puerto Rico (JSAF), colloquially known as La Junta) is a government entity whose role to revise and approve the budget and obligations of the government of Puerto Rico was created by federal law PROMESA.

== History ==
=== Creation ===
The PROMESA Act establishes the Oversight Board and creates process for restructuring Puerto Rico's public debt as response to Puerto Rico government-debt crisis. On August 31, 2016, Barack Obama appointed the seven members of the board.

In March 2017, Natalie Jaresko, former Minister of Finance in Ukraine, was appointed as the board's executive director. Her chairmanship was accompanied by multiple protests against the FOMBPR in Puerto Rico, the largest being a protest of 100,000 people in San Juan in the summer of 2019, before announcing her resignation in February 2022 effective on 1 April 2022. In 2019, Christian Sobrino, PROMESA's Representative of the Puerto Rican government, resigned in the wake of the Telegramgate scandal effective immediately on July 13, 2019. Robert Mujica became the Oversight Board's executive director on January 1, 2023.

=== Trump firings ===
On August 4, 2025, President Donald Trump dismissed five members of the board. Those removed were Chairman Arthur J. Gonzalez, Cameron McKenzie, Betty Rosa, Juan Sabater, and Luis Ubiñas. The two remaining members were Andrew Biggs and John Nixon. According to a White House statement, the decision followed concerns over the board’s efficiency and effectiveness. On August 13, 2025, Trump also dismissed Andrew Biggs.

On September 18, 2025, Gonzalez, Rosa, Biggs sued to challenged their dismissal, stating that they were dismissed without cause.

== Composition of the FOMBPR ==
=== Current members ===
Democratic Republican
Name	Began Service	Party
John E. Nixon	December 8, 2020	Republican
Vacant		
Vacant		
Vacant		
Vacant		
Vacant		
Vacant		

=== Former members ===
Name	Began service	Service ended	Party
José Carrión III (Former Chairman)	August 31, 2016	October 5, 2020	Republican
Carlos García	August 31, 2016	August 31, 2020	Republican
José González	August 31, 2016	August 31, 2020	Democratic
Ana Matosantos	August 31, 2016	August 31, 2020	Democratic
Antonio L. Medina	August 31, 2016	August 31, 2020	Democratic
David Skeel	August 31, 2016	August 31, 2024	Republican
Arthur Gonzalez	August 31, 2016	August 1, 2025	Democratic
Justin Peterson	October 7, 2020	August 18, 2023	Republican
Betty Rosa	December 8, 2020	August 1, 2025	Democratic
Juan Sabater	January 18, 2024	August 1, 2025	Democratic
Luis Ubiñas	June 26, 2024	August 1, 2025	Democratic
Cameron McKenzie	September 6, 2024	August 1, 2025	Democratic
Andrew Biggs	August 31, 2016	August 13, 2025	Republican

=== Officers ===
Name	Position
John E. Nixon (By Default)	Chairman
Robert Mujica	Executive Director
Jaime El Koury	Legal Counsel
José R. Pérez-Riera	Revitalization Coordinator
Jenniffer González Colón	Representative of the Government of Puerto Rico (Governor)

== Authority ==
Appointed by the Speaker of the House of Representatives and the President of the United States, La Junta has authority over the commonwealth's budget, with a mandate to maneuver the liquidity crisis that the island's government faces amidst a shrinking economy and a debt crisis. The board has the authority over "the prompt enforcement of any applicable laws of the covered territory prohibiting public sector employees from participating in a strike or lockout" (PROMESA, 559). La Junta also has the power to fast-track approval of infrastructure projects and public-private partnerships. The law also gives total immunity to the board members in the face of any potential lawsuits.

== Opposition ==
Puerto Rican business leaders, scholars, teachers, performing artists, and activists have led protests against La Junta. In July 2019, hundreds of thousands of people rallied in the streets of San Juan to chants for Governor Ricardo Rosselló to "resign and take the 'junta' with you." Many argue that The Financial Oversight and Management Board for Puerto Rico amounts to the return of colonial rule over Puerto Rico. Among them, Dr. Ronald Mendoza-de Jesus wrote, "Many, myself included, feel that the time has come to finally dispel the fantasy of Puerto Rico's sovereignty under US rule and to take up again the question of the economic and ontological implications of striving to become a sovereign nation." Puerto Rican filmmaker Francis Negrón-Muntaner argues in "The Emptying Island," that PROMESA "marks a transition to a new iteration of colonial-capitalism". Negrón-Muntaner notes that the Board is "composed of individuals with deep ties to the banking and investment world—including some involved in producing the debt crisis—and granted them broad powers over Puerto Rico's elected government to assure that creditors will be paid." In 2019, thirteen members of the United States Congress included Alexandria Ocasio-Cortez and Bernie Sanders signed a letter that demanded that the Puerto Rico fiscal oversight board, known as "la junta," disclose its conflicts of interest.

In May 2023, the United States Supreme Court ruled against a Puerto Rican media organization in its quest to obtain documents from the Federal Council to oversee the island's financial restructuring. The judges said that Congress has not been clear enough about lifting the Board of Financial Supervision and Management's sovereign immunity, which would allow Centro de Periodismo Investigativo Inc. to subpoena the board over documents related to the restructuring of the economy of Puerto Rico.

In June 2025, Puerto Rico Senate President Thomas Rivera Schatz introduced a resolution demanding that the United States Congress and the President of the United States dissolve the Puerto Rico Fiscal Oversight Board.

== Net metering controversy ==
In the spring of 2024, FOMB sent two letters to the Governor of Puerto Rico and the legislature threatening to overturn a solar net energy metering law, known as Act 10. Act 10 was unanimously passed by the legislature in 2023, and signed into law by Governor Pierluisi in January 2024, and it extended net energy metering for new home solar and storage customers until 2031. In their letters, FOMB threatened to nullify Act 10, which would undermine Puerto Rican law, slow down Puerto Rico's efforts to install clean energy, and threaten end a rapidly growing rooftop solar and storage industry.

Backlash to FOMB's efforts to undermine the will of the people was swift, and 21 Members of Congress, including Resident Commissioner Jennifer González-Colón, wrote a letter to FOMB demanding that they protect net energy metering. Alexandria Ocasio-Cortez, Bernie Sanders, and Nydia Velázquez all signed the letter. In addition to Members of Congress, fifteen non-governmental organizations including NRDC, GRID Alternatives, Community Foundation of Puerto Rico, Environment America, and the League of Conservation Voters all wrote a letter to President Biden asking that he appoint new commissioners to FOMB's board who would protect rooftop solar and storage for the people of Puerto Rico.

In July 2024, US Energy Secretary Jennifer Granholm traveled to Puerto Rico and stated the following to El Nuevo Dia, "We support net metering... It’s a tool that has allowed for remarkable progress that has not yet been fully materialized, but we are hopeful for its continuity."

== See also ==
- Puerto Rican government-debt crisis
- Territories of the United States
