= Budget of the Government of Puerto Rico =

Proposed by the Governor of Puerto Rico

2012 Budget of the Government of Puerto Rico.

The Budget of the Government of Puerto Rico (Spanish: Presupuesto del Gobierno de Puerto Rico) is the proposal by the Governor of Puerto Rico to the Legislative Assembly which recommends funding levels for the next fiscal year, beginning on July 1 and ending on June 30 of the following year. This proposal is established by Article IV of the Constitution of Puerto Rico and is presented in two forms:

- the General Budget, which includes the budget proposed for all the executive departments of the government of Puerto Rico, and
- the Consolidated Budget, which includes:
  - the budget proposed for the General Budget,
  - the Public Improvements Fund,
  - the Special State Funds,
  - the revenue expected from the expected subsidies to be received from the federal government of the United States,
  - the budget proposed for Puerto Rico's government-owned corporations,
  - the revenue expected from loans expected to be taken in the upcoming fiscal year and the sale of government bonds expected to undergo in the upcoming fiscal year, and
  - other funds.

== Overview ==
For practical reasons the budget is divided into two aspects: a "general budget" which comprises the assignments funded exclusively by the Department of Treasury of Puerto Rico, and the "consolidated budget" which comprises the assignments funded by the general budget, by Puerto Rico's government-owned corporations, by revenue expected from loans, by the sale of government bonds, by subsidies extended by the federal government of the United States, and by other funds.

Both budgets contrast each other drastically, with the consolidated budget being usually thrice the size of the general budget; currently $29B and $9B respectively. Almost one out of every four dollars in the consolidated budget comes from U.S. federal subsidies while government-owned corporations compose more than 31% of the consolidated budget.

The critical aspects come from the sale of bonds, which comprise 7% of the consolidated budget; a ratio that increased annually due to the government's inability to prepare a balanced budget in addition to being incapable of generating enough income to cover all its expenses. In particular, the government-owned corporations add a heavy burden to the overall budget and public debt as not a single one is self-sufficient, all of them carrying extremely inefficient operations. For example, in FY2011 the government-owned corporations reported aggregated losses of more than $1.3B with the Puerto Rico Highways and Transportation Authority (PRHTA) reporting losses of $409M, the Puerto Rico Electric Power Authority (PREPA; the government monopoly that controls all electricity on the island) reporting losses of $272M, while the Puerto Rico Aqueducts and Sewers Authority (PRASA; the government monopoly that controls all water utilities on the island) reported losses of $112M. All these losses were defrayed through the issuance of bonds compounding more than 40% of Puerto Rico's entire public debt today. Holistically, from FY2000–FY2010 Puerto Rico's debt grew at a compound annual growth rate (CAGR) of 9% while GDP remained stagnant.

In terms of protocol, the governor, together with the Puerto Rico Office of Management and Budget (OGP in Spanish), formulates the budget he believes is required to operate all government branches for the ensuing fiscal year. He then submits this formulation as a budget request to the Puerto Rican legislature before July 1, the date established by law as the beginning of Puerto Rico's fiscal year. While the constitution establishes that the request must be submitted "at the beginning of each regular session", the request is typically submitted during the first week of May as the regular sessions of the legislature begin in January and it would be unpractical to submit a request so far ahead. Once submitted the budget is then approved by the legislature, typically with amendments, through a joint resolution and referred back to the governor for his approval. The governor then either approves it or vetoes it. If vetoed the legislature can then either refer it back with amendments for the governor's approval, or approve it without the governor's consent by two-thirds of the bodies of each chamber.

Once approved the Department of Treasury disburses funds to the Office of Management and Budget which in turn disburses the funds to the respective agencies, all while the Puerto Rico Government Development Bank (the government's intergovernmental bank) manages all related banking affairs including those related to the government-owned corporations.

== 2011 budget balance ==
The Puerto Rico government budget balance is the overall result of the budget of the government of Puerto Rico over the course of a fiscal year beginning on July 1 and ending on June 30 of the following year. As of November 2012, the government's balance is experiencing a deficit of about $1.1 billion US$. The government has about $15.1 billion in total assets and $48.8 billion in total liabilities.

2011 balance sheet (in thousands)
Assets
Current assets	$ / 3,848 / ,674
Capital assets	7,768 / ,350
Other assets	3,529 / ,148
Total assets	15,146 / ,172
Liabilities
Current liabilities	$ / 4,795 / ,304
Noncurrent liabilities	44,028 / ,843
Total liabilities	48,824 / ,147
Undesignated, Unreserved Fund Balances
Invested in capital assets, net of related debt	$ / 3,693 / ,531
Restricted	2,335 / ,799
Unrestricted	(39,707 / ,305)
Total Net Assets (deficit)	$ / (33,677 / ,975)

== Consolidated fund ==
The Puerto Rico Consolidated Fund (Spanish: Fondo Consolidado de Puerto Rico) is the sum of all revenues collected by the government of Puerto Rico; in specific, it includes:

- the revenues collected from the Puerto Rico General Fund,
- the Public Improvements Fund,
- the Special State Funds,
- the revenues collected as subsidies from the federal government of the United States,
- the revenues collected from Puerto Rico's government-owned corporations,
- the revenues collected from loans undertaken during the fiscal year and the revenues collected from the sale of government bonds undergone during the fiscal year, and
- other funds.

The Fund was about $31.4 billion USD for the 2010 fiscal year, constituting a deficit. Although the Department of Treasury doesn't provide contemporary figures, the Fund is expected to decrease by 5.7% or about ▼$1.8 billion for the 2011 fiscal year, followed by an increase of 4% or about ▲$1.2 billion for the 2011 year, and then decrease once again by 5.3% or about ▼$1.6 billion for the 2013 fiscal year.

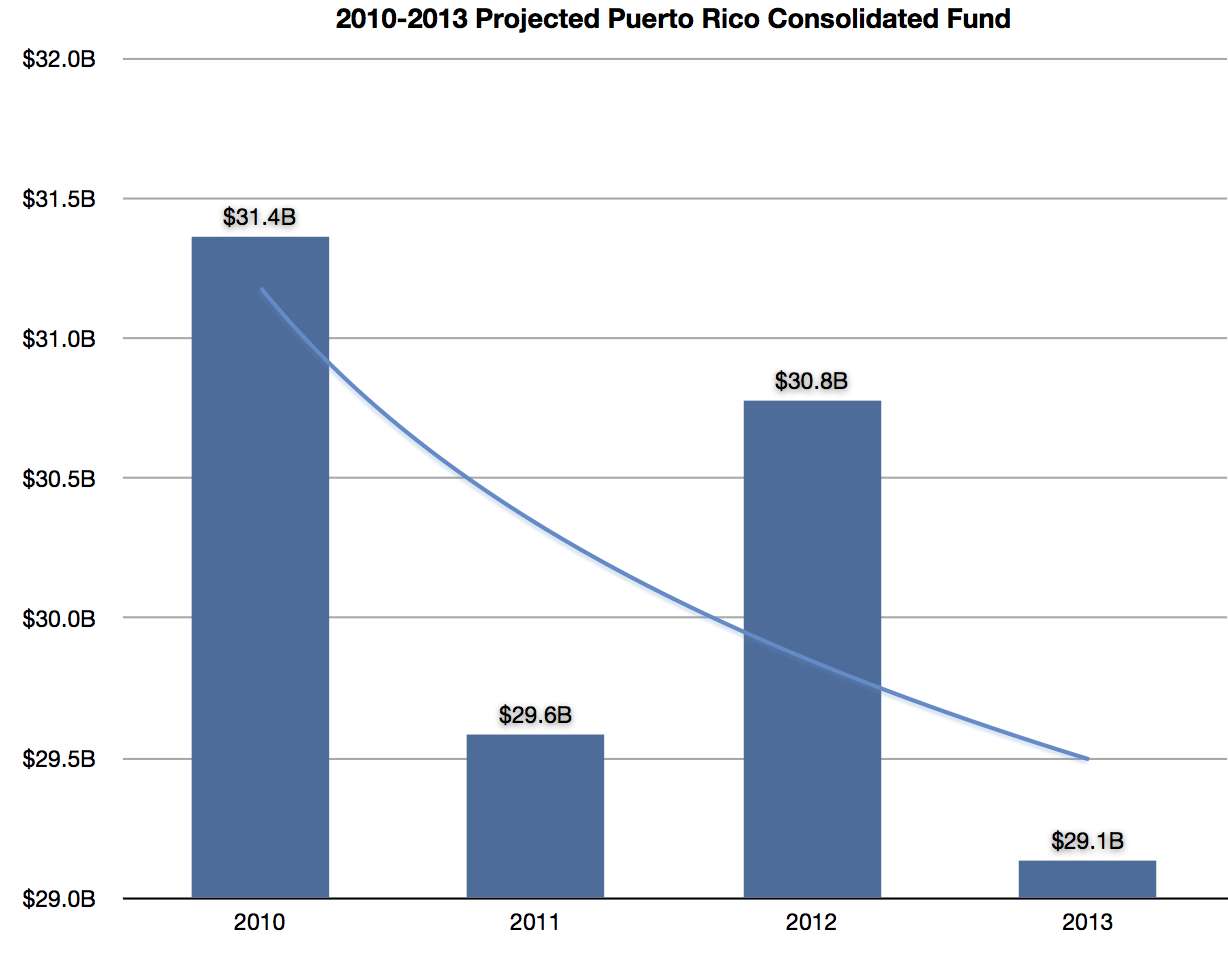
Consolidated Fund for the 2010–2013 fiscal periods.

== General fund ==
The Puerto Rico General Fund (Spanish: Fondo General de Puerto Rico) is the primary operating fund of the government of Puerto Rico and comprises the portion of the Puerto Rico Consolidated Fund collected by the Department of Treasury of Puerto Rico through all the license fees and taxes collected by the executive departments of the government of Puerto Rico. The Fund was about $10.1 billion USD for the 2010 fiscal year, constituting a deficit. Although the Department of Treasury doesn't provide contemporary figures, the Fund is expected to decrease by 8.9% or about ▼$1.0 billion for the 2011 fiscal year, followed by an increase of 1.2% or about ▲$109.7 million for the 2011 year, and then decrease once again by 1.9% or about ▼$177.3 million for the 2013 fiscal year.

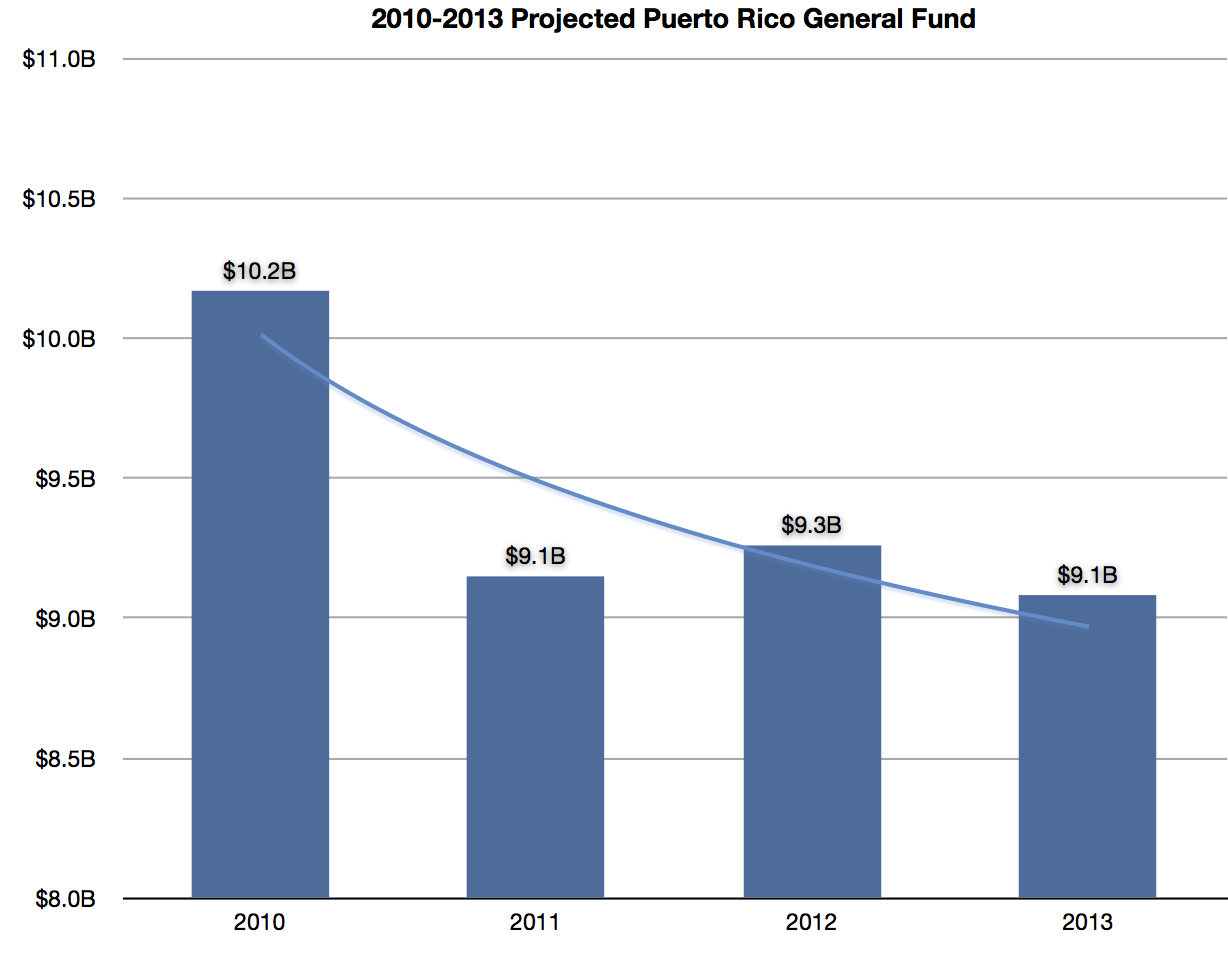
General Fund for the 2010–2013 fiscal periods.

== See also ==
- Puerto Rico Chapter 9 Uniformity Act of 2015
