= COFIM =

Government-owned corporation of Puerto Rico

Municipal Finance Corporation
- Headquarters: Guaynabo, Puerto Rico
- Established: February 1, 2014; 11 years ago
- Currency: USD

The Municipal Finance Corporation —Spanish: Corporación de Financiamiento Municipal (COFIM)— is a government-owned corporation of Puerto Rico that issues government bonds and uses other financing mechanisms to pay or refinance, directly or indirectly, in whole or in part, the debts of the municipalities of Puerto Rico payable or backed by the Puerto Rican municipal sales and use tax. The corporation is an affiliate of the Government Development Bank and is identical to COFINA, save that its funds come from the municipal aspect of the sales tax rather than from the state one.

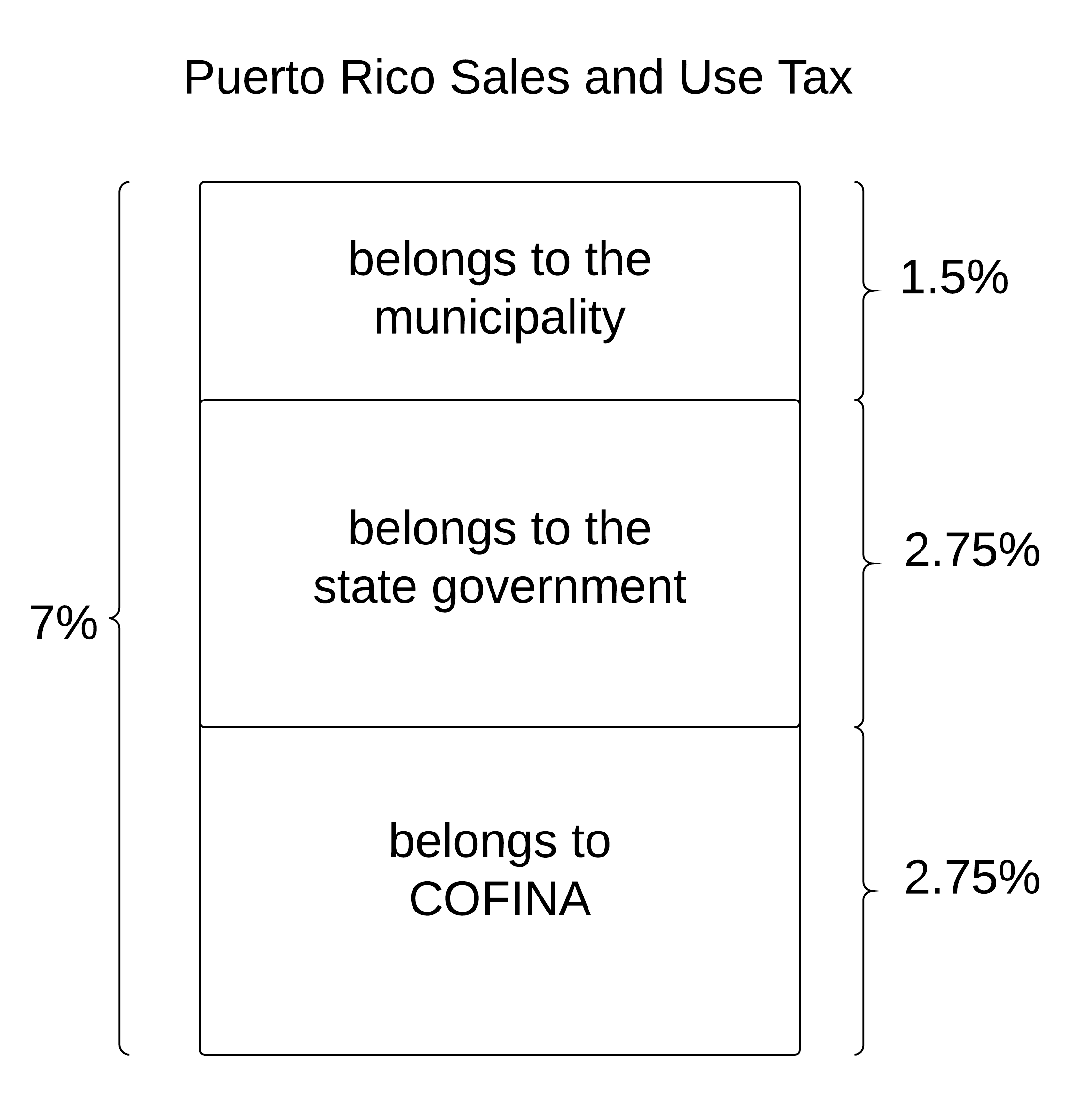
Components of the Puerto Rico Sales and Use Tax, showing the municipal aspect that belongs to COFIM and the state aspect that belongs to COFINA.
