= Grace Santana Balado =

Puerto Rican politician

Chief of Staff of Puerto Rico
- In office December 9, 2015 – January 1, 2017
- Governor: Alejandro García Padilla
- Preceded by: Víctor Suárez Meléndez
- Succeeded by: William Villafañe

Executive Director, Authority for the Financing of the Infrastructure of Puerto Rico
- Governor: Alejandro García Padilla

Executive Director, Puerto Rico Public-Private Partnerships Authority
- Governor: Alejandro García Padilla

Personal details
- Party: Popular Democratic Party (PPD)
- Other political affiliations: Democratic

Grace Santana Balado (Note: In this Spanish name, the first or paternal surname is Santana and the second or maternal family name is Balado.) is an attorney and former Puerto Rico Chief of Staff. Before her appointment, Santana Balado served as executive director of the Authority for the Financing of the Infrastructure of Puerto Rico (AFI) and as executive director of the Puerto Rico Public-Private Partnerships Authority (PPPA).
