= José Berrocal =

Puerto Rican businessman (1957–2000)

President of the Puerto Rico Government Development Bank
- In office 1991–1992
- Governor: Rafael Hernández Colón
- Preceded by: Ramón Cantero Frau
- Succeeded by: Marcos Rodríguez Ema

Personal details
- Born: March 16, 1957 San Juan, Puerto Rico
- Died: October 25, 2000 (aged 43) Detroit, Michigan
- Party: Popular Democratic Party
- Education: Princeton School of Public and International Affairs; University of Oxford; Yale Law School

José M. Berrocal (March 16, 1957 – October 25, 2000) was the youngest president of Puerto Rico Government Development Bank (1991–1992).

== Early years ==
Berrocal was born in 1957 in Puerto Rico. He graduated in 1975 from the Academia del Perpetuo Socorro in Miramar, PR, where he distinguished himself as president of the student council and the Model United Nations Club of PR. An accomplished debater, he championed Perpetuo's Model UN team to first place at the Washington, DC nationals. In 1979, Berrocal graduated Phi Beta Kappa with a Bachelor's degree from Princeton School of Public and International Affairs. He followed this with studies as a Marshall Scholar at Oxford University, and then the study of law at Yale University, where he was an editor at the Yale Law Journal.

== Public service ==
After serving for several years as Legal Counselor to Puerto Rico Governor Rafael Hernández Colón, Berrocal was chosen to serve as president of the Puerto Rico Government Development Bank, the fiscal agent of the Government of Puerto Rico. At the time of his selection, he became the youngest president in the history of the bank.

During his years in public service, Berrocal was also the Governor's designee in the years-long negotiations led by the United States Senate Energy Committee Chairman J. Bennett Johnston, D-La, on Puerto Rico's political status, representing the status quo. He also mentored numerous young professionals working in government, some of whom were humorously called "berrocalitos" (or mini-Berrocal's) in his honor.

In 1991, it was rumored that Governor Hernández Colón intended to appoint Berrocal as an Associate Justice of the Supreme Court of Puerto Rico, according to a recent history of the Supreme Court (La justicia en sus manos-2007).

== Professional life ==
Subsequent to his stint in government, Berrocal became managing director of Wolfensohn (later acquired by Bankers Trust, then Deutsche Bank, where he worked closely with Federal Reserve Bank chairman Paul Volcker. Prominent businesses in and out of Puerto Rico sought him out as a consultant.

== Final illness ==
Berrocal's close Princeton classmate, Bill Ford, found out that he was seriously ill with a rare disease, thymic cancer. After visiting him in Puerto Rico, Ford sent a plane to fly his friend to the Henry Ford Hospital in Michigan, where a new chemotherapy treatment was applied, to no avail. On October 25, 2000, Berrocal died with his family and Bill Ford at his bedside.

== Memorials ==
On December 7, 2001, Bill Ford and the Ford Motor Company announced the creation of the José M. Berrocal Scholarship for Environmental Studies — $10,000 scholarships to assist graduate students studying environmental disciplines in Puerto Rico.

On May 13, 2002, the Government Development Bank announced the creation of the José M. Berrocal Institute for the Study of Public Finances and the Economy, which offers "training on the theory and practice of public finances and economic development to university students and new government employees." Since 2002, the GDB has sponsored the annual José Berrocal Finance & Economy Institute Internships aimed at providing college level students in the areas of Business Administration, Finance, Economy and Public Administrations — the areas in which Berrocal personally excelled — with a two-month internship experience.
