= List of government-owned corporations of Puerto Rico =

The government-owned corporations of Puerto Rico —or public corporations (Spanish: corporaciones públicas)— are a set of corporate entities owned entirely or in large part by the executive branch of the government of Puerto Rico or by its municipalities. The corporations engage in commercial activities, with their revenues ultimately being allocated towards the government's treasury —the Puerto Rico Consolidated Fund— or towards the corresponding municipal treasury.

Some of the corporations have been criticized since their creation, because they are not profitable and depend on the issue of bonds or public debt to operate, or because they constitute a government monopoly or control a unique asset (such as a port, toll, or land). As of 2015, the public corporations contributed to more than half of the public debt of Puerto Rico —a factor that contributed significantly to the Puerto Rican government-debt crisis— with COFINA, PRASA, PRHTA, and PREPA being the largest holders.

== Executive branch ownership ==
As of November 2012, the executive branch of the government of Puerto Rico owned 52 corporations, with an outstanding debt of US$48.7B.

Executive branch-owned corporations
Name in English	English abbreviation	Spanish name	Spanish abbreviation	Industry
Automobile Accident Compensation Administration	PRAACA	Administración de Compensaciones por Accidentes de Automóviles	ACAA	Insurance
Agricultural Insurance Corporation	PRAIC	Corporación de Seguros Agrícolas	CSA	Agriculture
Aqueducts and Sewers Authority	PRASA	Autoridad de Acueductos y Alcantarillados	AAA	Public utility
Authority for the Financing of Industrial, Touristic, Educative, Medical, and Environmental Control Facilities	AFITEMECF	Autoridad para el Financiamiento de Facilidades Industriales, Turísticas, Educativas, Médicas y de Control Ambiental	AFICA	Banking
Authority for the Financing of Housing	PRAFH	Autoridad para el Financiamiento de la Vivienda	AFV	Banking
Authority for the Financing of the Infrastructure of Puerto Rico	AFI	Autoridad para el Financiamiento de la Infraestructura de Puerto Rico	AFI	Banking
Caño Martín Peña ENLACE Project Corporation	ENLACE	Corporación del Proyecto ENLACE del Caño Martín Peña	ENLACE	Real estate
Cardiovascular Center of Puerto Rico and the Caribbean Corporation	CCPRCC	Corporación del Centro Cardiovascular de Puerto Rico y el Caribe	CCCPRC	Healthcare
Commission on Traffic Safety	PRCTS	Comisión para la Seguridad en el Tránsito	CST	Insurance
Comprehensive Cancer Center	PRCCC	Centro Comprensivo de Cáncer	CCCPR	Healthcare
Conservatory of Music Corporation	PRCMC	Corporación del Conservatorio de Música	CCM	Education
Convention Center District Authority	PRCCDA	Autoridad del Distrito del Centro de Convenciones	ADCCPR	Travel and leisure
Corporation for the Development of Arts, Sciences, and Cinematographic Industry	PRFILM	Corporación para el Desarrollo de las Artes, Ciencias e Industria Cinematográfica	PRFILM	Entertainment
Corporation of Industries for the Blind, Mentally Retarded People, and Other Handicapped People	CIRIO	Corporación de Industrias de Ciegos, Personas Mentalmente Retardadas y Otras Personas Incapacitadas	CIRIO	Industrial development
Credit Unions Supervision and Insurance Corporation	PRCUSIC	Corporación para la Supervisión y Seguros de Cooperativas de Puerto Rico	COSSEC	Insurance
Economic Development Bank	EDB	Banco de Desarrollo Económico	BDE	Banking
Electric Power Authority	PREPA	Autoridad de Energía Electrica	AEE	Public utility
Government Development Bank	GDB	Banco Gubernamental de Fomento	BGF	Banking
Health Insurance Administration	PRHIA	Administración de Seguros de Salud	ASES	Healthcare
Highways and Transportation Authority	PRHTA	Autoridad de Carreteras y Transportación	ACT	Transportation
Industrial Development Company	PRIDCO	Compañía de Fomento Industrial	FOMENTO	Industrial development
Integral Development for the Cantera Peninsula Company	PRIDCPC	Compañía para el Desarrollo Integral de la Península de Cantera	CDIPC	Industrial development
Institute of Puerto Rican Culture	IPRC	Instituto de Cultura Puertorriqueña	ICP	Entertainment
Lands Administration	PRLA	Administración de Terrenos	AT	Real estate
Lands Authority	PRLA	Autoridad de Tierras	ATPR	Agriculture
Maritime Transport Authority	PRMTA	Autoridad de Transporte Marítimo	ATM	Transportation
Medical Services Administration	PRMSA	Administración de Servicios Médicos de Puerto Rico	ASEM	Healthcare
Metropolitan Bus Authority	MBA	Autoridad Metropolitana de Autobuses	AMA	Transportation
Municipal Financing Agency	MFA	Agencia de Financiamiento Municipal	AFM	Banking
Municipal Financing Corporation	MFC	Corporación de Financiamiento Municipal	COFIM	Banking
Musical Arts Corporation	PRMAC	Corporación para las Artes Musicales	CAM	Entertainment
Musical Scenic Arts Corporation	PRMSAC	Corporación de las Artes Escénico-Musicales	CASM	Entertainment
National Guard Institutional Trust	PRNGIT	Fideicomiso Institucional de la Guardia Nacional de Puerto Rico	FIGNA	Banking
National Parks Company	PRNPC	Compañía de Parques Nacionales	CPNPR	Real estate
Performing Arts Center Corporation	PRPACC	Corporación del Centro de Bellas Artes	CBA	Entertainment
Ports Authority	PRPA	Autoridad de los Puertos	APPR	Transportation
Public Broadcasting Corporation	PRPBC	Corporación de Puerto Rico para la Difusión Pública	WIPR	Entertainment
Public Buildings Authority	PBA	Autoridad de Edificios Públicos	AEP	Real estate
Sales Tax Financing Corporation	COFINA	Corporación del Fondo de Interés Apremiante	COFINA	Banking
School of Visual Arts and Design of Puerto Rico	SVAD	Escuela de Artes Plásticas y Diseño de Puerto Rico	EAPD	Education
Solid Waste Authority	SWA	Autoridad de Desperdicios Sólidos	ADS	Public utility
State Insurance Fund Corporation	PRSIFC	Corporación del Fondo del Seguro del Estado	CFSE	Insurance
Symphony Orchestra Corporation	PRSO	Corporación de la Orquesta Sinfónica	COSPR	Entertainment
Trade and Export Company	PRTEC	Compañía de Comercio y Exportación	CCE	Industrial development
Tourism Company	PRTC	Compañía de Turismo de Puerto Rico, or Turismo	CTPR	Travel and leisure
Training and Work Enterprises Corporation	PRTWEC	Corporación de Empresas de Adiestramiento y Trabajo	CEAT	Education
University of Puerto Rico	UPR	Universidad de Puerto Rico	UPR	Education

== Municipality ownership ==
Municipality-owned corporations
Name in English	English abbreviation	Spanish name	Spanish abbreviation	Industry
Ponce Port Authority	PPA	Autoridad del Puerto de Ponce	APP	Transportation

== See also ==
- State-owned enterprises of the United States
