= Jorge Silva Puras =

Puerto Rican government official, academic and businessman

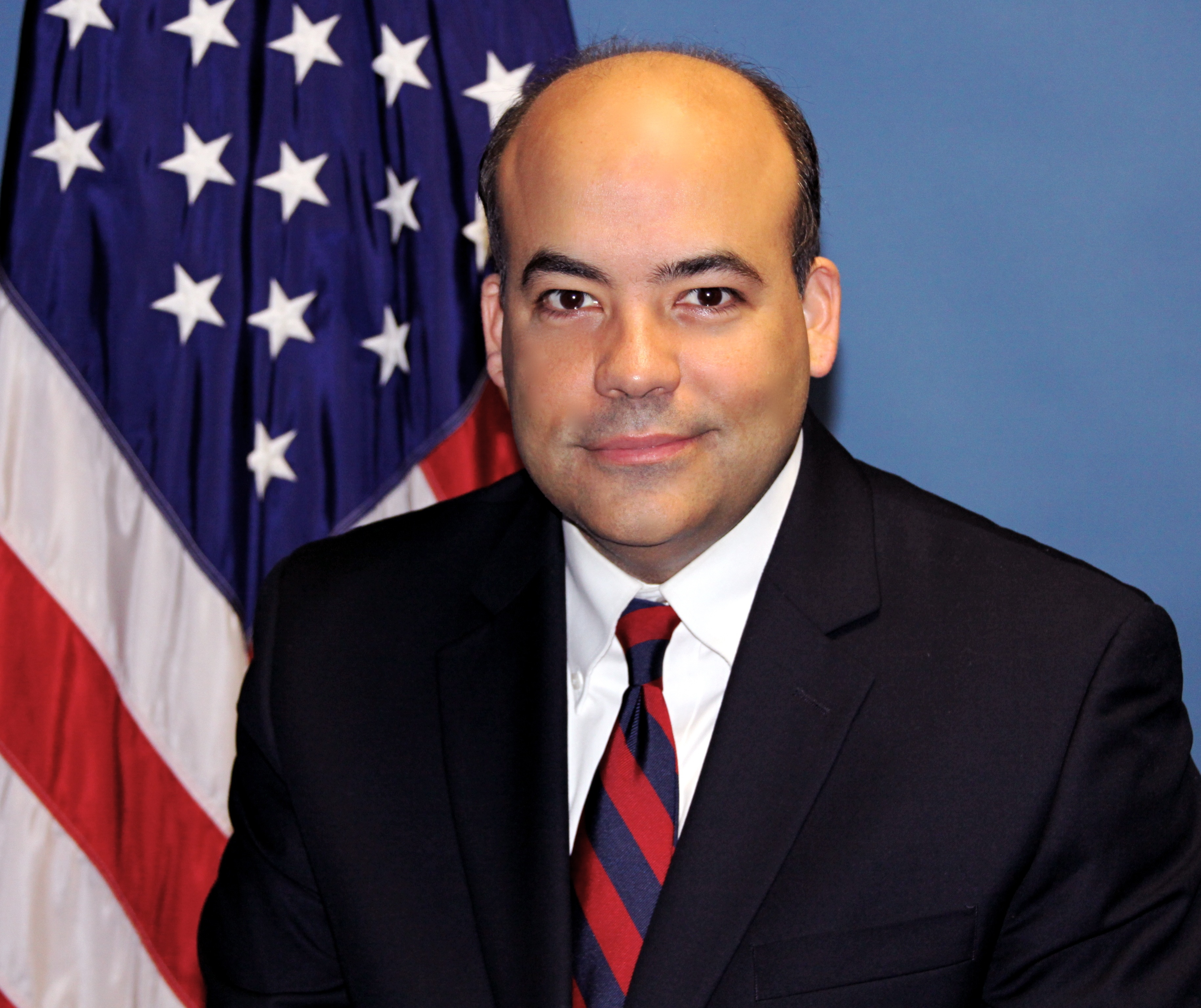

Chief of Staff of Puerto Rico
- In office 2006–2008
- Governor: Aníbal Acevedo Vilá

Secretary of Economic Development and Commerce of Puerto Rico
- In office 2005–2006
- Governor: Aníbal Acevedo Vilá

Personal details
- Died: August 23, 1966 (age 60) San Juan, Puerto Rico
- Party: Popular Democratic
- Education: Yale University (BA); University of Puerto Rico School of Law (JD); University of Texas at Austin (MBA)
- Profession: Attorney

Jorge Silva Puras (born August 23, 1966, in San Juan, Puerto Rico) is a Puerto Rican academic, public servant and government official.

== Early life and education ==
Silva Puras is a 1988 graduate of Yale University where he majored in political science and economics. He received a Juris Doctor with Honors from the University of Puerto Rico in 1991, and an MBA in International Management from the University of Texas at Austin and the Copenhagen Business School in 1996.

== Career ==
He worked at The Procter & Gamble Company, Citigroup, and a San Juan law firm.

=== Puerto Rico government ===
Silva Puras served in several senior government positions at the Commonwealth of Puerto Rico, including Chief of Staff to former Governor of Puerto Rico Aníbal Acevedo Vilá. from June 2006 until December 2008. Previous to his appointment as Chief of Staff, he served as Secretary of the Puerto Rico Department of Economic Development and Commerce, and as Executive Director of the Puerto Rico Industrial Development Company (PRIDCO).

As Secretary of Economic Development, he served as Chairman of the Puerto Rico Tourism Company, the Roosevelt Roads Redevelopment Authority, and the Puerto Rico Land Administration. He also served 4 years as a member of the Board of Directors of the Government Development Bank for Puerto Rico. He served as member of the Board of Directors of Somos El Futuro, a New York non-profit serving the Hispanic population.

As part of his responsibilities as Puerto Rico's Chief of Staff, he led the efforts that resulted in the Governor's Economic Development Plan (EDP), announced in the Fall of 2006, which focused on 6 economic development strategies, including infrastructure investments via public private partnerships (PPPs).

=== U.S. federal government ===
He was the Regional Administrator at the United States Small Business Administration for Region II which includes New York, New Jersey, Puerto Rico and the United States Virgin Islands.

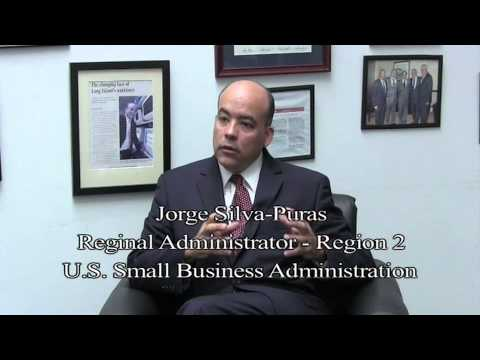

He was appointed to that position by President Barack Obama, and served the Administration from May 2010 until January 2013, when he joined the Hostos faculty. As SBA Regional Administrator, Mr. Silva Puras publicly advocated in favor of small businesses in multiple public forums, such as SAP's SME Summit in New York City, and the New York Senate Unidad Latina conference.

In November 2020, Silva Puras was named a member of the Joe Biden presidential transition Agency Review Team to support transition efforts related to the Small Business Administration.

=== Academia ===
He was provost at Universidad del Sagrado Corazón in San Juan, Puerto Rico. In the US, Silva Puras taught business and entrepreneurship at Hostos Community College in the City University of New York. He was also named a University Associate at NYU in 2020. In 2021, he was named interim dean of the CUNY School of Professional Studies. and as of August 2023 has served as Interim Provost and Senior Vice President for Academic Affairs and Student Success at Lehman College.
