= Puerto Rico State Insurance Fund Corporation =

Government-owned corporation of Puerto Rico that provides workers' compensation

The Puerto Rico State Insurance Fund Corporation —Spanish: Corporación del Fondo del Seguro del Estado (CFSE)—is a government-owned corporation of Puerto Rico that provides workers' compensation in Puerto Rico. The Corporation is headed by a board of directors appointed by the Governor of Puerto Rico and subject to the advice and consent of the Senate of Puerto Rico.

The State Insurance Fund was created by Act Number 45 adopted on April 18, 1935, known as the Law of Compensation System for Occupational Accidents. Its purpose is to guarantee the constitutional right of all workers to be protected from health risks in the workplace. Through Act Number 83 of October 29, 1992, which amended Act Number 45, a board of directors was established and is appointed by the Governor of Puerto Rico.
