= Puerto Rico Government Development Bank =

State bank

Government Development Bank for Puerto Rico
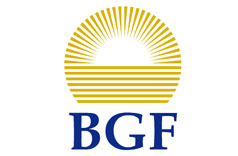
- Headquarters: San Juan, Puerto Rico
- Established: September 23, 1948; 77 years ago
- Currency: USD
- Preceded by: Development Bank
- Website: www.gdb-pur.com

The Government Development Bank for Puerto Rico (GDB) —Spanish: Banco Gubernamental de Fomento para Puerto Rico (BGF)— was the government bond issuer, intragovernmental bank, fiscal agent, and financial advisor of the government of Puerto Rico. The bank, along with its subsidiaries and affiliates, serves as the principal entity through which Puerto Rico channels its issuance of bonds. As an overview, the different executive agencies of the government of Puerto Rico and its government-owned corporations either issue bonds with the bank as a proxy, or owe debt to the bank itself (as the bank is a government-owned corporation as well).

Entity	Common name	Type	Responsibility
Authority for the Financing of the Infrastructure of Puerto Rico	AFI	affiliate	infrastructure
Children's Trust Frund	CTF	affiliate	childhood improvements
Industrial, Tourist, Educational, Medical, and Environmental Control Facilities Authority	AFICA	affiliate	multiple sectors
Housing Finance Authority	PRHFA	subsidiary	housing subsidies and incentives
José M. Berrocal Institute for Economics and Finance	Berrocal Institute	subsidiary	internships
Municipal Financing Agency	MFA	affiliate	municipalities
Municipal Financing Corporation	COFIM	affiliate	municipal tax
Public Financing Corporation	PFC	subsidiary	general obligation bonds (executive agencies/central government)
Public-Private Partnerships Authority	PPPA	affiliate	public-private partnerships
Sales Tax Financing Corporation	COFINA	affiliate	sales tax (IVU/SUT)
Tourism Development Fund	TDF	affiliate	tourism and hotel industry

== History ==
The Bank was founded under the initiative of Governor Rexford Guy Tugwell, who signed Law 253 of May 13, 1942, creating the institution in charge of economic development for the Government of Puerto Rico. A subsequent law in 1945 expanded its responsibilities to include serving as the fiscal agent for, and financial advisor of, the government of Puerto Rico. The centralized government structure established by Tugwell required a fiscal agent, differing from the decentralized model followed by most U.S. states, where individual agencies and political subdivisions manage their own bond issuance.

During its formative years, the GDB contributed to the financial structuring of the Puerto Rico Water Resources Authority, a publicly owned electric company that initially generated power through hydroelectric systems. During its first decade, GDB financed infrastructure development, particularly the development of low-cost housing.

Between 1951 and 1965, the GDB issued over $1 billion in bonds to finance the islands' infrastructure, contributing to Puerto Rico's economic growth. The GDB provided financial support for Puerto Rico's first condominium and several early shopping centers built in 1956, during a period when private banks were hesitant to invest in these projects.

During former Gov. Pedro Rosselló's administration, and under Marcos Rodríguez Ema's presidency, the GDB established and financed the Puerto Rico Museum of Art. The museum is considered one of the most prominent cultural institutions in Puerto Rico, alongside the Ponce Museum of Art founded by Luis A. Ferré.

The GDB is in the process of winding down its operations in an orderly fashion under Title VI of the Puerto Rico Oversight, Management, and Economic Stability Act, Publ. Law 114-187 of June 30, 2016 (PROMESA).

== Presidents ==
- 1942–1953: Rafael Buscaglia
- 1953–1957: Guillermo Rodríguez Benítez
- 1958–1964: Rafael Picó
- 1965–1969: Juan Labadie
- 1970–1973: Roger Wall
- 1973–1975: Juan Albors
- 1975–1975: Guillermo Rodríguez Benítez
- 1975–1976: Alfredo Salazar, Jr.
- 1977–1978: Mariano Mier
- 1978–1985: Julio Pietrantoni Blasini
- 1985–1986: José Ramón Oyola
- 1986–1989: José Ramón González
- 1988–1991: Ramón Cantero Frau
- 1991–1992: José Berrocal
- 1993–1998: Marcos Rodríguez Ema
- 1998–2000: Lourdes Rovira
- 2001–2002: Juan Agosto Alicea
- 2002–2003: Hector Méndez
- 2003–2004: Antonio Faría Soto
- 2005–2005: William Lockwood Benet
- 2005–2007: Alfredo Salazar, Jr.
- 2007–2008: Jorge Irizarry Herrans
- 2009–2011: Carlos M. García
- 2011–2012: Juan Carlos Batlle
- 2013–2013: Javier Ferrer
- 2013–2014: José Pagán Beauchamp (interim)
- 2014–2016: Melba Acosta Febo
- 2016–2016: Alberto Bacó Bagué
- 2017–2019: Christian Sobrino

== See also ==
- List of bonds issued by Puerto Rico
- List of national development banks
