= Carlos M. García =

Puerto Rican banker

President of the Puerto Rico Government Development Bank
- In office 2009–2011
- Governor: Luis Fortuño
- Preceded by: Jorge Irizarry Herrans
- Succeeded by: Juan C. Batlle

Personal details
- Born: June 25, 1971 (age 54) Mayagüez, Puerto Rico
- Party: New Progressive
- Education: University of Pennsylvania (BS); Wharton School (BA)

Carlos M. García, (born on June 25, 1971, in Mayagüez, Puerto Rico), is a Puerto Rican banker, public servant, and private equity investor who served as president of the Puerto Rico Government Development Bank (GDB) from 2009 to 2011 during the administration of Governor Luis Fortuño.

Appointed as president, CEO, and chairman of the Board of GDB on November 13, 2008, by Governor-elect Fortuño, García assumed responsibilities prior to officially joining the payroll. Both traveled to Wall Street during the transition period to negotiate with credit-rating agencies and prevent the reclassification of the island's bonds to junk-bond status before the new administration could legislate new fiscal policies.

The 2009 legislation addressing the $3.306 billion operational and structural deficit faced by the new administration established the Fiscal Reconstruction and Stabilization Board (JREF) with Governor Fortuño appointing García as chairman. This board was responsible for designing and implementing the fiscal recovery policies. Over 22 months, government expenditures were reduced by 20%, and Wall Street credit-rating agencies restored the island’s ratings to their highest levels in 35 years, utilizing a newly enacted Public-Private Partnership Act, and the 2006 COFINA securitization mechanism to stabilize Puerto Rico's finances.

As head of the Governor's economic team, García coordinated the simultaneous disbursement of over $6.5 billion in American Recovery and Reinvestment Act of 2009 funds. He also lobbied for and implemented the federal health reform program, which injected hundreds of millions of dollars into Puerto Rico's health industry, and facilitated the rescue of Puerto Rico's banking system, including three Federal Deposit Insurance Corporation-assisted transactions that encompassed 70% of Puerto Rico's banking market.

On 2016, he was appointed by President Barack Obama to oversee the Financial Oversight and Management Board for Puerto Rico as chairman.

During his tenure in the public sector, García served as chairman of the Board of the newly established Puerto Rico Public-Private Partnerships Authority, initially tasked with five major public-private initiatives, three of which infused over $3 billion in Puerto Rico's economy.

Before his public service, Carlos García served as president and COO of Banco Santander Puerto Rico, one of the leading financial institutions in Puerto Rico, and served on the Board of Directors of Santander Bancorp (NYSE: SBP) from 2001 to 2008. Prior to 2001, he held the positions of President, CEO, and Vice Chairman of the Board of Santander Securities Corporation, Puerto Rico's second-largest wealth and asset management firm. Before joining the Santander corporate family, he served as Vice President of Popular Securities, a subsidiary of Popular, Inc., and as an analyst for Credit Suisse First Boston in San Juan, Puerto Rico and New York, New York.

Carlos is currently the Managing Partner of BayBoston Capital, a private equity firm focused on financial institutions.

Married with three children, García is an avid marathoner.

== Education ==
García graduated from the University of Pennsylvania through a dual degree program, earning a Bachelor of Science in Economics, with a major in management from the Wharton School and a Bachelor of Arts and Sciences degree in Comparative Literature. For his honors thesis, he focused on Federico García Lorca's "Sonetos del Amor Oscuro," published posthumously the Spanish writer's death.

== Honors and recognitions ==
Named "Public Sector Person of the Year" by Caribbean Business weekly business newspaper in 2009.

All-Ivy league Academic Honors, Tennis, University of Pennsylvania (1993).

UPenn's Men's Varsity Division, Tennis Team Captain and Julius Axelrod Sportsmanship Award.
