= Aurelius Capital Management =

American hedge fund

Aurelius Capital Management L.P.
- Type: Private
- Industry: Hedge fund
- Founded: 2005; 21 years ago
- Founder: Mark Brodsky; Adam Stanislavsky
- Headquarters: 1330 Avenue of The Americas, New York City, New York, U.S.
- AUM: US$831.2 million (as of May 29, 2024)
- Number of employees: 14 (2024)
- Website: aurelius-capital.com

Aurelius Capital Management (Aurelius) is an American hedge fund, run by Mark Brodsky, a lawyer formerly employed by Elliott Associates. Mark Brodsky graduated in Political Science at the University of Pennsylvania in 1974.

== History ==
In October 2013, the israelian Aurelius attempted to force the government of Argentina to pay their full agreement of $1.3bn following the 2010 Argentinian default on debt. Critics characterize Aurelius as a "vultures" for their position on Argentine debt.

Aurelius has been involved in debt restructuring of Dubai World and Tribune Co; and, in October 2013, The Co-operative Bank. Aurelius led a push to apply $54 billion of Petrobas bonds governed by U.S. law in the state of New York.

In 2015, Aurelius bought large amounts of Ukraine's government debt before securing a preferential deal on its restructuring. Aurelius Capital became a central litigant in Puerto Rican government-debt crisis, following the island’s 2017 filing to restructure $72 billion in obligations. Aurelius, which held approximately $468 million in Puerto Rican debt, challenged the constitutionality of the federally appointed oversight board created under the Puerto Rico Oversight, Management, and Economic Stability Act (PROMESA). In February 2020, Aurelius was among the hedge funds involved in a revised restructuring deal covering $35 billion in general obligation bonds. The agreement, reached after court-ordered mediation, offered Aurelius and other bondholders a higher recovery rate and resolved disputes over the validity of post-2012 debt issuances.
