= Autopistas de Puerto Rico =

Spanish public–private partnership, privately held company

- Company type: Societas Europaea
- Industry: Transportation
- Genre: Toll bridge
- Founded: 1993; 33 years ago
- Headquarters: San Juan, Puerto Rico
- Area served: San Juan–Caguas–Guaynabo metropolitan area
- Services: operates the Teodoro Moscoso Bridge
- Parent: Abertis
- Website: autopistasdepuertorico.com

Autopistas de Puerto Rico S.E. (English: Puerto Rico Expressways) is a European public–private partnership, privately held company that operates the Teodoro Moscoso Bridge on behalf of the Puerto Rico Highways and Transportation Authority. The company is wholly owned by Abertis.

== History ==
Autopistas de Puerto Rico S.E. was founded by Dragados y Construcciones S.A. of Spain with 74.25% stake, Supra and Company S.E. with 20% share, Rexach Construction Company with 4.75% interest and Autopistas Corporation (English: Expressways Corporation) with 1% interest. In 1998 Valor 2000 S.A. of Spain bought Dragados' share, who in turn sold their shares to Aurea Concesiones de Infraestructura de España in 2001. In 2003, Abertis bought Aurea out, and then, in 2010, acquired the remaining 24.75% shares owned by the other two founding members. The remaining 1% is owned by Autopistas Corporation, a shell company based in Puerto Rico which is also owned by Abertis.

== Timeline ==
- 1993: Autopistas de Puerto Rico S.E. is founded.
- 1994: the Teodoro Moscoso Bridge is opened to the public.
- 1998: Valor 2002 S.A. acquires Dragados y Construcciones S.A. shares. Valor 2002 S.A. becomes a supermajority shareholder with 74.25% of the shares.
- 2001: Aurea Concesiones de Infraestructura de España buys Valor 2002 S.A. shares. Aurea becomes a supermajority shareholder with 74.25% of the shares.
- 2003: Abertis buys Aurea Concesiones de Infraestructura de España shares. Abertis becomes a supermajority shareholder with 74.25% of the shares.
- 2010: Abertis buys Supra and Company S.E. and Rexach Construction Company shares. Abertis becomes the sole owner by owning 99% of the shares through Abertis Infraestructuras, S.A. (a Societas Europaea based and registered in Spain) and 1% through Autopistas Corporation (a shell company based and registered in Puerto Rico).
