= José Ramón González =

Puerto Rican businessman

President of the Puerto Rico Government Development Bank
- In office 1986–1989
- Governor: Rafael Hernández Colón

Personal details
- Born: San Juan, Puerto Rico
- Education: Yale College (BA); Harvard University (MBA); Harvard Law School (JD)

José Ramón González is a Puerto Rican financial executive. He is the President and chief executive officer of the Federal Home Loan Bank of New York since 2014. He formerly served as Senior Executive Vice President of Oriental Financial Group and former president and CEO of Santander Puerto Rico, Puerto Rico's second largest financial institution. González also served from 1986 to 1989 as president of the Puerto Rico Government Development Bank during the administration of Governor Rafael Hernández Colón. In 2016 he was named to the PROMESA oversight board in charge of resolving the Puerto Rican government-debt crisis Where he served until August 2020
