= Puerto Rico Public–Private Partnerships Authority =

Government-owned corporation of Puerto Rico

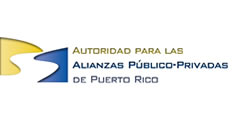

Agency overview
- Formed: June 8, 2009; 17 years ago
- Jurisdiction: executive branch
- Headquarters: San Juan, Puerto Rico
- Agency executive: David Álvarez, President
- Key document: Law No. 29 of 2009
- Website: www.p3.gov.pr

The Puerto Rico Public–Private Partnerships Authority (P3A) (Spanish: Autoridad para las Alianzas Público Privadas de Puerto Rico (APPP)) is a government-owned corporation of Puerto Rico created in order to regulate public–private partnerships (PPP) in Puerto Rico. It is a PPP unit whose responsibilities include promotion and assessment of public-private partnerships, as well as consultancy on PPP projects. Its organic law was enacted by the 15th Legislative Assembly and signed into law by Governor Luis Fortuño.

The Authority is governed by a five-member board of directors, including three appointed by the Governor, one (attorney Luis Berríos-Amadeo) selected by President of the Senate of Puerto Rico, Thomas Rivera Schatz, and another, former San Juan mayor Hernán Padilla, selected by then Speaker of the Puerto Rico House of Representatives Jenniffer González. The Board was headed by Puerto Rico Government Development Bank president Carlos M. García and day-to-day operations are headed by executive director David Alvarez.

Although final decisions are made and PPP contracts signed by the Governor, the chief executive at the time signed an Executive Order delegating that role to Secretary of State Kenneth McClintock, who assumed the role of advocate of Puerto Rico's P3 process.

== See also ==
- List of public–private partnerships in Puerto Rico
