= 1961 Puerto Rican financial referendum =

Referendum on financial-related amendments to Puerto Rican statute

10 December 1961

Results
Choice	Votes	%
Yes	385,369	82.77%
No	80,224	17.23%
Valid votes	465,593	100.00%
Invalid or blank votes	0	0.00%
Total votes	465,593	100.00%
Registered voters/turnout	802,032	58.05%

A referendum on financial issues was held in Puerto Rico on 10 December 1961. The referendum was approved by 82.8% of voters.

In 1961 the United States Congress adopted a joint resolution amending article three of the Puerto Rico Federal Relations Act, providing that said resolution take effect upon approval by a majority of the Puerto Rican electorate in a referendum amending the Constitution of Puerto Rico. The Legislative Assembly of Puerto Rico accordingly approved a joint resolution on September 29, 1961, providing for the holding of said referendum, which in turn passed by majority of the popular vote on December 10, 1961. This referendum added some provisions to the Constitution of Puerto Rico and substituted the wording in the Puerto Rico Federal Relations Act that limited Puerto Rico's debt-incurring powers. This amendment added the full faith and credit pledge wording to the public debt provisions in the Constitution of Puerto Rico, which were not in its original language of 1952.

== Results ==
Choice	Votes	%
For	385,369	82.77
Against	80,224	17.23
Total	465,593	100.00
Registered voters/turnout	802,032	–
Source: Nohlen
