= Bonds issued by Puerto Rico =

Bonds issued by the government of Puerto Rico and its subdivisions are exempt from federal, state, and local taxes (so called "triple tax exemption"). However, unlike other triple tax exempt bonds, Puerto Rican bonds uphold such exemption regardless of where the bond holder resides. (Note: Pub. L. 64–145 §3 "[...] all bonds issued by the government of Porto Rico, or by its authority, shall be exempt from taxation by the government of the United States, or by the government of Porto Rico or of any political or municipal subdivision thereof, or by any state, or by any county, municipality, or other municipal subdivision of any state or territory of the United States, or by the District of Columbia.") This has made Puerto Rican bonds extremely attractive to municipal investors as they may inure from holding a bond issued by a state or municipality different from the one where they reside. This advantage strives from the restriction typically imposed by municipal bonds enjoying triple tax exemption where such exemptions solely apply for bond holders that reside in the state or municipal subdivision that issues them.

This factor, along with many others, led Puerto Rico to issue bonds up to today's outstanding debt of US$71 billion—an amount approximately equal to about 68% of Puerto Rico's gross domestic product (GDP). These actions, along with a series of negative cash flows and a depression, ultimately led to Puerto Rico's government-debt crisis.

== Bonds ==
- The Puerto Rico Sales Tax Revenue Bonds (commonly known as COFINA bonds) are government bonds issued by the Urgent Interest Fund Corporation (COFINA) to pay the extraconstitutional public debt of Puerto Rico. The bonds are primarily used to provide funds to the government of Puerto Rico to repay certain debt obligations to the Government Development Bank and the Public Financing Corporation. They are issued under resolutions adopted by COFINA's board of directors will be payable from and secured by a security interest created by the Resolution in a specified portion of the Puerto Rico Sales and Use Tax ("Pledged Sales Tax"). Legislation enacted in 2006 approved for the first time in Puerto Rico a sales and use tax of 5.5% for the benefit of the central government, and a separate 1.5% for the benefit of municipalities of Puerto Rico. Law No. 91 of 2006 also created a dedicated sales tax fund, to be held and owned by COFINA separate and apart from the government's general fund, and provided, among other things, that each fiscal year the first receipts of the government's Sales and Use Tax, in the amount specified in the law, be deposited in this special dedicated fund and applied to the payment of the Sales Tax Revenue Bonds.
- Tax Revenue Anticipation Notes (TRANS)
