= Marcos Rodriguez Ema =

Puerto Rican politician

Marcos Rodríguez Ema
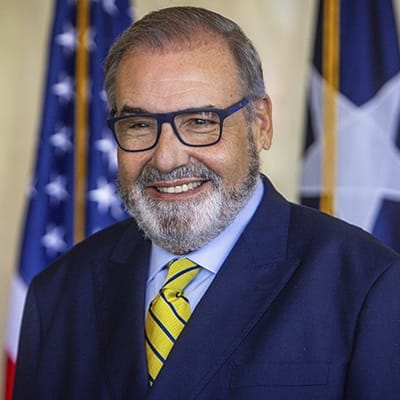

Puerto Rico Chief of Staff
- In office December 4, 2009 – July 31, 2012
- Governor: Luis Fortuño
- Preceded by: Juan Carlos Blanco
- Succeeded by: Miguel Romero

Personal details
- Party: New Progressive Party
- Other political affiliations: Republican
- Education: Georgetown University Law Center (JD)
- Profession: Politician, Attorney, Banker

Marcos Rodríguez-Ema, an attorney, was Chief of Staff to Puerto Rico Governor Luis Fortuño.

Graduated with honors from Georgetown University’s Walsh School of Foreign Service and completing his juris doctor degree at Georgetown University Law Center.

Rodríguez-Ema served as President of the Puerto Rico Government Development Bank during pro-statehood Governor Pedro Rosselló's administration, from 1993 to 1998. He headed the government's privatization efforts at the time and also founded the Puerto Rico Museum of Art, one of the top two art museums in Puerto Rico.

During the 2008 campaign, he was an advisor to Fortuño, served as Executive Director of a blue-ribbon citizens group chaired by Banco Popular de Puerto Rico Chairman of the Board Richard Carrión during the transition that uncovered a $3.2 billion deficit left by the prior administration, but remained in the private sector once the new Governor was sworn in.

In July 2012, Rodríguez Ema left his position as Chief of Staff to serve as a senior advisor and de facto campaign manager for Governor Luis Fortuño’s re-election campaign, focusing on strategic and political matters. He was succeeded in La Fortaleza by Secretary of Labor Miguel Romero.

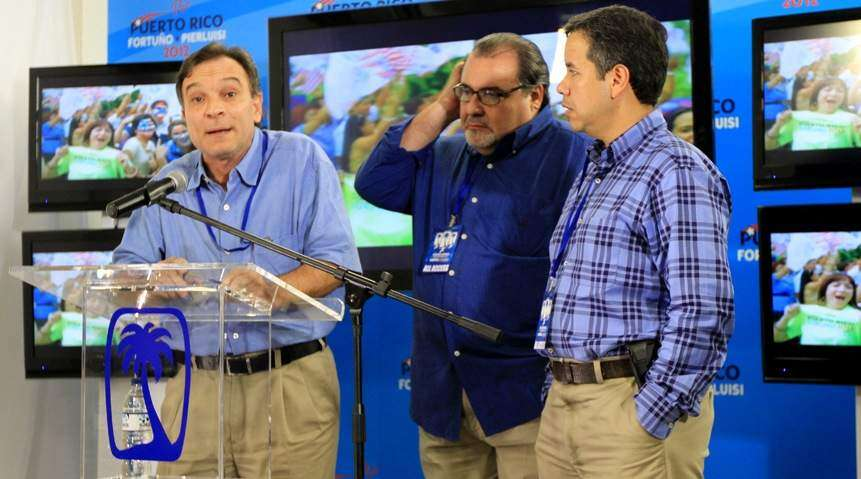
Marcos Rodriguez Ema (center) alongside Angel Cintrón (left) and Miguel Romero (right) during a press conference at the November 2012 elections in Puerto Rico.

After the 2024 November election, Mr. Rodriguez-Ema was appointed by governor-elect Jenniffer Gonzalez to be part of her transition team.

On December 2010, Rodríguez-Ema stated that he would kick out the students protesting in the University of Puerto Rico. He has not apologized for his expressions.

Rodríguez Ema is currently a Capital Member at the Puerto Rico law firm McConnell Valdés, where he leads the Government Affairs & Public Policy Practice Team and chairs the firm’s Business Development Committee.
