= Puerto Rico Public Finance Corporation =

Government-owned corporation of Puerto Rico

Puerto Rico Public Financing Corporation
- Headquarters: San Juan, Puerto Rico
- Established: 1984 (42 years ago)
- President: Juan C. Batlle
- Currency: USD

The Puerto Rico Public Finance Corporation (PFC) —Spanish: Corporación para el Financiamiento Público de Puerto Rico (CFP)— is the government-owned corporation that issues bonds to finance the different agencies of the executive branch of the government of Puerto Rico. The corporation is a subsidiary of the Puerto Rico Government Development Bank.

== See also ==
- List of bonds issued by Puerto Rico
