= John E. Nixon =

American accountant

John E. Nixon (born 1972) was the director of the Michigan Department of Technology, Management and Budget. He is also the Value for Money Group Executive on Governor Rick Snyder's cabinet.

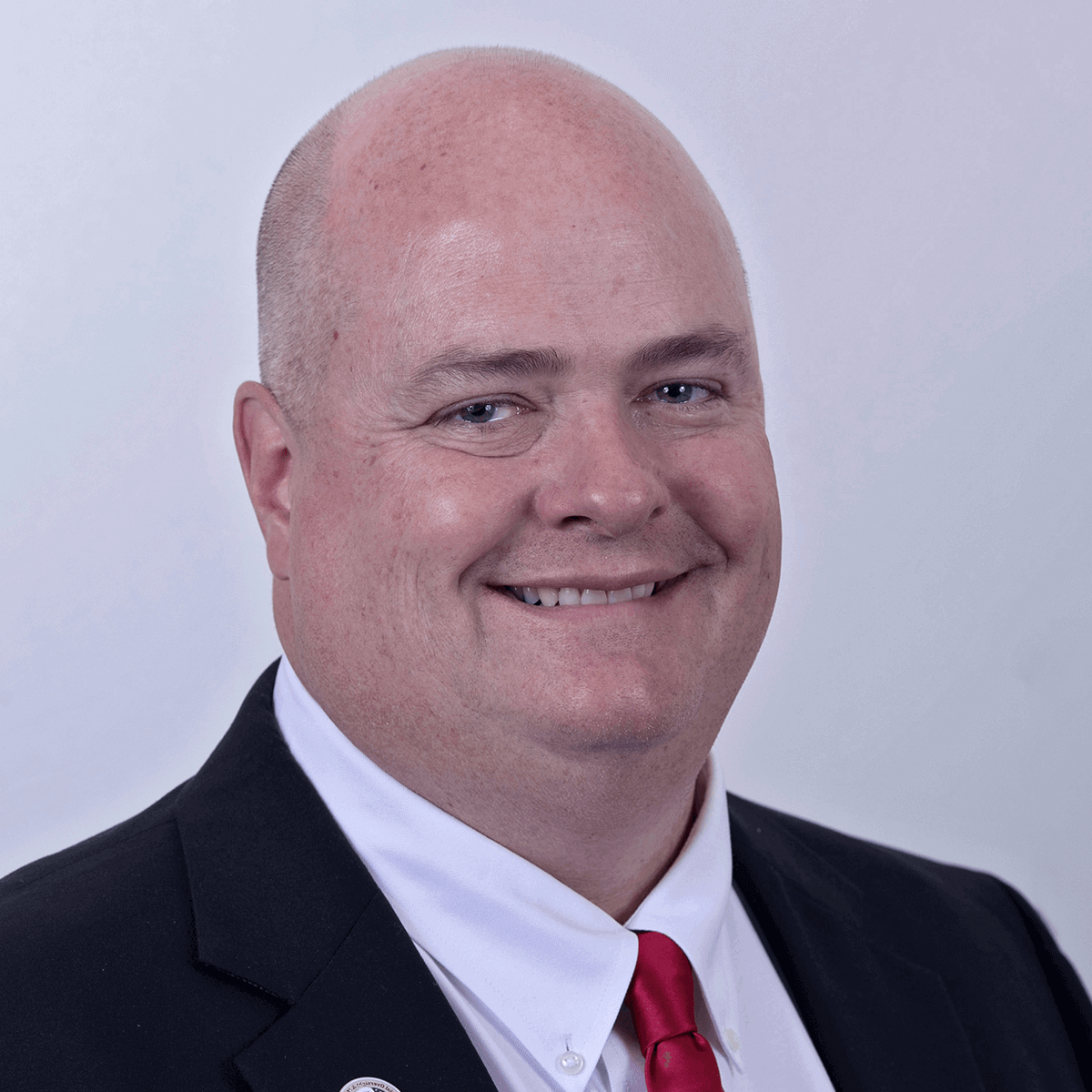

== Education ==
Nixon earned a Bachelor of Science in business and corporate finance from Brigham Young University in 1996. In 2002, he graduated from the University of Utah, where he earned a Master of Business Administration with an emphasis on information technology. Nixon graduated as members of both Phi Kappa Phi and Beta Gamma Sigma Honors societies and graduated as Outstanding Academic Scholar of his class. Nixon is also fluent in Spanish.

In 2003 he became a Certified Public Accountant.

Nixon is a member of the Church of Jesus Christ of Latter-day Saints.

== Utah career ==
From 2001 to 2005, Nixon served as the chief financial officer and deputy director of the Utah Department of Workforce Services.

Nixon served both Governor Jon Huntsman, Jr. and Governor Gary Herbert as the director of Planning & Budget from 2006 to 2010. While serving as the director of planning and budget, Nixon directed Utah's $11 billion budget and oversaw Demographic and Economic Analysis, State and Local Planning and Performance Management functions within the Governor's Office.

Prior to working in government, Nixon held the position of CFO for a privately held golf company as well as working in the financial services industry. Nixon was also an adjunct professor in the MPA program at the University of Utah.

== Michigan career ==
In 2010 Governor Rick Snyder offered Nixon the position to head up both the State Budget Office and the Departments of Technology and Management. As the director of the Michigan Department of Technology, Management and Budget (DTMB) Nixon oversees the state's $48 billion annual budget and the department's 2,500 employees.

As the director of DTMB, Nixon focuses on creating Michigan into one of the most innovative, efficient and responsive governments in the world by providing vital administrative and technology services and information, enabling Michigan's reinvention. He left the Snyder administration in 2014.

== Return to Utah ==
In March 2014 Nixon became part of the University of Utah administration, becoming chief business officer of the university.

== Awards and recognition ==
- 2008 – Utah Business Magazine: Public Sector's Chief Financial Officer of the Year
- 2009 – Dr. G Homer Durham Award: Distinguished Service
- 2010 – Utah Business Magazine: Forty under Forty top business leaders
- 2011 – National Association of State Budget Officers: past president
- 2011 – The Antigua Forum: Selected as an international representative to speak about governmental reform
- 2012 – Government Technology Magazine: Top 25 Doers, Dreamers & Drivers
- 2012 – Michigan Association of Certified Public Accountants: Outstanding CPA in Government
- 2012 – Governing Magazine: Public Official of the Year

== Sources ==
- Crains Detroit article on Nixon
- mlive bio of Nixon
- Michigan government bio of Nixon
