= General obligation bond =

Type of municipal bond in the US

A general obligation bond is a common type of municipal bond in the United States that is secured by a state or local government's pledge to use legally-available resources, including tax revenues, to repay bondholders.

Most general obligation pledges at the local government level include a pledge to levy a property tax to meet debt service requirements, and holders of general obligation bonds then have a right to compel the borrowing government to levy that tax to satisfy the local government's obligation. Because property owners are usually reluctant to risk losing their holding from unpaid property tax bills, credit rating agencies often consider a general obligation pledge to have very strong credit quality and frequently assign them investment grade ratings. If local property owners do not pay their property taxes on time in any given year, a government entity is required to increase its property tax rate by as much as is legally allowable in a following year to make up for any delinquencies. Between the taxpayer delinquency and the higher property tax rate in the following year, the general obligation pledge requires the local government to pay debt service coming due with its available resources.

== Types ==
State law generally sets the conditions under which a local government can issue general obligation debt, including the type of security that is available:

- A limited-tax general obligation pledge requires a local government to levy a property tax sufficient to meet its debt service obligations but only up to a statutory limit. Generally, local governments already levy a property tax and can choose to use a portion of the property tax it already levies, use some other revenue stream, or increase its property tax by an amount equal to its debt service payments.
- An unlimited-tax general obligation pledge is identical to a limited-tax pledge except that the local government is required to levy a rate at whatever level is necessary, theoretically up to 100%, to recover a shortfall from taxpayer delinquencies. An unlimited-tax pledge must often follow a voter authorization in which local residents agree to raise property taxes by an amount equal to debt service requirements over the life of the bonds. That feature provides the political advantage of voter affirmation of the use of the bonds and allows the local government to avoid raising its property tax directly or to find room in its budget to pay for debt service.

All things being equal, credit rating agencies and investors can consider an unlimited property tax pledge to be materially stronger than a limited-tax pledge. That perception could thus potentially allow a local government to borrow at a lower interest rate, saving its taxpayers' money over the life of the bonds. Despite that advantage, many states, such as California under Proposition 13, do not allow local governments to issue unlimited-tax general obligation debt without a public vote.
