= Public debt of Puerto Rico =

Money borrowed by the government of Puerto Rico through the issue of securities

Distribution of Puerto Rico's outstanding debt as of October 18, 2013
1. Government-owned corporations (37.0%)
2. GO bonds (29.0%)
3. COFINA (22.0%)
4. Other (3.00%)
5. Retirement systems (4.00%)
6. Municipalities (6.00%)

The public debt of Puerto Rico is the money borrowed by the government of Puerto Rico through the issue of government bonds by the Government Development Bank and other government agencies.

== History ==
In May 2007, local economists expressed serious concerns when it was revealed that the Puerto Rico public debt equaled to 76% of its gross national product (GNP), making it one of the most indebted countries by percentage in the world, even more than the United States. During the fiscal years 2016-2017 debt rose from 93% to 95% of its gross national product (GNP).

Economists have criticized the government's fiscal policy, whose level of expenditures and indebtness has increased significantly within the past decade while the economy was grown at a much slower pace. Between 2000 and 2006 alone, Puerto Rico's GNP rose 5.37%, while its public debt's relation to GNP rose 18%.

On February 4, 2014 Standard & Poor's downgraded the debt of Puerto Rico to junk status. By early 2017, the Puerto Rican government-debt crisis posed serious problems for the government which was saddled with outstanding bond debt of $70 billion or $12,000 per capita at a time with a 45 percent poverty rate and 12.4% unemployment that is more than twice the mainland U.S. average. The debt had been increasing during a decade long recession.

The Commonwealth had been defaulting on many debts, including bonds, since 2015. With debt payments due, the Governor was facing the risk of a government shutdown and failure to fund the managed care health system. "Without action before April, Puerto Rico’s ability to execute contracts for Fiscal Year 2018 with its managed care organizations will be threatened, thereby putting at risk beginning July 1, 2017 the health care of up to 900,000 poor U.S. citizens living in Puerto Rico", according to a letter sent to Congress by the Secretary of the Treasury and the Secretary of Health and Human Services. They also said that "Congress must enact measures recommended by both Republicans and Democrats that fix Puerto Rico’s inequitable health care financing structure and promote sustained economic growth."

Initially, the oversight board created under PROMESA called for Puerto Rico's governor Ricardo Rosselló to deliver a fiscal turnaround plan by January 28. Just before that deadline, the control board gave the Commonwealth government until February 28 to present a fiscal plan (including negotiations with creditors for restructuring debt) to solve the problems. A moratorium on lawsuits by debtors was extended to May 31. It is essential for Puerto Rico to reach restructuring deals to avoid a bankruptcy-like process under PROMESA. An internal survey conducted by the Puerto Rican Economists Association revealed that the majority of Puerto Rican economists reject the policy recommendations of the Board and the Rosselló government, with more than 80% of economists arguing in favor of auditing the debt.

According to the Government Development Bank, statehood might be the only solution to the debt crisis. Congress has the power to vote to allow Chapter 9 protection without the need for statehood, but in late 2015 there was very little support in the House for this concept. Other benefits to statehood include increased disability benefits and Medicaid funding, the right to vote in Presidential elections and the higher (federal) minimum wage.

=== Recent developments ===
By early August 2017, the debt was $72 billion in an era with a 45% poverty rate. The island's financial oversight board said that it would investigate how the debt was caused "and its relationship to the fiscal crisis". The agency also planned to institute two days off without pay per month for government employees, down from the original plan of four days per month; the latter had been expected to achieve $218 million in savings. Governor Ricardo Rosselló rejected this plan as unjustified and unnecessary. In February 2021 governor Wanda Vázquez Garced rejected the agreement reached by the board to reduce the island's debt by 70% arguing the plan was too burdensome for the pensioners and that the bill needed to be approved by the legislature. A new agreement was reached in 2021 to reduce the debt by 80% and governor Pedro Pierluisi supports the agreement.

In 2022, the United States Supreme Court held that the territorial clause of the U.S. constitution allows wide congressional latitude in mandating "reasonable" tax and benefit schemes in Puerto Rico and the other territories that are different from the states, but the Court did not address the incorporated/unincorporated distinction. As a result, the status quo remains, so the U.S. government still defines the Commonwealth of Puerto Rico as a U.S. unincorporated territory.

In May 2023, the United States Supreme Court ruled against a Puerto Rican media organization in its quest to obtain documents from the Federal Council to oversee the island's financial restructuring. The judges said that Congress has not been clear enough about lifting the Board of Financial Supervision and Management's sovereign immunity, which would allow Centro de Periodismo Investigativo Inc. to subpoena the board over documents related to the restructuring of the economy of Puerto Rico..

In June 2025, Puerto Rico Senate President Thomas Rivera Schatz introduced a resolution demanding that the United States Congress and the President of the United States dissolve the Puerto Rico Fiscal Oversight Board.

== See also ==
- Economy of the United States
- Welfare in Puerto Rico
- Puerto Rico (proposed state)
- Puerto Rican status referendum, 2017
- Puerto Rican government-debt crisis
- Puerto Rico government budget balance
- Budget of the Government of Puerto Rico
- Puerto Rico Chapter 9 Uniformity Act of 2015
