= Puerto Rico Municipal Financing Agency =

Government-owned corporation of Puerto Rico

- Headquarters: San Juan, Puerto Rico
- Established: June 30, 1972; 54 years ago
- President: Juan C. Batlle
- Currency: USD

The Puerto Rico Municipal Financing Agency (MFA) —Spanish: Agencia para el Financiamiento Municipal de Puerto Rico (AFM)— is the municipal bond issuer and an intragovernmental bank of the government of Puerto Rico. The Agency is a government-owned corporation of the government of Puerto Rico and a principal affiliate of the Puerto Rico Government Development Bank.

== Bonds issued ==
- Series A Bonds
- Series B Refunding Bonds
- Series C Refunding Bonds
