= Puerto Rico Highways and Transportation Authority =

Government corporation in Puerto Rico

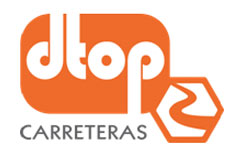

Agency overview
- Formed: June 23, 1965; 61 years ago
- Preceding agency: Highways Authority
- Jurisdiction: executive branch
- Headquarters: San Juan, Puerto Rico
- Agency executive: Edwin E. Gonzalez-Montalvo, Executive Director
- Parent department: Department of Transportation and Public Works
- Key document: 74 (PDF). June 25, 1965.

The Puerto Rico Highways and Transportation Authority (PRHTA) —Spanish: Autoridad de Carreteras y Transportación (ACT)— is the government-owned corporation of Puerto Rico charged with constructing, operating, and maintaining roads, bridges, avenues, highways, tunnels, public parkings, tolls, and other transit facilities in Puerto Rico. The Authority is also charged with providing an integrated transportation system to Puerto Rico and its people.

== Public-private partnerships ==
Name	Operates
Autopistas de Puerto Rico	Teodoro Moscoso Bridge
Metropistas	PR-5 & PR-22

== Executive directors ==
2009–present: Rubén Hernández Gregorat

== See also ==
- List of highways in Puerto Rico
