= Intragovernmental holdings =

Securities held by governments

In public finance, intragovernmental holdings (known as intragovernmental debt or intragovernmental obligations) are debt obligations that a government owes to its own agencies. These agencies may receive or spend money unevenly throughout the year, or receive it for payout at a future date, as in the case of a pension fund. Lending the excess funds to the government, typically on the accounts of its treasury, enables the government to calculate its net cash requirements over time.

== United States ==
In the United States, intragovernmental holdings are primarily composed of the Medicare trust funds, the Social Security Trust Fund, and Federal Financing Bank securities. A small amount of marketable securities are held by government accounts.

== See also ==
- Government debt

U.S. specific:

- United States public debt
- United States Treasury security
- Federal Financing Bank
- Bureau of Public Debt
- Federal Reserve System
- Office of Management and Budget (OMB)
