= H.R. 870 (114th Congress) =

Super Chapter 9
- Long title: To amend title 11 of the United States Code to treat Puerto Rico as a State for purposes of chapter 9 of such title relating to the adjustment of debts of municipalities.
- Announced in: the 114th United States Congress
- Sponsored by: Rep. Pedro R. Pierluisi (D-PR-At Large)
- Number of co-sponsors: 41

Codification
- U.S.C. sections affected: 11 U.S.C. § 101(52)

Legislative history
- Introduced in the House as H.R. 870 by Rep. Pedro R. Pierluisi (D-PR-At Large) on February 11, 2015; Committee consideration by United States House Committee on the Judiciary, United States House Judiciary Subcommittee on Regulatory Reform, Commercial and Antitrust Law

H.R. 870, long title "to amend Title 11 of the United States Code to treat Puerto Rico as a State for purposes of chapter 9 of such title relating to the adjustment of debts of municipalities," is a bill to amend section 101(52) of Title 11 of the United States Code, to define Puerto Rico as a state regarding Chapter 9 bankruptcy protections. Its short title is the "Puerto Rico Chapter 9 Uniformity Act of 2015" and it has been called "Super Chapter 9" in public debates. As of April 2016, the bill had gained 41 cosponsors.

== See also ==
- List of bills in the 114th United States Congress
