= List of public–private partnerships in Puerto Rico =

This is a list of public–private partnerships in Puerto Rico. Such partnerships exist in the transportation sector and are being developed in other sectors, including public utilities, education and social programs.

Name in English	Name in Spanish	Status	Sector
Aerostar Airport Holdings	Aerostar	in development	transportation
Aqueducts and Sewers Authority	Autoridad de Acueductos y Alcantarillados	in research	public utilities
Electric Power Authority	Autoridad de Energía Eléctrica	in research	public utilities
Luis Muñoz Marín International Airport	Aeropuerto Internacional Luis Muñoz Marín	awaiting approval	transportation
Metro Highways	Metropistas	established	transportation
New Beginnings	Nuevo Comienzo	in research	social programs
Puerto Rico Expressways	Autopistas de Puerto Rico	established	transportation
Schools for the 21st Century	Escuelas del Siglo 21	in development	education
