= COFINA =

Government-owned corporation of Puerto Rico

Puerto Rico Urgent Interest Fund Corporation
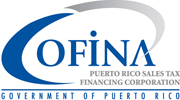
- Headquarters: Guaynabo, Puerto Rico
- Established: December 26, 2006; 19 years ago
- Executive Director: José R. Otero-Freiría
- Currency: USD

The Puerto Rico Urgent Interest Fund Corporation (also known as the Puerto Rico Sales Tax Financing Corporation) —Spanish: Corporación del Fondo de Interés Apremiante (COFINA)— is a government-owned corporation of Puerto Rico that issues government bonds and uses other financing mechanisms to pay and refinance the public debt of Puerto Rico. The Corporation is a subsidiary of the Government Development Bank and was created by Law No. 291 of 2006. Bonds issued by COFINA are called Puerto Rico Sales Tax Revenue Bonds.

== Background ==
The Corporation receives half of the state government portion of the Puerto Rico Sales and Use Tax (SUT) (2.75%, or half of the out of the state government’s portion of 6%) and is authorized to use such portion pay or finance, in whole or in part, or fund:

1. certain debt obligations of the government of Puerto Rico payable solely from government budgetary appropriations and outstanding as of June 30, 2006;
2. the debt of the Department of Treasury with the Government Development Bank; and
3. others

As of May 2011, COFINA had issued over $14.4 billion in bonds pursuant to its Enabling Act, as amended, of which $13.4 billion were outstanding. As an independent corporation, COFINA has the same powers, rights and faculties as the Puerto Rico Government Development Bank under its Constitutional Charter.

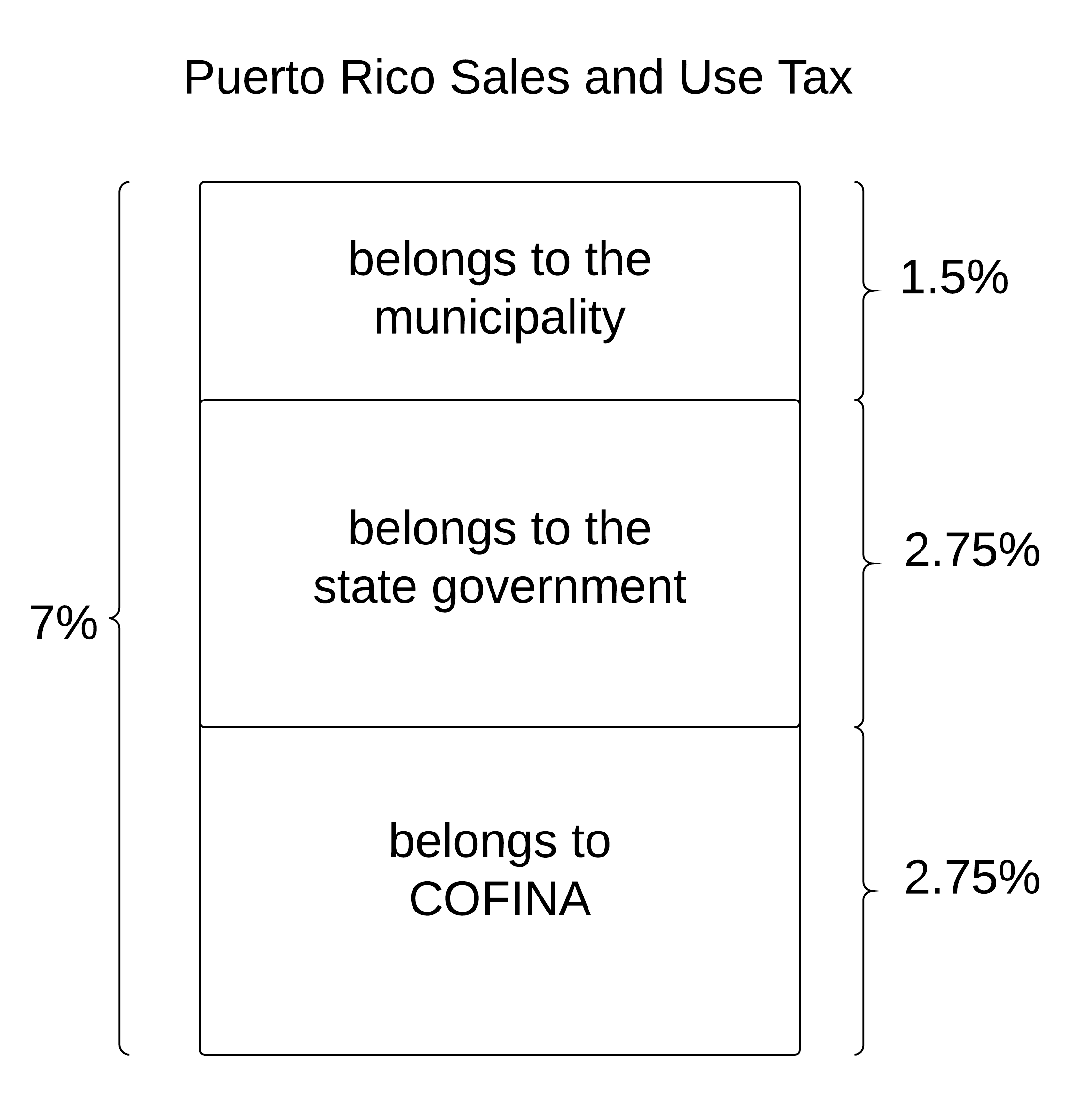
Components of the Puerto Rico Sales and Use Tax, showing which part belongs to COFINA.
