= Taxation in Puerto Rico =

Tax laws of Puerto Rico

Taxation in Puerto Rico consists of taxes paid to the United States federal government and taxes paid to the Government of the Commonwealth of Puerto Rico. Payment of taxes to the federal government, both personal and corporate, is done through the federal Internal Revenue Service (IRS), while payment of taxes to the Commonwealth government is done through the Puerto Rico Department of Treasury (Departamento de Hacienda).

Puerto Rico is an unincorporated territory of the United States and Puerto Ricans are U.S. citizens; however, Puerto Rico is not a U.S. state, but a U.S. insular area. Consequently, while all Puerto Rico residents pay federal taxes, many residents are not required to pay federal income taxes. Aside from income tax, U.S. federal taxes include customs taxes, federal commodity taxes, and federal payroll taxes (Social Security, Medicare, and Unemployment taxes).

Not all Puerto Rican employees and corporations pay federal income taxes. Federal law requires payment of federal income tax from the following residents and corporations only: federal government employees in Puerto Rico, (Note: In July 2018, approximately 21% of the labor force on Puerto Rico were employed by the government, however, this includes both the commonwealth and federal governments.) (Note: In April 2020, there were approximately 14,000 federal employees in Puerto Rico, plus 9,550 retired federal employees, who are (or were) required to pay federal income taxes on local income, for a total of approximately 25,000 federal employees paying federal income taxes. This figure does not include the US military personnel stationed there, who must also pay federal income taxes, nor the various other categories of federal income tax payees.) residents who are members of the United States military, those with income sources outside of Puerto Rico, those individuals or corporations who do business with the federal government, and those Puerto Rico-based corporations that intend to send funds to the United States.

== Federal taxes ==
Residents of Puerto Rico are required to pay most types of federal taxes. Specifically, residents of Puerto Rico pay customs taxes, (Note: It is also a misconception that the customs taxes collected by the U.S. on products manufactured in Puerto Rico are all returned to the Puerto Rico Treasury. This is not the case. Such customs taxes are returned only for rum products, and even then, the US Treasury keeps a portion of those taxes.) Federal commodity taxes, and all payroll taxes (also known as FICA taxes, which include (a) Social Security, (b) Medicare, and Unemployment taxes). Puerto Ricans on the island paid over $4 billion in federal taxes in fiscal year 2021.

=== Federal income taxes ===
Puerto Ricans earning income from Puerto Rican sources generally do not have to pay federal income taxes. However, residents falling within the following categories must pay tax on their income to the United States federal government, via the Internal Revenue Service:

Puerto Rico residents who:

- work for the federal government such as US Post Office employees, and federal agents of any of the federal executive and judicial branches located in Puerto Rico (Note: It has been estimated there are currently some 25,000 federal employees in PR.)
- do business with the federal government
- are members of the U.S. military
- earned income from sources outside Puerto Rico and
- Puerto Rico-based corporations that intend to send funds to the U.S.

However, notwithstanding these requirements, some residents of Puerto Rico are not required to file federal income tax returns because their income falls below the poverty threshold. As of 2019, the median income of Puerto Rico was $20,166, which falls below the poverty threshold of $24,400. The IRS does not require individuals or households below the poverty threshold to pay federal income tax.

From 1998 up until 2006, Puerto Rico consistently contributed more than $4 billion annually in federal taxes and impositions. The average taxes paid by Puerto Ricans—including not just federal income taxes, but other federal and non-federal taxes as well—in 2002 was $3,071 per capita, which was lower than in the states, where the average taxes paid was $9,426. This represented 28% of personal income, compared to 30% in the states.

As the cutoff point for income taxation in Puerto Rico is lower than that imposed by the U.S. IRS code and because the per-capita income in Puerto Rico is much lower than the average per-capita income of the US states, more Puerto Rico residents pay income taxes to the local taxation authority than if the IRS code were applied to the island.

The Puerto Rican government has a wider set of fiscal responsibilities than US State and local governments. As a result, the Commonwealth government imposes a higher income tax to make up for revenue funds that would otherwise be available through state-like funding resulting from federal income tax.

Only certain residents of Puerto Rico are required to file federal income tax returns. According to the Internal Revenue Service:

In general, United States citizens and resident aliens who are bona fide residents of Puerto Rico during the entire tax year, which for most individuals is January 1 to December 31, are only required to file a U.S. federal income tax return if they have income sources outside of Puerto Rico or if they are employees of the U.S. government. Bona fide residents of Puerto Rico generally do not report income received from sources within Puerto Rico on their U.S. income tax return. However, they should report all income received from sources outside Puerto Rico on their U.S. income tax return. Residents of Puerto Rico who are employed by the government of the United States or who are members of the armed forces of the United States also should report all income received for their services to the government of the United States on their U. S. income tax return. United States citizens or resident aliens who are not bona fide residents of Puerto Rico during the entire tax year are required to report all income from whatever source derived on their U.S. income tax return. However, a U.S. citizen who changes residence from Puerto Rico to the United States and who was a bona fide resident of Puerto Rico at least two years before changing residence can exclude from U.S. taxable income the Puerto Rican source income received while residing in Puerto Rico during the taxable year of such change of residence.

Bona fide residents of Puerto Rico cannot claim deductions and/or credits allocable to or chargeable against Puerto Rican source income that is excluded from a U.S. tax return. The deductions and credits not attributable to specific income must be divided between excluded income from sources in Puerto Rico and income from all other sources to find the part that can be deducted or credited on a U.S. tax return. Examples of deductions not attributable to specific income include alimony, the standard deduction, and certain itemized deductions such as medical expenses, charitable contributions, and real estate taxes and mortgage interest on your personal residence. Personal exemptions are generally allowed in full. If you have taxable Puerto Rican source income on your U.S. income tax return, then you can claim a credit for foreign taxes paid to Puerto Rico. However, you are not allowed to claim a credit for foreign taxes paid with respect to Puerto Rican source income that is excluded from a U.S. tax return. Therefore, to properly calculate your foreign tax credit, you must reduce your foreign taxes paid by the amount of taxes allocable to excluded Puerto Rican source income.

=== Other US Federal taxes ===
While the Commonwealth government has its own tax laws, Puerto Rico residents are also required to pay US federal taxes, but most residents do not have to pay the federal personal income tax.

Employers in Puerto Rico are subject to both Federal Insurance Contributions Act (FICA) tax (a payroll withholding tax, which funds Social Security and Medicare) and the Federal Unemployment Tax Act (FUTA). Employers in Puerto Rico must withhold the employee portion of FICA taxes from their employees' wages and contribute the employer portion of FICA.

In 2016, Puerto Rico paid close to $3.5 billion into the US Treasury in the form of Business Income Taxes, Individual income tax withheld and FICA tax, Individual income tax payments and SECA tax, Unemployment insurance tax, Estate and trust income tax, Estate tax, Gift tax and Excise taxes.

==== Social Security and Supplemental Security Income (SSI) benefits ====
In general, "many federal social welfare programs have been extended to Puerto Ric[o] residents, but usually with caps inferior to those allocated to the states." (Note: For a comprehensive coverage of Federal programs made extensive to Puerto Rico see Richard Cappalli's Federal Aid to Puerto Rico (1970).)

Residents of Puerto Rico who have paid into Social Security are eligible for benefits upon retirement. Residents of Puerto Rico who have paid into Social Security however are excluded from receiving Supplemental Security Income (SSI) benefits would they otherwise qualify. Commonwealth of Puerto Rico residents, unlike residents of the Commonwealth of the Northern Mariana Islands and residents of the 50 States, currently do not qualify for SSI. (SSI benefits are generally for low-income, disabled, as well as for elderly.) On 10 April 2020, the U.S. Court of Appeals for the First Circuit ruled that residents of Puerto Rico were eligible for SSI benefits, finding that residents of Puerto Rico make substantial contributions to the federal treasury in higher amounts than taxpayers in at least six states and the territory of the Northern Mariana Islands. The decision was appealed and the US Supreme Court overturned the 1st Circuit Court of Appeals on 21 April 2022, denying SSI benefits eligibility to residents of Puerto Rico.

==== Medicaid and Medicare benefits ====
Puerto Rico receives less than 15% of the Medicaid funding it would receive were it a state and Medicare providers receive less-than-full state-like reimbursements for services rendered to beneficiaries in Puerto Rico even though the latter paid fully into the system.

== Commonwealth taxes ==
The main body of domestic statutory tax law in Puerto Rico is the Código de Rentas Internas de Puerto Rico (Internal Revenue Code of Puerto Rico). The code organizes commonwealth laws covering commonwealth income tax, payroll taxes, gift taxes, estate taxes and statutory excise taxes. All federal employees, those who do business with the federal government, Puerto Rico-based corporations that intend to send funds to the US, and some others also pay federal income taxes (for example, Puerto Rico residents who earned income from sources outside Puerto Rico. In addition, because the cutoff point for income taxation is lower than that of the US IRS code and because the per-capita income in Puerto Rico is much lower than the average per-capita income on the U.S. mainland, more Puerto Rico residents pay income taxes to the local taxation authority than if the IRS code were applied to the island. That occurs because "the Commonwealth of Puerto Rico government has a wider set of [fiscal] responsibilities than do U.S. State and local governments."

=== Property Tax ===
Property taxes are the main fund of the 78 municipalities of Puerto Rico.

=== Sales and Use Tax ===
The Puerto Rico Sales and Use Tax (SUT, Spanish: Impuesto a las Ventas y Uso, IVU) is the combined sales and use tax applied to most sales in Puerto Rico. As of 2020, the tax rate is 11.5%: 1.0% of the tax collected goes to the municipality where the sale was executed (there are 78 municipios - municipalities), and 10.5% of the tax collected goes to Government of Puerto Rico ("state" level). Furthermore, half of the portion that belongs to the state government is destined to the Urgent Interest Fund Corporation (COFINA) to pay the public debt of Puerto Rico, making it a three-tier tax.

In July 2006, the government approved Law Number 117, The 2006 Contributive Justice Law, which established a tax with a 5.5% rate at state level and an optional 1.5% rate at municipal level. The tax went into effect on 15 November 2006. The tax is better known as the Sales and Use Tax' (Impuesto sobre Ventas y Uso), often referred to by its Spanish acronym "IVU". The law amended Article B of the Code and created sub-article BB. On 29 July 2007, the government approved Law Number 80, making the tax mandatory for all municipalities of the commonwealth. Also, the tax rates were changed to 6% at the state level and 1% at the municipal level.

On 1 July 2015, the sales tax rate was increased from 7% to 11.5%, in response to a suffering economy. The new tax contributes 1% to the municipality level and 10.5% to the "state" level. The IVU was scheduled to expire on 1 April 2016, to be replaced with a value-added tax (VAT) of 10.5% for the state level, with the 1% IVU continuing for the municipalities. On 2 May 2016 the House of Representatives voted to repeal the adoption of value added tax (VAT), followed shortly by the Senate on 5 May 2016. The Legislature decided to continue the existing Sales and Use Taxation (SUT) system.

In June 2025, the Puerto Rican Senate approved House Bill 505, which imposes a 4% tax on new individual beneficiaries under Law 60-2019, known as the Puerto Rican Incentives Code. The bill is part of a broader review of the tax incentive system, amid a public debate on the law's real benefits for the local economy.

== Import/export taxes ==
A common misconception is that customs taxes (also called import/export taxes) collected by the U.S. government on products manufactured in Puerto Rico are all returned to the Puerto Rico Treasury. That is not the case, and such taxes are returned to the Puerto Rico Treasury only for rum products. Even then, the US Treasury keeps a portion of the taxes.

== See also ==
- Federal voting rights in Puerto Rico
- Jones–Shafroth Act
- Law of Puerto Rico
- Legal profession in Puerto Rico
- No taxation without representation
- Puerto Rican citizenship
- Puerto Ricans in the United States
