= Authority for the Financing of the Infrastructure of Puerto Rico =

Government-owned corporation of Puerto Rico

Puerto Rico Infrastructure Financing Authority
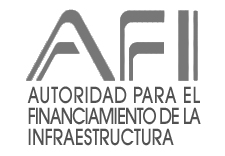

Agency overview
- Formed: June 21, 1988; 38 years ago
- Jurisdiction: executive branch
- Headquarters: San Juan, Puerto Rico
- Agency executive: José E. Basora Segundo, Executive Director
- Key document: Law No. 4 of 1998
- Website: www.afi.pr.gov

The Authority for the Financing of the Infrastructure of Puerto Rico Spanish: Autoridad para el Financiamiento de la Infraestructura de Puerto Rico (AFI)— is a government-owned corporation of Puerto Rico that grants administrative and financial assistance to other Puerto Rico government-owned corporations in order to develop facilities and improve the infrastructure of Puerto Rico.
