= David Skeel =

American law professor (born 1961)

Chair of the Financial Oversight and Management Board for Puerto Rico
- Incumbent
- Assumed office October 7, 2020
- Preceded by: José Carrión

Personal details
- Born: September 10, 1961 (age 65)
- Party: Democratic
- Education: University of North Carolina, Chapel Hill (BA); University of Virginia (JD)

David Arthur Skeel, Jr. (born September 10, 1961) is an American law professor specializing in bankruptcy law and corporate law. He is the S. Samuel Arsht Professor of Corporate Law at the University of Pennsylvania Law School, a position he has held since 2004.

== Biography ==
Skeel received a B.A. from the University of North Carolina at Chapel Hill and a J.D. from the University of Virginia School of Law. From 1987 to 1988, he clerked for the Honorable Walter K. Stapleton of the United States Court of Appeals for the Third Circuit.

From 1988 to 1990, he was an associate in the law firm Duane, Morris, and Heckscher, within the firm's reorganization and finance department. From 1990 to 1998, Skeel taught at Temple University School of Law, where he was an associate professor from 1993 to 1998 and an assistant professor from 1990 to 1993.

Skeel joined the University of Pennsylvania Law School in 1999. He specializes in corporate law, and is the S. Samuel Arsht Professor of Corporate Law, a position he has held since 2004. He has won the Lindback Award (2004), the Harvey Levin Award for Excellence in Teaching (1999, 2002 & 2011), and the Robert A. Gorman Award (2010).

In 2016, he was named to the PROMESA oversight board in charge of resolving the Puerto Rican government-debt crisis.

== Publications ==
- 2014. True Paradox: How Christianity Makes Sense of Our Complex World. InterVarsity Press
- 2011. The New Financial Deal: Understanding the Dodd-Frank Act and its (Unintended) Consequences
- 2006. Icarus in the Boardroom: The Fundamental Flaws in Corporate America and Where They Came From. Oxford UP
- 2001. Debt’s Dominion: A History of Bankruptcy Law in America. Princeton UP
