= Azadeh Shahshahani =

American human rights lawyer (born 1979)

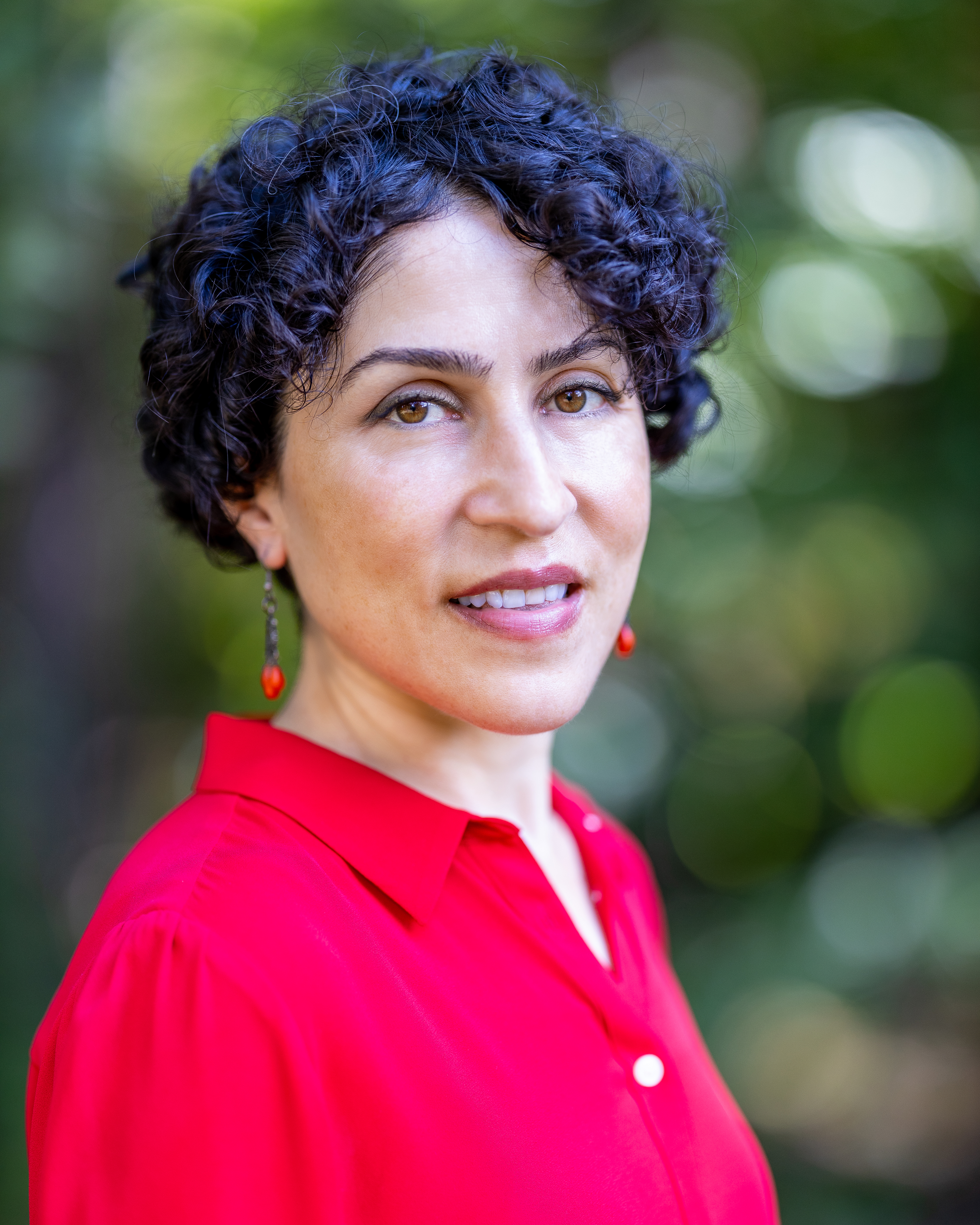
Azadeh N. Shahshahani, by Jonathan Banks, Journey Brave Photography

Azadeh N. Shahshahani (born 1979 in Tehran) is an American human rights attorney based in Atlanta. She is the legal and advocacy director for Project South. She previously served as president of the National Lawyers Guild and director of the National Security/Immigrants' Rights Project for the American Civil Liberties Union (ACLU) of Georgia.

== Early life and education ==
Shahshahani was born in Tehran a few days after the 1979 Iranian Revolution. She received her J.D. from the University of Michigan Law School, where she served as article editor for the Michigan Journal of International Law. Shahshahani also has a master's degree in modern Middle Eastern and North African studies from the University of Michigan.

== Career ==
Shahshahani has worked for two decades in the U.S. South to protect the human rights of immigrant, Black, and Muslim communities.

She is the author or editor of several human rights reports, including the report Imprisoned Justice: Inside Two Immigrant Detention Centers in Georgia; the report Inside Atlanta's Immigration Cages, which helped persuade the City of Atlanta to stop detaining immigrants for ICE at the city jail; as well as the 2020 Project South complaint that brought national and international attention to medical abuses against women's bodies at the Irwin County Detention Center.

Shahshahani has also served as counsel in lawsuits on behalf of a deported U.S. citizen, a Muslim woman forced to remove her head covering at a courthouse, detained immigrants subjected to forced labor at the corporate-run Stewart Detention Center, immigrant women survivors of medical abuse at the Irwin County Detention Center, and many others who have suffered human rights violations.

Shahshahani has served as a trial monitor in Turkey, an election monitor in Venezuela and Honduras, and as a member of the jury in people's tribunals on Mexico, the Philippines, and Brazil. She has appeared before the Inter-American Commission on Human Rights to testify about medical abuse against migrant women at the Irwin County Detention Center. She has also participated in international fact-finding delegations to post-revolutionary Tunisia and Egypt as well as a delegation focused on the situation of Palestinian political prisoners.

Shahshahani serves on the advisory council of the American Association of Jurists. She previously served as a board member of Defending Rights & Dissent.

Shahshahani has appeared on Democracy Now! and BBC; has been interviewed by NPR and The World; and has been quoted by The New York Times, The Washington Post, CNN, The Guardian, The Atlanta Journal-Constitution, and other outlets.

== Writings ==
Shahshahani writes frequently for various national and international publications such as The Nation, The Guardian, Al Jazeera, HuffPost, Salon.com, Slate, and Time on a range of issues pertaining to immigrants' rights, discrimination and state surveillance targeting Muslim communities, and using the international human rights framework as a tool for liberation.

== Awards and honors ==
Shahshahani is the recipient of the Shanara M. Gilbert Human Rights Award from the Society of American Law Teachers, the National Lawyers Guild Ernie Goodman Award, the Emory Law School Outstanding Leadership in the Public Interest Award, the Emory University MLK Jr. Community Service Award, the US Human Rights Network Human Rights Movement Builder Award, the American Immigration Lawyers Association Advocacy Award, the Fulton County Daily Report Distinguished Leader Award, and the University of Georgia School of Law Equal Justice Foundation Public Interest Practitioner Award, among several other recognitions.

She has also been recognized as an abolitionist by the Antiracist Research and Policy Center at American University & the Frederick Douglass Family Initiatives, and as one of Atlanta's 500 Most Powerful Leaders by Atlanta magazine. In 2016, she was chosen by the Mundo Hispanico newspaper as a Personaje Destacado del Año (Outstanding Person of the Year) for defending the rights of immigrants in Georgia. In 2017, she was chosen by Georgia Trend magazine as one of the 40 under 40 notable Georgians.

Shahshahani served as a Wasserstein Public Interest Fellow at Harvard Law School in the Fall of 2025. She also served as the Spring 2025 Daynard Public Interest Law Fellow at the Northeastern University School of Law.

== Public speaking ==
Shahshahani speaks frequently at law school and college campuses on topics ranging from movement lawyering to roots of forced migration, U.S. foreign policy, abolition of ICE prisons, and countering state surveillance and repression against Muslim communities, among others.

Shahshahani gave the keynote speech at the 30th anniversary of the Rebellious Lawyering Conference at Yale Law School in 2024. She also delivered keynote speeches at the 2025 Emory Law School International Law Symposium and at the Spring Student Symposium at Brooklyn Law School in 2024. She also gave the keynote address for Peace and Justice week at Earlham College in 2019.

== Bibliography ==
- "Colonialism Turned Inward: Importing U.S. Militarism into Local Police Departments". Dædalus. 2025 (co-authored with Sofía Verónica Montez).
- "The Colonial Order Prevails in Palestine: The Right to Self-Determination from a Third World Approach to International Law". Yale Journal of International Law. 2025 (co-authored with Tina Al-khersan).
- "Cop Cities in a Militarized World". No Cop City, No Cop World: Lessons from the Movement. 2025.
- "From Atlanta to Kashmir, States Weaponize Counterterrorism Frameworks to Target Social Justice Movements". NYU Review of Law & Social Change. 2025 (co-authored with Juilee Shivalkar).
- "Bridging the Accountability Gap: A Call to Action for Migrants Subjected to Abuse in U.S. Custody". UCLA Journal of International Law and Foreign Affairs. 2024 (co-authored with Sarah Paoletti).
- "Known Adversary”: The Targeting of the Immigrants’ Rights Movement in the Post-Trump Era". Emory Law Journal. 2023 (co-authored with Chiraayu Gosrani).
- "The International Criminal Court’s Arbitrary Exercise of Its Duties Under the Rome Statute to the Benefit of Western Global Supremacy". The Human Rights Brief. 2023 (co-authored with Sofia Veronica Montez).
- "Reparations Owed to the Survivors of the Global War on Terror". N.Y.U. Review of Law & Social Change. 2023 (co-authored with Divya Babbula).
- "From the Chinese Exclusion Act to the Muslim Ban: An Immigration System Built on Systemic Racism". Harvard Law & Policy Review. 2023 (co-authored with Tina Al-khersan).
- "Deploying International Law to Combat Forced Labor in Immigration Detention Centers". Georgetown Immigration Law Journal. 2022 (co-authored with Kyleen Burke).
- "Movement Lawyering: A Case Study in the U.S. South". Howard Human & Civil Rights Law Review. 2020.
- "Decolonizing Justice in Tunisia: From Transitional Justice to a People's Tribunal". Monthly Review. 2019 (co-authored with Corinna Mullin and Nada Trigui).
- "From Pelican Bay to Palestine: The Legal Normalization of Force-Feeding Hunger-Strikers". Michigan Journal of Race & Law. 2019 (co-authored with Priya Arvind Patel).
- "Sanctuary Policies: Local Resistance in the Face of State Anti-Sanctuary Legislation". City University of New York Law Review. 2018 (co-authored with Amy Pont).
- "Local Police Entanglement with Immigration Enforcement in Georgia". Cardozo Law Review de•novo, 2017.
- "No Papers? You Can't Have Water: A Critique of Localities' Denial of Utilities to Undocumented Immigrants". Emory International Law Review, 2017 (co-authored with Kathryn Madison).
- "Indiscriminate Power: Racial Profiling and Surveillance Since 9/11". University of Pennsylvania Journal of Law and Social Change, 2015 (co-authored with Carlos Torres and Tye Tavaras).
- Immigration and Racial Profiling. Cultural Issues in Criminal Defense. 3rd & 4th editions, August 2010 and June 2015. ISBN 978-1-57823-440-0
- "Challenging the Practice of Solitary Confinement in Immigration Detention in Georgia and Beyond". City University of New York Law Review, 2014 (co-authored with Natasha El-Sergany).
- "Shattered Dreams: An Analysis of the Georgia Board of Regents' Admissions Ban from a Constitutional and International Human Rights Perspective". Hastings Race and Poverty Law Journal, 2013 (co-authored with Chaka Washington).
- "The legacy of US intervention and the Tunisian revolution: promises and challenges one year on". Interface. 4 (1): 67-101, May 2012 (co-authored with Corinna Mullin).
- "Reflections on the Occasion of the Tenth Anniversary of September 11". Race/Ethnicity: Multidisciplinary Global Contexts. 4 (3) 2011. doi:10.2979/racethmulglocon.4.3.449
- "Reflections". Shifting Balance Sheets: Women's Stories of Naturalized Citizenship & Cultural Attachment. July 1, 2011. ISBN 978-0982726235
