= Pou Sheng International =

Sportswear Retailer in China

Pou Sheng International (Holdings) Limited 寶勝國際(控股)有限公司
- Company type: Listed company
- Industry: Retailing
- Founded: 1992
- Headquarters: Hong Kong, China
- Area served: China
- Key people: Chairman: Wu Pan-Tsu
- Products: Sportswear
- Parent: Yue Yuen Industrial Holdings
- Website: www.pousheng.com

Pou Sheng International (Holdings) Limited (Chinese: 寶勝國際(控股)有限公司) (SEHK: 3813), or Pou Sheng International, is a sportswear retailer in mainland China under the brand of YYsports. In 2008, Pou Sheng International was spun off from its parent company, Yue Yuen Industrial Holdings (SEHK: 551), and listed on the Hong Kong Stock Exchange with its IPO price of HK$2.93 per share. Its brand portfolio of footwear as Nike, Adidas, SKECHERS, PUMA, Converse, etc.

== See also ==
- Pou Chen Corporation
- Yue Yuen Industrial Holdings
