= Jill Fisch =

American law professor

Jill E. Fisch
- Occupation: Law professor
- Title: Saul A. Fox Distinguished Professor of Business Law; Co-Director of the Institute for Law & Economics in the Department of Legal Studies and Business Ethics at the Wharton School of the University of Pennsylvania
- Awards: Robert A. Gorman Award for Excellence in Teaching (2010-2011); LLM Prize for Excellence in Teaching (2015-2016)

Academic background
- Education: Cornell University (B.A. 1982); Yale Law School (J.D. 1985)

Academic work
- Institutions: University of Pennsylvania Law School

Jill E. Fisch is the Saul A. Fox Distinguished Professor of Business Law at the University of Pennsylvania Law School, and Co-Director of the Institute for Law & Economics in the Department of Legal Studies and Business Ethics at the Wharton School of the University of Pennsylvania.

== Biography ==
Fisch attended Cornell University (B.A. 1982) and Yale Law School (J.D. 1985).

Fisch is the Saul A. Fox Distinguished Professor of Business Law at the University of Pennsylvania Law School, and Co-Director, of the Institute for Law & Economics in the Department of Legal Studies and Business Ethics at the Wharton School of the University of Pennsylvania. Earlier in her career she held the Fordham University School of Law T.J. Maloney Chair in Business Law, and was the Founding Director of the Fordham Corporate Law Center.

Among the many articles she has written are "Governance by Contract: The Implications for Corporate Bylaws," 106 Cal. L. Rev. 373 (2018), "Constructive Ambiguity and Judicial Development of Insider Trading," 71 SMU L. Rev. 749 (2018), "Leave it to Delaware: Why Congress Should Stay out of Corporate Governance," 2011 Francis G. Pileggi Distinguished Lecture in Law, 37 Del. J. Corp. L. 731 (2013), and "On Beyond CalPERS: Survey Evidence on the Developing Role of Public Pension Funds in Corporate Governance," 61 Vand. L. Rev. 315 (2008) (with Stephen J. Choi).

Fisch received the Robert A. Gorman Award for Excellence in Teaching (2010-2011), and the LLM Prize for Excellence in Teaching (2015-2016).
