= Bangladesh–Taiwan relations =

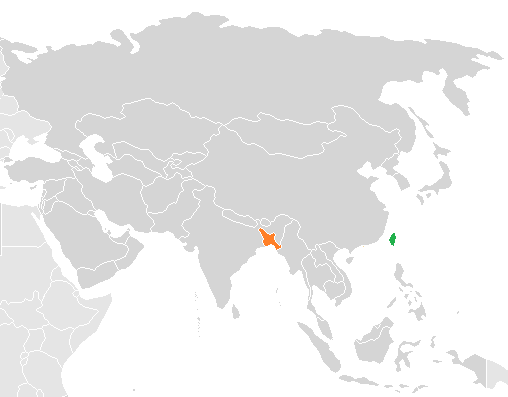

- Taiwan: Bangladesh

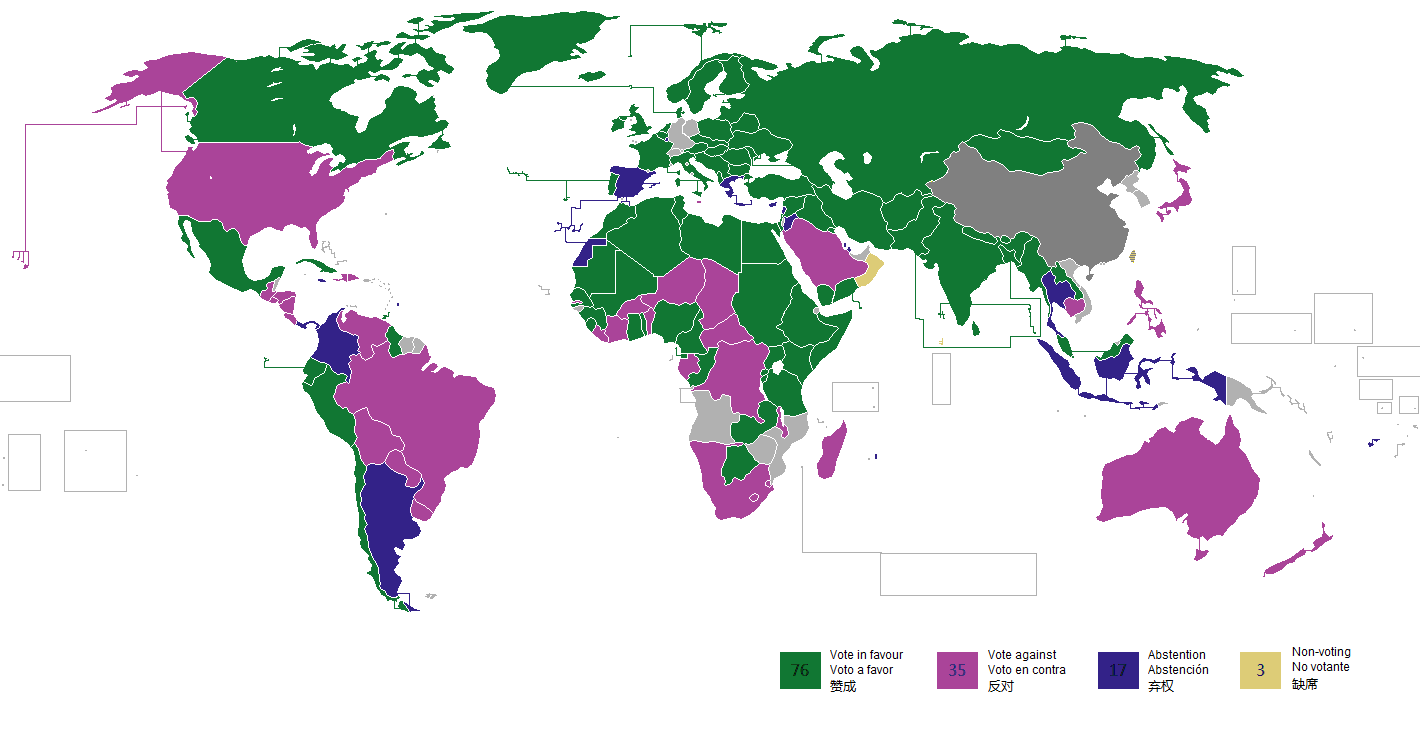
Bangladesh agreed the replacement in UN-2758

Bangladesh–Taiwan relations refer to international relations between Republic of China (Taiwan) and Bangladesh. Taiwan and Bangladesh do not have official relations.

== History ==
On 4 October 1975, Bangladesh recognized the People's Republic of China and ended diplomatic relations with Taiwan. In United Nations General Assembly Resolution 2758 Bangladesh supported the replacement of ROC by the PRC.

In 2004, the Taiwan government established the Taipei Economic and Cultural Office in Bangladesh in, the capital Dhaka, but due to the Bangladesh government's obstruction, it was unable to offer visa services, leading to its closure on 30 June 2009. Since the office's closure, Bangladesh affairs have been jointly handled by the Taipei Economic and Cultural Center in India in New Delhi and the Taipei Economic and Cultural Office in Thailand in Bangkok.

== Visa policy ==
Under the visa policy of Bangladesh, Taiwan citizens with Republic of China Passport can be issued visas on arrival, but under the visa policy of Taiwan, Bangladesh citizens now have to obtain visas in New Delhi or Bangkok.

== Economic relations ==
The main export products from Taiwan to Bangladesh are petroleum, stain steel, synthetic fiber, vinyl chloride, polyacetal, epoxy, cloth and sewing machines. Bangladeshi exports to Taiwan are crabs, shrimps, copper, clothing and shoes.

There are over 40 Taiwanese companies investing in Bangladesh, the largest categories are clothing manufacture, shoe manufacture, aquaculture, furniture manufacture. Companies of shoe manufacture are mostly in Chittagong, and others are in the suburban side of Dhaka.

The biggest Taiwanese investor in Bangladesh is Run Xing Textile Company (潤興紡織), and the second is Pou Chen Corporation, which makes running shoes for Nike, Adidas and Puma. After wages increased in China and 2014 Vietnam anti-China protests, many of Taiwanese companies have decided to move their factories to Bangladesh for lower payment and stable environment.
