= Rudofsky =

Rudofsky is a surname. Notable people with the surname include:

- Lee Rudofsky (born 1979), American judge
- Bernard Rudofsky (1905–1988), Austrian-American writer, architect, collector, teacher, designer, and social historian

== See also ==
- David Rudovsky
