= Matthew Adler =

American lawyer (born 1962)

Matthew D. Adler
- Born: 1962 (age 63–64)
- Occupation: Law professor
- Title: Richard A. Horvitz Professor of Law and Professor of Economics, Philosophy and Public Policy
- Awards: Marshall Scholar; Christian R. and Mary F. Lindback Foundation Award for Distinguished Teaching

Academic background
- Education: Yale University (BA, JD)

Academic work
- Institutions: Duke Law School; University of Pennsylvania Law School

Matthew D. Adler (born 1962) is the Richard A. Horvitz Professor of Law and Professor of Economics, Philosophy and Public Policy at Duke Law School, and is the founding director of the Duke Center for Law, Economics and Public Policy. Earlier in his career, Adler was the Leon Meltzer Professor of Law at the University of Pennsylvania Law School.

== Biography ==
Adler earned a B.A. (1984) and J.D. (1991) from Yale University and Yale Law School, where he was a member of the Yale Law Journal. In 1984 he was a Marshall Scholar. He earned an M. Litt. in modern history in 1987 from St. Antony’s College at Oxford University, where he was a Marshall Scholar. He clerked for Judge Harry T. Edwards of the U.S. Court of Appeals for the D.C. Circuit in 1991-92 and for U.S. Supreme Court Justice Sandra Day O’Connor in 1992-93. Adler then practiced law at Paul, Weiss, Rifkind, Wharton & Garrison in New York City in 1994.

Adler was the Leon Meltzer Professor of Law at the University of Pennsylvania Law School, where he taught from 1995 to 2012. In 2001 and 2006 he won the Harvey Levin Memorial Award for Teaching Excellence at the University of Pennsylvania Law School, in 2007 he won the Christian R. and Mary F. Lindback Foundation Award for Distinguished Teaching, and in 2010 he won the A. Leo Levin Award for Excellence in an Introductory Course at the University of Pennsylvania Law School.

He is the Richard A. Horvitz Professor of Law and Professor of Economics, Philosophy and Public Policy at Duke University, and is the founding director of the Duke Center for Law, Economics and Public Policy.

Among his writings are The Oxford Handbook of Well-Being and Public Policy (Oxford University Press, 2016) (co-edited with Marc Fleurbaey), Well-Being and Fair Distribution: Beyond Cost-Benefit Analysis (Oxford University Press, 2012), and The Rule of Recognition and the U.S. Constitution (Oxford University Press, 2009) (co-edited with Kenneth Himma). He is an editor of Economics and Philosophy. In 2018 he was one of the top five cited professors from Duke Law School.
