= Yue Yuen Industrial Holdings =

Taiwanese footwear company

Yue Yuen Industrial (Holdings) Limited 裕元工業(集團
- Company type: Public Listed company
- Traded as: SEHK: 551
- Industry: Athletic and casual/outdoor footwear manufacturer
- Founded: 1988
- Headquarters: Hong Kong
- Area served: Worldwide
- Key people: Chairman: Mr. Lu Chin Chu
- Parent: Pou Chen Corporation
- Subsidiaries: Pou Sheng International
- Website: Yue Yuen Industrial Holdings Limited

Yue Yuen Industrial (Holdings) Limited is a Taiwanese footwear manufacturer headquartered in Hong Kong and established by its Taiwanese parent company, Pou Chen Group. It is the largest branded athletic and casual footwear manufacturer in the world. It is an original equipment manufacturer (OEM) and original design manufacturer (ODM) for major international brand name companies such as Nike, Crocs, Adidas, Reebok, Asics, New Balance, Puma, Timberland and Rockport.

In 1988, the company set up its first production line in China. It was one of the Hang Seng Index Constituent Stocks (bluechip) in the Hong Kong Stock Exchange. But after 8 June 2009, it was removed from blue chip.

In April 2014 40,000 workers were protesting the company's failure to pay the full social security and house renting contribution. The protests were triggered by a staff member who worked for 18 years at Yue Yuen did not get her full pension. The company did not pay 250 yuan per month to the employee that they should have. All companies are supposed under Chinese law to pay full mandatory social insurance for workers – including pensions, medical insurance, housing allowances and injury compensation.

In 2019, the Huffington Post claimed "Yue Yuen, the Foxconn of footwear, makes one-fifth of all the shoes in the world."
