= Puerto Rican Workers' Central =

Trade union center in Puerto Rico

CPT
- Puerto Rican Workers' Central
- Central Puertorriqueña de Trabajadores
- Founded: 21 March 1986
- Headquarters: Calle Cádiz 1214; Urb. Puerto Nuevo; San Juan, PR 00920
- Location: Puerto Rico
- Key people: Emilio Nieves Torres, President

The Puerto Rican Workers' Central (Spanish: Central Puertorriqueña de Trabajadores, CPT) is a trade union center in Puerto Rico. It is one of the most important non-US-aligned unions in the territory.

== History ==
In 2010, CPT led a successful picket line at a government center in the barrio of Munillas, prohibiting work from taking place.

In 2017, CPT expressed solidarity with workers at the University of Puerto Rico, who were protesting against massive budget cuts.

CPT is opposed to the PROMESA law and the austerity measures imposed by its Fiscal Control Board.

== Affiliates ==
- Independent Authentic Union of Aqueduct and Sewerage Authority Employees (UIA AAA)
- Independent Brotherhood of Telephone Employees (HIETEL)
- Independent Union of Telephone Employees (UIET Unida)
- Others
