= Lindback Award =

American education award

The Christian R. and Mary F. Lindback Award is given out by the Christian R. and Mary F. Lindback Foundation.

== History ==
Christian Lindback was the president and owner of Abbotts Dairies. He was also a trustee of Bucknell University. His foundation established the Lindback Awards, for distinguished teaching at colleges and universities in New Jersey, Pennsylvania, Maryland, Delaware, and Virginia. The award includes an honorarium and a medallion.

== Notable recipients ==
- Matthew Adler (born 1962), Richard A. Horvitz Professor of Law at Duke University School of Law.
- Norman Adler (1941–2016), professor of behavioral neurobiology and evolutionary psychology
- Nina Auerbach (1943–2017), John Welsh Centennial Professor of English Emerita at the University of Pennsylvania
- Michelle Francl, Professor of Chemistry, Bryn Mawr College, and Adjunct Scholar, Vatican Observatory
- Henry Gleitman (1925–2015), professor emeritus of Psychology at the University of Pennsylvania
- Robert A. Gorman (born 1937), Professor of Law at the University of Pennsylvania Law School
- Margaret Hastings (1910–1970), historian of Medieval English legal history
- Vijay Kumar (born 1962), roboticist and professor in the School of Engineering & Applied Science at the University of Pennsylvania
- Zack Ives (born 1972), computer scientist and professor in the School of Engineering & Applied Science at the University of Pennsylvania
- Helen Kwalwasser (1927–2017), professor emeritus of violin at Temple University
- Corinne Hogden Robinson (1909–2005), Head of the Food and Nutrition Department at Drexel University
- Amy Wax (born 1953), the Robert Mundheim Professor of Law at the University of Pennsylvania Law School
- George E. Atwood (born 1944), psychotherapist, psychoanalytic theorist, and emeritus Professor of Psychology at Rutgers University
