= Corinne Hogden Robinson =

American scientist

- Corinne G. Hogden (later Robinson), from the 1931 yearbook of the University of Wisconsin
- Born: Corinne Georgina Högden; February 21, 1909; Trempealeau County, Wisconsin
- Died: January 11, 2005 (aged 95); Newtown Square, Pennsylvania
- Education: University of Wisconsin–Madison; University of Cincinnati
- Occupations: Scientist, college professor

Corinne Georgina Hogden Robinson (February 21, 1909 – January 11, 2005) was an American scientist specializing in research on nutrition and blood analysis. She was head of the Department of Food and Nutrition at Drexel University from 1953 to 1969, and she was the author of several successful textbooks in her field.

== Early life and education ==
Corinne Hogden was born in Trempealeau County, Wisconsin, the daughter of Albert Julius Hogden and Nora Amanda Onsrud Hogden. Both of her parents were born in Wisconsin; three of her grandparents were immigrants from Norway. Her father was a carpenter. Her brother Allen worked for the United States State Department in Germany after World War II, and was an administrator at the New York Public Library.

On Wednesday, August 30, 1922, Corinne Georgina Hogden of Ettrick represented Trempealeau County in the 1922 Wisconsin State Spelling Bee staged at the Wisconsin State Fair in West Allis, where she won that year's state spelling title. She was unable to advance to the national competition as that did not begin until 1925.

In 1926, Hogden won $1000 as Wisconsin's female finalist in a national leadership contest sponsored by 4-H. She attended Gale College, where she was described as "the ranking scholar of the school" in 1925. She graduated from the University of Wisconsin–Madison in 1930, and completed a master's degree at the University of Cincinnati in 1934, with a thesis titled "Protein Metabolism in Nephrosis" (1933). In 1976, she was awarded a doctor of science degree by Drexel University.

== Career ==
Hogden supervised dietary services at Columbia Presbyterian Hospital, and taught in the nursing school at Columbia University, before she married in 1944. Beginning in 1953, she was head of the Department of Food and Nutrition at Drexel University; she also taught courses at Temple University's medical school. She was recognized for excellence in teaching in 1962, with the Lindback Award. She retired from Drexel in 1969.

Robinson served on the board for the journal of the American Dietetic Association, and was president of the Pennsylvania Dietetic Association. She wrote and revised two successful textbooks, Nutrition and Diet Therapy (1947) and Normal and Therapeutic Nutrition. She also lectured to community and professional groups on health topics.

== Publications ==
=== As Corinne Hogden ===
- "Metabolism of Adolescent Girls III. The Excretion of Creatinine and Creatine" (1936, with Chi Che Wang and Ida Genther)
- "The estimation of albumin and globulin in blood serum" (1937, with Howard W. Robinson and J. W. Price)
- "Metabolic study of five children with nephrotic syndrome" (1939, with Chi Che Wang and Ida Genther)
- "The biuret reaction in the determination of serum proteins" (1940, with H. W. Robinson)
- "The gravimetric determination of blood serum proteins" (1941, with H. W. Robinson)
- "The influence of serum proteins on the spectrophotometric absorption curve of phenol red in a phosphate buffer mixture" (1941, with H. W. Robinson)

=== As Corinne H. Robinson ===
- Nutrition and Diet Therapy (1947, with Fairfax T. Proudfit)
- Normal and Therapeutic Nutrition (1967, with Fairfax T. Proudfit and Marilyn R. Lawler)
- Basic Nutrition and Diet Therapy (1980)

== Personal life and legacy ==
Hogden married her colleague Howard West Robinson in 1944. They had a son, Glenn, who became a political scientist. She was council president of two Lutheran churches in the Philadelphia area. She died in 2005, at the age of 95, in Newtown Square, Pennsylvania. Her papers are in the Drexel University Archives, including an unpublished autobiography in three volumes.
