= Robert A. Gorman =

American law professor

- Born: April 22, 1937 (age 89); New York City, U.S.
- Occupation: Law professor
- Title: Kenneth W. Gemmill Professor Emeritus
- Awards: Lindback Award (1968)

Academic background
- Education: Harvard University (BA, LLB); University College, Oxford

Academic work
- Institutions: University of Pennsylvania Law School

Robert A. Gorman (born April 22, 1937) is an American law professor. He is a professor emeritus at the University of Pennsylvania Law School.

== Biography ==
Gorman was born in New York City. He obtained a B.A., summa cum laude, from Harvard College in 1958, an LL.B., magna cum laude, from Harvard Law School in 1962, where he was on the Harvard Law Review, and attended University College at Oxford University in 1958-59. He was a Law Clerk to Hon. Irving R. Kaufman of the United States Court of Appeals, Second Circuit in 1962-63, and an associate at Proskauer Rose Goetz & Mendelsohn in 1963-1964.

Gorman is the Kenneth W. Gemmill Professor Emeritus at the University of Pennsylvania Law School. He was the president of the American Association of University Professors from 1981 to 1982, and was president of the Association of American Law Schools in 1991.

Among his writings are Basic Text on Labor Law: Unionization and Collective Bargaining, West Publishing Co. (1976), 2d ed. (2004) (with Matthew W. Finkin), Labor Law Analysis and Advocacy (with Matthew W. Finkin), Juris Publishing Inc. (2013), and Cases and Materials on Labor Law (with Archibald Cox and Derek Bok), Foundation Press.

== Awards ==
Gorman was awarded a Fulbright Scholarship in 1958-59, an Honorary Woodrow Wilson Fellowship in 1958, the Lindback Award for Distinguished Teaching in 1968, the Pennsylvania Chapter of Order of the Coif Award for Distinguished Scholarship in 1980, the Distinguished Service Award of the University of Pennsylvania Law Alumni Society in 2000, and the Harvey Levin Award for Teaching Excellence at the University of Pennsylvania Law School in 2000.
