= Margaret Hastings =

American medievalist

- Born: May 23, 1910; Springfield, Massachusetts, U.S.
- Died: October 20, 1979 (aged 69); England
- Education: Mount Holyoke College (BA); Bryn Mawr College (MA, PhD)
- Occupation: Legal historian
- Awards: Lindback Award

Margaret Hastings (May 23, 1910 – October 20, 1979) was an American historian of Medieval English legal history.

== Life and work ==
Margaret Hastings was born in Springfield, Massachusetts, on May 23, 1910. She received her B.A. from Mount Holyoke College in 1931 and then took her master's degree and Ph.D. from Bryn Mawr College in 1932 and 1939 respectively. Hastings taught in private schools from 1935 to 1944 and was then a research analyst of the U.S. Army for the rest of the war. She became a lecturer in history at Douglass College, in New Brunswick, New Jersey, in 1946. The following year she wrote the seminal book, The Court of Common Pleas in Fifteenth Century England. Hastings was promoted to instructor later in 1946, assistant professor in 1949, associate professor in 1952 and professor of history in 1960. She was a contributor to Changing Views on British History in 1966 and wrote Medieval European Society five years later. Hastings was a Fellow of the Royal Historical Society and was the first Douglass College faculty member to receive a Lindback Award. She died in an automobile accident in England on October 20, 1979.
