= Arnt O. Rhea =

American politician (1852–1937)

Arnt O. Rhea (October 10, 1852 – May 25, 1937) was an American politician, businessman, and educator.

Born in Trondheim, Norway, Rhea emigrated with his parents in 1861 to Wisconsin and settled in La Crosse County, Wisconsin. Rhea went to La Crosse Business College, Gale College, River Falls Normal School, and Winona Normal School. He taught school in La Crosse County and elected La Crosse County Superintendent of Schools. In 1893, Rhea moved to Thorp, Wisconsin, where he served as principal and later was elected Clark County, Wisconsin Superintendent of Schools. He also owned a farm and was involved with the Gilman Manufacturing Company in Gilman, Wisconsin, Taylor County, Wisconsin. In 1913, Rhea served in the Wisconsin State Assembly and was a Republican. He died at his daughter's house in Wisconsin Dells, Wisconsin in 1937.
