= David L. Holcomb =

American politician

David L. Holcomb (1848–1913) was a member of the Wisconsin State Assembly.

== Biography ==
Holcomb was born on April 26, 1848, in what is now Greenbush, Wisconsin. He would attend what was then Galesville University. After residing in Floyd, Iowa, Holcomb settled in Arcadia, Wisconsin in 1867. Jobs he held include farm hand and schoolteacher. Holcomb married Ida Dewey in 1874. He died on September 30, 1913, and was interred in Arcadia.

== Political career ==
Holcomb was elected to the Assembly in 1892 and 1898. Additionally, he was President of the school board and Chairman (similar to Mayor) of Arcadia and a member of the county board of Trempealeau County, Wisconsin. He was a Republican.
