= Ida Genther Schmidt =

American scientist (1902–1999)

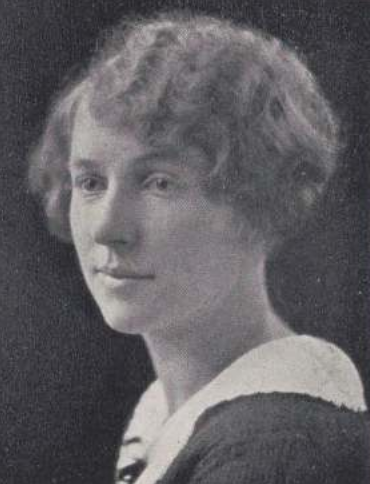
- Ida T. Genther, from the 1925 yearbook of Mount Holyoke College
- Born: Ida Therese Genther; December 1, 1902; Oradell, New Jersey, U.S.
- Died: October 10, 1999 (aged 96); Cincinnati, Ohio, U.S.
- Occupations: Scientist, biochemistry researcher

Ida Therese Genther Schmidt (December 1, 1902 – October 10, 1999) was an American anatomist and biochemistry researcher, working in endocrinology and especially on the effects of radiation. She was on the faculty of the University of Cincinnati's medical school for 33 years, beginning in the 1930s. She co-authored research papers with Leo Loeb, Marie Agnes Hinrichs, and Chi Che Wang.

== Early life and education ==
Genther was born in Oradell, New Jersey, the daughter of Gustave Genther and Louisa Baer Genther. Her parents were German immigrants; she worked as a domestic servant in her childhood. A teacher helped her continue her studies, and arranged a college scholarship for the young Genther. She graduated from Mount Holyoke College in 1925, as a zoology major with a chemistry minor. She earned a master's degree at the University of Wisconsin–Madison in 1927, and completed a Ph.D. at Washington University in St. Louis in 1930.

== Career ==
She taught zoology at Washington University in St. Louis, and physiology at University of Chicago. She was an assistant professor of anatomy at the University of Cincinnati College of Medicine, where she was one of the first female professors, and taught from 1930 to 1963. From 1963 to 1969, she taught in the veterinary college at the University of California, Davis, and from 1969 to 1982 she taught in the medical school at the University of Alabama at Birmingham.

Schmidt was a member of the Cincinnati Children's Hospital Pediatric Research Foundation. She had research residencies at the Marine Biological Laboratory at Woods Hole during the 1930s. She was editor of the textbook An Atlas of Human Histology for twenty years, working with fellow editor Mariano S. H. di Fiore.

== Publications ==
Genther Schmidt's research appeared in academic journals including Experimental Biology and Medicine, The Anatomical Record, Physiological Zoology, American Journal of Anatomy, American Journal of Diseases of Children, and Endocrinology.

=== As Ida T. Genther ===
- "Heredity and Internal Secretion on Origin of Mammary Cancer in Mice" (1928, with Leo Loeb)
- "Effect of Certain Alkaloids Upon Early Cleavage in Arbacia Punctulata" (1929, with Marie A. Hinrichs)
- "Rate of Heart-Beat in Limulus as Affected by Exposure to Ultraviolet Point Radiation" (1930, with Marie A. Hinrichs)
- "Ultra-Violet Radiation and the Production of Twins and Double Monsters" (1931, with Marie A. Hinrichs)
- "Irradiation of the ovaries of guinea-pigs and its effect on the oestrous cycle" (1931)
- "X-irradiation of the ovaries of guinea-pigs and its effect on subsequent pregnancies" (1934)
- "Metabolism of Adolescent Girls III: The Excretion of Creatinine and Creatine" (1936, with Chi Che Wang and Corinne Hogden)
- "Metabolic Study of Five Children with Nephrotic Syndrome" (1939, with Chi Che Wang and Corinne Hogden)

=== As Ida G. Schmidt ===
- "The excretion of theelin in the urine of guinea pigs with irradiated ovaries" *(1936)
- "The effects of hypophyseal implants from normal mature guinea pigs on the sex organs of immature guinea pigs" (1937)
- "Variations in the Structure of Adrenals and Thyroids Produced by Thyroxine and High Environmental Temperatures" (1938, with L. H. Schmidt)
- "The influence of a normal ovary on the formation of typical irradiation tissues in the X-rayed ovary" (1938)
- "The Relation of Environmental Temperature to the Action of Thyroxine" (1938, with L. H. Schmidt)
- "Changes in the Genital Tracts of Guinea Pigs Associated with Cystic and 'Interstitial Gland' Ovaries of Long Duration" (1939)
- An Atlas of Human Histology (1967, edited with Mariano S. H. di Fiore)

== Personal life ==
Genther married her colleague Leon Herbert Schmidt in 1931. They had two children, Nancy and Richard. Her husband died in 1989, and she died in 1999, at the age of 96, at a nursing home in Cincinnati.

Microbiologist Clara Sesler Genther was Ida Genther Schmidt's sister-in-law. Both women worked medical research in Cincinnati, and both women published research with L. H. Schmidt.
