= Gale College =

- Gale College Historic District
- U.S. National Register of Historic Places
- U.S. Historic district
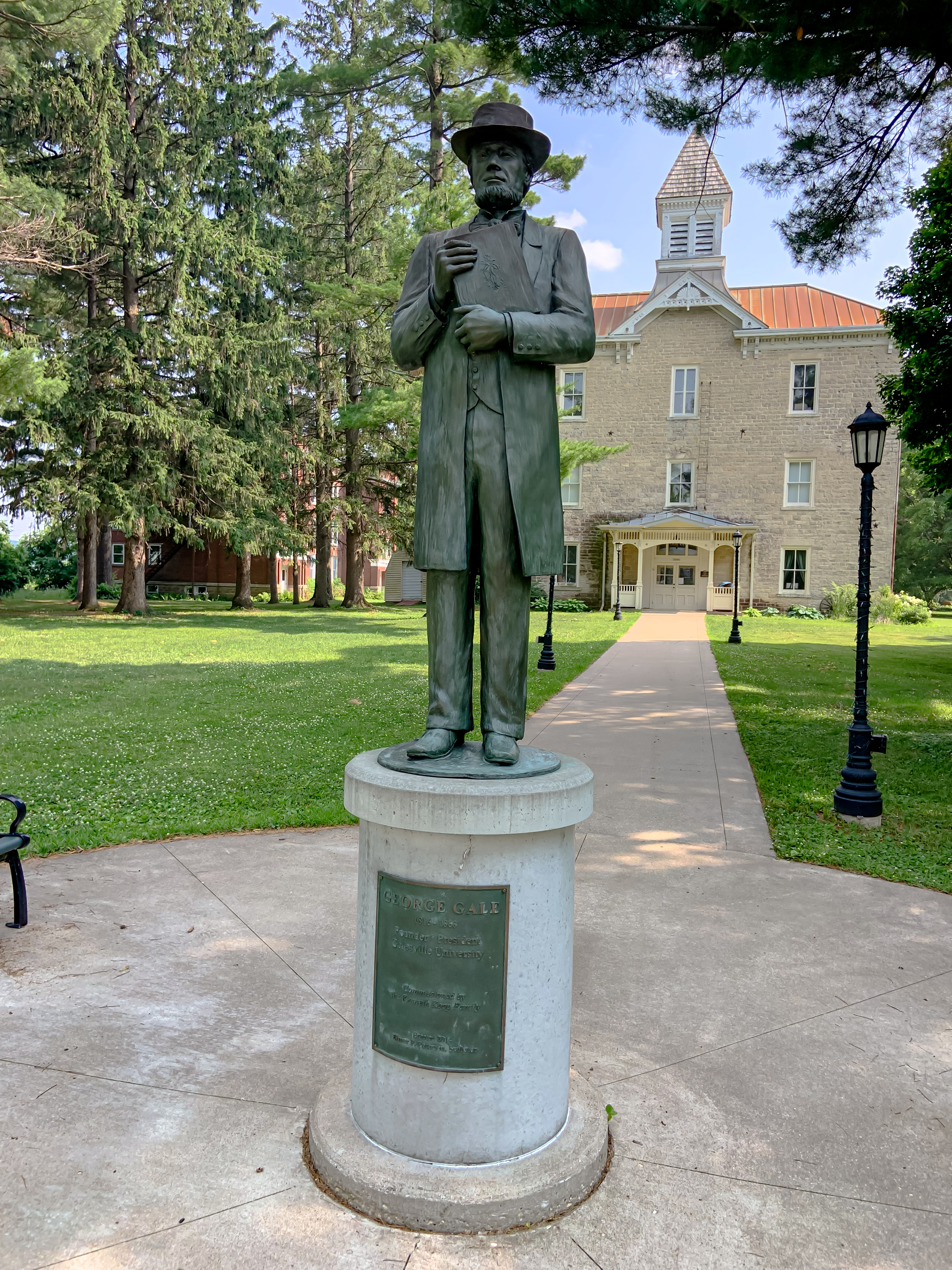
- Old Main Hall in 2023

- Location within Wisconsin Location within the United States
- Location: Twelfth Street, Galesville, Wisconsin
- Coordinates: 44°4′43″N 91°22′2″W
- Area: 2 acres (0.81 ha)
- Architectural style: Italianate
- MPS: Galesville MRA
- NRHP reference No.: 84004020
- Added to NRHP: February 14, 1997

Gale College (also Galesville University and Marynook) was a private college in Galesville, Wisconsin. It was founded by George Gale, opening in 1854 and closing in 1939. Several religious denominations used the facilities as a college and later as a training school.

== History ==
Judge George Gale went to college at the University of Vermont and moved to the western frontier in La Crosse, Wisconsin, in the early 1850s. After finding little interest in starting a college in La Crosse, he bought 2,000 acres (810 ha) to start Galesville at a choice spot for his planned university. The state of Wisconsin chartered the school in 1854 as Galesville University and Gale held the first classes in the county courthouse in Galesville. The first class had 16 students including Gale's son, George Gale Jr. Old Main was completed in 1862 and the campus was occupied in 1863. Gale ran the nonsectarian college until 1865 and the school floundered when his health deteriorated during his involvement in the American Civil War.

In 1865, the Methodist Episcopal Church took over the school and held classes until 1871. The Presbyterians took over until 1901 and changed the name to Gale College in the 1890s. The Synod of the Norwegian Evangelical Lutheran Church in America purchased the college in 1901. In 1915, they built a new dormitory and gymnasium. They constructed a new heating plant in 1921. The Lutherans suspended the school for the 1938-39 school year because of too small enrollment and closed it permanently in June 1939.

The Society of Mary, Province of St. Louis purchased the buildings and 20 acres (8.1 ha) of land in 1941 for $10,000. Its buildings included two dormitories, the main building, and a heating plant. The Catholic order used the buildings to train novitiate brothers and priests. They named the school Marynook and operated the novitiate until it became a retreat in 1973. The retreat operated until June 1994, at which time the city of Galesville purchased it for $150,000. The city granted a 50-year lease in 2000 to the Garden of Eden Preservation Society.

=== Founder's Day ===
Throughout the school's varied history, it held a "Founders Day" celebration on June 4. A wreath was usually placed at Gale's tomb and the grounds were typically open to the public. The day celebrated Gale's founding of the school, his platting of Galesville, and his work to develop Trempealeau County.

=== Historic Place ===
Several buildings on the campus were listed as a historic district with the National Register of Historic Places on February 14, 1997.

== Current use ==
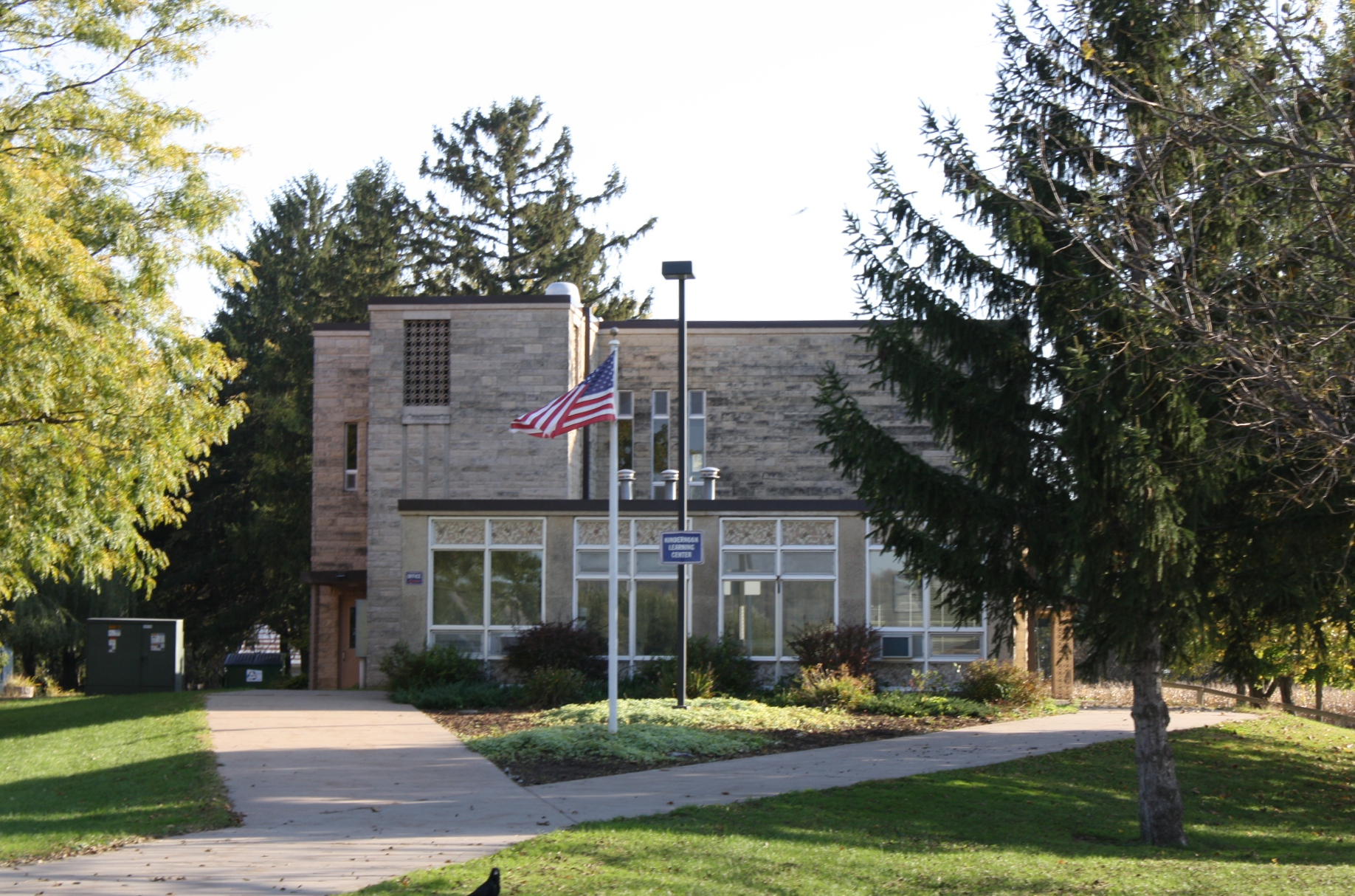
Kindergarten

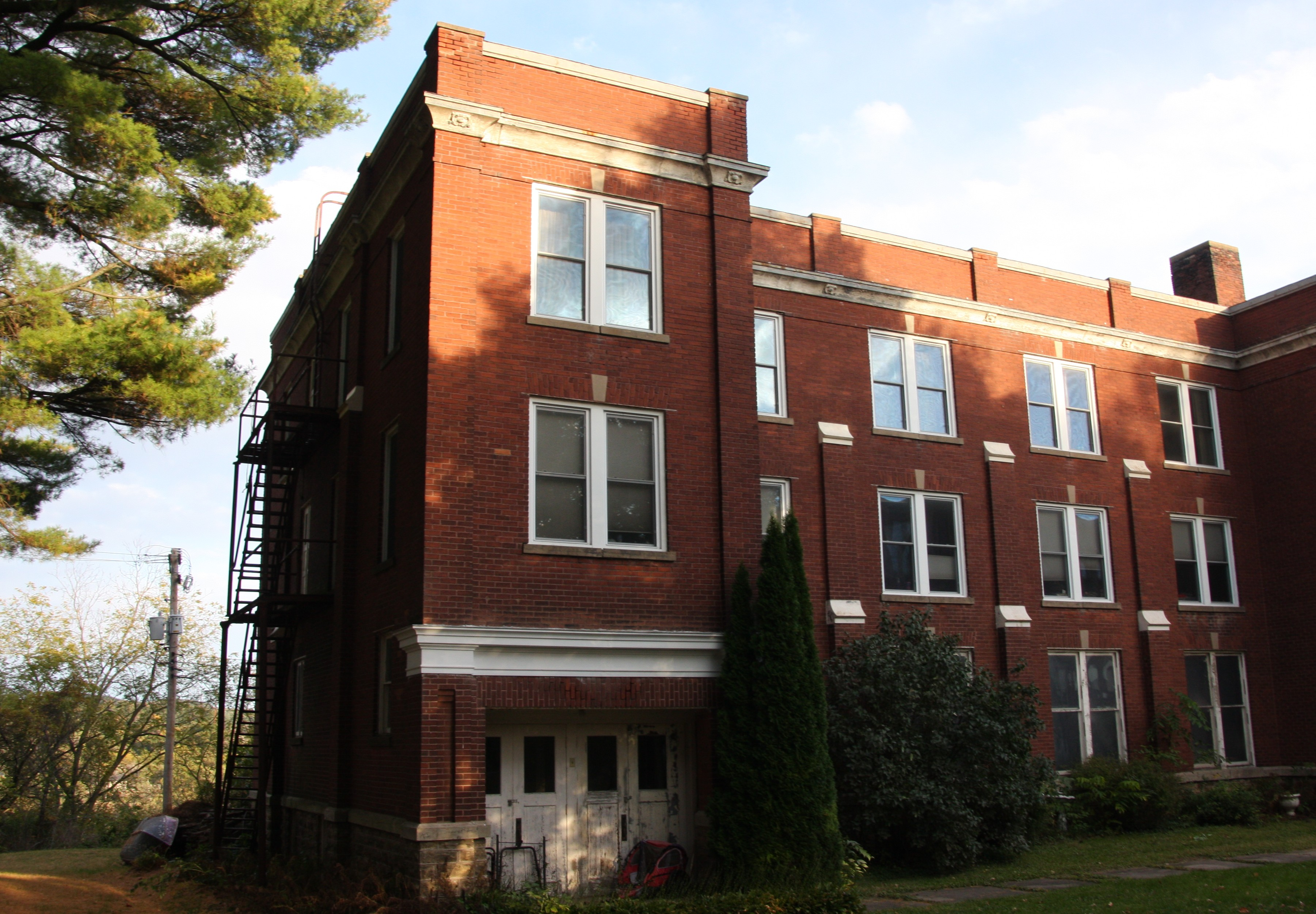
Red brick building

The Old Main building is being restored by the Old Main Historical & Community Arts Center. The group rents out the building for events and holds fundraisers. Volunteers are compiling the history of the area, building a digital database, and collecting local genealogy information. Another building is being used as a kindergarten.

== Notable alumni ==
- Marcellus Dorwin, politician
- John Hamman, Marianist Brother, magician
- Charles N. Herreid, politician, Governor of South Dakota
- Corinne Hogden Robinson, nutritionist
- David L. Holcomb, politician
- Merlin Hull, politician
- John Ballard Rendall, educator and politician
- Arnt O. Rhea, politician and educator
- Elmore Y. Sarles, Governor of North Dakota
- Hobart Stocking, politician
- Albert Twesme, politician and jurist

== Gallery ==
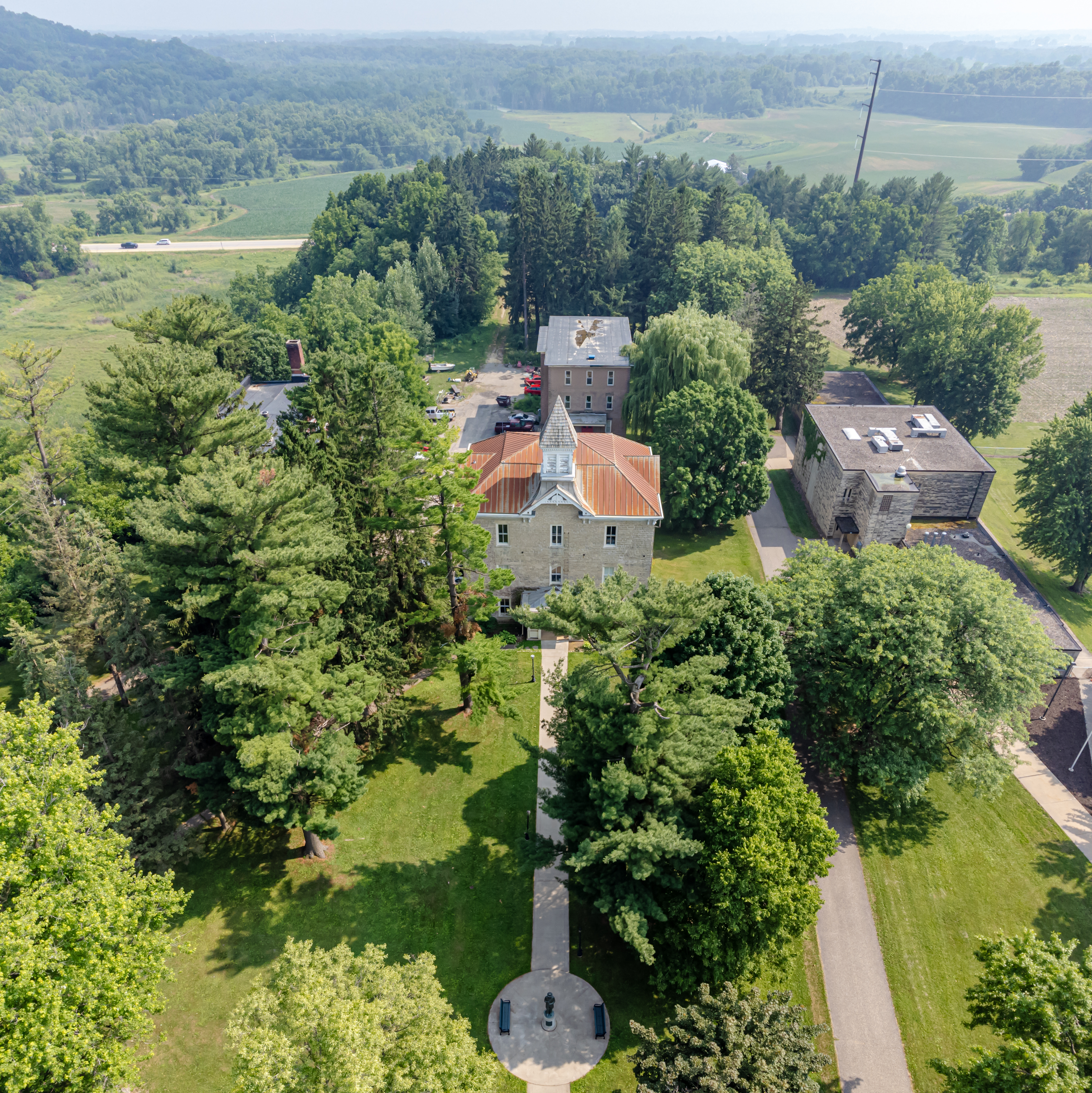
Gale College aerial photo

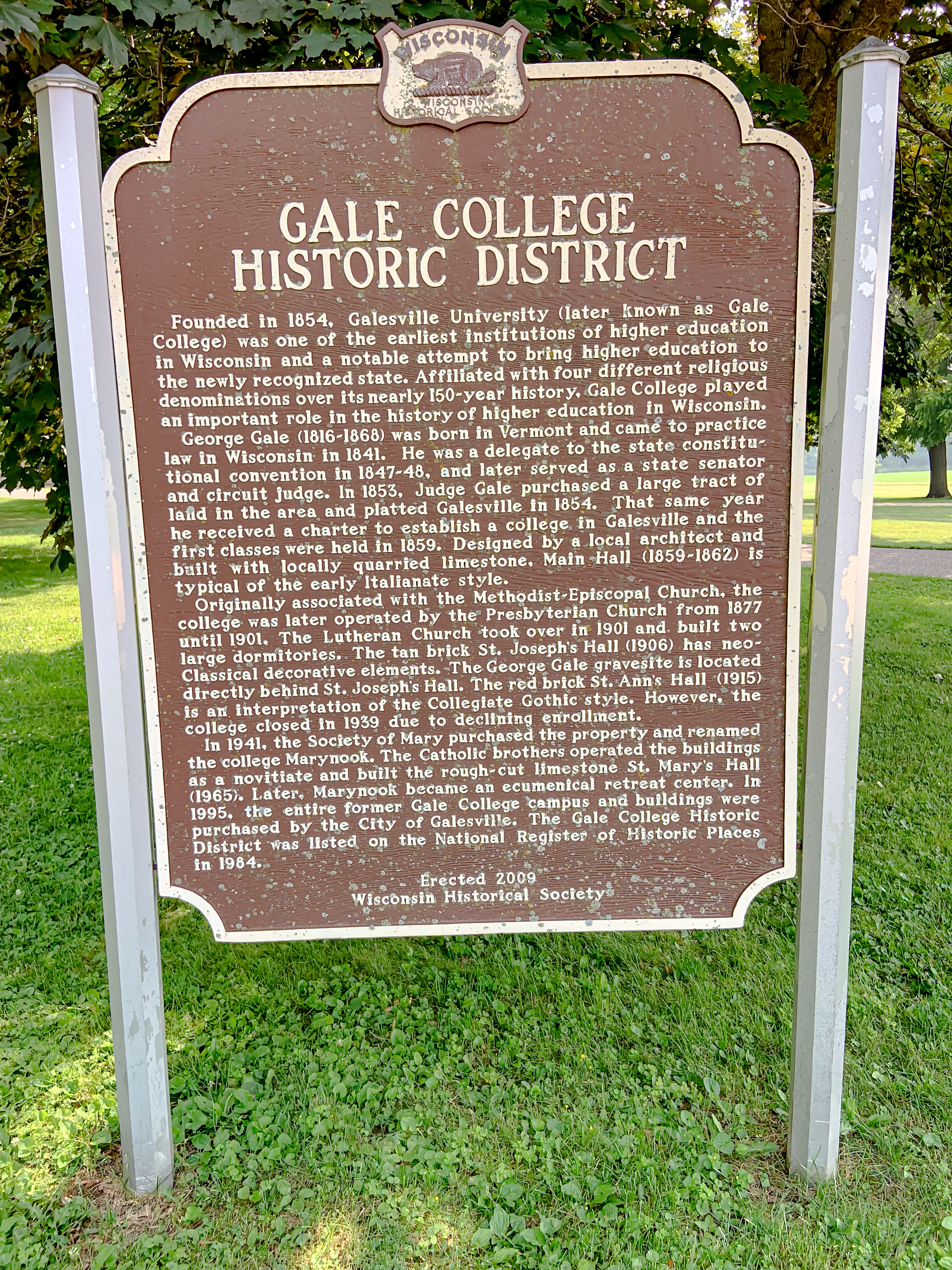
Gale College sign
