= Arthur Gonzalez =

American judge

Arthur J. Gonzalez
- Born: Brooklyn, NY
- Occupation: Professor of Law

Arthur J. Gonzalez is a senior fellow at New York University School of Law. Until August 2025, he was also member of the PROMESA oversight board in charge of resolving the Puerto Rican government-debt crisis. Before his retirement from the bench, he was chief judge of the United States Bankruptcy Court for the Southern District of New York.

Gonzalez received his undergraduate degree from Fordham University in 1969. Following graduation, he worked as a New York City public school teacher until 1982, earning a master's degree from the Brooklyn College School of Education. After earning a law degree in the Evening Program at Fordham in 1982, Gonzalez became an attorney for the Manhattan District Counsel Office of the Internal Revenue Service (IRS). He left the IRS in 1988 and worked as a private lawyer for several firms. During this period, he earned a Master of Laws from New York University (NYU). In 1991, Gonzalez re-entered government to become an Assistant United States Trustee for the Southern District of New York. He was promoted in 1993 to become trustee for New York, Connecticut, and Vermont. Judge Gonzalez was appointed bankruptcy judge in 1995.

== Significant cases ==
Gonzalez handled the Chrysler LLC bankruptcy case until his retirement. Previously, Gonzalez presided over the bankruptcy proceedings for WorldCom, at that point the largest U.S. bankruptcy case (since overtaken by the collapse of Lehman Brothers in 2008), and Enron. The criminal proceedings against the corporate executives of WorldCom and Enron did not originate from the bankruptcy proceedings before Gonzalez via mandatory referral of possible crimes under Title 18 U.S.C. § 3057; in contrast the post petition corporate entities both sought releases and compensation for the benefit of their current and former senior officers.
