= Leo Katz (lawyer) =

American legal scholar

- Title: Frank Carano Professor of Law

Academic background
- Education: University of Chicago (BA, MA, JD)

Academic work
- Institutions: University of Michigan; University of Pennsylvania

Leo Katz is an American lawyer and the Frank Carano Professor of Law at the University of Pennsylvania Law School.

== Biography ==
Katz is the son of the historian Friedrich Katz and Jana Badian Katz. Katz earned his B.A. from the University of Chicago in 1979. He earned both a master's degree in economics from the University of Chicago and a J.D. from the University of Chicago Law School in 1982. He graduated with honors and earned the Order of the Coif.

He was a law clerk to Judge Anthony M. Kennedy on the United States Court of Appeals for the Ninth Circuit. He then joined Mayer, Brown and Platt as an associate.

In 1987, he joined the faculty of the University of Michigan Law School. Four years later, he joined the faculty of Penn Law as a professor, and in 2004 was named the Frank Carano Professor of Law.

Katz's work focuses on criminal law, and his explorations of the paradoxes of criminal law and deontological theory help facilitate a deeper understanding of philosophical and legal issues. For example, by investigating crimes of coercion and deception, economic crimes like tax evasion, and crimes without apparent victims, he tries to shed light more generally on problems of consent, the use and abuse of legal stratagems, and the nature of harm throughout the law.

Katz was awarded a Guggenheim fellowship for his on-going book project, The Perverse Logic of Law and Morality. Katz has also authored numerous articles for law journals, as well as for the New York Times, Wall Street Journal, National Law Journal, and The American Lawyer. He has two daughters.

== Books ==
- Why the Law Is So Perverse (2011)
- Foundations of the Criminal Law, ed., with Michael Moore and Stephen Morse (1999)
- Ill-gotten Gains: Evasion, Blackmail, Fraud and Kindred Puzzles of the Law (1996)
- Bad Acts and Guilty Minds: Conundrums of the Criminal Law (1987)
