= Asian Law Review =

- Discipline: Law review
- Language: English

Publication details
- Former names: East Asia Law Review; Chinese Law & Policy Review
- History: 2004-present
- Publisher: University of Pennsylvania Law School East Asian Legal Studies Association (United States)
- Frequency: triannual

Standard abbreviations
- ISO 4: Asian Law Rev.

Indexing
- ISSN: 1943-8249

Links
- Journal homepage

The Asian Law Review is an academic journal focusing on legal issues concerning Asia, published by an organization of J.D. and LL.M. students at the University of Pennsylvania Law School. One or two issues are published in each volume, with an occasional additional issue reprinting papers from a symposium held by the Law Review.

== Mission statement ==
The Asian Law Review has the following mission statement:

The University of Pennsylvania Asian Law Review is committed to addressing legal developments in Asia by providing a forum for scholars and students to contribute to the development of legal affairs in the region. To further this end, we publish and distribute a leading journal and host a variety of events at Penn Law.

== History ==
The journal was founded as the Chinese Law & Policy Review, and published its first two volumes (for a total of three issues) under that title. It originally published articles both in English and in Mandarin Chinese. In 2008, it adopted the name East Asia Law Review, reflecting its intention to expand its focus from China to the greater East Asia region. It simultaneously became an English language only publication. The journal held its first symposium in 2009, titled "Repeating History? Lessons from the 1997 East Asia Financial Crisis and What they Mean Today."

In 2016 the journal was re-titled again to Asian Law Review. According to the journal's web page, the name changes are meant to reflect the "ever broader focus on the continent and its legal issues."

== Editor selection ==
The journal is managed by a board selected by its previous executives, and selects promising candidates from the law school's students as associate editors.
