= University of Pennsylvania Journal of Law and Social Change =

Official student-run journal of the University of Pennsylvania Law School

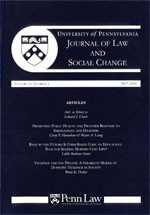
- Edition of JLASC
- Discipline: Law Journal
- Language: English

Publication details
- Former names: Journal of Law and Social Change, Hybrid: Journal of Law and Social Change at the University of Pennsylvania, Hybrid: The University of Pennsylvania Journal of Law and Social Change, Hybrid: A Journal of Law and Social Change
- History: 1993-present
- Publisher: University of Pennsylvania Law School (United States)
- Frequency: Quarterly

Standard abbreviations
- ISO 4: Univ. Pa. J. Law Soc. Change

Links
- Journal homepage

The University of Pennsylvania Journal of Law and Social Change (JLASC) is an official student-run journal of the University of Pennsylvania Law School.

== Overview ==
JLASC espouses an interdisciplinary scholarly approach dedicated to challenging social injustice. This broad mission attracts articles from a diverse range of legal scholars, practitioners and activists around the country. JLASC publishes three editions per year and is currently in its twenty-first volume.

== Article Selection Process ==
Among the six official journals of Penn Law, JLASC is unique both in its mission and its democratic article selection process. All journal members participate in decision-making by collectively reviewing, selecting and editing each piece of scholarship. Journal members read article submissions as part of a weekly, student-run seminar. Through debate and discussion, JLASC decides democratically which articles to publish. Articles embrace theory and practice, featuring scholarship that has practical implications both within and beyond the legal community.

== History ==
The journal was originally established in 1993 under the name HYBRID.
