= David Rudovsky =

American civil rights and criminal defense lawyer and scholar

David Rudovsky (born 1943) is an American civil rights and criminal defense lawyer. He was a founding partner, in 1971, of the law firm of Kairys & Rudovsky (later known as Kairys, Rudovsky, Messing, Feinberg and Lin). Rudovsky is a Senior Fellow at University of Pennsylvania Law School, where he teaches evidence and constitutional criminal procedure. In 1996, Rudovsky won Penn's Lindback Award for Teaching Excellence. In 1986 he was named a MacArthur Fellow by the John D. and Catherine T. MacArthur Foundation.

Rudovsky has twice appeared before the United States Supreme Court. He represented the plaintiff in Mitchell v. Forsyth, 472 U.S. 511 (1985), which addressed whether a government official could be sued for damages based on having authorized a warrantless wiretap for the purpose of gathering intelligence regarding a suspected threat to national security. The Supreme Court held that the official was immune from suit, regardless of the actual legality or illegality of the conduct, because his actions had not violated clearly established law. In addition, Rudovsky represented the plaintiff in City of Canton v. Harris, 489 U.S. 378 (1989), which addressed whether police could be sued for failing to provide medical treatment to an arrestee who had fallen down while in police custody and allegedly had suffered "emotional ailments" as a result. The Supreme Court held that the plaintiff had not proven "deliberate indifference" by the police to the plaintiff's medical condition, and therefore had not established that they were liable for damages.

In 2009, Rudovsky and his co-author, Widener University Law School Professor Leonard Sosnov (previously and subsequently an appellate public defender in Philadelphia), sued West Publishing Company over the company's issuance of a "2008-2009 pocket part" (update) to the authors' 1991 treatise on Pennsylvania criminal procedure. In prior years, the two authors had prepared annual supplements but for that year had not agreed on terms with the publisher, and so did not prepare one. When West issued a pocket part under Rudovsky and Sosnov's names anyway, which the authors considered grossly deficient, they brought suit. A jury ruled in favor of Rudovsky and Sosnov, awarding compensatory and punitive damages. Following a grant of remittitur, the case was settled on appeal on undisclosed terms.

== Works ==
- Michael Avery, Karen Blum and David Rudovsky, Police Misconduct: Law and Litigation (Clark Boardman Co., 2006, 3rd ed.).
- David Rudovsky, Alan Bronstein and Ed. Koren, The Rights of Prisoners (1990).
- Human Rights in Northern Ireland (Helsinki Watch, 1991, with Norman Dorsen and Lois Whitman).
- The Law of Arrest, Search and Seizure in Pennsylvania (PBR Press, 2005, 3rd ed.).
- “Running in Place: The Paradox of Expanding Rights and Restricted Remedies, “ 2005 Ill. L. Rev. 1199 (2005).
- David Rudovsky and Leonard Sosnov, Pennsylvania Criminal Procedure: Law, Commentary and Forms (West Group 2001, 2nd ed.).
- “Law Enforcement By Stereotypes and Serendipity: Racial Profiling and Searches Without Cause,” 3 U.Pa.J. of Const. Law 296 (2001).
- The Impact of the War on Drugs on Procedural Fairness and Racial Equality, 1994 Univ. of Chicago L. Forum 237 (1994).
- Police Abuse: Can The Violence Be Contained?, 27 Harvard Civil Rights - Civil Liberties L. Rev. 465 (1992).
- Crime, Law Enforcement, and Constitutional Rights, in A Less Than Perfect Union, Jules Lobel, ed. (1988).
- Criminal Justice: The Accused, in Our Endangered Rights, Norman Dorsen, ed. (1984).
- The Criminal Justice System and the Role of the Supreme court, The Politics of Law, David Kairys, ed. (Pantheon, 1990).
- John Gray and David Rudovsky, The Court Acknowledges the Illegitimate, 118 U. Pa. L. Rev. 1 (1969).
- The Right to Counsel Under Attack, 136 U. Pa. L. Rev. 1965 (1988).
- The Qualified Immunity Doctrine in the Supreme Court: Judicial Activism and the Restriction of Constitutional Rights, 138 U. Pa. L. Rev. 23 (1989).
- Norman Dorsen and David Rudovsky, Some Thoughts on Dissent, Personal Liberty and War, 54 ABA Journal 752 (1968).
- Book Review, Judicial First Aid, The Nation, August 17, 1977, p. 153.
- Litigating Prison Conditions in Philadelphia, 65 Prison Journal 64 (1985).
