= Matthew W. Finkin =

American legal scholar specializing in labor law, comparative law, and academic freedom

- Born: April 7, 1943
- Education: Ohio Wesleyan University (A.B.); New York University School of Law (LL.B.); Yale Law School (LL.M.)
- Occupation: Legal scholar
- Employer: University of Illinois College of Law (emeritus)
- Title: Albert J. Harno & Edward W. Cleary Professor of Law Emeritus

Matthew W. Finkin (born 7 April 1943) is an American legal scholar whose work has significantly shaped modern understandings of labor law, comparative labour law, and academic freedom. He is Professor of Law Emeritus at the University of Illinois College of Law, where he previously held the Swanlund Endowed Chair and the Albert J. Harno / Edward W. Cleary Chair.

== Early life and education ==
Finkin earned an A.B. from Ohio Wesleyan University before attending the New York University School of Law, where he completed an LL.B. He later received an LL.M. from Yale Law School.

== Career ==
Finkin began his teaching career at the Southern Methodist University Dedman School of Law. In 1988, he joined the University of Illinois College of Law, where he became one of the school's most prominent scholars.

From 1999 to 2013, he served as general editor of the international Comparative Labor Law & Policy Journal. He has held visiting appointments at leading universities, such as the University of Trier, the University of Athens, and the University of Padua, all of which awarded him honorary doctorates.

In 2025, the University of Illinois hosted a symposium honoring his contributions to academic freedom and campus speech.

== Scholarly work ==
Finkin's research bridges labor and employment law, comparative legal systems, and academic freedom theory. He frequently contrasts American labor regimes with European systems, especially German models.

=== Academic freedom ===
He is co-author, with Robert C. Post, of For the Common Good: Principles of American Academic Freedom, a work on the legal underpinnings of academic freedom in U.S. higher education.

He has also served as both general counsel and Chair of Committee A for the American Association of University Professors (AAUP), shaping important policy on tenure, governance, and extramural speech.

== Honors ==
- Alexander von Humboldt Foundation Research Prize
- Ordre des Palmes Académiques, Chevalier (France)
- Honorary doctorates: University of Trier, University of Athens, University of Padua
- Bob Hepple Award for lifetime achievement in labor law and industrial relations

== Selected works ==
- For the Common Good: Principles of American Academic Freedom (2009)
- Labor Law: Cases and Materials (16th ed., 2016)
- Research Handbook in Comparative Labour Law (2015) coedited with Guy Mundlak
- "Comparative Labour Law," in The Oxford Handbook of Comparative Law (2019)
