= Michigan Journal of International Law =

- Discipline: Law journal
- Language: English

Publication details
- History: 1979-present

Standard abbreviations
- Bluebook: Mich. J. Int'l L.
- ISO 4: Mich. J. Int. Law

Indexing
- ISSN: 2688-5522

Links
- Journal homepage

The Michigan Journal of International Law is a triannual academic journal in international law published by the University of Michigan Press and the University of Michigan Law School. Established in 1979, it publishes articles in all fields of international law. In a 2023 ranking of law journals based on a combination of the impact factor and citations, the Michigan Journal of International Law was ranked among the top international and comparative law journals. In a 2024 study, the Journal was ranked third out of all student-run international law journals in the United States.

== Abstracting and indexing ==
The journal is abstracted and indexed in WestLaw, LexisNexis, HeinOnline, and Law Review Commons, and articles are available at the University of Michigan Law School Scholarship Repository.
