= Puerto Rico Oversight, Management, and Economic Stability Act =

2016 U.S. law and oversight board on Puerto Rico's debt crisis

- Other short titles: PROMESA
- Long title: To establish an Oversight Board to assist the Government of Puerto Rico, including instrumentalities, in managing its public finances, and for other purposes.
- Enacted by: the 114th United States Congress

Citations
- Public law: Pub. L. 114–187 (text) (PDF)

Legislative history
- Introduced in the House of Representatives as H.R.4900 by Sean Duffy (R–WI) on May 18, 2016; Committee consideration by United States House Committee on Natural Resources Judiciary; Education and the Workforce; Passed the 114th Congress (2015-2016) on June 9, 2016; Signed into law by President Barack Obama on June 30, 2016

United States Supreme Court cases
- Financial Oversight and Management Board for Puerto Rico v. Aurelius Investment, LLC, No. 18-1334, 590 U.S. ___ (2020); Financial Oversight and Management Board for Puerto Rico v. Centro de Periodismo Investigativo, Inc., No. 22-96, 598 U.S. ___ (2023)

The Puerto Rico Oversight, Management, and Economic Stability Act (PROMESA) is a U.S. federal law enacted in 2016 that serves as a custom-made bankruptcy law for Puerto Rico. It establishes a process for restructuring debt, and expedited procedures for approving critical infrastructure projects in order to combat the Puerto Rican government-debt crisis. Through PROMESA, the US Congress established a Financial Oversight and Management Board, known colloquially in Puerto Rico as "la junta" (the board), to oversee the debt restructuring. With this protection the then-governor of Puerto Rico, Alejandro García Padilla, suspended payments due on July 1, 2016. The FCB's approved fiscal austerity plan for 2017-2026 cut deeply into Puerto Rico's public service budget, including cuts to health care, pensions, and education, in order to repay creditors. By May 2017, with $123 billion in debt owed by the Puerto Rican government and its corporations, the FCB requested the "immediate" appointment of a federal judge to resolve the "largest bankruptcy case in the history of the American public bond market."

In response to legal challenges by creditors trying to reverse the debt recovery actions, the Supreme Court ruled in June 2020 that the Board's appointment, performed by the President only, was consistent with the Appointments Clause.

The Foraker Act of 1900 prevented the government of Puerto Rico and all of its municipalities from entering into debt in excess of seven percent of the aggregate tax value of its property.

== Overview ==
PROMESA enables the island's government to enter a bankruptcy-like restructuring process and halt litigation in case of default. Specifically, the establishment of the Financial Oversight and Management Board of Puerto Rico known colloquially as "La Junta" (a short form of "La Junta de Control Fiscal"), operates as an automatic stay of creditor actions to enforce claims against the government of Puerto Rico. The oversight board is to facilitate negotiations, or, if these fail, bring about a court-supervised process akin to a bankruptcy. The board is also responsible for overseeing and monitoring sustainable budgets. The President appointed all seven members of the board, six of whom were chosen from a list of individuals recommended by Congressional leaders and had previous ties to profitable industries in Puerto Rico. The Governor of Puerto Rico (or a designee) serves ex officio as an eighth member without voting rights. PROMESA authorizes the oversight board to designate a territory or territorial instrumentality as a "covered entity." Once designated, the covered entity is subject to the terms of PROMESA. On September 30, 2016, the oversight board designated the Commonwealth of Puerto Rico and certain other territorial instrumentalities as covered entities under PROMESA. As a covered entity, Puerto Rico is required to submit a fiscal plan. A fiscal plan must provide a method to achieve fiscal responsibility and access to the capital markets, and:

- provide for estimates of revenues and expenditures in conformance with agreed accounting standards and be based on--
- applicable laws; or
- specific bills that require enactment in order to reasonably achieve the projections of the Fiscal Plan;
  - ensure the funding of essential public services;
  - provide adequate funding for public pension systems;
  - provide for the elimination of structural deficits;
  - for fiscal years covered by a Fiscal Plan in which a stay under subchapters III or IV is not effective, provide for a debt burden that is sustainable;
  - improve fiscal governance, accountability, and internal controls;
  - enable the achievement of fiscal targets;
  - create independent forecasts of revenue for the period covered by the Fiscal Plan;
  - include a debt sustainability analysis;
  - provide for capital expenditures and investments necessary to promote economic growth;
  - adopt appropriate recommendations submitted by the Oversight Board under section 2145(a) of this title;
  - include such additional information as the Oversight Board deems necessary;
  - ensure that assets, funds, or resources of a territorial instrumentality are not loaned to, transferred to, or otherwise used for the benefit of a covered territory or another covered territorial instrumentality of a covered territory, unless permitted by the constitution of the territory, an approved plan of adjustment under subchapter III, or a Qualifying Modification approved under subchapter VI; and
  - respect the relative lawful priorities or lawful liens, as may be applicable, in the constitution, other laws, or agreements of a covered territory or covered territorial instrumentality in effect prior to June 30, 2016.

On October 14, 2016, Puerto Rico submitted a proposed fiscal plan to the oversight board. On November 23, 2016, the oversight board released its initial assessment of the fiscal plan submitted by Puerto Rico. The oversight board requested that the fiscal plan be amended to incorporate the following:

1. Define and incorporate key aspirational goals, benchmarks and metrics for a ten-year vision for Puerto Rico. This aspirational vision should drive Puerto Rico to stabilize its current economic, social, demographic and financial situation, increase the economy's resilience, shore up public finances, support long-term, durable growth, address basic needs and restore opportunity for the people of Puerto Rico;
2. Exclude any funding from an extension of Affordable Care Act as well as revenues from an extension of Act 154 revenues in light of their expiration (unless the assumption is accompanied by a specific bill). The Board supports efforts to extend Affordable Care Act funds and Medicaid parity for Puerto Rico, but consistent with the PROMESA Act the Board has to insure that the Fiscal Plan is based on existing law or a specific bill.
3. Incorporate a revised baseline forecast to reflect pay-go funding for pension benefits and segregation of current employee contributions beginning no later than 2018; and
4. Include a debt restructuring proposal and also a debt sustainability analysis.

On November 29, 2016, the Governor of Puerto Rico responded to the oversight board's assessment of the Commonwealth's proposed fiscal plan, asking for Medicaid parity in Puerto Rico, the extension of Obamacare funds, and requesting for further federal intervention and support.

With basic services risking privatization, and funding for pensions, education and healthcare already scarce, PROMESA strives to reallocate more public funding to restructure the $72 billion in debt. In late January 2017, the board created under PROMESA gave the government of Puerto Rico until February 28 to present a fiscal plan (including negotiations with creditors) to solve the problems. It is essential for the Commonwealth to reach restructuring deals to avoid a bankruptcy-like process under PROMESA. A moratorium on lawsuits by debtors was extended to May 31.

In January 2017 governor Ricardo Rosselló replaced Millstein and co with investment expert Rothschild & Co to assist in leading the restructuring process of Puerto Rico's debts. The company was also exploring the possibility of convincing insurers that had guaranteed some of the bonds against default, to contribute more to the restructuring, according to reliable sources. The governor also planned to negotiate restructuring of about $9 billion of electric utility debt, a plan that could result "in a showdown with insurers." Political observers suggest that his negotiation of the electrical utility debt indicated Rosselló's intention to take a harder line with creditors. Puerto Rico has received authority from the federal government to reduce its debt with legal action and this may make creditors more willing to negotiate instead of becoming embroiled in a long and costly legal battle.

On May 3, 2017, the Puerto Rico government formally invoked the bankruptcy-like restructuring procedure created by Title III of PROMESA by filing a petition in the U.S. federal district court for Puerto Rico. The petition did not use Official Form 201, Voluntary Petition for Non-Individuals Filing for Bankruptcy. Instead, it was filed on a similar-looking form for a "Title III Petition for Covered Territory or Instrumentality", on which the debtor's name was designated as "The Commonwealth of Puerto Rico".

== Composition of the Financial Oversight and Management Board ==
On August 31, 2016, President Obama appointed the seven members of the board.

Democratic Republican
Name	Began service	Party
Andrew G. Biggs	August 31, 2016	Republican
Betty A. Rosa	December 8, 2020	Democratic
John E. Nixon	December 8, 2020	Democratic
Arthur Gonzalez	August 31, 2016	Democratic
David Skeel	August 31, 2016	Democratic

Name	Position
David Skeel	Chairman
Robert Mujica	Executive Director
Jaime El Koury	Legal Counsel
José R. Pérez-Riera	Revitalization Coordinator
Omar Marrero	Representative of the government of Puerto Rico

In March 2017, Natalie Jaresko, former Minister of Finance in Ukraine, was appointed as the board's executive director. Her chairmanship was accompanied by multiple protests against the FOMBPR in Puerto Rico, the largest being a protest of 100,000 people in San Juan in the summer of 2019, before announcing her resignation in February 2022 effective on 1 April 2022. In 2019, Christian Sobrino, PROMESA's Representative of the Puerto Rican government, resigned in the wake of the Telegramgate scandal effective immediately on July 13, 2019. Robert Mujica became the Oversight Board’s executive director on January 1, 2023.

The law gives immunity to these board members in the face of any potential future lawsuits, stipulating that “The Oversight Board, its members, and its employees shall not be liable for any obligation of or claim against the Oversight Board or its members or employees or the territorial government resulting from actions taken to carry out this to carry out this Act” (PROMESA, 561). The board also has the power to ensure “the prompt enforcement of any applicable laws of Puerto Rico prohibiting public sector employees from participating in a strike or lockout” (PROMESA, 559).

== Response ==
Critics suggest that the law continues to treat the island as an "anomaly", remarking on Puerto Rico's somewhat unique status as a populous unincorporated territory of the United States, while also alleging that PROMESA does not do enough to deal with the problems that Puerto Rico's economy was facing when the bill was signed into law: high unemployment, welfare issues, and brain drain. Critics also claim that the United States Congress is granting unnecessarily broad powers to the new Fiscal Control Board, hindering Puerto Rico's development of democracy by allowing a federal body to effectively overrule all local authorities, and justifying such decisions through the Necessary and Proper Clause. According to Nelson Denis, the political and economic activities of the United States in Puerto Rico have created structural dependency, economic stagnation, and a growing debt problem that led to the creation of this fiscal plan in an attempt to resolve the situation. Some critics have accused the Fiscal Control Board of failing to look into the legitimacy of the lending-scheme debt.

In 2017, after the Board presented its plan, Joseph E. Stiglitz and Martin Guzman claimed that the Act and the Board that came with it "[are] bringing more problems than solutions" and that the appointed Board lacks "any understanding of basic economics and democratic accountability". As the Board's plan predicts a 16.2% decline in GNP for the next fiscal year with a further decline to follow and prioritizes payment to creditors, "a social [and] economic catastrophe" is "all but guarantee[d]". Stieglitz and Guzman proposed instead that steps to enhance economic growth and not debt repayments should be at center of a plan to solve the crisis. Similar critics have argued that the United States is attempting to enforce neoliberal economics on the island without its consent through the Board.

In 2017, Barry Sheppard wrote in Green Left Weekly that by 2014 when "the island's debt to US financial lenders hit US$73 billion," vulture capitalists bought the debt cheaply, demanded it be paid in full and that this law "created an un-elected seven-person financial board with sweeping powers over the island's economy".

In July 2019, Puerto Rican singers such as Bad Bunny, La India, Ricky Martin, and Residente led massive protests in Old San Juan demanding end of the Governor's reign and La Junta. Hundreds of thousands of people rallied for then-Governor Ricardo Rosello to “resign and take La Junta with you," and "cancel the debt." Many argue PROMESA amounts to the return of colonial rule over Puerto Rico. Filmmaker Francis Negrón-Muntaner stated that the Board is "composed of individuals with deep ties to the banking and investment world—including some involved in producing the debt crisis—and granted them broad powers over Puerto Rico’s elected government to assure that creditors will be paid.” In September 2019, thirteen members of the United States Congress included Alexandria Ocasio-Cortez and Bernie Sanders signed a letter that demanded that La junta disclose its conflicts of interest.

On February 22, 2021, U.S. Representative Nydia Velázquez (D–NY) introduced the first amendment to PROMESA, the Puerto Rico Recovery Accuracy in Disclosures Act of 2021 or PRRADA to combat conflicts of interest related to debt recovery. The bill “requires professionals employed in debt adjustment cases involving Puerto Rico to file verified statements disclosing their connections with the debtor, creditors, and other interested parties before seeking compensation for their services.” On February 24, 2021, the amendment passed unanimously.

Throughout its existence, the Board has received criticism for imposing directives with a colonial mindset and for employing austerity measures on a territory that cannot control the value of its own currency or seek emergency liquidity from international funding sources. PROMESA has driven the closure of hundreds of public schools, disrupting communities and concentrating students in overcrowded facilities, although some closures were caused by Puerto Rico's long-term population decline. Budget cuts at The University of Puerto Rico (UPR) have nearly tripled tuition, slashed financial aid, and threatened closure of smaller campuses, leading to declining enrollment and retention. The cuts have also caused teacher layoffs, reduced academic programs, deferred facility maintenance, reduced library services and research support, while students report inadequate classroom supplies, including basic items like toilet paper. The educational crisis is accelerating emigration, especially among young people and working families, further weakening Puerto Rico’s economic base and social future.

In June 2025, Puerto Rico Senate President Thomas Rivera Schatz introduced a resolution demanding that the United States Congress and the President of the United States dissolve the Puerto Rico Fiscal Oversight Board.

== Supreme Court challenge ==
As the Board began to agree to bankruptcy agreements, several of Puerto Rico's creditors sought legal action to challenge the foundation of PROMESA. They challenged the appointment of members to the Board by the President without Senate approval as a violation of the Appointments Clause which requires that any appointment of public officers be made with Senate approval. Initial claims at the District Courts to the creditors were denied, but in a combined case at the First Circuit Court of Appeals, the Circuit Court ruled in February 2019 that PROMESA did violate the Appointments Clause, but also ruled that all prior transactions to nullify Puerto Rico's debts were still valid. Parties on both sides petitioned to the Supreme Court: Puerto Rico and the Board seeking to challenge the determination that the Board's appointment violated the Appointments Clause, while the creditors sought to have all former decisions of the Board reversed. The Supreme Court accepted the petitions, consolidating the case under Financial Oversight and Management Board for Puerto Rico v. Aurelius Investment, LLC. Oral arguments were heard on October 15, 2019. The Court issued its unanimous decision on June 1, 2020, reversing the First Circuit's decision and declaring that the appointment of the Board members was constitutional since their duties were, as established by Congress, at a nonfederal level and thus were not officers of the United States as demanded by the Appointments Clause. As such, this further reversed the claims on subsequent Board decisions as well, allowing these to stand.

In May 2023, the United States Supreme Court ruled against a Puerto Rican media organization in its quest to obtain documents from the Federal Council to oversee the island's financial restructuring. The judges said that Congress has not been clear enough about lifting the Board of Financial Supervision and Management's sovereign immunity, which would allow Centro de Periodismo Investigativo Inc. to subpoena the board over documents related to the restructuring of the economy of Puerto Rico..

== July 2025 Assessment ==
On July 16, 2025, Congressional Research Service economic analyst D. Andrew Austin testified before the House Committee on Natural Resources, Subcommittee on Indian and Insular Affairs, regarding "Puerto Rico's Fiscal Recovery Under PROMESA and the Road Ahead."

Dr. Austin testified that:

1. Despite frequent conflicts between the oversight board and Puerto Rico's governor and legislature, budgeting and financial control practices were modernized and spending was reduced, helping to achieve balanced budgets.

2. Major portions of Puerto Rico's debts have been restructured. In 2019, COFINA bonds (bonds backed by sales taxes) were exchanged for new bonds, thus resolving creditor disputes. In January 2022, Puerto Rico's general obligation (GO) bonds and related debts were restructured, along with a major reform of pension systems. Puerto Rico's debts, which had reached about $73 billion, were reduced by some $40 billion.

3. Unanticipated events have set back Puerto Rico's anticipated recovery, including hurricanes Irma and María in 2017, earthquakes in 2020, the COVID-19 pandemic, and Hurricane Fiona in 2022.

The San Juan Daily Star reported in August 2025 that under the board's oversight, 4 of 5 of Puerto Rico's complex bankruptcies have been resolved. The unresolved bankruptcy involves an $8.5 billion claim brought by creditors of the Puerto Rico Electric Power Authority (PREPA).

== August 2025 Dismissals ==
On August 4, 2025, President Trump dismissed the five Democratic members of the Board, leaving the two Republican members in place. A White House official stated that the board "has been run inefficiently and ineffectively...for far too long." The firing raised the specter of another crisis in Puerto Rico sparked by unsustainable electric utility rates, while the legality of the firing has been questioned on the grounds that members can only be dismissed for just cause.

Experts view the dismissals as an attempt to pack the Board with allies of PREPA creditors who have opposed the offer to repay some $2.6 billion of the $8.5 billion that bondholders claim as principal of the debt. Puerto Rico Governor Jenniffer González does not expect Trump to make new appointments to the Board until after the Senate and House of Representatives return from their recesses in early September.

On August 14, the Trump administration dismissed Republican appointee Andrew Biggs from the Board, leaving Republican John Nixon as the sole Board member. Biggs had publicly called the previous dismissals of his colleagues "unjustified" and "a setback for Puerto Rico." The Board stated that it continues its daily work with the Governor and the Puerto Rico legislature as required by PROMESA.

== September 2025 Lawsuit ==
On September 18, 2025, former Board members Arthur J. Gonzalez, Andrew G. Biggs, and Betty A. Rosa filed suit against the Trump administration, claiming their dismissal was illegal. On October 3, 2025, U.S. District Court Judge Maria Antongiorgi-Jordán granted Plaintiffs' request for a preliminary injunction.

In October 2025, in ruling that the three Board members were never properly removed from office, the District Court enjoined the federal government from taking any steps to make their terminations effective.

== November 2026 AEPR Survey ==
According to the Puerto Rico Economists Association (AEPR), more than 60% of the Puerto Rican economists disapproved of the performance of the Fiscal Oversight Board over its 10 years of operation. AEPR President Julio César Hernández identified three main failures: the Board under-invested in updating and improving economic and demographic statistics; it has not strengthened the structures necessary for economic planning; and it has not created the necessary conditions to complete its job to "leave a fiscally responsible Puerto Rico, with the capacity to sustain long-term economic growth."

At least 70% of surveyed economists disagreed or strongly disagreed that the Board's policies have contributed positively to Puerto Rico's economic performance. 71% of respondents believe that the Board has failed to reduce the risk of another tax default. Asked if the Board's policies had contributed to Puerto Rico's economic growth, 49% of respondents strongly disagreed and an additional 27.5% disagreed. Only 11.8% of participants agreed, and no respondent strongly agreed. César Hernández stated that the Board's main achievement has been to achieve a balance between the income and expenses of the Central Government during the past five years.
