= Pou Chen Corporation =

Taiwanese footwear manufacturer

Pou Chen Corporation 寶成工業股份有限公司
- Company type: Listed company
- Industry: Footwear and electronics
- Founded: 1969
- Founder: Mr. C. J. Tsai
- Headquarters: Taichung City, Taiwan
- Area served: Worldwide
- Key people: Chairmen: C. C. Tsai, Chi Neng Tsai, Chi Hu Tsai
- Subsidiaries: Yue Yuen Industrial
- Website: Pou Chen Corporation

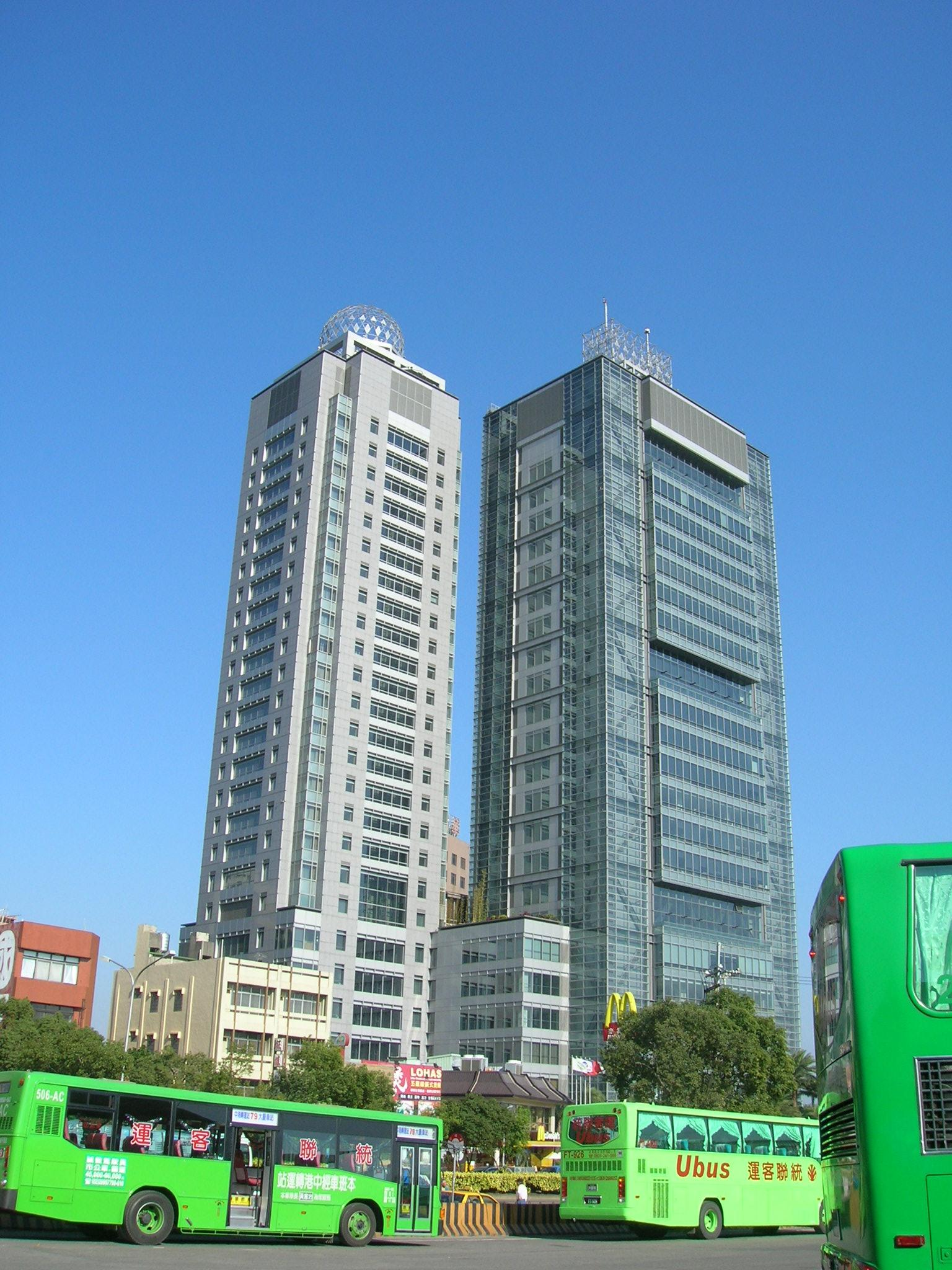
Headquarter of Pou Chen Corporation in Taichung City, Taiwan

Pou Chen Corporation (Chinese: 寶成工業股份有限公司) (Taiwan Stock Exchange Stock Code: 9904), or Pou Chen, is a leading footwear manufacturer in Taiwan, and the largest branded athletic and casual footwear manufacturer in the world. It is headquartered in Taichung City, Taiwan.

The Group was founded in Fuxing, Changhwa in 1969 by Tsai's family. It focuses on the manufacturing of athletic and casual footwear on an OEM/ODM basis for major global brands such as Nike, Adidas, Asics, Clarks, Reebok, Puma, New Balance, Crocs, Merrell, Timberland, Converse and Salomon. It owns production lines in China, Indonesia, Mexico and Vietnam. Its subsidiary, Yue Yuen Industrial Holdings (SEHK: 551), is the world's largest athletic shoe manufacturer which focuses on footwear material manufacturing.

In April 2014, 40,000 workers were protesting Yue Yuen Industrial Holding failure to pay the full social security and house renting contribution. The protests were triggered by a staff member who worked for 18 years at Yue Yuen who did not get her full pension. The company did not pay 250 yuan per month to the employee that they should have.

Besides footwear business, Pou Chen used to engage in electronics business by investing Global Brands Manufacture Limited (GBM), which is engaged in manufacturing printed circuit boards and assembling. However, the Great Recession caused the group to readjust its business strategy and to dispose its 40% stake in GBM by auction in March 2010.

== Link ==
- Pou Chen Corporation
- Yue Yuen Industrial Holdings

== See also ==
- List of companies of Taiwan
- Yue Yuen Industrial Holdings
