= University of Pennsylvania Law School =

Law school in Philadelphia, Pennsylvania, US

University of Pennsylvania Carey Law School
- Parent school: University of Pennsylvania
- Established: 1850; 176 years ago (first "full professor of Law" appointed in 1792)
- School type: Private law school
- Parent endowment: $22.3 billion (June 30, 2024)
- Dean: Sophia Z. Lee
- Location: 3501 Sansom Street, Philadelphia, Pennsylvania, United States; 39.953938°N 75.192085°W
- Enrollment: 755
- Faculty: 103
- USNWR ranking: 4th (tie) (2026)
- Bar pass rate: 96.7% (2024)
- Website: law.upenn.edu
- ABA profile: Standard 509 Report

The University of Pennsylvania Carey Law School (abbreviated as Penn Carey Law or Penn Law) is the law school of the University of Pennsylvania, a private Ivy League research university in Philadelphia, Pennsylvania. Penn Carey Law offers the degrees of Juris Doctor (J.D.), Master of Laws (LL.M.), Master of Comparative Laws (LL.C.M.), Master in Law (M.L.), and Doctor of the Science of Law (S.J.D.).

The entering class typically consists of approximately 250 students. Penn Carey Law's 2020 weighted first-time bar passage rate was 98.5 percent. For the class of 2024, 49 percent of students were women, 40 percent identified as persons of color, and 12 percent of students enrolled with an advanced degree.

== History ==
=== 18th century ===
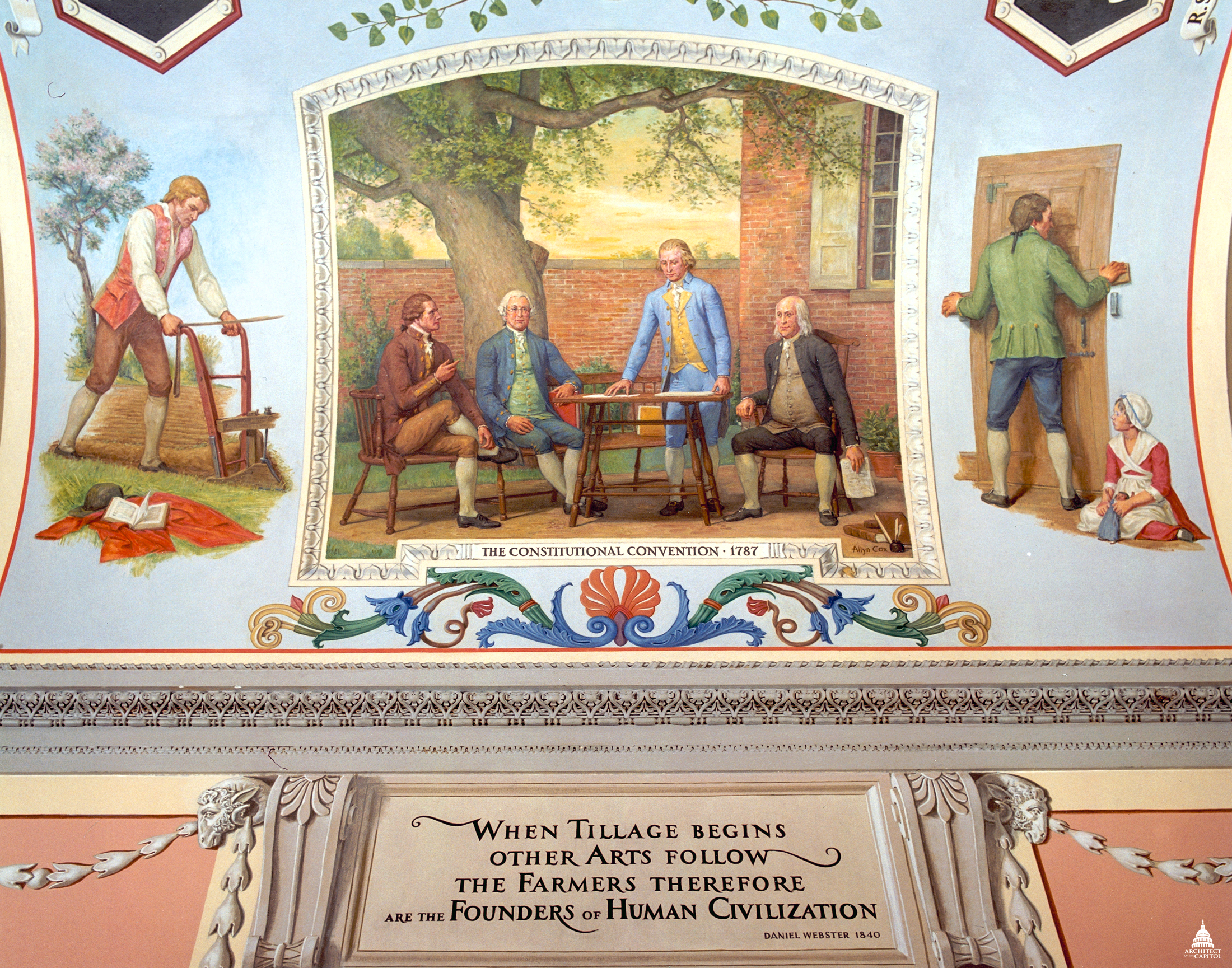
A 1974 portrait by Allyn Cox on display on the first floor of the U.S. House of Representatives wing of United States Capitol of the four primary framers of United States Constitution meeting in garden of Benjamin Franklin. Left to right: Alexander Hamilton, James Wilson, James Madison, and Benjamin Franklin

The University of Pennsylvania Law School traces its origins to a series of Lectures on Law delivered in 1790 through 1792 by James Wilson, one of only six signers of the United States Declaration of Independence and the United States Constitution. Wilson is credited with being one of the two primary authors (the other being James Madison) of the first draft of such constitution, due to his membership on the Committee of Detail established by the United States Constitutional Convention on July 24, 1787, to draft a text reflecting the agreements made by the Convention up to that point.

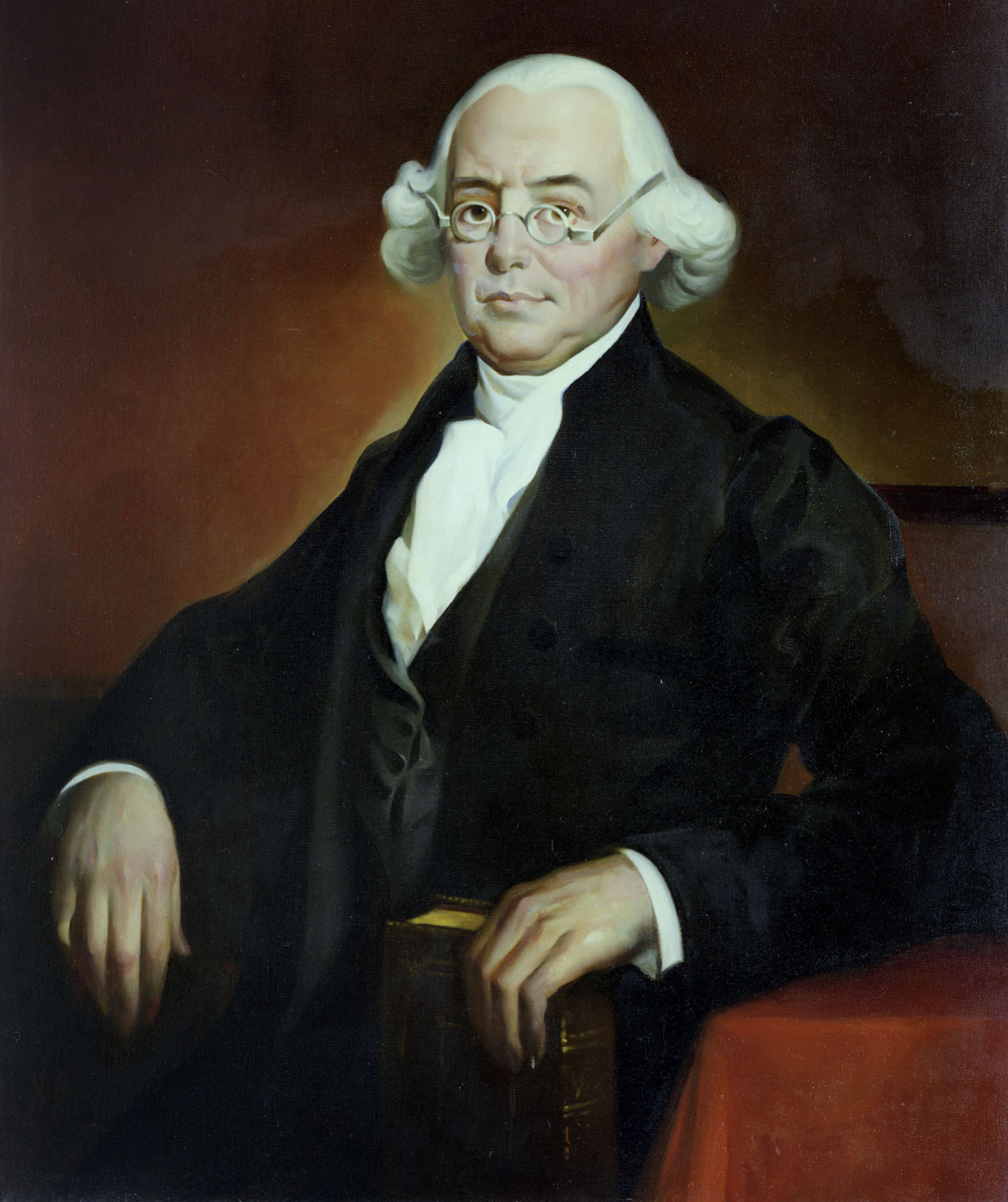
James Wilson was one of Penn's first law professors

As a professor at the University of Pennsylvania, Wilson gave these lectures on law to President George Washington and Vice President John Adams and the rest of George Washington's cabinet, including Secretary of State Thomas Jefferson. Wilson was one of the original five U.S. Supreme Court associate justices nominated by George Washington and confirmed by the U.S. Senate via unanimous voice vote on September 26, 1789. In 1792, Wilson was appointed as Penn's first full professor of law and remained a professor at Penn through the date of his death in 1798.

=== 19th century ===
In 1817, the University of Pennsylvania trustees appointed Charles Willing Hare as the second professor of law. Hare taught for one year before becoming "afflicted with loss of reason."

The University of Pennsylvania began offering a full-time program in law in 1850, under the leadership of the third professor of law at the Law Department of the University of Pennsylvania, George Sharswood. Sharswood was also named Dean of Penn's Law School in 1852 and served through 1867, and was later appointed as chief justice of the Supreme Court of Pennsylvania (1879–1882).

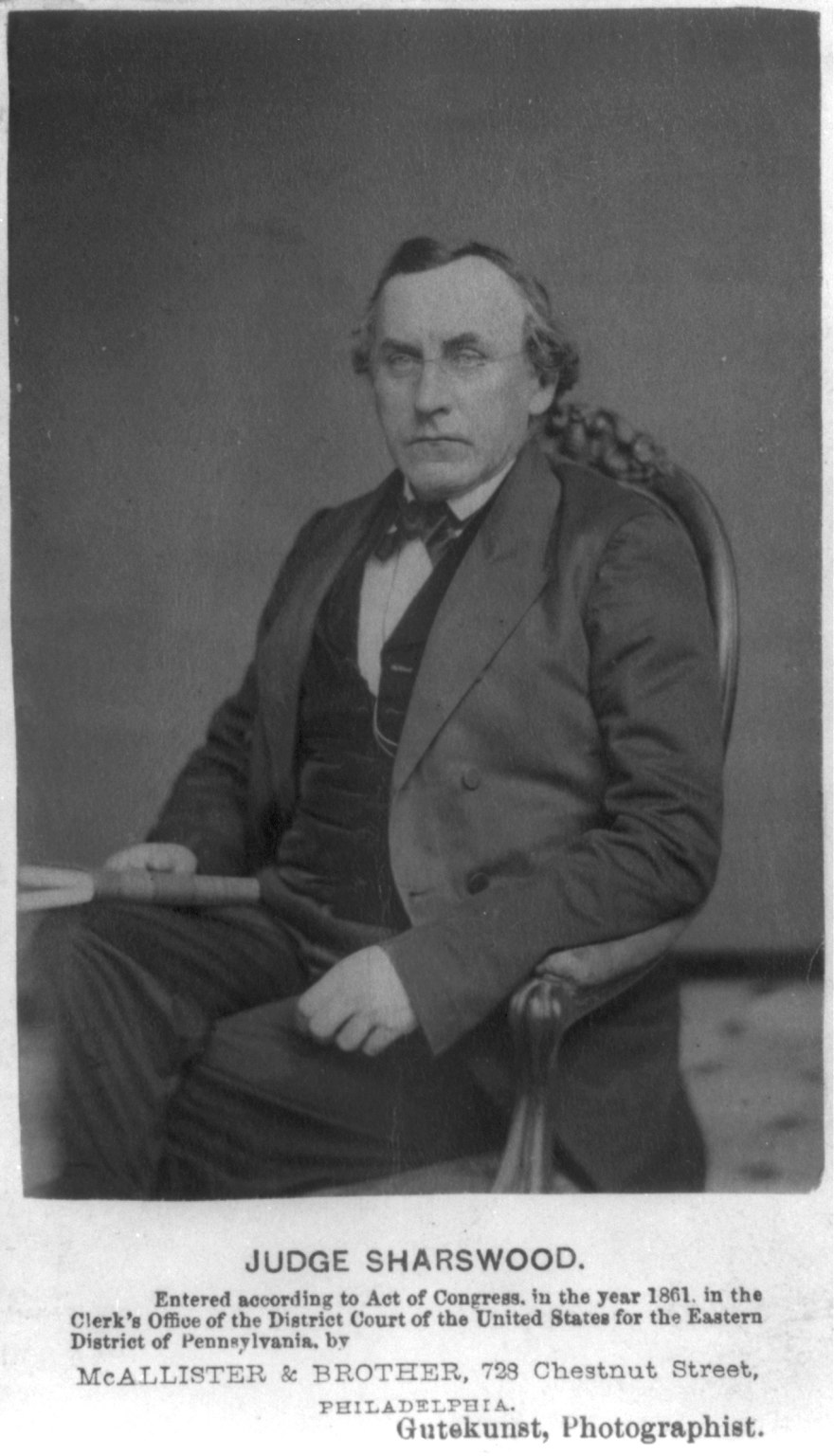
George Sharswood, the third professor of law and first dean of the Law Department of the University of Pennsylvania and later chief justice of Pennsylvania, in 1861

In 1852, the University of Pennsylvania was the first law school in the nation to publish a law journal. Then called The American Law Register, the University of Pennsylvania Law Review is the nation's oldest law review and one of the most-cited law journals in the world.

In 1881, Carrie Burnham Kilgore became the first woman admitted to, and, in 1883, to graduate from, the University of Pennsylvania Law School, and subsequently became first woman admitted to practice law in Pennsylvania.

In 1888, Aaron Albert Mossell became the first African-American man to earn a law degree from Penn. Sadie Tanner Mossell Alexander, Mossell's daughter, was awarded the Frances Sergeant Pepper fellowship in 1921 and subsequently became the first African-American to receive a PhD in economics in the United States, a degree she earned at the University of Pennsylvania. In 1927, Alexander became the first African-American woman to graduate from Penn Law and in 1929, she became the first African-American woman to be admitted to practice law in Pennsylvania.

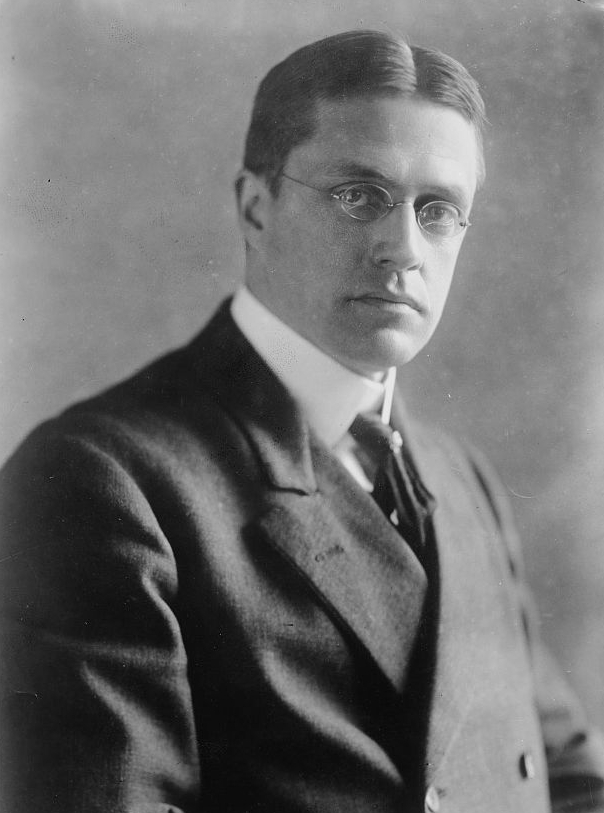
William Draper Lewis was named dean of Penn's then-named law department in 1896

William Draper Lewis was named dean of Penn's law department in 1896 and founded the American Law Institute.

=== 20th century ===
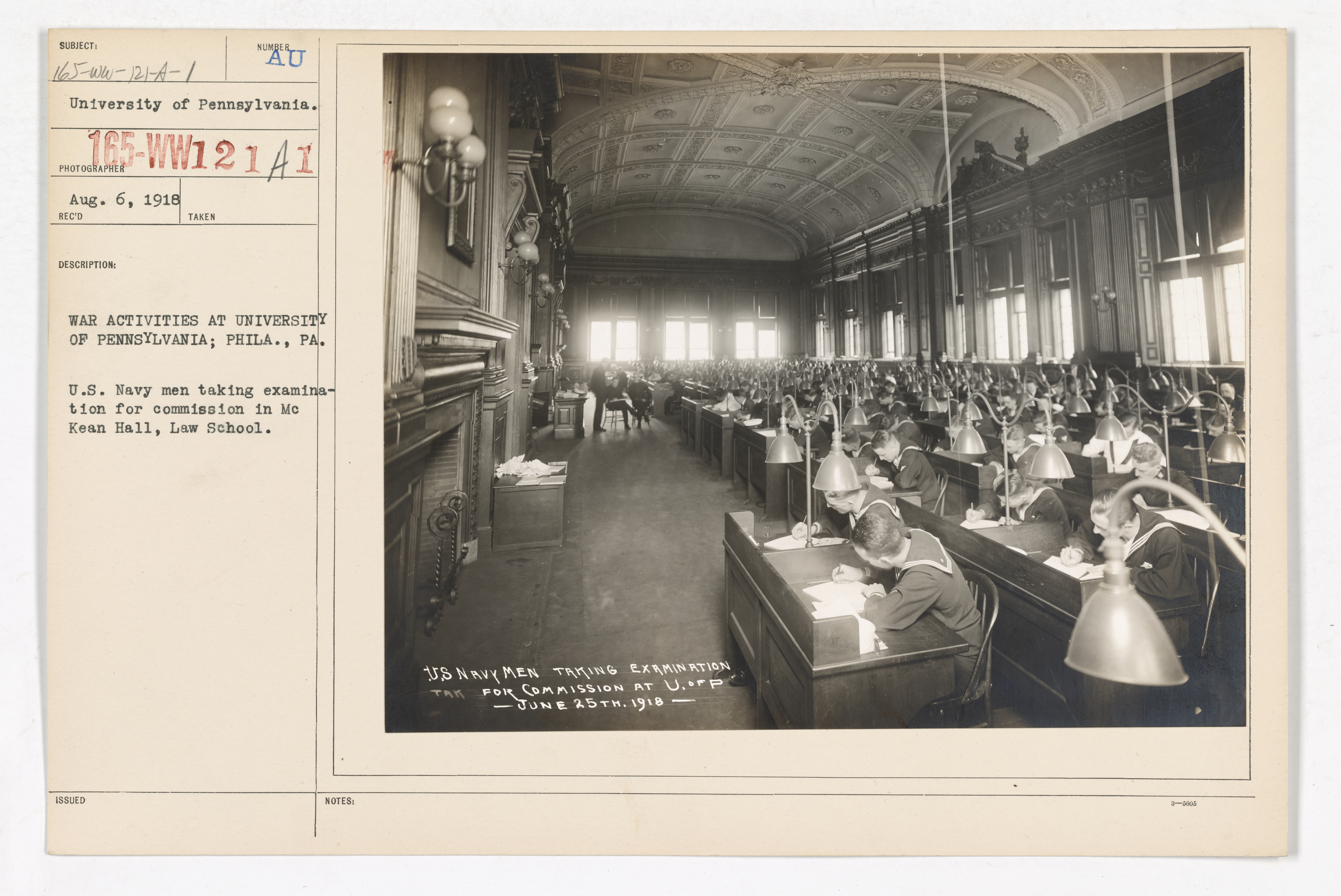
University of Pennsylvania students taking United States Navy examination for commission in McKean Hall at Penn Law in June 1918

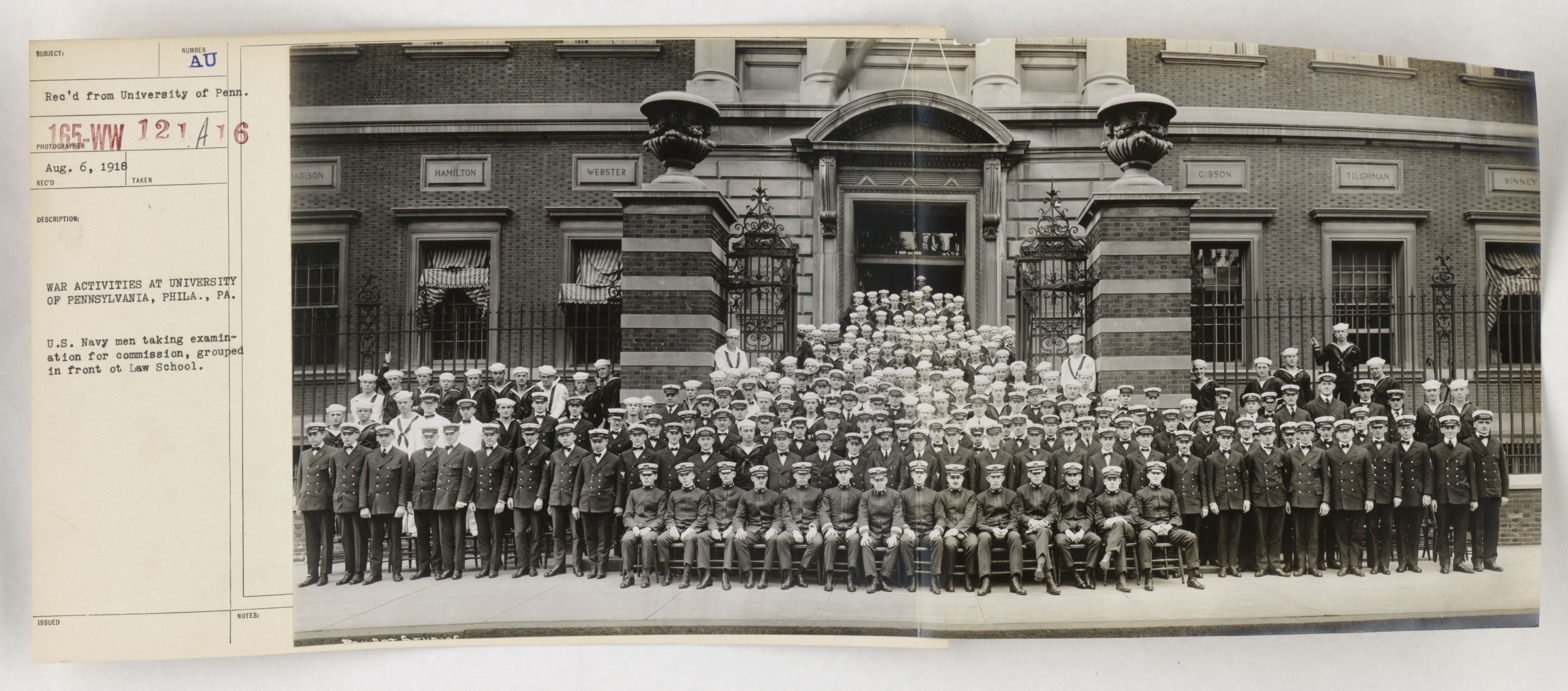
U.S. Navy men taking examination for commission grouped in front of Penn Law School main building in August 1918

In 1900, the trustees of the University of Pennsylvania approved his and others' request to move the Law School to the core of campus and its current location at the intersection of 34th and Chestnut Streets. Under Lewis' deanship, the Law School was one of the first schools to emphasize legal teaching by full-time professors instead of practitioners, a system that is still followed today.

As legal education became more formalized, the school initiated a three-year curriculum and instituted stringent admissions requirements.

After 30 years with the Law School, Lewis founded the American Law Institute (ALI) in 1925, which was seated in the Law School and was chaired by Lewis himself. The ALI was later chaired by another Penn Law Dean, Herbert Funk Goodrich, and Penn Law Professors George Wharton Pepper and Geoffrey C. Hazard Jr.

In 1969, Martha Field became the first woman to join the faculty at the Law School at Penn; she is now a professor at Harvard Law School. Other notable women who have been or are presently professors at Penn Carey Law include Lani Guinier, Elizabeth Warren, Anita L. Allen, and Dorothy Roberts.

From 1974 to 1978, the dean of the Law School was Louis Pollak, who later became a federal judge. Since Pollak ascended to the bench, Penn Law's deans have included James O. Freedman, former president of Dartmouth College, Colin Diver, former president of Reed College, and Michael Fitts, current president of Tulane University.

=== 21st century ===
In 2014, the University of Pennsylvania Law School established a master's degree and certificate program offering a specialized curriculum for professionals and students from diverse fields to enhance their understanding of legal principles and concepts. A tenth anniversary celebration of the master's program in 2024 involved a public interview between journalist Linda Greenhouse in and legal scholar Jeffrey Rosen, head of the National Constitution Center.

In November 2019, the University of Pennsylvania Law School was renamed the University of Pennsylvania Carey Law School after it received a US$128 million donation from the W.P. Carey Foundation. The school was renamed in honor of the foundation's first president, alumnus Francis J. Carey (1926–2014), the brother of William Polk Carey (1930–2012) who founded the W. P. Carey Inc real estate investment trust. The change was met by some controversy, and a petition to quash the abbreviated "Carey Law", in favor of the traditional "Penn Law", was circulated. The official short-form name, according to the school's 2025 style guide, is "Penn Carey Law".

Osagie O. Imasogie, a 1985 graduate of Penn Law, is the current chair of the school's board of overseers, having replaced Perry Golkin on January 1, 2021. Imasogie has been a member of the board since 2006 and more recently a trustees of the University of Pennsylvania. He is the first African-born chair of an American law school.

Except for the period during which the law school's policy prohibited military recruiters from recruiting on the law school campus during the don't ask, don't tell policy era, Penn Carey Law has actively supported the armed forces. The Harold Cramer Memorial Scholarship Program was established in June 2021 to ensure that all veterans admitted to the law school will be able to afford to attend.

== Academics ==
=== Admissions and costs ===
For the J.D. class entering in the fall of 2022, 9.74 percent out of 6,816 applicants were offered admission, with 246 matriculating. The class boasted 25th and 75th LSAT percentiles of 166 and 173, respectively, with a median of 172. The 25th and 75th undergraduate GPA percentiles were 3.61 and 3.96, respectively, with a median of 3.90. 13 percent of matriculating students identified as first-generation college students, and 35 percent identified as first-generation professional school students.

Over 1,250 students from 70 countries applied to Penn's LLM program for the fall of 2019. The incoming class consisted of 126 students from more than 30 countries.

The entering class typically consists of approximately 250 students, and admission is highly competitive. Penn Law's July 2018 weighted first-time bar passage rate was 92.09%. The law school is one of the "T14" law schools, that is, schools that have consistently ranked within the top 14 law schools since U.S. News & World Report began publishing rankings. In the class entering in 2018, over half of students were women, over a third identified as persons of color, and 10% of students enrolled with an advanced degree.

Based on student survey responses, ABA and NALP data, 99.6 percent of the Class of 2020 obtained full-time employment after graduation. The median salary for the Class of 2019 was $190,000, as 75.2 percent of students joined law firms and 11.6 percent obtained judicial clerkships. The law school was ranked #2 of all law schools nationwide by the National Law Journal, for sending the highest percentage of 2019 graduates to join the 100 largest law firms in the U.S., constituting 58.4 percent.

The total cost of attendance (including tuition of $63,610, fees, living expenses, and other expenses) for J.D. students for the 2020–2021 academic year was estimated by the university to be $98,920. The estimated cost of attendance increased by over 7% to $105,932 for the 2023–2024 academic year.

The University of Pennsylvania Carey Law School offers several large merit scholarships, up to full tuition, such as the Levy Scholars Program, Silverman Scholars, Dean's Scholarship, and the Earl R. Franklin and Barbara Corwin Franklin Endowed Merit Scholarship.

=== Centers and programs ===
==== Interdisciplinary studies ====
Throughout its modern history, Penn has been known for its strong focus on interdisciplinary studies, a continuation of policy promoted by the school's early 20th-century dean, William Draper Lewis. Penn Carey's tight integration with the rest of Penn's schools have created many interdisciplinary degree programs. More than 50 percent of courses are interdisciplinary, and Penn Carey offers more than 20 joint and dual degree programs, including a JD/MBA (Wharton School of the University of Pennsylvania), a JD/PhD in communication (Annenberg School for Communication at the University of Pennsylvania), and a JD/MD (Perelman School of Medicine).

Further JD-concurrent certificates and degrees include those in business and public policy with the Wharton School; in cross-sector innovation with the School of Social Policy and Practice; in international business and law with the Themis Joint Certificate with the ESADE in Barcelona; and in social cognitive and affective neuroscience. 19 percent of the Class of 2007 earned a certificate.

==== Toll Public Interest Center ====
Penn was the first national law school to establish a mandatory pro bono program, and the first law school to win the American Bar Association's Pro Bono Publico Award. The public interest center was founded in 1989 and was renamed the Toll Public Interest Center in 2006 in acknowledgement of a $10 million gift from Robert Toll (Executive Chairman of the Board of Toll Brothers) and Jane Toll. In 2011, the Tolls donated an additional $2.5 million. In October 2020, The Robert and Jane Toll Foundation announced that it was donating fifty million dollars ($50,000,000) to Penn Law, which is the largest gift in history to be devoted entirely to the training and support of public interest lawyers, and among the ten (10) largest gifts ever to a law school in the United States of America. The gift expands the Toll Public Interest Scholars and Fellows Program by doubling the number of public interest graduates in the coming decade through a combination of full and partial tuition scholarships.

=== Publications ===
Students at the law school publish several legal journals. The flagship publication is the University of Pennsylvania Law Review, the oldest law review in the United States. The University of Pennsylvania Law Review started in 1852 as the American Law Register, and was renamed to its current title in 1908. It is one of the most frequently cited law journals in the world, and one of the four journals that are responsible for The Bluebook, along with the Harvard, Yale, and Columbia law journals. Penn Law Review articles have captured seminal historical moments in the 19th and 20th centuries, such as the passage of the Nineteenth Amendment; the lawlessness of the first and second World Wars; the rise of the civil rights movement; and the war in Vietnam.

Other law journals include:

- University of Pennsylvania Journal of Constitutional Law, one of the top 50 law journals in the United States based on citations and impact.
- University of Pennsylvania Journal of International Law, formerly known as Journal of International Economic Law, formerly known as Journal of International Business Law, formerly known as Journal of Comparative Business and Capital Market Law
- University of Pennsylvania Journal of Business Law, formerly known as Journal of Business and Employment Law
- University of Pennsylvania Journal of Law and Social Change
- Asian Law Review, formerly known as East Asian Law Review, formerly known as Chinese Law and Policy Review
- Journal of Law & Public Affairs

== Campus ==
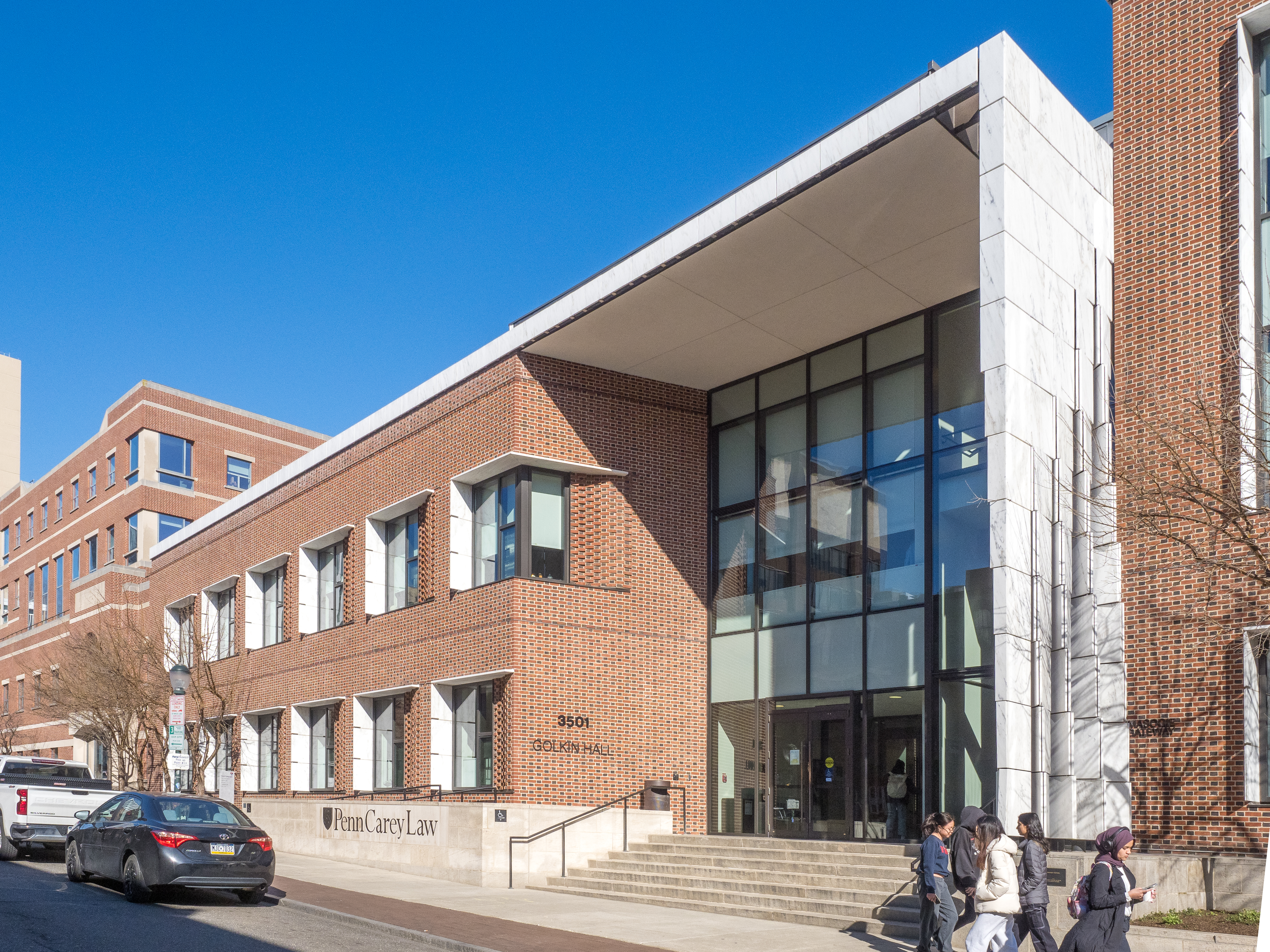
Golkin Hall on the University of Pennsylvania school campus in West Philadelphia

The University of Pennsylvania campus covers over 269 acres (1.09 km^{2}) in a contiguous area of West Philadelphia's University City district. All of Penn's schools, including the law school, and most of its research institutes are located on this campus. Much of Penn's architecture was designed by the architecture firm of Cope & Stewardson, whose principal architects combined the Gothic architecture of the University of Oxford and the University of Cambridge with the local landscape to establish the Collegiate Gothic style.

The law school consists of four interconnecting buildings around a central courtyard. At the east end of the courtyard is Silverman Hall, built in 1900, housing the Levy Conference Center, classrooms, faculty offices, the Gittis Center for Clinical Legal Studies, and administrative and student offices. Directly opposite is Tanenbaum Hall, home to the Biddle Law Library, several law journals, administrative offices, and student spaces. The law library houses 1,053,824 volumes and volume equivalents, making it the 4th-largest law library in the country. Gittis Hall sits on the north side, containing offices and classrooms. Opposite is Golkin Hall, which contains 40,000 square feet (3,700 m^{2}) and includes a state-of-the-art courtroom, 350-seat auditorium, seminar rooms, faculty and administrative offices, a two-story entry hall, and a rooftop garden.

A small row of restaurants and shops faces the law school on Sansom Street. Nearby are the Penn Bookstore, the Pottruck Center (a 115,000-square-foot (10,700 m^{2}) multi-purpose sports activity area), the Institute of Contemporary Art, a performing arts center, and area shops.

== Reception ==
=== Clerkships ===
Since 2000, Penn has had seven alumni serve as judicial clerks at the United States Supreme Court. This record gives Penn a ranking of 10th among all law schools for supplying such law clerks for the period 2000–2019. Penn has placed 48 clerks at the U.S. Supreme Court in its history, ranked 11th among law schools; this group includes Curtis R. Reitz, who is the Algernon Sydney Biddle Professor of Law, emeritus at Penn.

=== Employment ===
According to ABA and NALP data, 99.6 percent of the Class of 2020 obtained full-time employment after graduation. The median salary for the class of 2019 was $195,000 (equivalent to $245,558 in 2025), as 75.2 percent of students joined law firms and 11.6 percent obtained a judicial clerkship. Many students pursue public interest careers with the support of fellowship grants such as the Skadden Fellowship, called by The Los Angeles Times "a legal Peace Corps."

About 75 percent of each graduating class enters private practice, bringing with them the ethos of pro bono service. In 2020, the school placed more than 70 percent of its graduates into the United States' top law firms, maintaining Penn's rank as the number one law school in the nation for the percentage of students securing employment at these top law firms. It was ranked #4 of all law schools nationwide by Law.com in terms of sending the highest percentage of 2021 graduates to the largest 100 law firms in the U.S. (55 percent).

Based on student survey responses, ABA, and National Association for Law Placement data, 99.2% of the class of 2018 obtained full-time employment after graduation, with a median salary of $180,000, as 76% of students joined law firms and 11% obtained judicial clerkships. The law school was ranked # 2 of all law schools nationwide by the National Law Journal in terms of sending the highest percentage of 2018 graduates to the 100 largest law firms in the United States (60%).

== People ==
=== Notable alumni ===
Among the school's alumni are a U.S. Supreme Court Justice, at least 76 judges of United States court system, 18 state Supreme Court Justices (with 8 serving as chief justice), 3 supreme court justices of foreign countries, at least 46 members of United States Congress as well as 9 Olympians, 5 of whom won 13 medals, several founders of law firms, university presidents and deans, business entrepreneurs, leaders in the public sector, and government officials.

=== Notable faculty ===
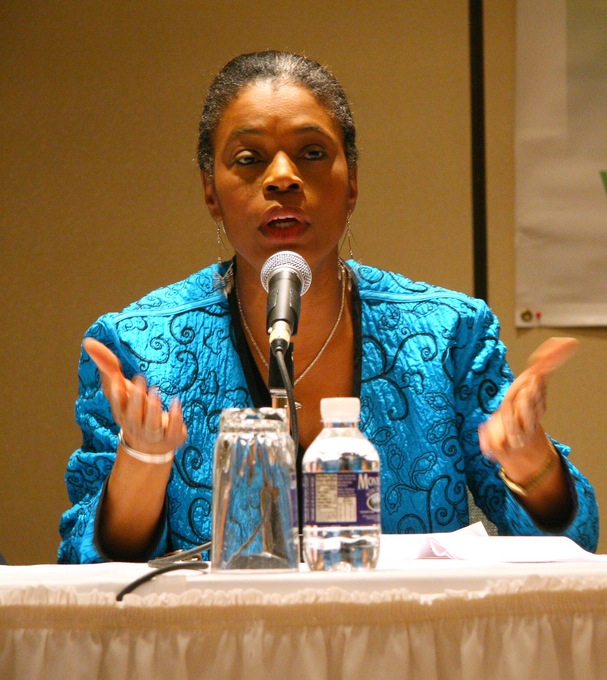
Anita L. Allen, a University of Pennsylvania Law School professor of law and philosophy

The law school's faculty is selected to match its inter-disciplinary orientation. Seventy percent of the standing faculty hold advanced degrees beyond the JD, and more than a third hold secondary appointments in other departments at the university. The law school is well known for its corporate law group, with professors Jill Fisch and David Skeel being regularly included among the best corporate and securities law scholars in the country. The School has also built a strong reputation for its law and economics group (professors Tom Baker, Jon Klick, and Natasha Sarin), its criminal law group (professors Stephanos Bibas, Leo Katz, Stephen J. Morse, Paul H. Robinson, and David Rudovsky) and its legal history group (professors Sally Gordon, Sophia Lee, Serena Mayeri, Karen Tani). Some notable Penn Law faculty members include:

- Anita L. Allen, Henry R. Silverman Professor of Law and professor of philosophy
- Tom Baker, deputy dean and insurance law
- Stephanos Bibas, criminal law scholar, current judge for the US Court of Appeals for the Third Circuit
- Stephen B. Burbank, David Berger Professor for the Administration of Justice
- Cary Coglianese, Edward B. Shils Professor of Law and professor of political science; director, Penn Program on Regulation
- Douglas Frenkel, Morris Shuster Practice Professor of Law, director of Mediation Clinic
- Leo Katz, Frank Carano Professor of Law
- Jonathan Klick, Charles A. Heimbold Jr. Professor of Law
- Michael Knoll, Theodore K. Warner Professor of Law & Professor of Real Estate; Co-director, Center for Tax Law and Policy
- Charles ("Chuck") Mooney Jr., Charles A. Heimbold Jr. Professor of Law
- Curtis R. Reitz, commercial law professor; Pennsylvania representative to the National Conference of Commissioners on Uniform State Laws
- Dorothy E. Roberts, George A. Weiss University Professor of Law and Sociology and Raymond Pace and Sadie Tanner Mossell Alexander Professor of Civil Rights
- Kermit Roosevelt, David Berger Professor for the Administration of Justice
- David Rudovsky, civil rights and criminal defense professor
- Chris William Sanchirico, Samuel A. Blank Professor of Law, Business, and Public Policy; Co-director, Center for Tax Law and Policy
- Anthony Joseph Scirica, current judge, and former chief judge, of the United States Court of Appeals for the Third Circuit
- George Sharswood, former dean of the University of Pennsylvania Law School, chief justice of the Supreme Court of Pennsylvania, and member of the Pennsylvania House of Representatives
- Beth A. Simmons, Andrea Mitchell University Professor in Law, Political Science, and Business Ethics
- Amy Wax, Robert Mundheim Professor of Law and neurologist
- Tobias Barrington Wolff, Jefferson B. Fordham Professor of Law; deputy dean, alumni engagement and inclusion
- Christopher Yoo, John H. Chestnut Professor of Law, Communication, and Computer & Information Science; director of the Center for Technology, Innovation & Competition

Penn Law's faculty is complemented by renowned international visitors in the frames of the Bok Visiting International Professors Program. Past and present Bok professors include Helena Alviar (dean of Faculty of Law, University of the Andes), Armin von Bogdandy (director at the Max Planck Institute for Comparative Public Law and International Law), Radhika Coomaraswamy (under secretary general of the United Nations), Juan Guzmán Tapia (the first judge who prosecuted former Chilean dictator Augusto Pinochet), Indira Jaising (Additional Solicitor General of India), Maina Kiai (United Nations Special Rapporteur on the rights to freedom of peaceful assembly and of association), Akua Kuenyehia (judge of the International Criminal Court and law dean of University of Ghana), Pratap Bhanu Mehta (president of the Centre for Policy Research), and Michael Trebilcock (distinguished university professor at the University of Toronto). Some of Penn's former faculty members have continued their careers at other institutions (e.g., Bruce Ackerman (now at Yale), Lani Guinier (now at Harvard), Michael H. Schill (now at Oregon), Myron T. Steele (now at Virginia), and Elizabeth Warren (at Harvard until her election to the United States Senate)).
