= Gasoducto del Sur =

Proposed pipeline to supply natural gas to Puerto Rico

Location
- Country: Puerto Rico
- Direction: west-east
- Start: Peñuelas
- Passes through: Ponce, Juana Diaz, Santa Isabel
- To: Salinas

General information
- Type: Natural gas
- Owner: Government of Puerto Rico
- Operator: Autoridad de Energia Electrica (AEE)
- Contractors: Skanska
- Construction started: Not started.

Technical information
- Length: 42 mi (68 km)
- Diameter: 20 in (508 mm)

The Gasoducto del Sur ('Southern Gas Pipeline') was a pipeline to supply natural gas to Puerto Rico for conversion to electricity proposed by the administration of Governor Aníbal Acevedo Vilá. The pipeline would have run from Peñuelas, in Puerto Rico's south central coast to electricity-generating plants in Salinas, running in an easterly fashion along Puerto Rico's southern coast. The project aimed to supply a portion of Puerto Rico's electrical energy needs while lowering the cost of electricity in the island.

The Gasoducto del Sur project faced stiff opposition from the public, environmentalists—including Casa Pueblo—and others.

== History ==
In 1993, the chairman of the Puerto Rico Electric Power Authority (AEE), Miguel Cordero, proposed a natural gas pipeline as part of the Government of Puerto Rico's plan to diversify Puerto Rico's energy sources. However, the proposal did not proceed during the administration of the Partido Nuevo Progresista (PNP) governor Pedro Rosselló (1993–2000). In 2001, the Popular Democratic Party of Puerto Rico (PPD) won the gubernatorial elections, put Sila Calderon in La Fortaleza from 2001 to 2004, and appointed Héctor Rosario as executive director of the AEE. The pipeline plan proposed by Cordero was shelved. In 2005, a natural gas pipeline project named Gasoducto del Sur (English: Southern Gas Pipeline) started construction under the PPD administration of Aníbal Acevedo Vilá. The Gasoducto del Sur pipeline would have transported natural gas from the EcoEléctrica facilities in Peñuelas to the power plant at Aguirre in Salinas. Acevedo Vilá managed to complete about 25% of the Gasoducto del Sur project before being defeated by the opposing party, the PNP, in the 2008 elections. When the PNP took back La Fortaleza in 2009 via Luis Fortuño as governor, Miguel Cordero was reappointed executive director of the AEE, and the Gasoducto del Sur project, though a quarter of its way completed, was abruptly cancelled. The cancellation left the Government of Puerto Rico with a US$59 million debt to the contractor, Skanska, and opened the way for the PNP's alternative project, Gasoducto del Norte. However, after strong environmental and popular opposition to the Gasoducto del Norte project, on 11 October 2012, the Puerto Rico Electric Power Authority (AEE) withdrew the entire Gasoducto del Norte Gsoducto del Norte permit application from the U.S. Army Corps of Engineers evaluation process, thereby stalling approval of the proposed pipeline indefinitely.

In November 2013, the project was under reconsideration by the administration of Governor Alejandro García Padilla.

== Route ==
The proposed pipeline would distribute natural gas from the Costa Sur Sugar Plantation (Peñuelas/Guayanilla area) north to the Salinas plant. The proposed route would cut through Puerto Rico's southern region. It would cross 6 municipalities.

== Technical features ==
The pipeline was to be operated by AEE. The gas to be transported by the pipeline will be supplied by EcoElectrica.

The pipeline will have a diameter of 20 inches (510 mm). It would have a length of 42 miles (68 km). Autoridad de Energia Electrica plans to convert several oil-fired plants to natural gas, starting with Costa Sur's units 5 and 6, which should be up and running December 2011. Subsequently, AEE plants at Salinas will convert to natural gas. Dr. Arturo Massol González, professor at the University of Puerto Rico, winner of the 2003 Goldman Environmental Prize, and director of Casa Pueblo, a community-based environmental watchdog organization in Puerto Rico, opposed the project on environmental, safety and technical grounds arguing that the project would run through highly populated southern coast areas and that it will not be capable of supplying the natural gas needed for processing in Salinas.

== Controversies ==
The project has been highly controversial due to environmental, safety, and technical concerns.

=== Environmental impact ===
Some argue that the pipeline, should it be built, will negatively impact sensitive areas, hydrographic basins, and lands fit for agriculture. It will also represent further dependence on another form of fossil fuel that, while less polluting than the current oil-based system of electricity generation, will still contribute to global warming.

=== Proper infrastructure ===
According to officials at EcoEléctrica, gas output at their facilities will not provide enough natural gas to power generators beyond Costa Sur, the first gas-to-electric conversion unit in the path of the pipeline and located in the municipality of Peñuelas.

Opponents argue that "building a pipeline when there is no gas, makes no sense" and are demanding that the government abandon the project altogether: the admission by a high-ranking officer of EcoEléctrica to La Perla del Sur is a decisive and unequivocal confirmation that what we have been stating for months.

=== Safety concerns ===
The Puerto Rico director of the Caribbean Tsunami Alert Program, Crista Von Hillebrant, confirmed to a local news weekly that EcoElectrica – the only point of entry for the natural gas to be injected into the Gasoducto – was located in a tsunami risk zone.

=== Ethical issues ===
==== Alternatives ====
Excelerate Energy signed a contract to supply liquid-to-gas natural gas conversion barges to the Autoridad de Energia Electrica's southern unit at Aguirre, proving that it is feasible to deliver gas directly to Salinas. The government had claimed that off-shore barges were not a viable alternative. In an article titled Barcazas pueden sustituir Gasoducto del Norte (Barges can substitute Gasoducto del Norte) it was reported that barges are a viable alternative to gas pipelines.

On 30 May 2012, the Puerto Rico Senate held hearings on the project and found that "the temporary transition to propane gas and the future delivery of natural gas via offshore vessels and submarine gas pipelines are viable alternatives, both from the technical as well as the financial perspectives", to pipelines.
