= Marguerite Fund =

Pan-European infrastructure fund manager

- Formerly: 2020 European Fund for Energy, Climate Change and Infrastructure
- Company type: Société anonyme
- Industry: Investment fund
- Founded: 2010; 16 years ago
- Founders: European Investment Bank and several EU Member countries
- Headquarters: Luxembourg
- Area served: Europe
- Products: Investments in renewables, energy and transport
- Website: www.marguerite.com

Marguerite (or the 2020 European Fund for Energy, Climate Change and Infrastructure) is a pan-European infrastructure fund manager that invests in energy and renewables, digital transformation, waste & water and transport. The fund's headquarters is in Luxembourg, with offices in Paris and Milan.

== History ==
Marguerite was established in 2010 by the European Investment Bank, Caisse des dépôts et consignations, Cassa Depositi e Prestiti, Instituto de Crédito Oficial, Kreditanstalt für Wiederaufbau and Powszechna Kasa Oszczędności Bank Polski as part of the European Economic Recovery Plan, with €710 commitments. Marguerite I launched in 2010, at a time when investors had little trust in greenfield infrastructure after the 2008 financial crisis.

The EIB and the national EU member state promotional banks committed €700 million to the second fund by November 2017, and a private investor in 2018 contributed another €40 million. The EIB, with the European Fund for Strategic Investments guarantee, doubled the commitment in Marguerite II to 200 million, marking it as the EU bank's largest investment in an infrastructure fund.

Like its predecessor, Marguerite II was a pan-European equity fund aiming to act as a catalyst for new (“greenfield”) and expansion to existing (“brownfield”) infrastructure investments in renewables, energy, transport and digital infrastructure.

In late 2022, Marguerite launched Marguerite III, which reached its final close in December 2024. Its investment strategy and sectorial focus follow the previous funds.

== Investments ==
The fund has invested in the Butendiek Wind Farm off Germany, the Tychovo and the Kukinia wind farms in Poland. the Thorntonbank Wind Farm off Belgium, Chirnogeni Wind Farm in Romania, Massangis 1 and Toul-Rosières 2 photovoltaic plants in France, the Poznań incineration plant in Poland, ], Fraport Greece and the Zagreb International Airport in Croatia, the N17/N18 Motorway project in Ireland, and the Autovía de Arlanzon Motorway in Spain.

The latest fund – Marguerite III – has so far made seven investments:

- Wattif – a Nordic EV charging point operator
- Swan – an independent telecommunications operator in Slovakia
- CleverSE – an Italian energy efficiency specialist
- Nexun – a pan-European solar PV development platform
- Rebi – a district heating network in Spain
- SotySolar – an Iberian renewable energy services company and
- OnTrain – a new rolling stock company (Rosco) offering modern electric locomotives to freight operators in Poland.

Since launching the first fund, the company has deployed more than €1.5 billion into projects designed to address the changing infrastructure landscape in Europe, by integrating ESG principles and creating positive change for society.

== ESG alignment ==
Marguerite invests in infrastructure bringing essential environmental and social value to society – and strives to further contribute to the creation of sustainable living environments.

In 2024, the company joined the Net Zero Asset Managers initiative and committed to align its portfolio with net zero emissions pathways by 2050 or sooner across assets under management.
