= Toul-Rosières Solar Park =

Solar farm in Toul-Rosières, France

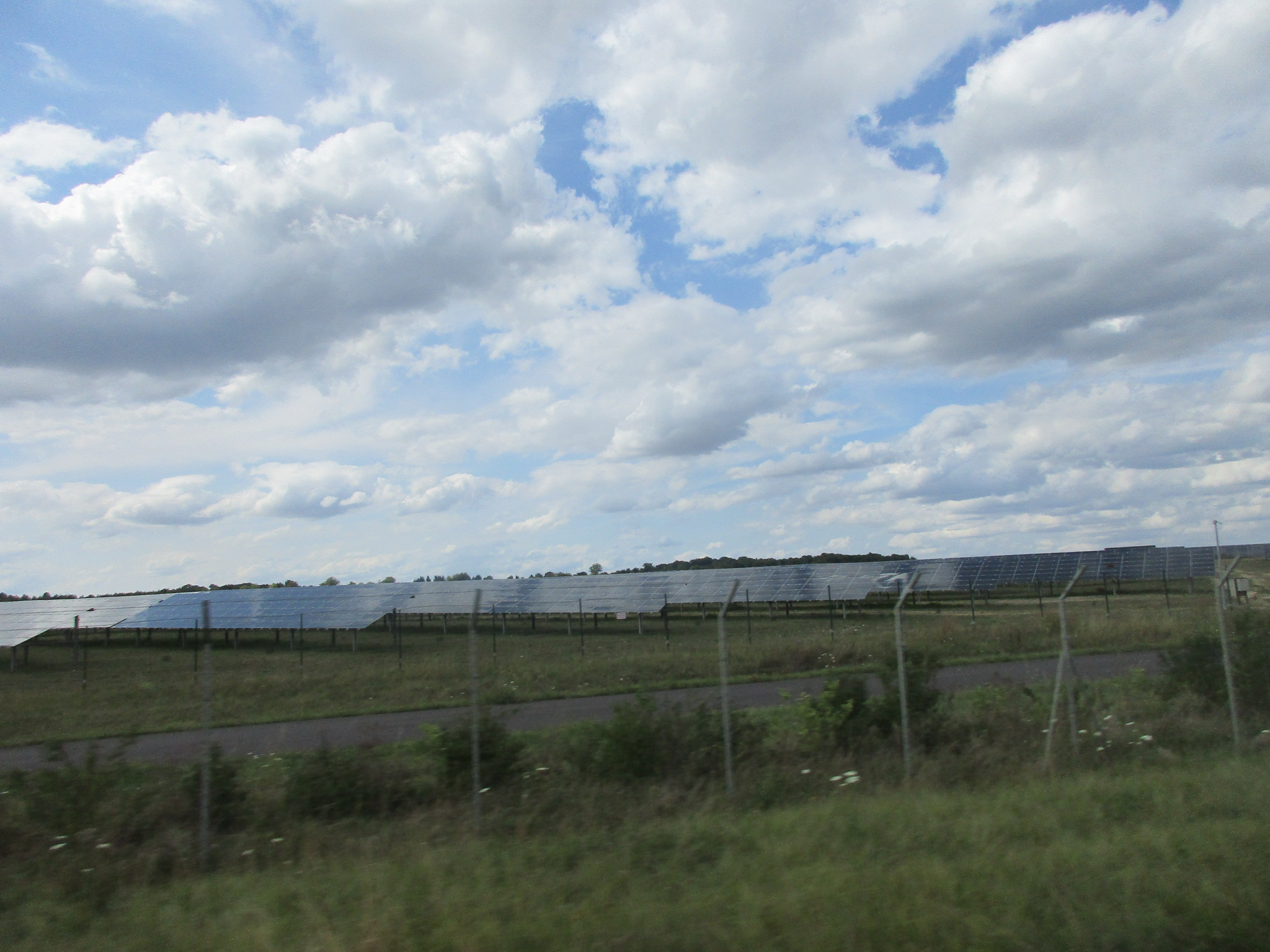
- Country: France
- Location: Toul-Rosières, (Meurthe-et-Moselle)
- Coordinates: 48°47′N 5°59′E
- Status: Operational
- Construction began: 2011
- Commission date: August 2012
- Construction cost: €430 million
- Owners: EDF Énergies Nouvelles; Marguerite Fund; Sonnedix
- Operator: EDF Énergies Nouvelles

Solar farm
- Type: Flat-panel PV
- Site area: 367 ha (907 acres) footprint

Power generation
- Units operational: ≈1.4 million
- Nameplate capacity: 115 MW; 135 MW (Planned)

External links
- Commons: Related media on Commons

The Toul-Rosières Solar Park is a 115 megawatt (MW) solar farm located at the former Toul-Rosières Air Base, in France. In November 1953, the 465th Troop Carrier Group of the United States Air Force with Fairchild C-119 Flying Boxcars moved to Toul-Rosières Air Base and was assigned to the 63d Troop Carrier Wing. Later, the airbase housed the 21st Fighter-Bomber Group in the late 1950s, before being handed over to the French Air Force.

The park is the largest solar power station using photovoltaic technology in France. The project was developed by EDF Énergies Nouvelles (EDF EN).

The solar park has about 1.4 million thin-film PV panels based on CdTe technology made by the US company First Solar. It covers an area of 367 hectares (910 acres).

In 2012, the Luxembourg-based Marguerite Fund acquired a 36 MW stake in the solar park. A 24 MW stake was sold to the independent power producer Sonnedix.

== See also ==
- Photovoltaic power stations
- List of photovoltaic power stations
- Solar power in France
- United States Air Force in France
