= Daniel Rosa =

Daniel Rosa or Rosas may refer to:

== Musicians ==
- Daniel Rosa, contestant on The Voice (U.S. season 3)
- Daniel Rosa (violinist) on Dream This

== Sportspeople ==
- Daniel de la Rosa (born 1993), Mexican racquetball player
- Daniel la Rosa (born 1985), German racing driver
- Daniel Rosas (born 1989), Mexican boxer

== Other(s) ==
- Daniel Rosas Sanchez, fictional character in Man on Fire (2004 film)
- Daniel Pagan Rosas of Vía Verde project
