= Puerto Rico Electric Power Authority =

Government agency in Puerto Rico

Puerto Rico Electric Power Authority Autoridad de Energía Eléctrica de Puerto Rico
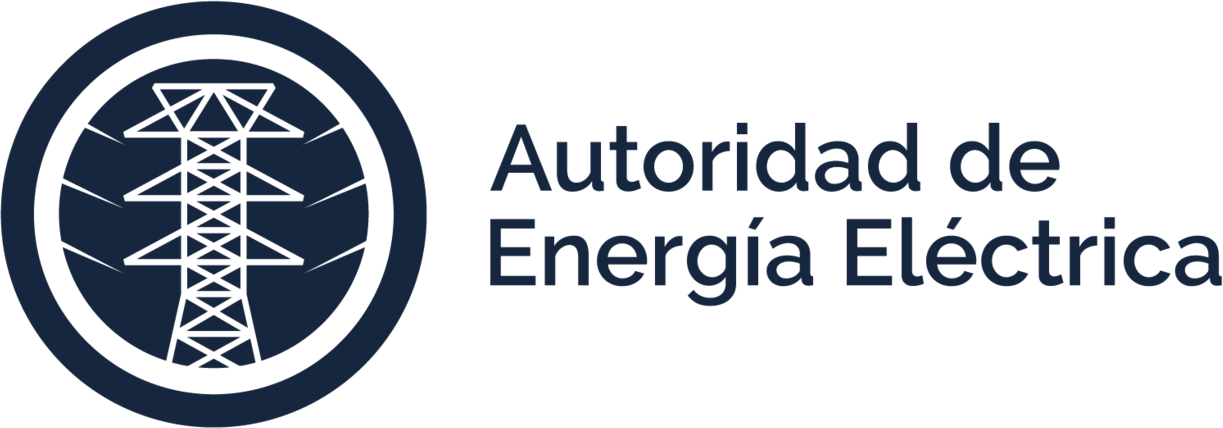

Public corporation overview
- Formed: May 2, 1941; 85 years ago
- Jurisdiction: Government of Puerto Rico
- Headquarters: 1110 Ponce de León Avenue, Santurce, San Juan, Puerto Rico
- Public corporation executives: Vacant, Executive director; Ralph A. Kreil Rivera, Chair of the Governing Board
- Website: aeepr.com

The Puerto Rico Electric Power Authority (PREPA; Spanish: AEE) is an electric power company owned by the Commonwealth of Puerto Rico responsible for electricity generation, power distribution, and power transmission on the island.

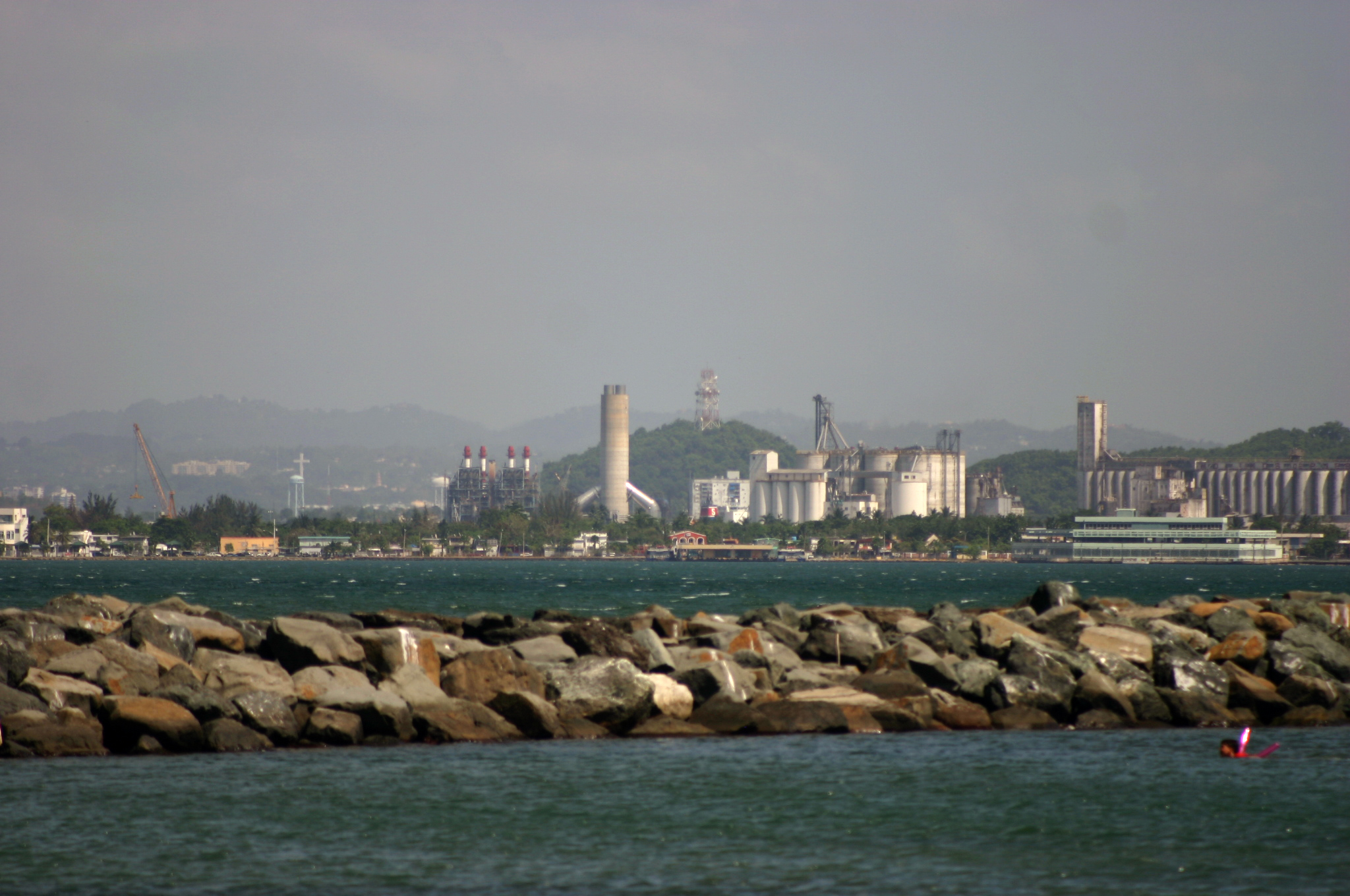
PREPA at Palo Seco

Before 2014, the authority was managed by a board of directors appointed by the governor with the advice and consent of the Senate. After 2014, PREPA was managed by the Puerto Rico Energy Commission, a government agency whose board of directors was appointed by the governor.

Hurricane Maria in September 2017 destroyed PREPA's distribution network, creating a blackout in all parts of the island.

In 2017, PREPA declared bankruptcy and began a privatization process. In 2021, as part of the privatization process, Luma Energy took over Puerto Rico's power transmission and distribution system. After suing Luma in July 2025 over damages to customer appliances during chronic power blackouts since Hurricane Maria, the Puerto Rican government sued Luma in December 2025 to cancel its contract with the company. In 2023, Genera PR, a subsidiary of New Fortress Energy, took over operation of the island's power plants. After the second Trump administration fired five of the seven members of the federal control board overseeing PREPA's bankruptcy in August 2025 and bondholders terminated an agreement with the board in response, the bankruptcy proceedings were restarted in October 2025. The board had rejected a rate increase in February 2025 as part of PREPA's debt restructuring. As of January 2026, PREPA remains in bankruptcy.

Following years of financial distress, severe hurricane damage, and massive debt, PREPA entered restructuring proceedings under PROMESA, while operations of its transmission and distribution system were transitioned to private operators like LUMA Energy to modernize the island's grid.

== History ==
PREPA was originally named the Puerto Rico Water Resources Authority (PRWRA), created by Act 83 on May 2, 1941, during the governorship of Rexford G. Tugwell. Government-owned, PRWRA unified diverse regional and local electric power companies into one unified electric grid.

In 1979, under Law 71, PRWRA changed its name to the Puerto Rico Electric Power Authority (PREPA), since hydropower was no longer the primary source of energy in Puerto Rico.

=== Outages ===
Throughout its history, PREPA has suffered several outages that have left regions or the entire island of Puerto Rico without power.

In August 2012, 14,000 residents were left without power following Tropical Storm Isaac.

One of these islandwide outages occurred on September 20, 2016, due to a fire at one a PREPA facility known as Central Aguirre. All of Puerto Rico was without power for three days.

On occasion, entire sectors have reportedly been left without power when an animal, such as a cat or an iguana, has caused damage to the grid.

As a result of the 2019–20 Puerto Rico earthquakes the Costa Sur Power Plant in Guayanilla was knocked out of service. An estimated 327,000 customers were left without power, and many, as a result, were also without water service. The President of the AEE/PREPA, Jose Ortiz, informed there was extensive damage in the facilities and that repairs would take more than a year. FEMA assigned $238 million to help cover cost related to backup units which are used to meet the demand previously covered by Costa Sur.

In September 2021 demand for electricity exceeded supply after mechanical and maintenance problems affected various power plants, resulting in four days of consecutive rolling blackouts. Central Aguirre and Palo Seco faced problems with the removal of seaweed due to lack of replacement filters that are used to prevent the accumulation of seaweed. The power outages caused classes to be canceled at the Pontifical Catholic University of Puerto Rico and instigated a student protest at the University of Puerto Rico.

=== Hurricanes Irma and Maria ===
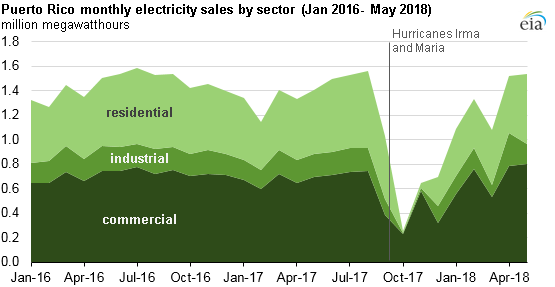
Hurricanes Irma and Maria sharply reduced the availability of electricity throughout the island

At the beginning of September 2017, the eye of Hurricane Irma passed north of the island. The strong winds left 1 million residents without power. Power was restored to most, but not all, by September 20, when Hurricane Maria struck, leaving nearly the entire island without power. Two weeks later, power had been restored to about 10 percent of customers. Full restoration took months. Many residents bought generators. Electric companies in unaffected areas ordinarily make contracts for speedy assistance to those hit by disaster, but in this case negotiations took weeks.

The initial $300 million contract for power restoration was given to Whitefish Energy, a Montana company which had only two employees on the day the hurricane struck. The award was controversial on those and other grounds, and was cancelled on October 29. By December 2017, the Army Corps of Engineers had other contractors in place, along with crews brought in through mutual aid agreements with utilities such as Con Edison.

Six weeks after Hurricane Maria, 30 percent of customers had been restored. After two months, almost half had been restored.

On January 6, 2018, representatives of FEMA, the U.S. Army Corps of Engineers, and their armed security details entered a Palo Seco warehouse owned by PREPA to obtain and distribute a massive store of spare parts needed to restore grid power. PREPA has been accused of hoarding the materials and hence delaying the restoration of power. The equipment has since been distributed.

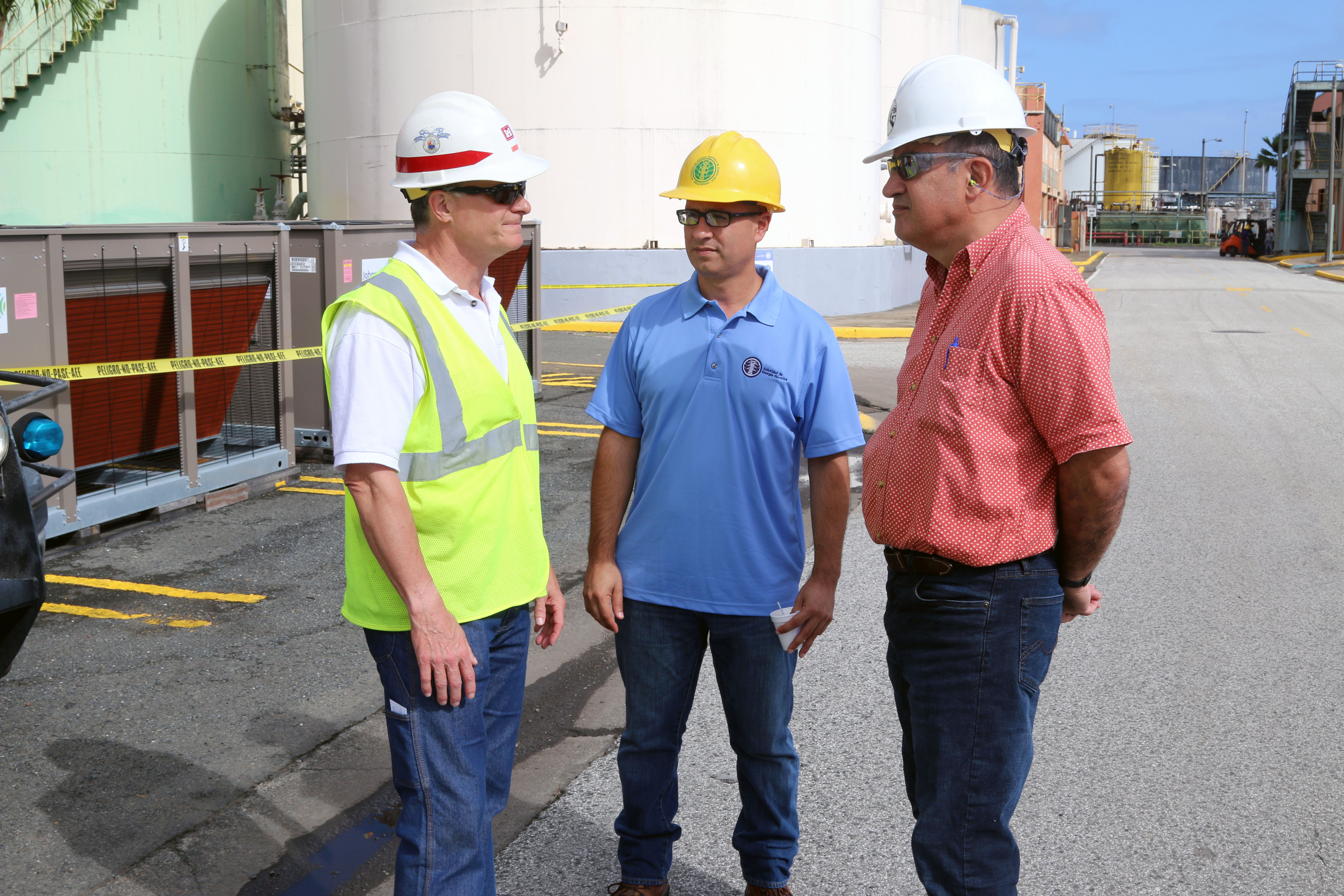
Energy workers at Palo Seco in February 2018

In January 2018, it had been predicted that generation would reach 95% by the following month, and 100% of customers would be restored by June 2018.

On April 18, 2018, an accident at a transmission line knocked out the electrical grid of Puerto Rico. All the island lost power. The following afternoon, PREPA announced that service had been restored to 97% of customers, the same percentage as before this blackout. 40,000 customers were still out of service due to the hurricane seven months earlier.

With June 1 the official start of the 2018 hurricane season, an estimated 11,000+ customers remained without power, possibly for another two months. Although an estimated $3.8B was spent on power grid work since the September hurricanes, the grid is still considered fragile and vulnerable. PREPA announced a $500M one-year master service agreement with MasTec for further power grid reconstruction and modernization services.

=== LUMA Energy ===
In June 2020 governor Wanda Vázquez Garced and the AEE/PREPA signed a contract with LUMA Energy that would give the company control of the AEE/PREPA electric grid for 15 years. The meeting in which the contract (which contains over 300 pages in length) was approved lasted only 43 minutes.

The UTIER along with the other unions of the authority expressed disapproval of the contract, organized strikes and submitted amendments to the contract. The Puerto Rico House of Representatives called for postponing the contract until 2022 and launched an investigation into the contract.

In October 2024, the Special Commission of the Puerto Rico Bar concluded that the contract, between the two agreements, violated fundamental legal principles, but also contributed to worsening the energy situation of Puerto Rico. The Special Commission of the Puerto Rico Bar recommends, a Litigation in nullity, or Resolution according to the contractual terms.

In July 2025, PREPA faced increased scrutiny over its role in the island’s energy crisis. Reports noted that PREPA retained control of all customer revenues despite the privatization of operations, a situation linked to ongoing blackouts and operational instability. Under the oversight of Energy Czar Josué Colón Ortiz, PREPA withheld substantial funds from private operators LUMA Energy and Genera PR, contributing to budget shortfalls, unfunded storm reserves during hurricane season, and delays in fuel payments affecting generation capacity. The utility was also associated with disputed contracts, including a 15-year liquefied natural gas supply deal criticized for unfavorable terms and a blocked $1 billion emergency power agreement found not to meet technical, financial, and ethical requirements. Observers compared these issues to the mismanagement and lack of transparency that had previously led to PREPA’s bankruptcy and slowed post–Hurricane Maria recovery.

=== Genera PR ===
In 2023, Genera PR, a subsidiary of New Fortress Energy, signed a ten-year contract to take over operation of Puerto Rico's power plants.

In March 2025, Governor Jennifer Gonzalez Colon changed the government's contract with Genera PR, as an act of taxation. On July 7, 2025, the Puerto Rico Energy Office rejected the renegotiation of the public-private partnership contract with Genera PR for energy production.

== Controversies ==
=== Maintenance ===
PREPA’s electrical infrastructure has experienced long-term deterioration due to decades of underinvestment and insufficient maintenance. The system is aging faster than it can be repaired, with many power plants and substations operating beyond their intended lifespan. Equipment failures in one part of the grid can cause outages across wider areas.

Over the years the budget for maintenance, which includes such activities as clearing trees near power lines, has diminished. In 2007 it was $251 million and in 2014 it was $202 million. Widespread dissatisfaction with the energy system continues. Although the company LUMA Energy currently manages power distribution, much of the public criticism targets infrastructure that remains under PREPA’s control.

=== Leadership and corruption charges ===
PREPA has also been affected by corruption scandals and frequent changes in leadership. After Hurricane Maria in 2017, U.S. Congress investigated claims that PREPA officials accepted bribes in exchange for prioritizing power restoration to certain areas and businesses. In addition to corruption, poor financial decisions and deferred maintenance by local officials contributed to the utility’s problems. A Government Accountability Office report concluded that PREPA lacked the capacity to manage or upgrade its grid effectively.

=== Controversial $1.5 billion fossil fuels project ===
In 2017, during Hurricane Maria an unsolicited offer by New Fortress Energy was made to PREPA. In 2020, a court order required the awarded-contract documents be made public and showed several irregularities including that the company doesn't have a liquid-gas production track record in Puerto Rico and that rather than go through a bidding process, the contract was approved quickly. Chris Christie, the former governor of New Jersey was listed as a paid lobbyist for PREPA, in the documents. Ingrid Vila Biaggi, the former Puerto Rico Chief of Staff, made a request for an independent investigation. In 2021 various environmental groups requested the cancellation of the contract.

=== Office of the Comptroller 2020 audit ===
An audit in 2020 from Puerto Rico's Office of the Comptroller examined PREPA capital improvement projects from 2010-2018 concluded that PREPA's operations during this period did not adhere to applicable laws and regulations, leading to financial losses and hindering accountability. The audit identified what it called wasteful spending by PREPA, including $191.4 million on projects that yielded no utility, such as the Gasoducto del Sur ($69.2 million), Vía Verde ($31.9 million), Unit Conversion ($47.9 million), Aerogenerators ($3.7 million), and land acquisition ($1 million). The investigation uncovered contracting irregularities for the Vía Verde project, including failure to solicit multiple proposals, lack of board approval for large contracts, payments made before contracts were formalized, missing contractor capacity evaluations, and payments exceeding authorized amounts. PREPA also failed to update its by-laws to incorporate legislative amendments, did not publish required board meeting summaries and public hearing recordings online, and neglected to evaluate board compliance with industry governance standards.

Additionally, the audit revealed a severe lack of transparency, as PREPA's website lacked crucial information required by law, including its organizational chart, governing documents, code of ethics, board meeting minutes, and detailed contract information. PREPA's financial management was found deficient, operating with an accounting manual last updated in 1989, lacking documentation defining account purposes, and failing to establish procedures for reconciling its account numbering system with Federal Energy Regulatory Commission requirements. The report also concluded that PREPA had not properly registered acquired assets, including six land parcels and structures, in its accounting system, an issue that had been previously flagged by external auditors.

For example, during the Gasoducto del Sur project, PREPA entered into complex arrangements with government entities that led to additional costs, including $62.8 million disbursed by AFICA to acquire project assets and provide credit, warehouse rental fees of $342,500, interest payments of $3.2 million, and $6.7 million to reacquire assets that were later transferred to another agency. The audit stated that these financial entanglements strained multiple government entities during Puerto Rico's fiscal crisis and demonstrated the cascading negative effects of PREPA's project mismanagement.

=== Manufactured financial crisis ===
A financial dispute involving PREPA has led to operational challenges for LUMA Energy and Genera PR. PREPA has reportedly withheld around $700 million in operational funding owed to the two companies, despite continuing to collect customer revenue. As a result, LUMA reported a shortfall of $190 million to $350 million, contributing to a 12% increase in outage duration and a 2% rise in outage frequency over the previous year.

PREPA also failed to fund a storm reserve account designated for emergency response, raising concerns given Puerto Rico’s vulnerability to hurricanes. Genera PR has faced difficulties paying fuel suppliers, leading one contractor to block shipments at the Port of San Juan over unpaid invoices.

The Financial Oversight and Management Board confirmed PREPA’s revenue shortfalls. In response, the Puerto Rico Energy Bureau launched a rate case—the first since 2017—to help stabilize revenue. However, government officials led by Colón have reportedly opposed rate increases due to political considerations.

=== LNG fuel contract controversy ===
A 15-year liquefied natural gas (LNG) supply contract, valued in the billions of dollars, was awarded to two subsidiaries of New Fortress Energy Inc.—NF Energía and Genera PR—prompting controversy.

The FOMB criticized the agreement, citing a lack of justification from government entities. The FOMB also alleged that LNG shipments were deliberately withheld following the expiration of a previous contract, possibly to pressure regulators into approving the new agreement. Although Colón denied any involvement, the companies stated he led the government’s negotiations.

=== Whitefish 2.0 ===
To address a generation shortfall and recurring rolling blackouts, PREPA awarded an emergency power contract, valued between $500 million and $1 billion, to Power Expectations LLC, a Florida-based company. Subsequent investigations revealed that the company lacked experience in utility-scale energy projects, and its CEO had a criminal record. A legal challenge led a Puerto Rican court to block the contract, citing the company’s failure to meet basic technical, financial, and ethical criteria.

Critics have labeled this situation “Whitefish 2.0,” referencing a notorious 2017 scandal.

As a result, the Request for Proposals (RFP) was reopened, delaying the addition of temporary generation capacity needed for the summer and worsening power outages. Critics compared the situation to the 2017 Whitefish controversy. Josué Colón’s earlier plan to deploy LNG barges was abandoned after several months in favor of land-based units, though it remains uncertain whether these will be operational in time to reduce outages.

== Structure ==
=== Board of directors ===
PREPA’s board of directors governed the company and typically included private citizens representing public interests, along with ex officio public officials such as the Secretary of Economic Development and Commerce. Two board members were elected by residential customers and one by commercial customers. However, when the governor and legislature were from the same party, the legislature could change the board's composition. The governor usually appointed four members with Senate approval, making the board more politically influenced than a neutral utility body.

== Energy sources ==
The majority of Puerto Rico's electricity is generated using oil and natural gas fired power plants. Puerto Rico also has 21 reservoirs that produce hydroelectric energy.

In 2019 the Puerto Rican government passed legislation requiring the closure of coal fired power plants by 2028 and achieving 100% renewable energy by 2050. A report in 2021 criticized the government for delays in processing applications for electrical interconnection. At the time of said report only 327 applications where approved, representing 0.09% of the total.

In 2021 the government unveiled plans for the Puerto Rico Ocean Technology Complex (PROtech) an Ocean thermal energy conversion project on the southeast coast.

=== Power plants ===
PREPA serves close to 1.5 million customers through several power plants (as of 2015): In 2020 the agency continues to report that it serves 1.5 million customers. On July 1, 2023, every generation plant owned by PREPA got taken over by private company Genera PR.

Power plant	Capacity	Energy source	Ownership	Owner	Operator	Location
AES Ilumina	24 MW	solar power	private	AES Corporation	AES Corporation	Guayama
AES Puerto Rico	454 MW	coal	private	AES Corporation	AES Corporation	Guayama
Aguirre Combined Cycle	592 MW	diesel fuel	private	Genera PR	Genera PR	Salinas
Aguirre Thermoelectric	900 MW	heavy fuel oil	private	Genera PR	Genera PR	Salinas
Cambalache	248 MW	diesel fuel	private	Genera PR	Genera PR	Arecibo
Costa Sur	990 MW	heavy fuel oil	private	Genera PR	Genera PR	Guayanilla
EcoEléctrica	510 MW	natural gas	private	Gas Natural Fenosa, International Power	Gas Natural Fenosa	Peñuelas
Mayaguez	168 MW	diesel fuel	private	Genera PR	Genera PR	Mayaguez
Oriana Solar Farm	45 MW (58MW(_{DC}))	solar power	private	Sonnedix	Sonnedix	Isabela
Palo Seco	602 MW	heavy fuel oil	private	Genera PR	Genera PR	Cataño
Punta Lima	26 MW	wind power	private	Sovereign Bank	Gestamp Wind	Naguabo
Salinas Solar Park	16 MW	solar power	private	Sonnedix	Sonnedix	Salinas
San Juan Combined Cycle	464 MW	diesel fuel	private	Genera PR	Genera PR	San Juan
San Juan Thermoelectric	400 MW	heavy fuel oil	private	Genera PR	Genera PR	San Juan
San Fermin Solar Farm	27 MW	solar power	private	Uriel Renewables and Coqui Power	Uriel Renewables and Coqui Power	Loiza
Santa Isabel Wind Farm	75 MW	wind power	private	Pattern Energy	Pattern Energy	Santa Isabel
Windmar Ponce	4.5 MW	solar power	private	Windmar Renewable Energy	Windmar Renewable Energy	Ponce

=== Subsidiaries ===
The public corporation also provides fiber optic broadband to private carriers through one of its subsidiary, PREPA Networks. PREPA is also studying the possibility of selling energy to the United States Virgin Islands with the installation of an underwater power cable between Fajardo and the island of St. Thomas—similar to the power cable with which it services its clients in the island municipalities of Vieques and Culebra.

== Finances ==
PREPA's operating expenses for FY2013 denote how fuel purchases take over 58% of the authority's operating expenses.

As of 2014 the authority carries liabilities of US$10.1 billion against assets of $6 billion. It also operates with a deficit of about $354 million against revenues of $4.8 billion. In terms of costs, $2.6 billion or about 58% of PREPA's expenses are attributed to fuel purchases alone while salaries and collective bargains represent less than 13% of the authority's expenses.

On May 23, 2014, Citigroup severely curtailed PREPA's line of credit for fuel purchase, forcing PREPA to run out of cash to pay Petrobras, its main oil supplier. Petrobras, in turn, threatened to cut off further shipments to the authority. This forced the authority to take $100 million out of its Capital Improvements Fund in order to pay its debt to Petrobras. PREPA argues that the different agencies of the government of Puerto Rico owe them more than $290 million in debt, while an additional $375 million of revenue is lost through subsidies enacted by the Puerto Rican legislature. An additional $600 million is owed to the authority by residential and commercial consumers, some of them by consumers living in public housing. The authority argues that it wouldn't have a problem being self-sufficient if it were paid the aforementioned debt and if it weren't forced to give out subsidies. On June 3, 2014, senator Ramón Luis Nieves admitted publicly that, "part of the financial problem at PREPA was provoked by the government and the Puerto Rican legislature."

On June 11, 2014, Fitch Ratings downgraded its rating on the authority's to speculative non-investment grade ("junk status") from BB+ to BB while putting the authority on negative rating watch. PREPA filed for bankruptcy in July 2017.

PREPAs' two largest creditors are OppenheimerFunds and Franklin Templeton.

As of 2021 the payment of PREPA's debt remains in an indefinite "limbo" due to a lack of agreement between the government of Puerto Rico and bond holders. PREPA's debt totals over $9 billion and according to David Skeel, the new president of the Financial Oversight and Management Board for Puerto Rico, it will have to be renegotiated in light of the COVID-19 pandemic. Additional to a lack of progress on debt negotiation a 2020 law passed due to the COVID-19 pandemic in Puerto Rico halted cutting service to clients who failed to pay their utility bills, this resulted in a decrease in the earnings of the agency.

Investigations by the office of the Comptroller revealed from 2010 to 2018 the AEE had mismanaged $192 million on projects without utility.

In March 2021 the AEE announced increase in electric bills for the next three months equivalent to an average of $12 more on clients bills. As part of the contract with LUMA Energy, the AEE has begun transferring funds to LUMA, including $128 million sent by April 2021.

PREPA has accumulated over $9 billion in debt. In the agency’s ongoing bankruptcy proceedings, a federal oversight board stated that it would be “impossible” for Puerto Rico to repay the $8.5 billion requested by bondholders. The bankruptcy case, which began after the territory declared its public debt unpayable in 2015 and officially filed for bankruptcy in 2017, has reportedly discouraged investment and hindered economic development.

In April 2025, the Puerto Rico Oversight Board announced that bondholders of the Puerto Rico Electric Power Authority had no active claims against the central government of the Commonwealth of Puerto Rico in the approximately $575 million US dispute.

In 2025, PREPA announced a new debt restructuring plan that reduces its debt from $10 billion to approximately $2.6 billion. The plan requires that PREPA maintain its existing contracts with private energy operators LUMA Energy and Genera PR. It also includes new bond issuances and alternative funding mechanisms designed to limit electricity rate increases.

== Gallery ==
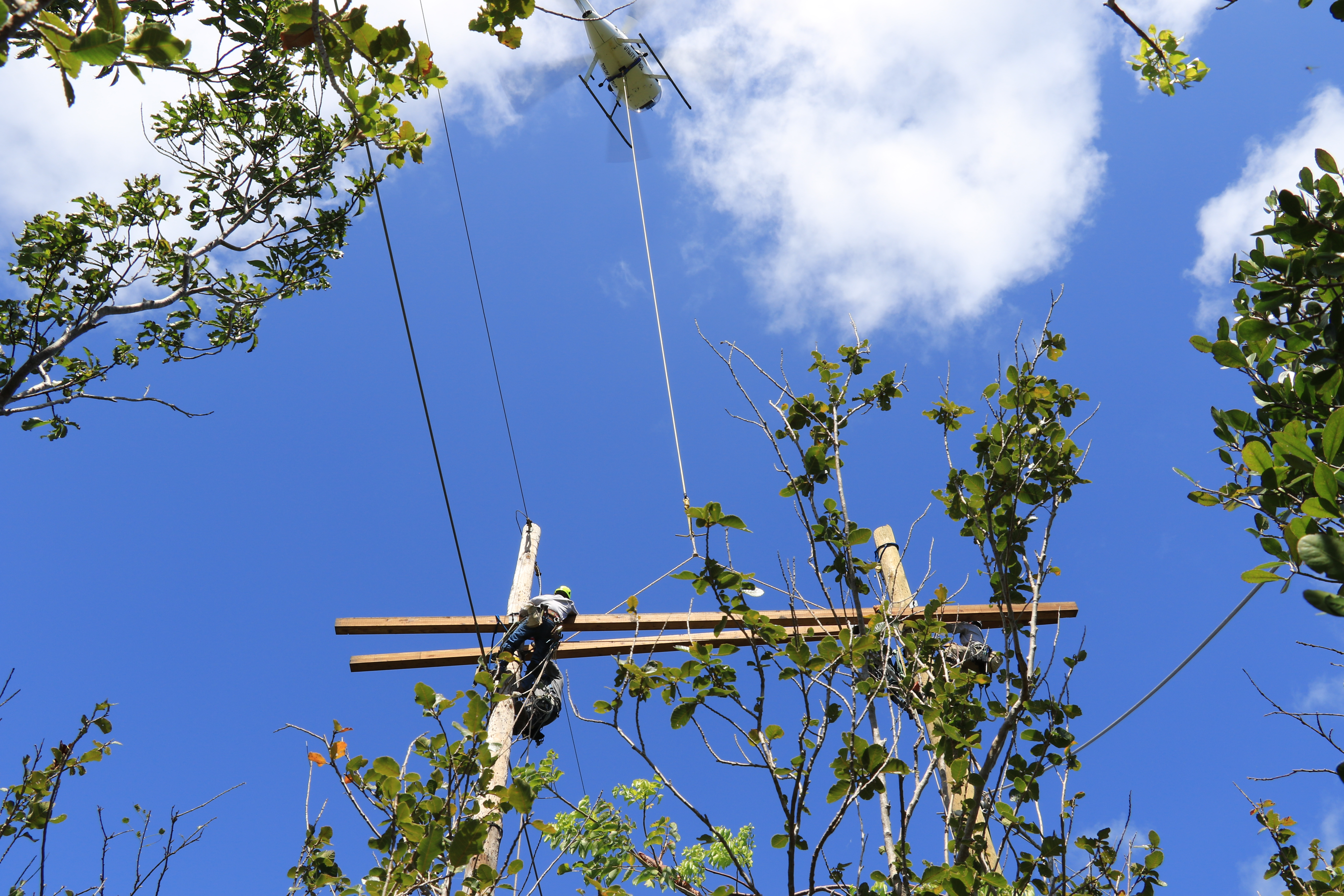
Critical electrical grid infrastructure of Costa Sur in the Guánica State Forest

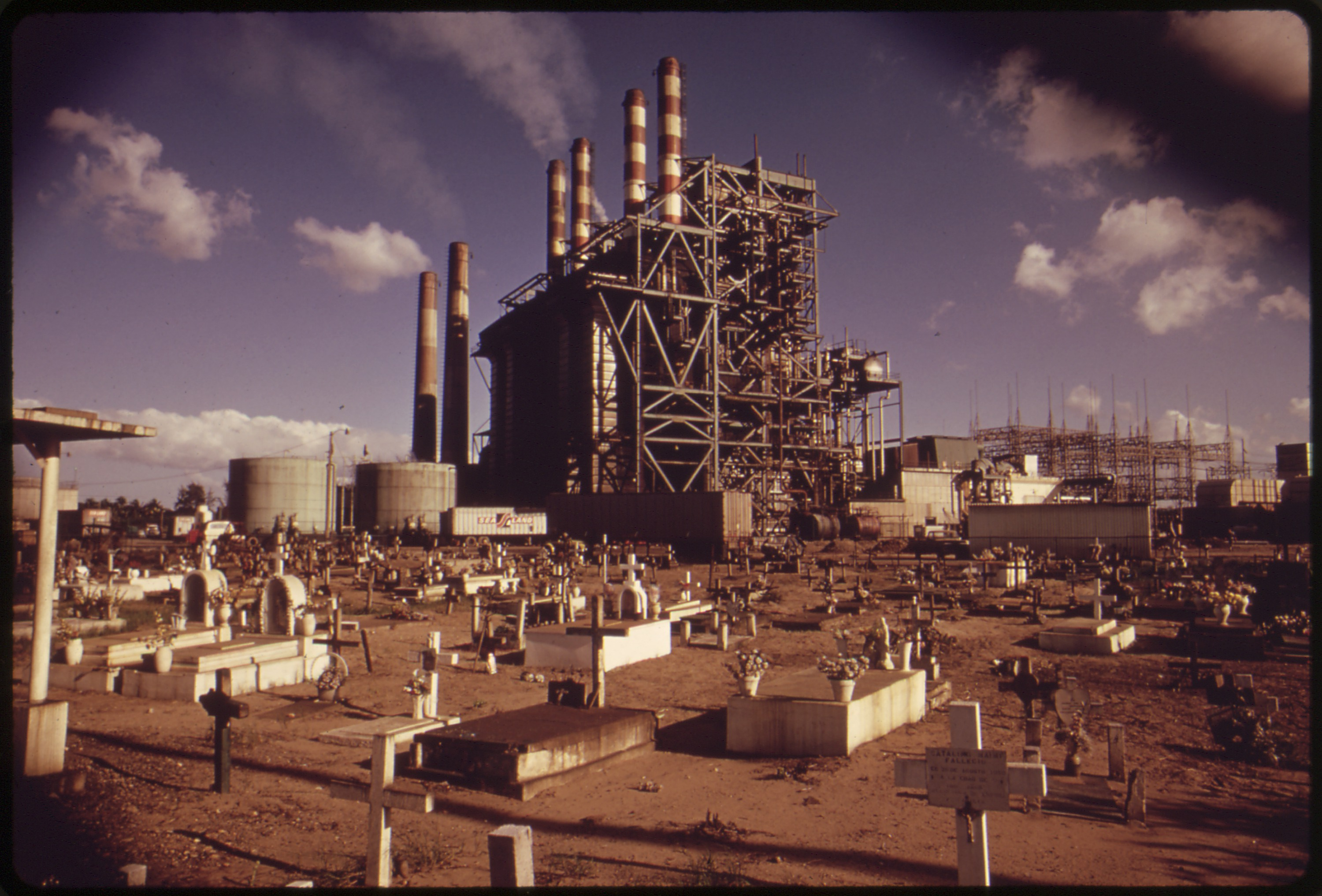
Palo Seco Power Plant, 1973. Photo by John Vachon.

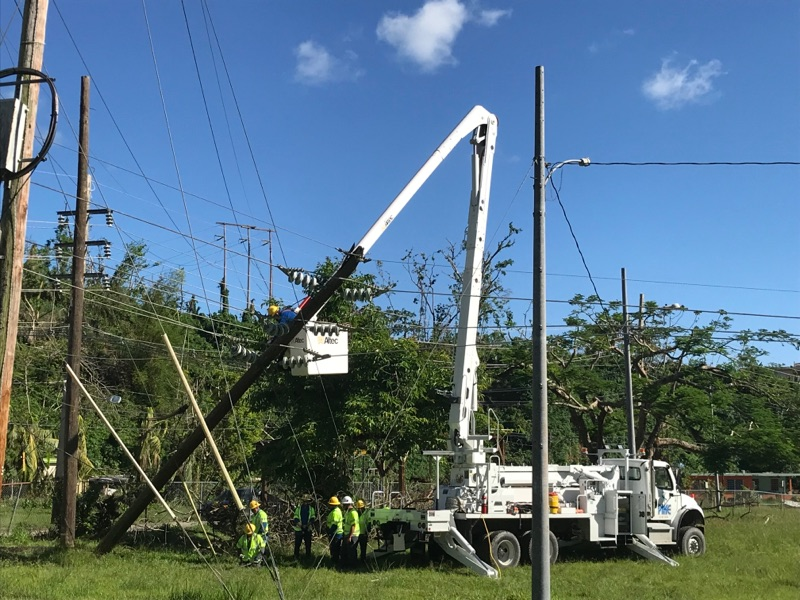
Western Area Power working for USACE, transferring the conductors from the damaged 38-kV transmission pole November 2017

== See also ==
- Energy in Puerto Rico
