= Casa Pueblo =

Puerto Rican non-profit environmental organization

- Formation: 1980
- Headquarters: Adjuntas, Puerto Rico
- Executive Director: Alexis Massol González
- Website: www.casapueblo.org

Casa Pueblo is an environmental community organization in Adjuntas, Puerto Rico, headed by Alexis Massol-González, a civil engineer and winner of the 2002 Goldman Environmental Prize. His son, Arturo Massol Deyá, a professor of Microbiology and Ecology at the University of Puerto Rico at Mayagüez, is the assistant executive director of Casa Pueblo.

Through voluntary participation of individuals and groups, its mission is to explore, enjoy, and protect the wild places in Puerto Rico; to practice and promote the responsible use of the land's ecosystems and resources; to educate and enlist others to protect and restore the quality of the natural and human environment; and to use all lawful means to carry out these objectives, particularly in line with principles of radical democracy, community self-management, and anti-colonialism.

== History ==
The organization was established in 1980 as a cultural center named Taller de Arte y Cultura (Art and Culture Workshop). In 1985, the organization acquired a house that was converted into a headquarters for the group and as a non-governmental, independent, self-supporting, community cultural center. The house was used as a cultural center, with a meeting and expositions hall, library, carts shop, butterfly garden and museum hall, running on solar energy. The cultural center was named Casa Pueblo, a name eventually adopted by the environmental organization itself. The organization has a radio station, with environmental and cultural programming; it opened an environmental school in August 2013.

== Ideology ==
Casa Pueblo has official policies on many conservation issues. They group these into 17 categories: agriculture, biotechnology, energy, environmental justice, forest and wilderness management, global issues, government and political issues, land management, military issues, nuclear issues, oceans, pollution and waste management, precautionary principle, transportation, urban and land use policies, water resources, and wildlife conservation.

Casa Pueblo advocates for public investment in wind, solar, and other renewable energy; for the creation of green jobs and efficient energy use; and against the development of new destructive mining projects.

They believe in principles of radical democracy, community self-management, and indigenous-centered anti-colonialism. Some have compared the goals of Casa Pueblo to those of the neo-Zapatistas and the Rebel Zapatista Autonomous Municipalities.

== Achievements ==
Some of the achievements of Casa Pueblo are:

- In the early 1990s, successfully stopped gold mining operations in the Adjuntas area after a decade long opposition battle against the 2020 Plan, which activists accused of supporting ethnic cleansing.
- In 1989, it began production of its own coffee cooperative, Madre Isla Coffee, via a self-sufficient coffee farm maintained by community members and outside volunteers.
- Lobbied in the Government of Puerto Rico for the creation of the community-sponsored forest in the Puerto Rican mountain region called Bosque del Pueblo, the only forest in Puerto Rico managed under an agreement between the government and a community-based organization.
- In 1995, the group also purchased Bosque del Pueblo, a 737-acre nature conservation area.
- In 2003, Casa Pueblo opened the Communitarian Institute of Biodiversity and Culture, which offers high school level courses, undergraduate courses during summer, environmental workshops and alternative programs with a couple stateside universities.
- In 2012, the organization successfully lobbied against the Vía Verde project., ending the government's plan to run a gas pipeline through sensitive areas of Puerto Rico's interior.
- In 2013, it inaugurated the "Escuela Bosque", a school for training in environmental issues, problems, and solutions.
- On 31 March 2013, Casa Pueblo successfully lobbied the Government of Puerto Rico for the establishment of the "Corredor Ecológico del Bosque Modelo", a conglomerate of model virgin forests in central Puerto Rico.
- Since 1999, Casa Pueblo has installed more than 1,000 solar panels in Adjuntas, Puerto Rico, to establish energy independence via democratic community-owned cooperative management, to weather the effects of energy privatization and natural disasters. The microgrids under this project support more than 350 homes and local businesses.
  - After Hurricane Maria hit the area on 20 September 2017, the island was left without power. Casa Pueblo became an "energy oasis" as the sole energy provider of Adjuntas where people came to connect their life-saving equipment, and they distributed 10,000 solar lamps to members of the community. Many mainstream politicians praised Casa Pueblo's role in supporting the community in lieu of a functioning energy grid, although Casa Pueblo had been a strong critic of energy privatization.
  - After Hurricane Ian in 2022, Casa Pueblo and its radio station, Radio Casa Pueblo, operational since 1999, continued to advocate on the importance of solar energy for Puerto Rican communities, especially those in the Cordillera Central.
- Casa Pueblo has planted over 30,000 trees in line with indigenous practices, as part of reforestation efforts.

== Campaigns ==
The organization has been involved in the following campaigns:

- 1980–1995: Fight Against Mining
- 1996: Community Management
- 1999: Biological Alley Act (Ley Corredor Biológico)
- 1999: New Biological Reserves and Country-wide Community Agreements
- 2003: Law 268: Funds for the Acquisition y Preservation of Lands with High Ecological Value
- 2004: La Olimpia Forest and New Community Management Agreement
- 2004: Plan for the Preservation of Sensitive Areas for Adjuntas and Adjacent Municipalities
- 2005–2006: Puerto Rican Preservation for the Biosphere of the "Tierras Adjuntas"
- 2006–2013: Via Verde project

== Honors ==
- In 2009, the Instituto de Cultura Puertorriqueña, an agency of the Government of Puerto Rico, recognized Casa Pueblo's contribution to Puerto Rican culture with a poster that announced a weekend event dedicated to Casa Pueblo.
- On 21 April 2012, Plaza del Caribe duplicated a bonsai version of Casa Pueblo's typical Puerto Rican country house that serves as its headquarters, as well as its butterfly farm and its Radio Casa Pueblo radio station (WOQI 1020AM) during Plaza del Caribe's Week of the Environment.
- In 2013, Casa Pueblo's Bosque del Pueblo (aka "Tierras Adjuntas") received the "Model Forest Award" from the International Model Forest Network, the only one of two such forests in Puerto Rico out of 20 forests total.
- On 23 May 2013, the Puerto Rico Legislature passed a joint resolution of support to Casa Pueblo for UNESCO to declare Bosque del Pueblo a World Heritage Site.

== See also ==
- Conservation Movement
- Ecology
- Environmental education
- Environmental movement
- Habitat conservation
- List of environmental organizations
- Natural environment
- Nature
- Recycling
- Sustainability
- Timeline of environmental events
