= Energy in Puerto Rico =

Energy in Puerto Rico primarily relies on imported fossil fuels, resulting in high electricity costs and vulnerability to natural disasters. The centralized grid has faced persistent reliability problems, with hurricanes such as Maria (2017) and Fiona (2022) causing prolonged blackouts. While Puerto Rico has set a goal of 100% renewable energy by 2050, progress remains slow, with renewables accounting for only 6% of generation in 2022.

Historically, Puerto Rico’s energy sector evolved from private companies to government control under the Puerto Rico Electric Power Authority (PREPA). The 2017 hurricanes exposed the grid’s fragility, prompting increased federal involvement and a shift toward modernization. In 2021, LUMA Energy took over transmission and distribution.

Efforts to improve energy security include renewable energy investments, grid upgrades, and storage solutions. However, financial instability, regulatory delays, and extreme weather continue to challenge Puerto Rico’s transition to a more resilient and sustainable energy system.

== History ==
In recent years, Puerto Rico's energy sector has undergone change, notably in modernizing its electric grid and transitioning to green energy. The island has historically relied on imported fossil fuels for energy production, leading to high electricity costs and vulnerability to price fluctuations.

Energy production and distribution in Puerto Rico has switched between private enterprises and government-controlled entities as the island tries to transition from fossil fuels to renewable energy sources.

=== Early years ===
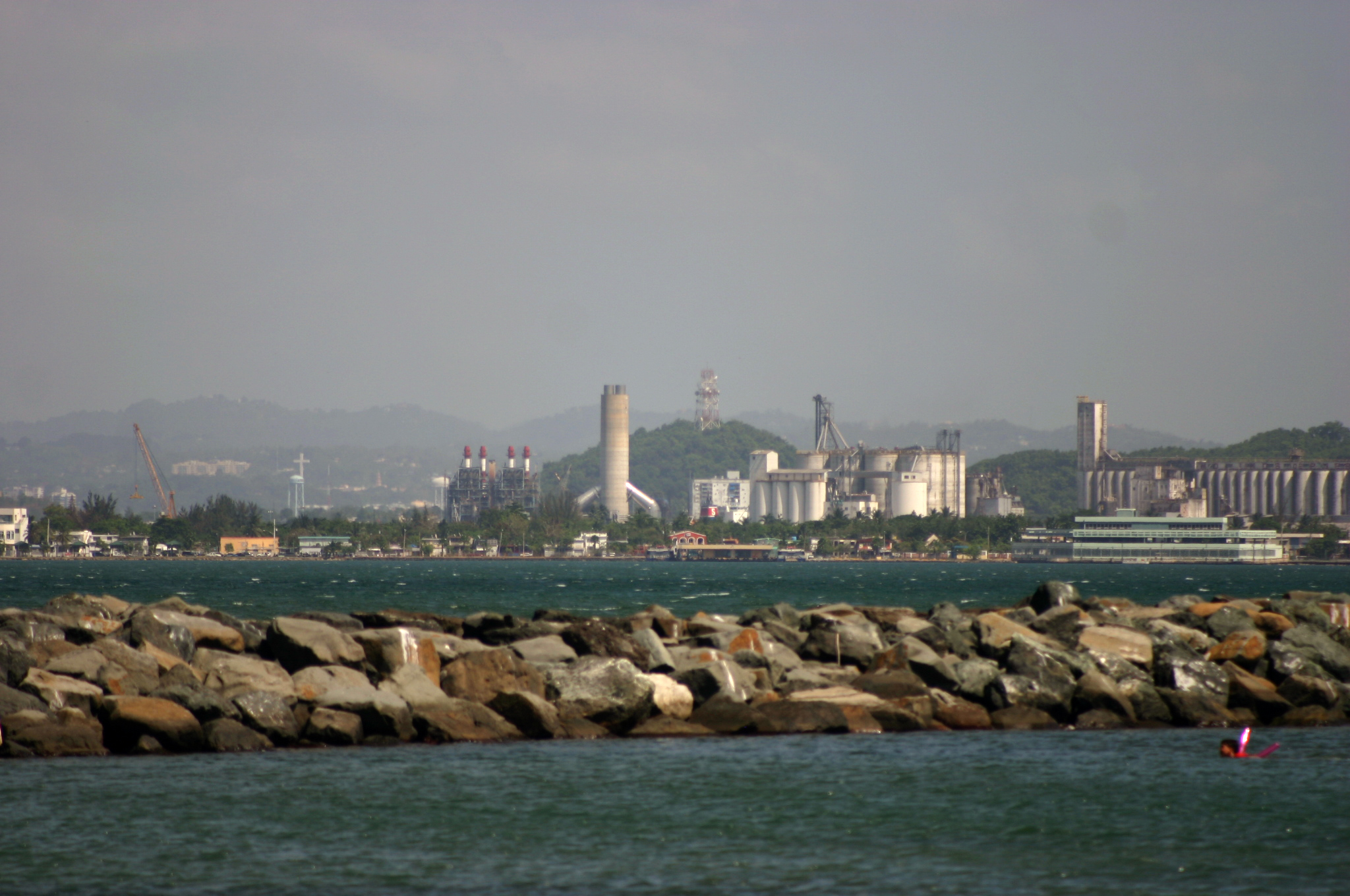
Puerto Rico Electric Power Authority

Electric lighting was first introduced in Puerto Rico in March 1893 by José Ramón Figueroa y Rivera in Villalba. Later that year, the Sociedad Anónima de Luz Eléctrica (SALE) established the first system in San Juan. From 1893 to 1915, private companies and foreign investment, particularly from Canadian firms, drove the expansion of electric service through the Puerto Rico Railway Light and Power Company.

Public involvement began with the 1908 Irrigation Act, which led to the construction of government-owned hydroelectric plants. In 1915, the government started using irrigation reservoirs to generate and distribute electricity. Carite 1 became the first publicly owned hydroelectric facility. In 1941, the River Sources Authority was created to consolidate water and energy management.

The industrial growth of the 1950s increased electricity demand, leading to a shift from hydroelectric power. By 1979, 98% of electricity came from oil and its derivatives, with only 2% from hydro sources. That year, the River Sources Authority was renamed the Puerto Rico Electric Power Authority (PREPA), which remains in operation.

=== 1980s-1990s ===
Economic and political changes in the 1980s significantly reshaped Puerto Rico’s energy sector, influencing both consumption patterns and legislative priorities.

During the decade, the energy sector significantly changed. In 1980, Puerto Rico switched from gallons to liters as units for gasoline sales, due to gas prices in the U.S. going over a dollar per gallon. Electricity consumption dipped to its lowest levels in 1982, reaching 10.34 billion kilowatt-hours. This was influenced by global economic challenges and oil price instability following the 1970s energy crises. That same year, the Puerto Rico Electric Power Authority Act was amended on May 12 by Act No. 46, as part of a series of legislative changes to the original 1941 law.

Electricity consumption increased throughout the 1990s as economic development and industrialization progressed, driving demand for household appliances and air conditioning. During this time, consumption of gasoline went down, reaching its lowest point at 19.94 thousand barrels per day in 1999.

=== 2000s to present ===
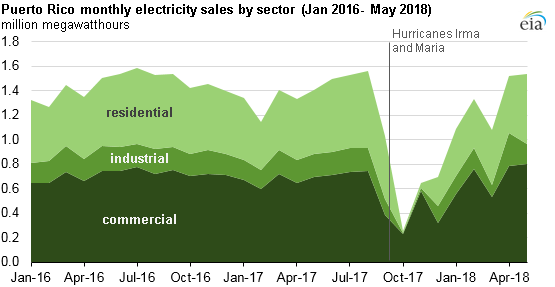
Hurricanes Irma and Maria reduced the availability of electricity throughout Puerto Rico.

Since the early 2000s, Puerto Rico’s energy sector has experienced rapid growth in consumption, shifts in fuel use, and increasing policy attention to diversification and renewable energy.

In the early 2000s, Puerto Rico’s energy use grew rapidly. Gasoline consumption rose to 83,000 barrels per day in 2003, four times higher than in 1999, while electricity use peaked at 23.47 billion kilowatt-hours in 2006.

A 2001 U.S. energy policy under President Bush included provisions for Puerto Rico focused on diversification and renewables. In 2011, a federal task force recommended increasing renewable energy, improving efficiency, and revising energy regulations.

Hurricanes Irma and Maria in 2017 caused widespread power outages, exposing weaknesses in the fossil fuel-based grid. The U.S. Department of Energy supported efforts to improve grid resilience.

Puerto Rico passed the Energy Public Policy Act in 2019, aiming for 100% renewable electricity by 2050 and phasing out coal by 2028. After Hurricane Fiona in 2022, grid modernization became a priority. By 2023, gasoline and electricity use had declined due to economic and demographic changes, and improved efficiency.

In 2025, a proposal to repeal the renewable targets and extend coal use drew criticism from environmental and health groups.

== PREPA issues ==
Puerto Rico’s energy system has faced long-standing challenges, including decades of underinvestment, aging infrastructure, and the effects of natural disasters. The Puerto Rico Electric Power Authority (PREPA), the publicly owned utility, has struggled to maintain and modernize the grid, which relies on outdated power plants and substations. Prior to Hurricane Maria in 2017, the system was already in poor condition.

When Hurricane Maria, a Category 4 storm, struck in September 2017, it caused widespread destruction and led to the longest blackout in U.S. history, with some areas experiencing outages for nearly a year. The disaster highlighted the system’s vulnerability, which was the result of systemic neglect rather than the hurricane alone. Failures in one part of the grid could lead to cascading outages.

PREPA has also faced allegations of corruption and financial mismanagement. After the hurricane, Congress investigated claims that officials had accepted bribes. Poor financial decisions, including deferred maintenance and attempts to cover budget gaps, contributed to the utility’s growing debt. These issues were part of the broader financial crisis that led Puerto Rico to declare bankruptcy in 2017. PREPA alone owed more than $9 billion, with a proposed bondholder settlement reaching $8.5 billion—an amount a federal oversight board stated was unaffordable for the island.

In response, the oversight board proposed a revised fiscal plan offering creditors $2.6 billion, avoiding rate increases due to already high electricity costs and the fragile grid. The board’s executive director, Robert Mujica Jr., said that revenue should be used to strengthen the energy system, and that meeting the $12 billion demand from bondholders could require an increase in electricity rates that residents could not afford.

A 2019 law set a target for Puerto Rico to transition to 100% renewable energy by 2050, but progress has been slow due to various obstacles. LUMA Energy, a private company from the U.S. and Canada, assumed control of transmission and distribution in 2021. The company has faced criticism over ongoing outages and high bills, though many of the system’s problems predate its involvement. LUMA officials have stated that modernizing the grid will take time and that they are committed to increasing renewable energy integration.

=== PREPA leadership ===
In early 2025, engineer Josué Colón Ortiz was appointed as Puerto Rico’s energy policy coordinator, a position that gives him broad authority over the island’s power system. His responsibilities include oversight of the Public-Private Partnerships Authority, LUMA Energy, and Genera PR. A long-serving member of the Puerto Rico Electric Power Authority (PREPA), Colón previously led the agency as executive director and worked on projects aimed at modernizing the grid using natural gas and renewable energy sources.

Colón’s role involves managing the island’s energy recovery efforts, coordinating with federal agencies such as FEMA and COR3, overseeing infrastructure improvements, and reviewing the contract with LUMA Energy. His leadership has been marked by both initiatives and controversy. A 2020 audit by the Puerto Rico Office of the Comptroller criticized the management of several PREPA capital projects during his tenure, citing contract irregularities, poor documentation, and unproductive spending totaling at least $85 million. These included the canceled Vía Verde pipeline and incomplete power plant conversions. Colón defended the projects, stating they were intended to reduce costs and meet environmental rules.

In 2025, he proposed using offshore LNG barges to address power shortages, a plan that was later dropped in favor of land-based generation. He also supported extending coal-fired power generation through 2035, contrary to a legal mandate to phase out coal by 2028. This position aligned with legislative efforts to revise renewable energy goals and drew criticism from environmental and public health advocates.

Colón has publicly criticized LUMA Energy for inefficiency and called for the termination of its 15-year contract, though the company has denied any formal violations. His disagreements with LUMA reflect broader public dissatisfaction with the privatization of Puerto Rico’s energy sector and the pace of its energy transition.

== LUMA Energy takeover ==
Under the current arrangement, PREPA retains ownership of assets, LUMA Energy operates transmission and distribution, and Genera PR runs generation facilities.

On June 1, 2021, LUMA Energy took over the operation of Puerto Rico’s electric grid under a public-private partnership aimed at reducing costs, improving resilience, and expanding renewable energy. LUMA, a joint venture between Quanta Services, Inc. and Canadian Utilities Limited, assumed responsibility for the transmission and distribution system from PREPA, which retained ownership of the assets.

The 15-year contract will officially begin once PREPA exits Title III bankruptcy. LUMA does not own the grid infrastructure or power generation assets.

Hurricane Maria caused $9.7 billion in damage in Puerto Rico, prompting LUMA to make permanent repairs to the island's electrical grid. Additional damage from Hurricane Fiona (2022) and Tropical Storm Ernesto (August 2024) further strained the system, contributing to outages such as one in mid-June 2024.

=== Efforts to remove LUMA Energy ===
In April 2022, the Puerto Rico House of Representatives voted 29–16, with one abstention, to terminate the commonwealth’s contract with LUMA Energy following a prolonged blackout. Opposition to the measure came from members of the pro-statehood New Progressive Party. Governor Pedro Pierluisi opposed terminating the contract early, preferring to wait for the results of a Puerto Rico Energy Bureau investigation into the outage.

The criteria for terminating the contract are expected to take effect only after the Puerto Rico Electric Power Authority (PREPA) restructures its debt and the 15-year contract formally begins. PREPA has been in bankruptcy for seven years, with negotiations between the Fiscal Control Board and unsecured bondholders having been scheduled for September 2024.

=== Efforts to improve energy infrastructure ===
LUMA launched Puerto Rico’s Vegetation Clearing Initiative in September 2023, aiming to clear over 16,000 miles of powerlines, substations, and telecom sites within three years. This effort builds on the 3,300 miles already cleared since 2021. The initiative is projected to improve reliability by 15% in the first year and reduce outages by 35-45% by 2026.

As of January 2025, LUMA began upgrading more than 23 substations across Puerto Rico with a $620 million investment, benefiting over 650,000 customers. The Substation Modernization Initiative involves replacing key equipment and redesigning systems to improve reliability and resilience against storms. So far, eight transformers have been replaced at substations in Hato Rey, Bayamón, Río Piedras, San Juan, Trujillo Alto, Santa Isabel, and Aguada.

=== Integrated Resource Plan ===
In November 2024, LUMA submitted a resource plan to the Puerto Rico Energy Bureau, outlining strategies for the island’s energy needs over the next 20 years. The filing included four of ten possible scenarios considering factors such as demand growth, fuel prices, and infrastructure costs.

LUMA emphasized that the IRP is a broader Puerto Rico initiative rather than a company-specific plan, framing its role as a facilitator in long-term energy planning.

== Puerto Rico Energy Bureau ==
The Puerto Rico Energy Bureau (PREB) is an independent regulatory agency responsible for implementing energy policy in Puerto Rico. Its functions include monitoring utilities, setting electricity rates, and ensuring the delivery of reliable and transparent electric service.

PREB was created under Act 57-2014 as part of reforms to establish a more transparent and affordable energy system. Its main role is to regulate, monitor, and enforce the Government of Puerto Rico’s energy policies.

The bureau is led by commissioners with expertise in engineering, law, energy, and environmental regulation, supported by technical advisors and subject-matter experts. PREB operates independently of political influence and collaborates with local and federal entities, such as the U.S. Department of Energy and the Financial Oversight and Management Board for Puerto Rico.

== Controversies ==
In July 2025, Puerto Rico’s energy sector faced three overlapping controversies under the leadership of Josué Colón Ortiz. First, PREPA, still in bankruptcy and retaining control of customer revenues, allegedly withheld about $700 million in operational funding from private operators LUMA Energy and Genera PR, contributing to increased outage durations, delays in storm preparedness, and payment disputes with fuel suppliers. Second, Colón was linked to negotiations for a 15-year liquefied natural gas supply agreement between two subsidiaries of New Fortress Energy Inc., which the Puerto Rico Financial Oversight and Management Board criticized for unfavorable terms and potential conflicts of interest. Third, PREPA awarded a $500 million to $1 billion emergency generation contract to Florida-based Power Expectations LLC, which a court later blocked after a rival bidder alleged the winning company lacked the necessary technical, financial, and ethical qualifications. Amid these disputes, Colón initiated a formal process to terminate LUMA’s operating agreement, a move some critics viewed as politically motivated given the absence of a replacement operator.

== Current energy landscape ==
Puerto Rico relies mainly on imported fossil fuels for electricity. In 2022, petroleum made up 63% of the island’s power generation capacity, followed by natural gas (23%), coal (8%), and renewables (6%). This reliance has contributed to some of the highest electricity costs in the U.S., second only to Hawaii.

The island’s energy use is dominated by petroleum, which accounts for about 60% of total consumption, though usage per person is about half the U.S. average. Puerto Rico plans to phase out coal-fired power by 2028 as part of its transition to cleaner energy sources. The electric grid has suffered from decades of neglect, with widespread damage and outages following Hurricane Maria in 2017. Management of the grid shifted from PREPA to LUMA Energy in 2021.

Power reliability remains a major issue. Over 100 load shedding events occurred in 2024 due to inadequate or failing power generation. Load shedding involves cutting electricity to certain areas to prevent broader outages. Vegetation interference is the leading cause of service interruptions, responsible for more than half of outages on the island.

New Fortress Energy (NFE) has a contract with the Puerto Rican government until 2026 for the supply of liquefied natural gas to Puerto Rico.

== Renewable energy ==
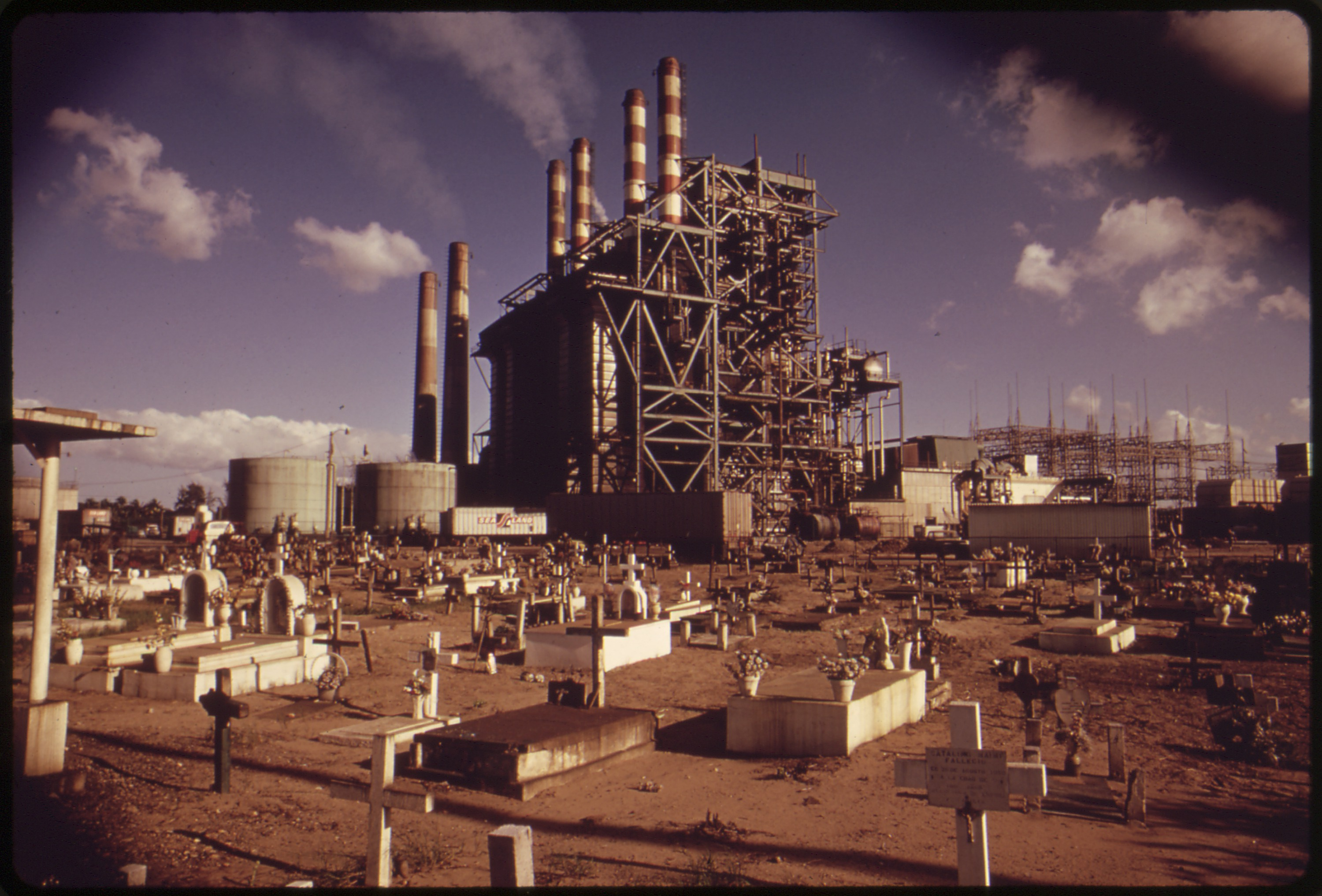
The Palo Seco electric power plant (near San Juan)

Puerto Rico has committed to transition to renewable energy, with a goal to meet 100% of its electricity needs with renewable energy by 2050. This transition is set by law in the Puerto Rico Energy Public Policy Act (Act 17), which sets interim targets of 40% renewable energy by 2025 and 60% by 2040.

In February 2025, LUMA Energy announced plans to add nearly 1 GW of renewable energy and over 700 MW of energy storage to reduce fossil fuel dependence and improve grid reliability. The $4 billion private investment is expected to generate over 4,200 construction jobs and 139 permanent positions.

LUMA’s agreement with Linxon US and AtkinsRéalis Caribe includes developing nine “energy interconnection points” as part of Puerto Rico’s transition to renewables. The project aims to lower costs for consumers by reducing reliance on fossil fuels and minimizing power outages.

== See also ==
- Economy of Puerto Rico
- Puerto Rico
- Puerto Rico Electric Power Authority
