= Alexis Massol González =

Puerto Rican environmentalist

- Born: Adjuntas, Puerto Rico
- Education: University of Puerto Rico at Mayagüez
- Occupations: Engineer, conservationist, political activist
- Known for: Preservation efforts of Bosque del Pueblo; Recipient of the Goldman Environmental Prize
- Spouse: Tinti Deyá Díaz
- Children: Ariel Massol Deyá, Arturo Massol Deyá.

Alexis Massol González is a civil engineer and environmentalist from Puerto Rico. He graduated in civil engineering in University of Puerto Rico at Mayagüez in 1965 and was awarded the Goldman Environmental Prize in 2002 for his efforts on the protection of Puerto Rico's mountain forests due to threats from mining interests. In 1980 he and his wife Tinti Deyá Díaz established Casa Pueblo, a non-profit environmental watchdog community-based organization in Adjuntas. One of the organization's achievements was protecting the forest surrounding their town by establishing Bosque del Pueblo in 1996. It was the first community-managed forest in Puerto Rico. A book he authored, Casa Pueblo: A Puerto Rican Model of Self-Governance, published in 2022, "offers a chronological account of Casa Pueblo’s evolution from a small group of concerned citizens to an internationally recognized model for activism."
