= Vía Verde project =

Failed proposed pipeline to supply natural gas to northern Puerto Rico

Vía Verde pipeline

Location
- Country: Puerto Rico
- Direction: south–north
- Start: Peñuelas (removed)
- Passes through: Guayanilla,(removed); Adjuntas,(removed); Utuado,(removed); Arecibo, Barceloneta, Manati, Vega Baja, Vega Alta, Dorado, Toa Baja, Bayamon, Cataño, Guaynabo
- To: San Juan

General information
- Type: Natural gas
- Owner: Government of Puerto Rico
- Operator: Autoridad de Energía Eléctrica (AEE)
- Contractors: Skanska
- Construction started: Project halted due to popular environmental opposition
- Expected: 2011

Technical information
- Length: 100 mi (160 km)
- Diameter: 24 in (610 mm)

The Vía Verde project (English: Green Way project), also known as Gasoducto del Norte (English: Northern Gas Pipeline), was a pipeline project proposed by the administration of Governor Luis Fortuño intended to supply natural gas to northern Puerto Rico from Puerto Rico's southern region. The pipeline would have run from Peñuelas, on Puerto Rico's southern coast, to electricity-generating plants in Arecibo, Cataño and San Juan, crossing the island's Cordillera Central. The project aimed to supply 71% of Puerto Rico's electrical energy needs, while lowering the cost of electricity in the island. A project of Governor Luis Fortuño, it was called the "crown jewel" project of his administration. The project was also supported by former governor of Puerto Rico Rafael Hernández Colón. The pipeline was called "the centerpiece of [Governor Fortuño]'s efforts to kick-start Puerto Rico's dormant economy."

The Gasoducto del Norte project faced stiff opposition from the public, environmentalists – including Casa Pueblo and Bill McKibben – and members of the United States Congress, including Congressman Luis Gutierrez. A Puerto Rico newspaper poll taken in March 2011 showed that 70% of the residents opposed the gas pipeline.

As of 21 March 2012, the government of Puerto Rico was still awaiting permission from the U.S. Army Corps of Engineers before commencing construction of the projected pipeline. If construction was started, the government estimated the project would take 12 months to complete, but the time estimate was called "fiction" even by members if his own political party.

On 15 June 2012, the government of Puerto Rico removed from the project the section of the pipeline that would have traversed from Peñuelas to Arecibo. The decision was based on data that indicated there would not be enough gas at Peñuelas to feed into the pipeline. This pipeline section would have cut through the Cordillera Central and was the primary focus of environmentalists' objections.

After much opposition, on 11 October 2012, the Puerto Rico Electric Power Authority (AEE) withdrew the entire Vía Verde permit application from the U.S. Army Corps of Engineers evaluation process, thereby stalling approval of the proposed pipeline indefinitely.

== History ==
=== 1993–2009 ===
In 1993, the chairman of the Puerto Rico Electric Power Authority (AEE), Miguel Cordero, proposed a natural gas pipeline as part of the Government of Puerto Rico's plan to diversify Puerto Rico's energy sources. However, the proposal was not proceeded during the administration of the Partido Nuevo Progresista (PNP) governor Pedro Rosselló (1993–2000). In 2001, the Popular Democratic Party of Puerto Rico (PPD) won the gubernatorial elections, put Sila Calderon in La Fortaleza from 2001 to 2004, and appointed Héctor Rosario as executive director of the AEE. The pipeline plan proposed by Cordero was shelved. In 2005, a natural gas pipeline project named Gasoducto del Sur (English: Southern Gas Pipeline) started construction under the PPD administration of Aníbal Acevedo Vilá. The Gasoducto del Sur pipeline would have transported natural gas from the EcoEléctrica facilities in Peñuelas to the power plant at Aguirre in Salinas. Acevedo Vilá managed to complete about 25% of the Gasoducto del Sur project before being defeated by the opposing party, the PNP, in the 2008 elections. When the PNP took back La Fortaleza in 2009 via Luis Fortuño as governor, Miguel Cordero was reappointed executive director of the AEE, and the Gasoducto del Sur project, though a quarter of its way completed, was abruptly cancelled. The cancellation left the Government of Puerto Rico with a US$59 million debt to the contractor, Skanska, and opened the way for the PNP's alternative project, Gasoducto del Norte.

=== 2010 ===
On 19 September 2010, Casa Pueblo held a peaceful march against the Gasoducto project. Another march took place on 1 May 2011, where the governor's opposition party, the PPD, showed their opposition to the project. More than 30,000 people marched the 1 May March.

In December, 2010, the U.S. Environmental Protection Agency and the U.S. Fish and Wildlife Service recommended the U.S. Army Corps of Engineers not to issue a permit for the construction of the Via Verde project.

=== 2011 ===
On 11 June 2011, a group of environmentalists from Casa Pueblo, National Puerto Rican Coalition, Sierra Club, Earth Justice and Greenpeace presented their opposition to the project in Washington, DC.

On 29 September 2011, Illinois Congressman Luis Gutierrez formally requested that President Barack Obama investigate the project citing "serious concerns over the existence of a 'close relationship' between the [Request for Comments|RFC] solicitor and its agents and the consultants who review and present formal comments about the Via Verde permit applications" to the Government, as well as an over concerns that Governor Luis Fortuño was using his influence to intervene in favor of the project when he asked to speak to the U.S. Secretary of the Department of the Interior, Ken Salazar, about Via Verde "in a process that its already following its course and which did not correspond him to intervene."

On 5 October 2011, AEE started the process of land expropriation, "even though the Puerto Rico government does not yet possess the necessary permits [from the Federal authorities] for the construction of the Gasoducto."

=== 2012 ===
On 19 February 2012, a crowd numbering about 6,000 persons held a march in the capital city of San Juan, Puerto Rico, to protest the construction of Gasoducto del Norte, a.k.a. Via Verde. Simultaneous with the demonstration in San Juan, another demonstration was held in New York City with the same purposes.

On 11 March 2012, a block of concerned citizens set up a permanent encampment in front of the northern electric generating plant at Palo Seco, one of those that would receive gas from the planned Gasoducto, to protest the planned gas pipeline.

On 30 May 2012, the Puerto Rico Senate started hearings on the Gasoducto del Norte and claims that it is not "the only alternative" to reduce the cost of electricity in Puerto Rico.

On 11 October 2012 AEE officially withdrew the entire Vía Verde permit application from the U.S. Army Corps of Engineers evaluation process, thereby stalling approval of the proposed pipeline indefinitely.

== Route ==
The proposed pipeline would distribute natural gas from the Costa Sur Sugar Plantation (Peñuelas/Guayanilla area) north to the Arecibo Cambalache plant, and on to the Palo Seco and San Juan areas. The proposed route would cut through Puerto Rico's Cordillera Central and the northern Karst region. It would cross 13 municipalities.

== Technical features ==
The pipeline was to be operated by AEE. The gas to be transported by the pipeline will be supplied by a single supplier, EcoElectrica.

The pipeline will have a diameter of 24 inches (610 mm). Its original length was planned to be 92 miles (148 km), but an October 2011 plan revision shows it may be changed to run closer to 100 miles. The Autoridad de Energía Eléctrica plans to convert several oil-fired plants to natural gas, starting with Costa Sur's units 5 and 6, which should be up and running December 2011. Subsequently, AEE plants at Cambalache, Palo Seco (units 3 and 4), and San Juan (units 5 through 10), will convert to natural gas, in phases that, as of August 2010, were scheduled to be completed by the end of 2011. According to documents from the U.S. Fish and Wildlife Service, the proposed route for the Gasoducto del Norte crosses 235 rivers and brooks, in addition to 1.4 million square meters of wetlands. Dr. Arturo Massol González, professor at the University of Puerto Rico, winner of the 2003 Goldman Environmental Prize, and director of Casa Pueblo, a community-based environmental watchdog organization in Puerto Rico, estimated that construction of the project would require the alteration of 8.2 million cubic meters of land.

== Controversies ==
A number of controversies surround this project. The administration of governor Luis G. Fortuño maintains that the Vía Verde Pipeline will supply the island with a cleaner energy source while at the same time reducing the cost of generating electricity by up to 30%. It has also estimated that Via Verde will reduce gas emissions by 60% while creating 5,000 direct and indirect jobs. Puerto Rico uses 36,000 GWh of electricity annually. Current cost for 1 million British thermal units (1.1 GJ) with petroleum burning is $12.25. With Vía Verde, the cost would be reduced to $5.15, according to government figures. But some have argued that politicians baptized the project as "Via Verde" (Green Way) to give the appearance that it is a good thing. Others, like Casa Pueblo founder Alexis Massol, have made reacted to the Via Verde (Green Way) name as a misnomer: "Vía Verde ... was rumored to be a gas pipeline, nothing green and nothing ecological" And some add that "everything about the project is wrong, beginning with Gov. Fortuño's Orwellian name for the pipeline – the 'Green Way' [Via Verde]." A 5 October 2011 report in La Perla del Sur, a Ponce, Puerto Rico, weekly, stated that high-ranking member of the political party that governor Luis Fortuno presides have broken ranks with the governor in favor of energy alternatives that are more efficient, less costly, and less intrusive on the environment.

=== Environmental impact ===
Some argue that "Via Verde" will negatively impact forest areas, hydrographic basins, lands fit for agriculture, and the all-important and endangered karstic region of northern Puerto Rico. It will also represent further dependence on another form of fossil fuel that, while less polluting than the current oil-based system of electricity generation, will still contribute to global warming. In January 2012, environmentalist Bill McKibben presented his support against the Via Verde project and compared it to the halted Keystone XL pipeline project. He stated, "Around the world, the fossil-fuel industry is carrying out its last desperate attempt to avoid the arrival of renewable energy and to ensure the existence of its dirty fuels. They seem to be using their standard strategy in Puerto Rico as well: to act quickly and with a minimum amount of review before the opposition has time to organize and bring out the truth."

The Government, on the other hand, contends that the only forest affected will be the Bosque de Vega Baja (English: Vega Baja Forest) where a 3.9-mile long trench will be carved. It also stated that the project will require the removal of 1.1 million cubic meters of land. The ex-head of the Puerto Rico Department of Natural Resources, Daniel Pagan Rosa, added that only one endangered species, the guabairo, will be affect by the construction of the pipeline. Pagan Rosa also added that the use of a Horizontal Directional Drilling will allow the construction of the pipeline "60 feet below the bottom of rivers." However, during an official interview in Ponce on 22 March 2011, the Government admitted it did not have an erosion and landslide control plan.

=== Cost of electricity ===
The government's projections of cost reduction for consumers are also under fire. AEE claims that there will be a 30% reduction in costs for electricity consumption. However, independent analysts estimate that this figure has been grossly exaggerated and that the real reduction in cost will be close to 18%, much, if not all of which, will be cancelled out by market fluctuations in the price of gas and by the government's need to cover the cost of construction of the project.

Some opponents, such as Puerto Rican PNP Senator Larry Seilhamer Rodríguez, argue that the project will not meet its primary objective of reducing electric rates to the Puerto Rican consumer: "One of the arguments of the Autoridad [de Energia Electrica] is that the cost of a kWh in Puerto Rico is 22 cents compared to the 22 coents cost in the United States. But if we consider what they plan to offer in the electric bill, we will see a reduction of 15 percent, which means that – instead of paying 22 cents per kWh – we will be paying 18 or 19 cents and that is totally ineffective, it is not competitive." The government's own data, from reports to the Puerto Rico electric company's to its stockholders, have confirmed that the pipeline will not reduce consumers electric bills.

Still, the government defends the project stating that "with today's technology, the cost to produce a kWh using renewable energy sources [such as solar or wind] is considerably more expensive than using traditional energy sources". However, on 21 December 2011, Autoridad de Energía Eléctrica, the government's Via Verde customer, admitted that Via Verde will not lower consumers' energy costs.

=== Cost of the project ===
The financing for the project is also under fire. Those opposing the project ask, "If the project will be so good financially, why is it that the Republican capitalistic administration of Governor Fortuño has not found a private investor to finance it?" And add that "the so-called capitalistic republicans now want to socialize the costs and privatize the profits." Pedro Jiménez, retired engineering professor at the University of Puerto Rico at Mayaguez, argued that "in the long run, the project will cost from two and a half to three times the currently project cost of the AEE of $445 millions." In January 2012, Casa Pueblo estimated that the cost of the project, considering payments to contractors of $800 million plus amortization over 30 years, will be $3 billion USD.

=== Proper infrastructure ===
According to officials at EcoEléctrica, gas output at their facilities will not provide enough natural gas to power generators beyond Costa Sur, the first gas-to-electric conversion unit in the path of the pipeline and located in the municipality of Penuelas.

Opponents argue that "building a pipeline when there is no gas, makes no sense" and are demanding that the government abandon the project altogether: the admission by a high-ranking officer of EcoEléctrica to La Perla del Sur is a decisive and unequivocal confirmation that what we have been stating for months.

=== Social effect ===
It has been estimated that construction of the pipeline will affect 51 communities, the campus of the University of Puerto Rico at Utuado, and church and gas station entrances potentially affecting some 22,000 families. The Government, however, states that the pipeline will be built at a prudent distance from communities. Yet community leaders at Casa Pueblo explain that the pipeline will be run alongside roads, including alongside the road in front of Levittown, a community of 30,000 residents, and the pipeline will run above ground in sections of PR-10, a road used by over 13,000 vehicles daily.

=== Safety concerns ===
In defense of the project, its senior environmental advisor, Daniel Pagan Rosa, stated that the pipeline's safety system will be more sophisticated than those traditionally built in the United States. He added that there will be two monitoring centers, one in Ponce, and one in San Juan's Monancillo area. He also maintained that the system will be built to permit switching back to petroleum should a major disaster affect the pipeline.

University of Puerto Rico at Mayaguez engineering professor Pedro Jiménez, expressed concerns over the safety of the project and its cost: "The pipeline will not be built to withstand a large earthquake, let alone [a tsunami] like Japan's." Commenting in the aftermath of the effects of Hurricane Irene in Puerto Rico, Jiménez said that "the project represents a time bomb." The Puerto Rico College of Surgeons, a professional organization covering all physicians licensed to practice in Puerto Rico, approved a motion of support for a report by its Committee on Environmental Resources which pointed at the Gasoducto del Norte as "a grave danger to public health." Also, the Puerto Rico director of the Caribbean Tsunami Alert Program, Crista Von Hillebrant, confirmed to a local news weekly that EcoElectrica – the only point of entry for the natural gas to be injected into the Gasoducto – was located in a tsunami risk zone.

Reportedly, the Governor was quoted as saying that in case of an earthquake in Puerto Rico, he would flee Old San Juan with his family and head to fort El Morro, to stay clear of potential explosions in the gas pipelines of Old San Juan.

=== Ethical issues ===
The Government's motivations with the project have been questioned by several prominent individuals and organizations. These revolve around accusations of governmental secrecy, maneuvering, manipulation, and conflict of interests. There have been accusations that Governor Luis Fortuño approved the projects to take place via a "fast-track" and that government agencies are charging forward with the project without the proper involvement of non-governmental parties. Nevertheless, the executive director of Puerto Rico's Office of Energy Affairs argues that "AEE has been very open with the people in discussing the project and that within the available alternatives the gas pipeline is the one that makes most sense.

In April 2012, Congressman Luis Gutiérrez Olmedo qualified the actions of the U.S. Army Corps of Engineers (USACOE) as corruption and asked that any evaluation related to the Gasoducto project be immediately halted: "[The USACOE] does not have the moral capacity to supervise any permit for the Gasoducto...they contaminated the process when the Government of Puerto Rico hired as an advisor BC Peabody, a firm whose director is the former director of the Jacksonville Office of the Corps of Engineers". He charged the Jacksonville Office with unethical practices and challenged the Office to react to the accusations.

==== Secrecy and lack of popular involvement ====
Despite the government's statements that the Gasoducto planning process is being done in a transparent manner, there are those who feel the Government of Puerto Rico is not being totally open when it comes to revealing exactly what it is doing to inform the public about the Gasoducto. Alexis Massol, director of Casa Pueblo, stated that "Mr. [Alfred A.] Pantano [head of the Jacksonville, Florida, U.S. Corps of Engineers office in change of reviewing the permit application from the Government of Puerto Rico,] ordered the transfer of the [U.S. Corps of Engineers] reviewing office from Puerto Rico to Florida [USA], provoking mistrust. When Mr. Pantano told the press that [constructing a] building has a greater impact than building a gas pipeline, such comment provoked suspicion. When Mr. Pantano hides information from other federal agencies regarding the [planned] existence of 20 other hidden valves for [the addition of] other branch pipelines, then he raises more suspicion, greater mistrust, and gives the appearance of a total fabrication." On 6 November 2011, Congressman Luis Gutierrez expressed having knowledge of contradictory statements coming out of Mr. Pantano's office which "raised great concern." On 11 November 2011, an investigation by the Ponce, Puerto Rico-based La Perla del Sur newsweekly found that allegations made to Noticentro by Governor Fortuño on 27 October (2011) which stated that it was necessary for his government to appropriate lands before qualifying for the permit by the U.S. Corps of Engineers (USCE) were denied by Barry Vorse, the spokesperson for the USCE. The director of Casa Pueblo complained that project consultants such as its head consultant Daniel Pagan Rosa, "continue lying about the permit process to save their [$30] million dollar contracts."

==== Governmental maneuvering ====
In May 2011, the regional Jacksonville, Florida, office of the U.S. Corps of Engineers took over from the local San Juan Corps of Engineers office the permits application for construction of the gas pipeline. The action was received with suspicion and criticized as having set a precedent in the way how the USACOE works, where local permits are always managed by the office closest to where the application for permit if to be granted.

==== Possible political manipulation ====
With the completion of the project initially set to occur just two months prior to Governor Fortuño's re-election bid in November 2012, National Public Radio has also wondered if the project may be politically motivated.

==== Alternatives ====
There have also been accusations that the government has not been forthcoming in its evaluations of alternatives to the gas pipeline. In February 2012, a marine engineer from Excelerate Energy stated that "there isn't a single impediment of significance, be it structural or economic, that would make it impossible for the electrical units on the north [shore of Puerto Rico] to connect to barges to receive natural gas...and anyone stating the opposite doesn't know what he is talking about." This is contrary to what government spokesmen Miguel Cordero López, ex-executive director of Autoridad de Energía Eléctrica, and Daniel Pagán Rosa, the government's lead advisor of the Vía Verde project, had been reporting "for the last 17 months." The fact that Excelerate Energy signed a contract to supply liquid-to-gas natural gas conversion barges to the Autoridad de Energía Eléctrica's southern unit at Aguirre, says Casa Pueblo founder Alexis Massol González, defeats the government's efforts to sell this "absurd" Gasoducto idea to the people. The government had claimed that off-shore barges were not a viable alternative. In an article titled Barcazas pueden sustituir Gasoducto del Norte (Barges can substitute Gasoducto del Norte) it was reported that barges are a viable alternative to the Gasoducto.

On 30 May 2012, the Puerto Rico Senate held hearings on the project and found that "the temporary transition to propane gas and the future delivery of natural gas via offshore vessels and submarine gas pipelines are viable alternatives, both from the technical as well as the financial perspectives", to the Gasoducto del Norte.

==== Conflict of interests ====
Congressman Luis Gutierrez has stated that the main contract for designing the pipeline has gone to a company which has admitted having no experience in designing gas pipelines and which is owned by "the skiing partner of the [sitting] governor of Puerto Rico, Luis Fortuño."

== See also ==
- Timeline of Gasoducto del Norte project. Jason Rodríguez Grafal. "Crónica de un proyecto manipulado." La Perla del Sur. Ponce, Puerto Rico. Year 30. Issue 1490. Pages 6–7. 20 June 2012. Retrieved 20 June 2012.)
- Video of Congressman Luis Gutierrez address before the U.S. Congress
