= Massangis Solar Park =

Photovoltaic power station in France

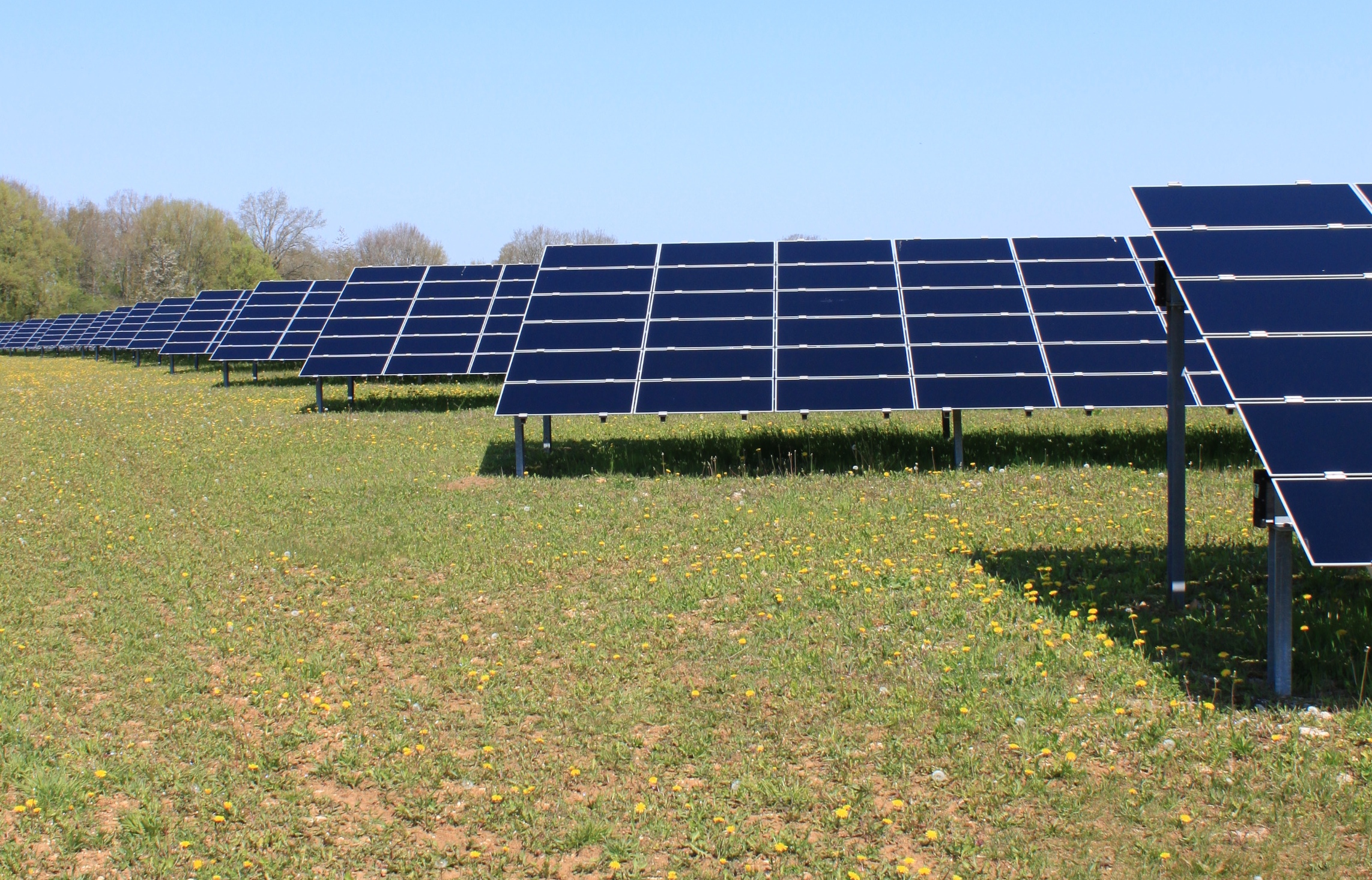
- Country: France
- Location: Yonne
- Coordinates: 47°36′40″N 4°00′37″E
- Status: Operational
- Construction began: 2010
- Commission date: 18 October 2012
- Owner: EDF Énergies Nouvelles

Solar farm
- Type: Flat-panel PV

Power generation
- Units operational: 700,000
- Nameplate capacity: 56 MW

External links
- Commons: Related media on Commons

The Massangis Solar Park is a 56 megawatt (MW) photovoltaic power station in France. It uses about 700,000 thin-film CdTe-panels made by First Solar. Commissioned in stages beginning in the spring of 2012.

== See also ==
- Photovoltaic power station
- List of photovoltaic power stations
