= Electrical Industry and Irrigation Workers Union =

Trade union in Puerto Rico

UTIER
- Unión de Trabajadores de la Industria Eléctrica y Riego
- Founded: May 3, 1942 (83 years ago)
- Headquarters: San Juan, Puerto Rico
- Members: 4,800
- Key people: Ángel R. Figueroa Jaramillo, Presidente; Freddyson Martínez Estévez, Vicepresidente; Miguel A. Nieves Ríos, Secretario-Tesorero
- Website: utier.org

The Unión de Trabajadores de la Industria Eléctrica y Riego (UTIER) —English: Electrical Industry and Irrigation Workers Union— is one of the labor unions that represents workers from the Puerto Rico Electric Power Authority. The union was founded on May 3, 1942 by thirty seven linemen in San Juan, Puerto Rico. At some point it was affiliated with the Free Federation of Workers and the American Federation of Labor and Congress of Industrial Organizations but it eventually unaffiliated and became independent. Today, the union represents about 4,800 workers.
