= Luma Energy =

Power company in Puerto Rico

- LUMA Energy, LLC.
- Nickname: LUMA
- Predecessor: Puerto Rico Electric Power Authority (PREPA)
- Formation: January 17, 2020; 6 years ago
- Founded at: San Juan, Puerto Rico
- Type: Joint venture
- Registration no.: 439372
- Legal status: Limited liability company
- Purpose: Electrical service provider
- Services: Electric power transmission and distribution
- Official language: English, Spanish
- Owner: Quanta Services; ATCO
- CEO & President: Jannise Quiñones
- Website: https://lumapr.com/
- Formerly called: LUMA Energy ManageCo, LLC.

Luma Energy is a private power company that is responsible for power distribution and power transmission in the Commonwealth of Puerto Rico. It is also in charge of maintaining and modernizing the power infrastructure. Previously, these duties belonged exclusively (according to the law) to the Puerto Rico Electric Power Authority (PREPA, Spanish Autoridad de Energía Eléctrica, AEE), but as of July 20, 2018, permission was granted for PREPA assets and service duties to be sold to private companies, and on June 22, 2020, a 15-year contract with Luma was signed, making Luma the new operator. The takeover occurred on June 1, 2021.

== Infrastructure and power grid ==
Following Hurricane Maria in 2017, which exposed longstanding weaknesses in Puerto Rico’s electric grid under PREPA, the government contracted Luma Energy, a private consortium, in 2021 to manage electricity transmission and distribution.

After taking over operations, Luma launched several infrastructure repair and upgrade initiatives. These included replacing over 17,000 utility poles and clearing vegetation along thousands of miles of power lines. To improve resilience, the company installed more than 17,850 hurricane-resistant poles and upgraded over 1,800 poles and critical distribution breakers.

As part of broader grid modernization efforts, Luma submitted 460 projects for Federal Emergency Management Agency (FEMA) funding, with 144 projects underway. FEMA has approved funding for eight major substation projects. Luma plans to prioritize substation and transmission work, implement preventive maintenance, and inspect 51 key transmission segments in fiscal year 2025. The company also aims to clear vegetation along 16,000 miles of power lines over four years.

To enhance monitoring and efficiency, Luma intends to add battery storage systems and replace 1.5 million electricity meters with smart meters over three years. In alignment with Puerto Rico’s energy policy, the company is developing nearly 1 GW of renewable energy and over 700 MW of storage, including nine renewable energy interconnection points. Luma has connected solar systems for 12,000 customers, added 50 MW of renewable capacity, and introduced a resource map for solar development.

Luma has overseen power restoration following severe weather events such as Hurricane Fiona in 2022 and Tropical Storm Ernesto in 2024. The company has emphasized its ongoing efforts to improve grid reliability and has reached an agreement with the electrical workers’ union to support workforce development through technical training programs.

In an August 2025 TV news interview, Luma executives described Puerto Rico’s electrical grid as “a very old system” that had been “neglected for decades” prior to the company assuming operations. The company said that reconstruction has been slowed down by insufficient and delayed federal funding, saying that the release of billions of dollars in FEMA funds has not kept pace with the work required. Luma said that even with full resources, restoring the grid to reliable condition would take an estimated five to ten years.

== History ==
Luma Energy was contracted to repair and modernize Puerto Rico’s electrical grid. The company has stated that the grid was outdated and poorly maintained, and that limited funding and delays in Federal Emergency Management Agency (FEMA) disbursements have hindered progress. The Puerto Rico Energy Bureau is reviewing Luma's proposed rate increases intended to raise additional funds. According to a Luma official, electric service has improved since the company assumed control, and the company is prepared for hurricane impacts. Luma estimates that completing necessary repairs would require five to ten years with adequate resources. The Governor of Puerto Rico has criticized Luma's performance and threatened to cancel its contract. Luma has said it remains committed to its work.

=== 2020-2021 ===
Registered on January 17, 2020, as Luma Energy ManageCo, LLC, the company was renamed Luma Energy, LLC on June 12, 2020. A joint venture between Quanta Services (USA) and ATCO (Canada), Luma was created to manage Puerto Rico’s power grid.

The contract under which Luma Energy operates the power grid in Puerto Rico was signed after a bid in 2020. In the bid, five different companies participated and only four submitted business proposals. The $1.5 billion contract is set to last for 15 years and can be renewed if both parties agree.

Luma Energy officially became the new operator for Puerto Rico's power grid on June 1, 2021. Luma is in charge of operating the distribution and transmission infrastructure, although they do not own it, nor do they own or operate the power generation sector. The takeover happened as part of an agreement with Puerto Rico's Public-Private Partnership Agreement in an effort to overcome PREPA's bankruptcy.

=== 2022-2025 ===
On June 1, 2022, Luma Energy completed its first year of operations in Puerto Rico, reporting changes in customer service, reliability, and progress on FEMA-funded projects. In November 2023, it hosted the IEEE Power and Energy Society conference in San Juan, the first time the event was held in Puerto Rico.

In February 2025, Luma announced plans to add nearly 1 GW of renewable energy and over 700 MW of storage, attracting $4 billion in private investment. That same month, the company reached an agreement with Linxon US LLC and AtkinsRéalis Caribe to build nine energy interconnection points, adding 990 MW of clean energy and 700 MW of storage to the grid.

Despite these developments, Luma continues to face challenges, including energy supply issues.

In 2022, a senior official with Luma testified before a U.S. House oversight hearing investigating Puerto Rico's power grid development and its post-disaster reconstruction. Amid criticism by some officials in Puerto Rico, such as energy czar Josué Colón Ortiz, the Luma official stated that since assuming responsibility in 2021, Luma has worked to enhance reliability and resiliency despite inheriting a grid weakened by years of neglect. In her testimony, she described Luma's response to Hurricane Fiona, noting that power was restored to 90 percent of customers within 12 days. She credited the company’s emergency operations center, the mobilization of 1,300 field workers, and a $130 million inventory of materials for supporting rapid recovery efforts. Addressing electricity rates, Bahramirad stated that Luma has never proposed an increase to the base rate for T&D operations, attributing past rate hikes to rising fuel costs managed by PREPA. She also outlined efforts to reduce outages through vegetation management, improved customer service, and faster response times.

Luma has advanced over 250 FEMA-funded infrastructure projects, representing more than $6 billion in federal investment, with 23 projects already under construction. The company is also collaborating with FEMA and other agencies to strengthen power generation.

On April 16, 2025, a transmission failure caused a blackout across Puerto Rico, cutting power to 1.4 million customers and water to over 400,000. Likely due to vegetation interference and equipment faults, the outage shut down all power plants and disrupted hospitals, airports, and other services. The incident caused traffic jams, business closures, and renewed criticism of grid operators Luma Energy and Genera PR.

== Renewable energy ==
On February 6, 2025, Luma Energy announced plans to expand Puerto Rico’s electric grid with nearly 1 gigawatt (GW) of renewable energy and over 700 megawatts (MW) of energy storage. The project involves more than $4 billion in private investment and is expected to generate approximately 4,200 construction jobs and 139 permanent positions.

As part of Puerto Rico’s Tranche 1 renewable energy procurement, Luma partnered with Linxon US to develop nine energy interconnection points to help integrate new renewable sources into the grid. The initiative supports Puerto Rico’s energy transition goals, including ending coal-fired electricity generation by 2028 and achieving a fully renewable energy grid by 2050.

Since taking over grid operations, Luma has connected solar panel systems for 12,000 customers, adding 50 MW of solar capacity to the system.

== Grid reliability and service stability ==
Luma Energy has undertaken several initiatives to improve Puerto Rico’s electrical grid. The company has replaced over 17,000 utility poles and cleared vegetation along approximately 4,800 miles (7,700 kilometers) of power lines and related infrastructure. It has also added thousands of automation devices as part of its grid modernization efforts.

In fiscal year 2025, Luma plans to inspect 51 line segments identified as contributing to a significant portion of transmission-related outages. Over the next four years, it aims to clear vegetation from 16,000 miles (25,700 kilometers) of power lines. Of the 460 grid reconstruction projects submitted to the Federal Emergency Management Agency (FEMA), 144 are currently under construction.

Luma intends to install additional battery energy storage systems and replace 1.5 million meters with smart meters within three years to improve detection of power losses. On February 6, 2025, the company announced plans to add nearly 1 gigawatt of renewable energy and over 700 megawatts of energy storage to enhance grid reliability. An agreement is in place to develop nine interconnection points to support renewable energy integration.

Despite these efforts, outages persist. In December 2024, a blackout affected over 1.2 million residents. Following Hurricane Fiona in September 2022, over 100,000 customers remained without power for two weeks. By October 2, 2022, Luma reported restoring service to about 1.34 million customers. After Tropical Storm Ernesto in August 2024, tens of thousands were still without power a week later, though officials stated that 96% of the population had service within three days.

Luma executives have acknowledged ongoing challenges, with a high rate of critical failures reported. CEO Juan Saca stated that over 95% of customers had continuous service more than 98% of the time, when power generation was available.

== Monacillos fire ==
On June 10, 2021, a fire at the Monacillos substation in Río Piedras triggered widespread power outages across Puerto Rico. The incident occurred shortly after Luma Energy took over the island’s power transmission and distribution system. According to the company, a transformer caught fire, activating protective systems and initially leaving between 700,000 and 800,000 customers without electricity. Investigations by state and federal authorities began shortly after the event, with preliminary findings indicating faulty equipment as a possible cause. Police and fire officials later ruled out foul play, suggesting that inadequate maintenance may have contributed to the fire.

The outage happened amid heightened public scrutiny of LUMA Energy. Critics questioned the company’s readiness and response, while LUMA pointed to longstanding weaknesses in the power infrastructure. Around the same time, the company’s digital systems experienced a cyberattack, which may have disrupted customer access to account information.

== Backlash, controversy and protests ==
=== Government contract ===
Luma Energy’s contract with Puerto Rico sparked controversy due to secrecy and lack of public input. It grants Luma control over key utilities, allows contract dissolution with 120 days’ notice, and includes broad termination clauses for disasters, war, sabotage, and civil unrest.

Luma Energy sought immunity from liability, including for negligence or willful harm, but the request was denied. Instead, NEPR upheld a liability clause similar to PREPA’s. The OIPC argued LUMA should use insurance to cover costs, while LUMA’s president claimed the request aimed to protect customers.

In October 2024, the Special Commission of the Puerto Rico Bar concluded that the contract, between the two agreements, violated fundamental legal principles, but also contributed to worsening the energy situation of Puerto Rico. The Special Commission of the Puerto Rico Bar recommends, a Litigation in nullity, or Resolution according to the contractual terms.

=== Sabotage allegations ===
Luma Energy reported sabotage, vandalism and a DDoS attack affecting its services. A substation fire was filmed and suspected as sabotage. Representative Jorge Navarro called for an investigation. On June 15, 2021, Luma warned of scammers posing as employees to collect payments fraudulently.

Luma launched a new online platform, but service failures followed. The company attributed the issues to excessive traffic, later citing a suspected DDoS attack that generated up to 2 million visits per second. The incident was under investigation as of June 2021.

=== Public reaction ===
Following Luma Energy’s takeover, protests erupted across Puerto Rico, involving former workers, UTIER, allied groups, and the public. Protestors sometimes blocked Luma premises, leading the company to sue UTIER and others on June 2, 2021, seeking to prevent intimidation and disruption. A court order on June 4 temporarily barred UTIER from blocking facilities but upheld free speech rights. The case was dismissed on June 18 due to insufficient evidence. Protests continued at LUMA sites, with employees physically blocked by demonstrators in multiple cities.

Since Luma's takeover on June 1, 2021, customers reported power surges damaging appliances. Voltage irregularities caused fires in two San Sebastián homes, prompting evacuations and repairs. Privatization may increase costs, despite already high rates. Rising costs are especially concerning given Puerto Rico’s declining economy and high poverty rates.

In November 2024, Puerto Rico’s Court of Appeals ruled against Luma Energy, upholding NEPR’s performance measurement system, which LUMA claimed violated its right to bonuses. Protestors questioned whether Luma would modernize the grid, but its president, Wayne Stensby, stated plans to incorporate renewable energy, though only 2.5% of Puerto Rico’s power came from renewables as of 2020. Luma LUMA faced criticism for inadequate staffing and long service delays. Customers reported three-hour phone wait times, broken web platforms, and slow power restoration—averaging 333 minutes under Luma versus 155 under PREPA.[68] Due to poor service, several municipalities declared emergencies in June 2021, hiring private contractors for repairs. Some mayors also provided aid for food and medication spoilage.

Lawmakers demanded improvements. Representative Luis Raúl Torres urged a 30-day deadline for Luma to fix deficiencies or face contract termination. Luma, with 2,200 employees instead of the 3,800 needed, pledged to improve service. Complaints also arose over estimated bills, leading Luma to request customer-submitted meter photos and plan upgrades for remote readings. LUMA also aimed to reduce call wait times to under five minutes by August 2021 through expanded staffing.

==== Severe weather ====
Critics have expressed concern about Luma Energy’s preparedness for severe weather events. Puerto Rico, located in the Caribbean, is prone to tropical storms and hurricanes. Following Hurricane María in 2017—which caused widespread damage to the electrical grid and led to prolonged power outages lasting up to a year—some protestors questioned the timing of Luma's takeover in June, coinciding with the start of hurricane season. These concerns have contributed to calls for a transition to renewable energy and a distributed grid model, which some view as incompatible with the privatization of the power utility.

==== Workers' rights ====
PREPA workers protested the takeover citing concerns over their rights. One of their main concerns was job security, since the contract with Luma would force them to reapply for their job under the new company. Workers were concerned that they would be forced to work for other agencies and the company would favor new, inexperienced hires from their companies in the United States, Canada, and Puerto Rico, and that this would be happening at a critical time since June is the beginning of the Atlantic hurricane season. The UTIER, a local trade union, claimed that the contract potentially violates local labor laws. Workers not hired by LUMA were set to become public workers in other agencies, which was in itself a concern due to uncertainty regarding availability of funding for their salaries. Workers were also concerned about their retirement funds.

On June 14, 2021, Luma Energy confirmed via press release that UITICE (Insular Union of Industrial Workers and Electrical Constructions, Spanish: Unión Insular de Trabajadores Industriales y Construcciones Eléctricas) would exclusively be the new trade union representing LUMA electricity workers. UTIER president Ángel Figueroa Jaramillo reacted to this saying that the process was not democratic because no elections were held, leaving the choice at the hands of LUMA Energy only, and that it represented "a clear conspiracy between LUMA Energy and UITICE president Héctor Reyes against protecting workers' rights." Figueroa Jaramillo expressed concerns over whether or not this could mean that UITICE would be unable to properly oversee LUMA Energy and protect workers' rights due to potential conflict of interest with the company. He also reassured workers that UTIER "is still alive and will be creating an organization to group former AEE employees that have moved to other agencies", and that they plan to keep fighting the LUMA contract "that would raise energy rates and provide no power grid improvements, as demonstrated."

=== Power outages ===
Following Luma's takeover, Puerto Rico experienced widespread power outages, prompting emergency declarations by multiple mayors. Luma cited preexisting grid damage, weather, and possible sabotage as causes. Reports indicate that in June 2021, outages affected up to 1 million customers, including 40,000 who lost water service after the Monacillos fire. Meanwhile, the Association of Hospitals (Spanish: Asociación de Hospitales) warned on June 17, 2021, that the power outages put patients’ lives at risk and that the power outage crisis needed to be resolved immediately, regardless of the cause.

On Wednesday, June 16, 2021, a massive power outage left more than 337,000 clients without electricity after three units went offline unexpectedly. The reason for the units' failure was unknown as of June 17, 2021. Hours prior to the incident, LUMA Energy had stated it would be selectively shutting down systems to give them maintenance and due to insufficient power generation capacity, but that this sudden outage was unrelated and not intentional.

On Monday, June 21, 2021, a problem with unit #5 at the Central de San Juan power generation station caused a power relay failure, leaving 45,349 customers without electrical service, most of them in the Ponce area.

The power outage crisis caused one of the island's major shopping centers, Plaza del Caribe in Ponce, to close on June 22, 2021, due to a blackout. However, it was shortly reopened once power was restored.

Power outages in Puerto Rico have been associated with negative health outcomes, including increased hospitalizations for cardiovascular and respiratory diseases. According to the U.S. Energy Information Administration (EIA), customers in Puerto Rico experienced an average of 27 hours of annual power interruptions between 2021 and 2024, not including major events such as hurricanes. The frequency of outages has contributed to growing demand for solar energy on the island, with residents increasingly viewing it as a necessity rather than a luxury.

On April 16, 2025, Puerto Rico experienced a widespread blackout attributed to a fault on a transmission line, which left 1.4 million customers without electricity. The outage occurred just days before Easter and was the second major island-wide blackout in less than four months, following another that took place on New Year’s Eve 2024.
