= Sonnedix =

Solar power in Spain

- Company type: Private
- Industry: Renewable energy producer
- Founded: 2009
- Key people: Axel Thiemann (CEO), Carlos Guinand (Executive Chairman)
- Products: Electricity
- Website: www.sonnedix.com

Sonnedix is an international renewable energy producer with over 400 solar PV plants/farms across 10 countries. Founded in 2009, Sonnedix is majority owned by institutional investors.

Sonnedix ranks as the sixth largest solar PV portfolio in Europe (largest solar Independent Power Producer in Spain, second in Italy, and fifth in France). The company has focused on expanding its operations in Asia (Japan) and the Americas (Chile and the USA) in the recent years. As of March 2022, Sonnedix has more than US$5 billion invested in solar PV projects globally and holds a total capacity of over 9GW, including a development pipeline of more than 6GW.

== Areas of Operation ==
Sonnedix's scope includes the development, construction, and operation of renewable energy projects, and production and sale of renewable electricity. The company's growth strategy focus on the acquisition of both development and operational solar PV and wind projects across OECD countries, and manages both the construction and operation & maintenance stages of projects acquired (through in-house teams and external partners).

== Locations ==
Sonnedix operates in 10 countries around the world, with offices in 8 countries:

- Chile - office in Santiago
- France - offices in La Ciotat and Saint Grégoire
- Italy - office in Milan
- Japan - Sonnedix Japan is a developer, asset manager, and operator of mega-solar projects in Japan, and the Japanese operator for investments made by Sonnedix.
- Poland - office in Warsaw
- Spain - office in Madrid
- United Kingdom - office in London
- United States - office in Miami
