= EcoEléctrica =

Energy corporation headquartered in Peñuelas, Puerto Rico

EcoEléctrica is a Puerto Rican energy corporation headquartered in Peñuelas, Puerto Rico. Since the 2000s, EcoElectrica has the exclusive right to ship liquefied natural gas to Puerto Rico. Its main shareholder is GasNatural Fenosa.

In June 2008, EcoEléctrica started the environmental impact assessment of the LNG terminal modification project, including construction and operation of natural gas pipeline facilities.

It owns and operates a liquefied natural gas regasification terminal with a storage tank of 160,000 cubic meters in Punta Guayanilla, Peñuelas. The power generated by EcoEléctrica is transmitted to the LUMA Energy operated power grid. Steam generated by the waste heat from exhaust gasses is used in both a Toshiba-supplied steam turbine and a desalination plant.
