= Government of Puerto Rico =

Government of the Commonwealth of Puerto Rico Gobierno del Estado Libre Asociado de Puerto Rico (Spanish)
- Logo of the Government of Puerto Rico (English) Great Seal of Puerto Rico
- Part of: United States of America
- Constitution: Constitution of Puerto Rico

Legislative branch
- Name: Legislative Assembly
- Type: Bicameral
- Meeting place: Capitol of Puerto Rico
- Upper house
- Name: Senate
- Presiding officer: Thomas Rivera Schatz, President
- Lower house
- Name: House of Representatives
- Presiding officer: Carlos Johnny Méndez, Speaker

Executive branch
- Head of state and government
- Title: Governor
- Currently: Jenniffer González Colón
- Appointer: Election
- Cabinet
- Name: Cabinet of the Commonwealth of Puerto Rico
- Leader: Governor
- Headquarters: La Fortaleza

Judicial branch
- Name: Judiciary of Puerto Rico
- Courts: Courts of Puerto Rico
- Puerto Rico Supreme Court
- Chief judge: Maite Oronoz Rodríguez
- Seat: Supreme Court Building of Puerto Rico

The government of Puerto Rico (Spanish: Gobierno de Puerto Rico) encompasses the local administrative structure of the archipelago and island of Puerto Rico, an unincorporated territory of the United States organized under the Constitution of Puerto Rico since its establishment as the Commonwealth of Puerto Rico in 1952. The government is a democratic republic divided into three branches: the law-implementing executive, the law-making legislative, and the law-interpreting judicial. The governor is the chief executive, the Legislative Assembly is the legislature, and the Supreme Court is the highest court of the territory, which is divided into 78 municipalities, each one headed by a strong mayor and a unicameral legislature. Like U.S. states and other U.S. territories, Puerto Rico is subject to the sovereign jurisdiction of the U.S. federal government.

With the American annexation of Puerto Rico during the Spanish–American War, the U.S. established a military government to administer the unincorporated territory from 1898 to 1900, when it was replaced by a civil insular government organized under the organic acts of the Foraker Act from 1900 to 1917 and the Jones–Shafroth Act from 1917 to 1952. The Constitution of Puerto Rico established the Commonwealth of Puerto Rico and its government under the continued status of unincorporated territory in 1952. With the ratification of the constitution, the full authority and responsibility for the local administration of Puerto Rico was vested in the residents of Puerto Rico, resulting in complete self-governance within the archipelago and island.

Puerto Rico has a republican form of government seated in the capital municipality of San Juan with executive, legislative, and judicial powers. The executive branch is led by a governor, currently Jenniffer González-Colón, who is also the head of government. The legislative branch consists of a bicameral legislature, namely the Legislative Assembly, which is composed by the Senate as its upper house and by the House of Representatives as its lower house. The governor and legislators are elected by popular vote every four years. The judicial branch is headed by the chief justice of the Supreme Court, currently Maite Oronoz Rodríguez. It consists of one Supreme Court, one Court of Appeals, and the Court of First Instance, which is composed of 13 Superior Courts and 78 Municipal Courts. The legal system is a mixture of the civil law and the common law systems. Members of the judicial branch are appointed by the governor with advice and consent from the Senate.

The U.S. president, currently Donald Trump, is head of state. The extent of the powers of the local government and the rights of its citizens as enumerated in the Puerto Rican constitution and law are bound to the authority of the U.S. Constitution and law, which are enacted and amended by the U.S. Congress, executed and enforced by the U.S. president, and interpreted and validated by the U.S. Supreme Court. However, the U.S. Constitution applies selectively in Puerto Rico, as it is not incorporated into the U.S. As a result, not all constitutional rights are available for Puerto Rico, including the right to voting representation in the U.S. Congress, where it is only represented by a resident commissioner, a non-voting member to the U.S. House elected by popular vote every four years. Furthermore, residents of Puerto Rico cannot vote in U.S. presidential general elections, as it is not entitled to electoral votes for president.

Neither a sovereign state nor a U.S. state, Puerto Rico is a self-governing unincorporated U.S. territory subject to the constitutional and territorial sovereignty of the U.S. federal government. Specifically, the U.S. Congress has plenary authority or unlimited power over the archipelago and island through the Territorial Clause in Article IV of the U.S. Constitution. As such, it operates as an administrative division and dependent territory belonging to, but not an integral part of, the U.S., which is composed of the 50 states and the federal District of Columbia.

The U.S. federal government has enumerated powers, including monetary policy, foreign relations, and defense, while the local government has reserved powers, including education, law enforcement, and elections. Both governments share concurrent powers, including taxation and fiscal policy. The political status of Puerto Rico is an ongoing debate.

== History ==
Puerto Rico was ceded to the United States by Spain at the end of the Spanish–American War by the Treaty of Paris of 1898. The Foraker Act of 1900 provided for an organization of the civilian government. The Jones–Shafroth Act of 1917 re-organized the government.

The United States government authorized Puerto Rico to draft its own constitution by Pub. L. 81–600, 64 Stat. 319, enacted July 3, 1950. On June 4, 1951, the Puerto Ricans voted to hold a constitutional convention in a referendum, and elected delegates on August 27, 1951. The convention adopted a constitution on 6 February 1952 and was ratified by Puerto Rico's electorate in a referendum on March 3, 1952.

The United States government approved an amended version by Pub. L. 82–447, 66 Stat. 327, enacted July 3, 1952, and on July 10, 1952, the Constitutional Convention of Puerto Rico reconvened and approved the conditions established by Pub. L. 82–447. On July 25, 1952, Governor Luis Muñoz Marín proclaimed that the Constitution of Puerto Rico was in effect.

== Executive branch ==
The executive branch is responsible for administering public resources, as well as providing all necessary public services to the Puerto Rican general public. It is by far the largest branch in the government as well as the largest employer in Puerto Rico with more than 150,000 workers.

=== Governor ===
The head of government is the governor of Puerto Rico, who is elected every four years in a general election. The position is similar in nature, responsibility, and power as those of a governor of a U.S. state. The position of Governor has the overall responsibility of the state of the commonwealth, equivalent to the state of the union in the U.S. The official residence of the governor is La Fortaleza, the oldest executive mansion in continuous use in the Western Hemisphere.

The Governor has the authority to nominate agency heads, trial and appellate judges, as well as Supreme Court justices and directors of public corporations, although these must be confirmed by the Senate and, in a handful of cases, the House, as well. Similar to a U.S. State, the Governor has authority over the Puerto Rico National Guard.

Although Puerto Rico does not have the position of Lieutenant Governor, sections 7 and 8 of the Constitution empower the Secretary of the Puerto Rico State Department to act as Acting Governor, should the governor be absent from Puerto Rico, become temporarily disabled or unable to discharge his/her duties, and as Governor for the remainder of the term should a permanent vacancy occur.

=== Lieutenant governor ===
Puerto Rico does not have a post for lieutenant governor but it has a secretary of state which performs a similar role. The secretary of state is the successor of the governor and is empowered to act as acting governor— the Constitution of Puerto Rico and Puerto Rican law establishes a governmental line of succession starting with the secretary of state.

=== Acting Governor ===
Article IV of the Constitution of Puerto Rico establishes that the secretary of state should serve as acting governor when the governor is not available. The Constitution and Puerto Rican law establishes a governmental line of succession for special cases when neither the governor nor the secretary are available.

=== Cabinet ===
Article IV of the Constitution of Puerto Rico establishes that the governor shall be assisted by secretaries who shall collectively constitute the governor's advisory council and be designated as the Council of Secretaries although it's mostly referred to as the Cabinet.

The Cabinet is composed by the Constitutional Cabinet, composed by the secretaries established by the Constitution, and the Operational Cabinet, composed by the secretaries established by extraconstitutional Puerto Rican law or appointed by the governor. These Cabinets do not exist as agencies, but are referred as such in transcripts, records, official documents, and conversations for brevity and easiness.

All Cabinet members are nominated by the governor and then presented to the Senate for advice and consent by a simple majority. If they are approved, they are sworn in and then begin their duties. All members receive the title of Secretary.

Members of the Cabinet serve at the pleasure of the governor, who may dismiss them or reappoint them (to other posts) at will.

=== Executive departments ===
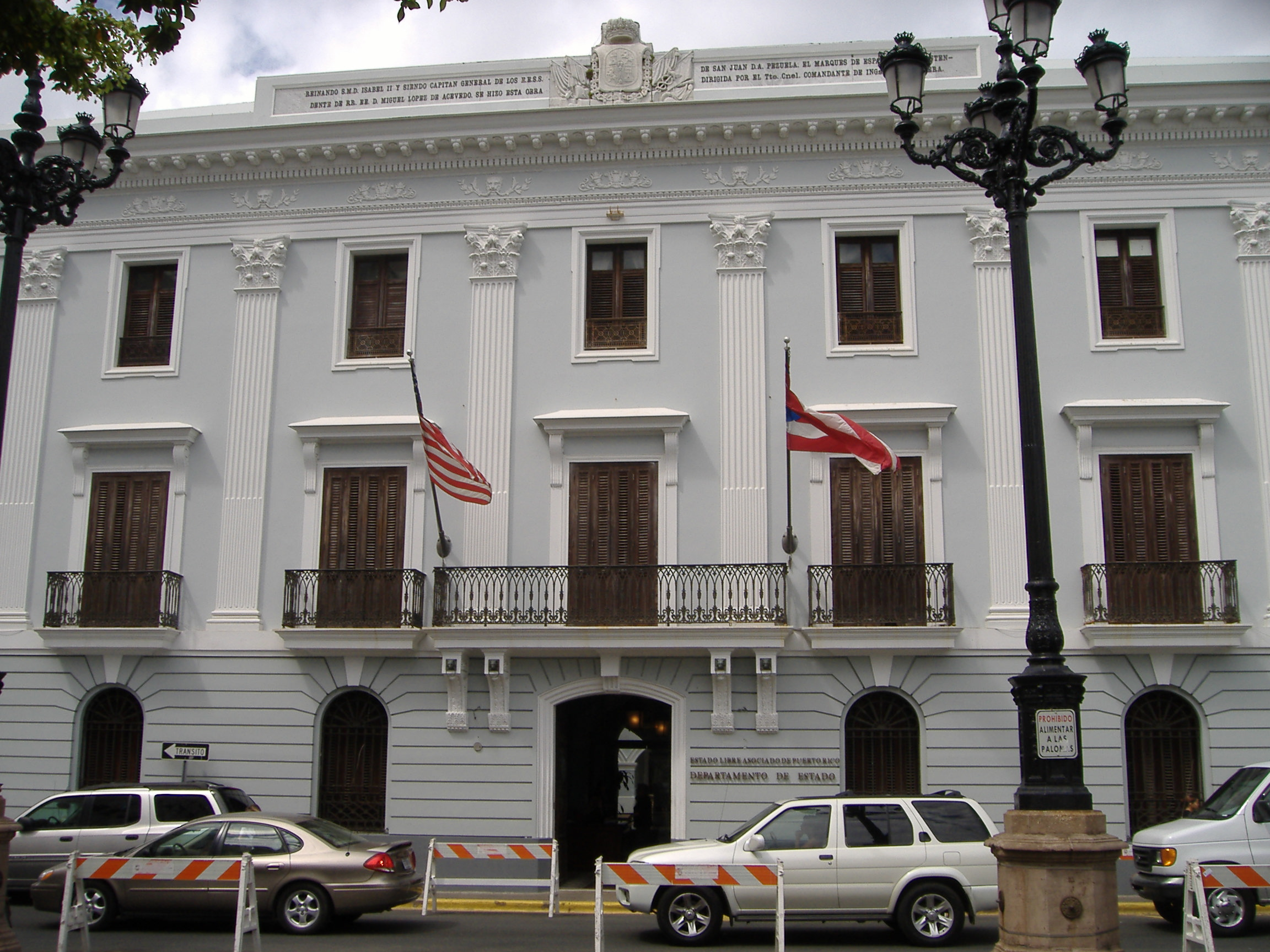
The main offices of the Puerto Rico Department of State in front of Plaza de Armas in Old San Juan

The day-to-day enforcement and administration of laws is delegated by the governor to 16 executive departments created by the Constitution or by statute to deal with specific areas of government. The heads of the departments, chosen by the governor and approved by the Senate (with the exception of the secretary of state, who requires Senate and House confirmation), form a council of advisers generally known as the Governor's Cabinet.

The Constitution provides for the creation of at least eight departments: Departments of State, Justice, Education, Health, Treasury, Labor, Agriculture, Commerce, and Public Works. However, due to the increase in population, economy, and public needs over the years, the Puerto Rico government has expanded the executive branch by establishing additional executive departments not specified in the Constitution. These additional departments are established by public law or so-called "reorganization plans", as approved by the legislative assembly.

The title of Secretary is given to the heads of the executive departments, whose position is also created by statute. Cabinet member is another title primarily given by the media and the public, though it is considered unofficial. All cabinet-level Secretaries are first nominated by the Governor and are confirmed by the legislative assembly.

Each department has different divisions, agencies, bureaus, offices, and services, each with specific duties, in order to provide the necessary services to the general public across the island.

=== Government-owned corporations ===
Puerto Rico has also established several government-owned corporations in order to provide basic and public services to its citizens, including electricity, water, transportation, and education, among others. These are separate legal entities from the commonwealth, but the government owns virtually all of these corporations' stock. Each corporation is headed by an executive director who is appointed by the corporations’ boards of directors. The directors are nominated by the governor and confirmed by the state legislative assembly.

Although government-owned corporations are separate from the commonwealth government, who generate their income and expenses independently, several of those have faced financial troubles, and have constantly relied on so called “bail-outs” from the commonwealth to offset recurring losses and deficits, and have been unable to legally declare bankruptcy.

== Legislative branch ==
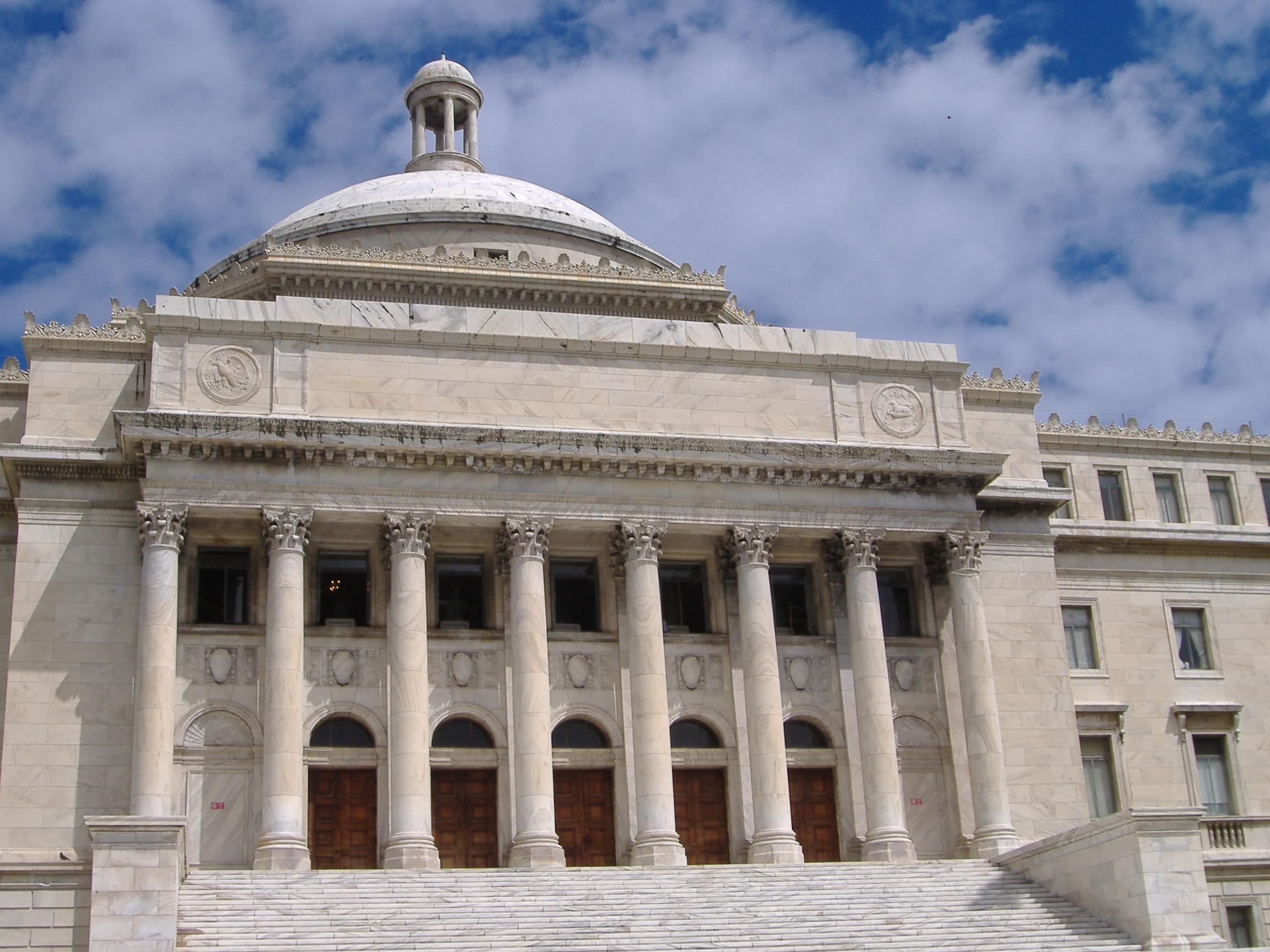
South view of the Puerto Rico Capitol, home of the Legislative Assembly

Article III of the Constitution of Puerto Rico grants all legislative powers of the commonwealth government to the Legislative Assembly of Puerto Rico, which is divided into two chambers: a 27-member Senate and a 51-member House of Representatives. The chambers are presided over by the president of the Senate and the speaker of the House, respectively. Both positions are occupied by an active member of each body, elected by a majority of both chambers. The current heads are Senator Thomas Rivera Schatz and Representative Carlos Johnny Méndez, respectively.

Members are elected to both chambers in general elections held every four years, along with the elections for the governor and the 78 municipal mayors. Each member of the Legislative Assembly represents an electoral district, with the exception of a number of legislators who are considered at-large and represent the island as a whole. Members representing specific districts are elected by the citizens residing within the district, while at-large legislators are elected by accumulation of all island votes.

=== Constitutional changes ===
In recent years, two referendums have been held to propose constitutional changes to substantially modify the composition of the Legislative Assembly.

Various organizations pushed for changing the legislative assembly from the current two-chamber system (House and Senate) prevalent in 49 of the 50 states of the nation to one-chamber (unicameralism). The reasons for this proposed change was based on the growing public opinion that members of the assembly are overpaid, and that a smaller assembly might achieve the same work results as the bicameral one with less public expenditures. However, an official report of 1995 indicates that this argument should not be considered the primary objective because the savings are not significant. The legislative spending in Puerto Rico, compared with the consolidated government budget is less than 1% of total government spending.

Lacking the two-thirds majority necessary in both houses of the Legislature to submit constitutional amendments to the electorate, in 2004 the Popular Democratic Party's then-majority approved legislation to hold a referendum, not on a particular constitutional amendment as such, but on the general concept of switching from a bicameral to a unicameral system which was held on July 10, 2005. Attended by less than 25% of the islands' electorate, Puerto Rican voters approved the change to a unicameral legislature by 456,267 votes in favor, versus 88,720 against. (Voter turnout was 22.6% of the electorate.) Almost four years later, incoming Governor Luis Fortuño (from the New Progressive Party or New Party of Progress (NPP)) discarded the alternative of unicameralism claiming that the NPP's platform, rather than advocating unicameralism, supported submitting to the people a constitutional amendment proposing a substantial reduction in seats in the existing bicameral legislature.

In 2012, Governor Fortuño proposed, and by a two thirds majority in both houses, the Legislature approved submitting to the people a constitutional amendment reducing the size of the House from 51 to 39 seats and the Senate from 27 to 17 seats, essentially a 30% reduction in size. However, in an August 18, 2012 referendum, the constitutional proposition failed by a 54% to 46% margin.

== Judicial branch ==
The judiciary of Puerto Rico consists of the Supreme Court of Puerto Rico, Court of Appeals, and the Court of First Instance consisting of the Superior Courts and the Municipal Courts. The Supreme Court, the commonwealth's highest court, holds its sessions in San Juan's Miramar district.

== Local government ==
Puerto Rico is divided into 78 municipalities, each headed by a mayor. The municipalities also have a municipal legislature, which is in charge of overseeing the mayor's operations, holding public meetings, and enacting municipal resolutions and ordinances. Both the mayor and the municipal legislators are elected at-large by the municipality's citizens in general elections held every four years. Unlike most towns, cities and states in the United States, Puerto Rico does not have local or state sheriffs; sheriff duties are instead performed by the Puerto Rico Commonwealth Marshal's Office. Many municipalities have established municipal police departments, although most law enforcement activity is carried out by the Puerto Rico Police (PPR).

== Government finances ==
Puerto Rico's central government, which includes all three branches of government but excludes public corporations and municipalities, has an annual general budget that currently ranges from $8.5 billion to $9 billion in revenues and expenditures. The government also receives more than $4.2 billion annually in subsidies and federal aid from the United States. A substantial portion of this amount is earmarked for public welfare, including funding educational programs (such as Head Start), subsidized housing programs (such as Section 8 and public housing projects), and a food stamp system called the Nutrition Assistance for Puerto Rico program.

Government-owned corporations generate approximately $6.3 billion in general revenues by charging citizens for the services they provide. The largest government-owned corporation, the Puerto Rico Electric Power Authority (PREPA), generates almost half of those revenues alone ($3 billion). However, government-owned corporations generate about $10.6 billion in expenses when combined, requiring substantial subsidies by the central government. In 2005, the central government provided more than $2.6 billion in subsidies, while the remaining expenditures were funded through interest and investment earnings.

When considering all three branches of government, including all government-owned corporations and municipalities, the government of Puerto Rico's annual expenditures can reach to more than $28 billion.

=== Central government revenues ===
The central government's main source of revenue is income tax imposed on individual citizens and private companies, which can amount to approximately $5.5 billion. Other significant sources of revenue include excise taxes on imports, cigarettes, liquor, hotel rooms, cement, and vehicles ($2 billion); and lotteries ($870 million).

==== Sales and Use Tax ====
On November 15, 2006, the government eliminated the excise tax of 6.6% on imports (taxes on cigarettes, liquor, and cars are still in effect) and substituted it for a 5.5% islandwide Sales and Use Tax, plus a municipal sales tax of 1.5%, for a total of 7%, in what has been known as the Puerto Rico Tax Reform. This change was partly due to the government's growing expenditures and fiscal deficits which remained unchecked and uncorrected for several years, until several credit rating agencies warned public officials that all general-obligation bonds issued by the government were to be downgraded if the problem was not corrected.

The situation reached a turning point when the executive branch of the government was partially shutdown, the events now known as the 2006 Puerto Rico budget crisis. Thirty-three (33) agencies were closed and 95,762 employees were sent home without pay. Following public bickering between the two main political parties, the new sales tax was approved in favor of the excise tax on imports on May 10, 2006, ending the budget crisis.

=== Central government expenditures ===
The largest types of expenditures made by the government are those related to education. In 2005 alone, the government expended more than $5 billion in public education and education-related programs, representing approx. 28% of total government expenditures (excluding public corporations). Other significant expenditures include public housing and welfare ($3.4 billion or 19%), public safety ($2.5 billion or 14%) and public health ($2.3 billion or 13%).

=== Public debt ===
In May 2007, local economists expressed serious concerns when it was revealed that the Puerto Rico public debt equaled to 76% of its gross national product (GNP), making it one of the most indebted countries by percentage in the world, even more than the United States. Economists have criticized the government's fiscal policy, whose level of expenditures and indebtedness has increased significantly within the past decade while the economy was grown at a much slower pace. Between 2000 and 2006 alone, Puerto Rico's GNP rose 5.37%, while its public debt's relation to GNP rose 18%. By comparison, many other Latin American countries have seen reductions in their GNP-public debt percentages during that same time period.

By early 2017, the Puerto Rican government-debt crisis posed serious problems for the government which was saddled with outstanding bond debt that had climbed to $70 billion or $12,000 per capita at a time with a 45 percent poverty rate and 12.4% unemployment that is more than twice the mainland U.S. average. The debt had been increasing during a decade long recession.

The Commonwealth had been defaulting on many debts, including bonds, since 2015. With debt payments due, the Governor was facing the risk of a government shutdown and failure to fund the managed care health system. "Without action before April, Puerto Rico’s ability to execute contracts for Fiscal Year 2018 with its managed care organizations will be threatened, thereby putting at risk beginning July 1, 2017 the health care of up to 900,000 poor U.S. citizens living in Puerto Rico", according to a letter sent to Congress by the Secretary of the Treasury and the Secretary of Health and Human Services. They also said that "Congress must enact measures recommended by both Republicans and Democrats that fix Puerto Rico’s inequitable health care financing structure and promote sustained economic growth."

Initially, the oversight board created under PROMESA called for Puerto Rico's governor Ricardo Rosselló to deliver a fiscal turnaround plan by January 28. Just before that deadline, the control board gave the Commonwealth government until February 28 to present a fiscal plan (including negotiations with creditors for restructuring debt) to solve the problems. A moratorium on lawsuits by debtors was extended to May 31. It is essential for Puerto Rico to reach restructuring deals to avoid a bankruptcy-like process under PROMESA.

Statehood might be useful as a means of dealing with the financial crisis, since it would allow for bankruptcy and the relevant protection. In the Puerto Rican status referendum, 2020, the majority of voters approved of Puerto Rico becoming a state. However, the referendum was non-binding, and there has been little federal action since the referendum.

According to the Government Development Bank, statehood might be the only solution to the debt crisis. Congress has the power to vote to allow Chapter 9 protection without the need for statehood, but in late 2015 there was very little support in the House for this concept. Other benefits to statehood include increased disability benefits and Medicaid funding, the right to vote in Presidential elections and the higher (federal) minimum wage.

== See also ==
- Nutrition Assistance for Puerto Rico
- Political party strength in Puerto Rico
- Politics of Puerto Rico
- Puerto Rico Federal Affairs Administration
- Puerto Rico Health Reform
- Law of Puerto Rico
