= Judiciary of Puerto Rico =

Defined under the Constitution of Puerto Rico

The Judiciary of Puerto Rico is the judicial branch of the Government of Puerto Rico, comprising all the courts of the Commonwealth of Puerto Rico. Defined under the Constitution of Puerto Rico, it consists of one Supreme Court, one Court of Appeals, and the Court of First Instance, which is composed of 13 Superior Courts and 78 Municipal Courts, one for each municipality. Federally, the archipelago and island is under the jurisdiction of the United States District Court for the District of Puerto Rico, which appeals cases to the United States Court of Appeals for the First Circuit.

== Courts ==
The courts consist of the:

- Supreme Court of Puerto Rico;
- Court of Appeals; and
- Court of First Instance.

=== Supreme Court ===
The Supreme Court of Puerto Rico (Tribunal Supremo) is the highest court of Puerto Rico, having judicial authority to interpret and decide questions of Puerto Rican law. The Court is analogous to one of the state supreme courts of the states of the United States; being the Supreme Court of Puerto Rico the highest state court and the court of last resort in Puerto Rico. Article V of the Constitution of Puerto Rico vests the judicial power on the Supreme Court

=== Court of Appeals ===
The Court of Appeals of Puerto Rico (Tribunal de Apelaciones) reviews decisions of the Courts of First Instance in addition to the final decisions of administrative agencies. The Judiciary Act of 1992 created the Court of Appeal as an intermediate court between the Courts of First Instance and the Supreme Court. The seat of the Court is in San Juan, Puerto Rico. The Court consists of 39 judges.

=== Court of First Instance ===
The Court of First Instance (Tribunal de Primera Instancia) is further composed of the:

- Superior Courts; and
- Municipal Courts.

In 2003, the Court of First Instance was divided into 13 districts for administrative purposes.

==== Superior Courts ====
The Superior Courts (Tribunal Superior) are courts of general jurisdiction, and where felony trials are held. They also try driving under the influence cases.

==== Municipal Courts ====
There is a Municipal Court (Tribunal Municipal) for each of the 78 Municipalities of Puerto Rico. They have traditionally been like Justice of the Peace courts, empowered to fix bail and issue arrest and search warrants.

They replaced the previous District Courts (Tribunal de Distrito) by Act No. 92 of 5 December 1991. The District Courts were the lowest courts of general jurisdiction. As of 15 July 2013, the "Tribunal de Distrito" in Puerto Rico was still in the process of being "abolished". The District Courts typically held probable cause hearings in driving under the influence cases.

== Administration ==
Article V, Section 6 of the Constitution of Puerto Rico and Section 2003 of the Judiciary Act of 1995 empowers the Supreme Court of Puerto Rico to adopt rules of court. It is supported by the Office of Court Administration (Oficina de Administración de los Tribunales) led by the Administrative Director of the Courts (Director Administrativo de los Tribunales).

The Bar Association of Puerto Rico (Colegio de Abogados de Puerto Rico) is the bar association.

== Officers ==
=== Judges ===
The Court of Appeals judges are appointed by the Governor with the advice and consent of the Senate and serve for a period of 16 years.

The judges of the Court are appointed by the Governor with the advice and consent of the Senate. Both Superior Court judges and Municipal Court judges are appointed for a term of 12 years.

== See also ==
- Government of Puerto Rico
- Law of Puerto Rico
- Law enforcement in Puerto Rico
- United States District Court for the District of Puerto Rico
