= Puerto Rico Health Reform =

Puerto Rico's Medicaid program

The Puerto Rico Health Reform —Spanish: Reforma de Salud de Puerto Rico, refers to the Medicaid health plan which is a "subset of the larger public government healthcare delivery system" of Puerto Rico. It was once called "La Reforma", later it was called "Mi Salud" and now called Vital (The Vital Plan) but they are all Medicaid, a government-run program which provides medical and healthcare services to indigent and impoverished citizens of Puerto Rico. It was locally referred to simply as La Reforma (The Reform) — for many years. Puerto Rico's Medicaid program is, similar to other Medicaid programs of states of the United States. The funding is by the U.S. Medicaid program in the form of a block grant, unlike how states of the United States Medicaid programs are funded and in 2019 much of the funding was slashed.

== History ==
As of March, 2018 Puerto Rico had 86 operational health centers accepting Medicaid.

Puerto Rico's indigent population has relied exclusively on the local government for their healthcare needs since the start of the island's commonwealth status. The government maintained several hospitals, emergency centers, and free clinics, including the Rio Piedras Medical Center (Centro Médico in Spanish) which is considered the largest hospital on the island and one of the largest in the Caribbean. However, this system presented substantial costs to the government while generating increasing criticism from the public and media citing a sluggish bureaucracy and poor services from unprofessional government workers.

In 1994, then Governor of Puerto Rico Pedro Rosselló proposed and implemented the privatization of the public health system under the name "Health Reform". The privatization plan included selling the government-owned hospitals and medical centers to local and United States investors and then implementing a universal free and/or low-cost health insurance plan for poor and needy citizens. The only exception to the Reform was that mental health benefits and services were to be provided by behavioral healthcare and mental healthcare companies, and not by insurance carriers.

The privatization plan required the service population to be divided into geographical areas with each area assigned to a sole insurance carrier by means of a services contract awarded through competitive bidding and proposals. The designation and assignment of geographical areas were finalized in 2001. Subsequent to 1994, all government hospitals and medical centers were sold to private companies and investors, including local medical groups and companies composed of doctors. The only exception to the privatization plan was that the Rio Piedras Medical Center would be (and still is) run by the commonwealth government.

The privatization plan has met subsequent criticisms from different industry and public sectors, who argue that the plan was marred with government corruption. Several politicians, private investors, and government employees have been accused and/or convicted of perpetrating bribery and extortion schemes during the selling and acquisition of government medical centers. One of the most famous convictions was that of prominent New Progressive Party legislator Edison Misla Aldarondo.

== The reform ==
The three largest insurance companies operating in Puerto Rico are currently the only ones participating in "The Reform". These were Triple-S, Inc. with 40.4% of the Reform beneficiaries, Medical Card Systems (MCS) with 33.5%, and Humana with 26.1%.

The Reform faced criticism because of the increasing costs associated with the system. Under the administration of Gov. Sila Calderón, the government tried to cut back on services and eliminated many participants from the program in an effort to curtail expenditures. However, the program still requires a substantial amount of funds to cover its $1.4 billion annual expenditures (2005). In 2005 alone, only $400 million was generated from participant deductibles and charges for services to cover program expenses, while the remaining $1 billion in expenses was covered by a subsidy provided by the state government.

These criticisms and fallbacks led the government to implement more stringent controls over the operations of the Reform as well as to diversify the way it provides services to beneficiaries. A pilot project began in 2003 whereby the government contracted the services of one area directly to a medical healthcare provider instead of contracting an insurance company, and the government has stated that this and other programs may be implemented and expanded in the future in order to reduce costs. However, some politicians, including former Gov. Pedro Rosselló, are campaigning to create a universal health care system by expanding the reform program to all citizens that lack a private insurance plan.

== Vital ==
Regardless of its name, as its restructured by different governors of Puerto Rico- the plan is now called "Vital"- and is there to manage the Medicaid of Puerto Rico. Puerto Rico's Medicaid is covered by a block grant from the United States and the program must conform to federal guidelines. The program is run by means of contracting private health insurance companies, as opposed to the traditional system of government-owned hospitals and emergency centers. The Reform is administered by the Puerto Rico Health Insurance Administration.

== See also ==
- Public welfare in Puerto Rico
- Health care systems
- Universal health care
- Nutrition Assistance for Puerto Rico
- Government of Puerto Rico
