= Internal Revenue Code (Puerto Rico) =

Tax code for Puerto Rico

The Internal Revenue Code of Puerto Rico (Spanish: Código de Rentas Internas de Puerto Rico) is the main body of domestic statutory tax law of Puerto Rico organized topically, including laws covering income taxes, payroll taxes, gift taxes, estate taxes, and statutory excise taxes.

== Sales and use tax ==
On July 4, 2006, the government approved Law 117, the 2006 Contributive Justice Law. It established a 5.5% state tax and an optional 1.5% municipal tax. It came into effect on November 15, 2006. The tax is better known as the Impuesto sobre Ventas y Uso (Sales and Use Tax) or by its Spanish acronym, IVU.

The law amended Article B of the Code and created sub-article BB.

On July 29, 2007, the government approved Law Number 80, making the tax mandatory for all municipalities of the commonwealth. Also, the tax rates changed to 6% at the state level and 1% at the municipal level.

In 2015, the Sales Tax and Use rate went from 7% to 11.5%.

In June 2025, the Puerto Rican Senate approved House Bill 505, which imposes a 4% tax on new individual beneficiaries under Law 60-2019, known as the Puerto Rican Incentives Code. The bill is part of a broader review of the tax incentive system, amid a public debate on the law's real benefits for the local economy.

== See also ==
- Legal profession in Puerto Rico
- Law of Puerto Rico
- Taxation in Puerto Rico
