= Legal profession in Puerto Rico =

The legal profession in Puerto Rico is practiced at both commonwealth and Federal levels. Thus, legal professionals in Puerto Rico must study both the law of Puerto Rico and the law of the United States.

There are presently three law schools in the commonwealth:

- University of Puerto Rico School of Law, established in 1913
- Pontifical Catholic University of Puerto Rico School of Law, established in 1961
- Interamerican University of Puerto Rico School of Law, established in 1961

Facultad de Derecho Eugenio Maria de Hostos was established in 1995, but closed in 2013.

After completing a Juris Doctor Degree lawyers have to pass the Puerto Rico General Bar Exam in order to practice law. Lawyers that graduated from ABA accredited schools may also practice in Puerto Rico, but they must also take the bar exam.

Until 2010 all lawyers had to be associated to the Puerto Rico Bar Association in order to practice law.

== See also ==
- Judiciary of Puerto Rico
- Internal Revenue Code (Puerto Rico)
- Law of Puerto Rico
- Puerto Rico Tax and Customs Laws
