= Welfare in Puerto Rico =

Public welfare in Puerto Rico is a system of nutrition assistance, public health, education, and subsidized public housing, among others, provided to the impoverished population of the island.

== Federal programs ==
The following programs are provided by the U.S. Federal government in Puerto Rico:

- Head Start Program
- USDA Nutrition Assistance for Puerto Rico (Programa de Asistencia Nutricional)
- Section 8 (housing)
- USDA Section 515 Rural Rental Housing
- Community Development Block Grant
- Temporary Assistance for Needy Families
- USDA Rural Development programs

== See also ==
- Economy of Puerto Rico
- Welfare in New York
- Welfare in California
