= Nutrition Assistance Grants =

Nutrition Assistance Grants are the Federal programs in Puerto Rico and American Samoa that provide food assistance through block grant funds in lieu of food stamps, and to the Northern Marianas under a covenant governing U.S. relations with that jurisdiction.

== See also ==
- Food and Nutrition Service
- Nutrition Assistance for Puerto Rico
