= John Carro =

American judge (1927–2026)

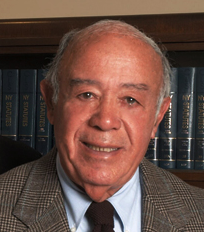

Associate Justice of the New York Supreme Court, Appellate Division, First Department
- In office 1979–1994
- Appointed by: Hugh Carey

Personal details
- Born: August 21, 1927 Orocovis, Puerto Rico
- Died: July 26, 2026 (aged 98) Suffern, New York, U.S.
- Education: Fordham University (BA); Brooklyn Law School (JD)

Military service
- Allegiance: United States
- Branch/service: United States Navy; United States Army Reserve
- Years of service: 1945-1949
- Rank: First lieutenant

John Carro (August 24, 1927 – July 26, 2026) was an American judge. He served as a judge for 25 years and was involved in many high-profile cases. A New York Supreme Court Justice serving in the Appellate Division, where he served as an associate justice for the last 15 of his 25 years as a judge. After retirement from the bench in 1994, Carro founded Carro, Velez, Carro & Mitchell (now known as Carro, Carro & Mitchell), a private law firm in New York City. Carro was an ardent advocate for the Hispanic and Latino American community and human rights throughout the world, and has been a major leader in the founding and management of many bar groups, committees and legal and educational associations. He was described by The New York Times as a "legendary Justice".

== Early life and education ==
Carro was born in Orocovis, Puerto Rico on August 21, 1927. His family moved to New York City in 1937 when he was 10 years old and he grew up in East Harlem. Carro graduated from Benjamin Franklin High School in 1945. He served in the United States Navy from 1945 to 1947 and later went on to serve in the United States Army Reserve until his honorable discharge as a First Lieutenant in 1949. He received a Bachelor of Arts from Fordham University in 1949 and his J.D. degree from Brooklyn Law School in 1952. Judge Carro attended one year at New York University's School of Public Administration through the City Executive Program. In addition he received a Masters of Judicial Process from the University of Virginia School of Law in 1984.

== Early career ==
Growing up, Carro wanted to get social work experience. At the same time that he began law school in 1949, he began working as a social investigator for the city of New York. He continued in this position until 1952. After graduating from Brooklyn Law School in 1952, Carro worked as a probation officer in the Children's Division of the Domestic Relations Court until the fall of 1954. He worked as an officer with the New York City Police Department for one month, but then decided to resign. He preferred working with young people in a more direct, preventative way, before they committed a crime, were arrested and had to go to court. For this reason, he joined the New City Youth Board and worked with the council of Social and Athletic Clubs, otherwise known as the "street gang project" until 1958.

In 1956, while Carro was working with the New City Youth Board, he was admitted to practice law. That year John was appointed to the State Commission Against Discrimination, and he worked as a field representative for the next 4 years. From 1960 to 1961 he was the associate director for a joint private, city, state and federally -funded organization, known as Mobilization for Youth, developing youth programs.

Carro was appointed an Assistant to the Mayor Robert F. Wagner in 1960, remaining at this post until 1965. He was also Director of the Mayor's Information Center and the Mayor's liaison to social services agencies. Carro was the first Puerto Rican to serve as an Assistant to the Mayor in New York City, a position now known as Deputy Mayor.

== 1964 investigation of the President Kennedy assassination ==
During his time serving in the Mayor's office, Carro was called as a witness during the investigation of the assassination of President John F. Kennedy by the United States House Select Committee on Assassinations (HSCA). His testimony was taken on April 16, 1964.

Carro was called to testify regarding his knowledge of Lee Harvey Oswald. When Carro was a probation officer, he had become acquainted with Oswald. In 1953, when Oswald was 13 years of age, Carro was assigned to the case after Oswald had been found guilty of truancy from school and was remanded to the Youth House. During the Warren investigation in 1964, Carro testified about his interactions with Oswald, his opinions on Oswald's mental and psychiatric state, and whether or not his childhood gave any indication that he would commit any violent act in the future, such as the assassination of President John F. Kennedy. In 1967, Carro appeared on the CBS game show To Tell the Truth in a segment concerning his involvement with Oswald.

Near the close of his testimony, Carro stated "Whatever I might say would just be an independent opinion on my own and I don't think that would be that valid", thus concluding that the original psychiatric and social reports would be of most use to the commission. Judge Carro has appeared in numerous documentaries about the Kennedy assassination. As of 2026, he was one of the few people still alive known to have meaningful interaction with the young Lee Harvey Oswald.

== Legal experience and court appointments ==
From 1965 to 1969, Carro was in private practice and was law partner with Mary Johnson Lowe, a prominent African American attorney who was later appointed a Federal Court Judge. In 1969, Carro was appointed Judge of the New York City Criminal Court by Mayor John V. Lindsay. In 1976, Carro became an Acting New York Supreme Court Justice and in 1977, was officially elected to the Supreme Court. Carro was the first Puerto Rican to be elected to the Supreme Court in the Bronx. Two years later in 1979, Governor Hugh L. Carey appointed Carro to the Appellate Division, First Department. This appointment made Carro the first Puerto Rican to ever sit on the bench as an Appellate Court Justice, which became a very significant and inspirational event for the Latino community and young immigrants across the United States. In 1988 Carro was nominated to become a United States district judge of the United States District Court for the Southern District of New York, which included Manhattan, the Bronx, and Westchester County. However, the Ronald Reagan and George H. W. Bush White House did not act on his nomination for three years and Carro withdrew his name from consideration in 1991. Carro subsequently served 15 years at his post as an Appellate Court Justice, until his retirement in 1994. During this time he was involved with thousands of cases including personal injury, corporate finance and various commercial, financial, real estate, and criminal law matters.

== Later career and death ==
In 1994, Carro retired as a judge and went back to practicing law. He founded the firm Carro, Velez, Carro & Mitchell now known as Carro, Carro & Mitchell with his fellow partners: his son John S. Carro, and Bartly L. Mitchell. John Carro continued to work at the firm in New York City which is best known for its representation of accident victims in negligence cases and its appellate practice.

Carro died at his home in Suffern, New York, on July 26, 2026, at the age of 98.

== Awards, honors and civic involvement ==
In 1987, Carro was awarded the Martin Luther King Jr. Freedom Medal by New York Governor Mario Cuomo. In 1986 Carro was named one of the "100 most influential Hispanics in the United States". Among other awards is a Lifetime Service Award from the Commonwealth of Puerto Rico, as well as Lifetime Achievement Awards from the Daily News, the Puerto Rican Legal Defense Fund, New York University, the Hispanic National Bar Association, the Puerto Rican Bar Association and the Association of Judges of Hispanic Heritage.

The Association of Judges of Hispanic Heritage now presents an annual "John Carro Award for Judicial Excellence". The John Carro Award is presented to a member of the judiciary who manifests both a comprehensive understanding of the law but also a commitment to the preservation of human rights. Past recipients include United States Supreme Court Justice Sonia Sotomayor.

Throughout his career, Carro has been involved in many bar groups, associations, and committees, and in several instances was a founding member. As a young lawyer, he incorporated or organized the Hispanic or Latino Associations for a number of New York City Departments, such as the Fire Department of New York City. He has taught, lectured, and written on topics related to his practice. Carro was an adjunct professor with the City University of New York from 1972 to 1983, Bronx Community College from 1983 to 1984, Fordham University from 1980 to 1982, Staten Island College from 1977 to 1978 and Lehman College from 1973 to 1975.

Carro consistently turned down opportunities to teach at the law school level and instead preferred to teach at local New York colleges and speak at local high schools for the opportunity they provided to encourage his students to consider the law as a career choice. Carro taught a popular and comprehensive introduction to the law entitled, "The Criminal Justice System and Its Impact on the Poor" which did inspire many of his students to pursue a career in law. He spoke at DeWitt Clinton H.S. in the Bronx about the legal profession and inspired student Rolando Acosta, who later followed in Carro's footsteps and was appointed to the Appellate Division, First Department by Governor Eliot L. Spitzer.

He traveled worldwide as an independent legal observer for Amnesty International investigating human rights abuses. While serving in the Criminal Court, Judge Carro was named to a Presidential Task Force headed by Defense Secretary Melvin Laird to study racism and discrimination in the United States Armed Forces throughout the world. The task force consisted of top grade judge advocates from the Army, Navy, Air Force and Marines, including Generals and Admirals. Judge Carro, as requested by the Task Force, was given a year's leave of absence from the Criminal Court bench to work on the report and was given an equivalent rank of a 1 star general and a diplomatic passport. From this experience Carro developed an interest in international human rights. He has visited Chile and Argentina as part of a Task Force on the treatment of incarcerated citizens in those countries.

Other professional affiliations include:

- Founding member and former chairman of the Board of ASPIRA
- Chairman of the Board of the Latino Commission on AIDS
- Co-chairman of the Committee on Revision of the Criminal Law of the Criminal Justice Section of the N.Y.S. Bar Association (NYSBA)
- Member of the board of directors and founding member of the Puerto Rican Forum
- Board member and founding member of the Puerto Rican Legal Defense and Education Fund
- Past President, former board member and founding member of the Puerto Rican Bar Association
- Trustee, City University of New York School of Law
- Trustee, Legal Aid Society
- Trustee, Office of Appellate Defender
- Trustee, Boricua College
- Trustee, El Museo Del Barrio
- Trustee, Community Service Society of New York

== See also ==
- List of Hispanic and Latino American jurists
- New York State Supreme Court
