= Puerto Rican Bar Association =

Voluntary association of lawyers based in Brooklyn, New York, US

- Type: Legal society
- Location: Brooklyn, New York, U.S.
- Members: Around 500

The Puerto Rican Bar Association (PRBA) is a voluntary association of lawyers of Puerto Rican ethnicity or interest. It is to be distinguished from the Bar Association of Puerto Rico or Colegio de Abogados de Puerto Rico, which is the bar association of Puerto Rico.

== History ==
The earliest predecessor of today's PRBA was the Pan-American Lawyers' Association, organized around 1934. In the mid-1940s, the Spanish-American Bar Association was organized as a new organization which, in 1957, became the present day PRBA.

== See also ==
- Legal profession in Puerto Rico
