= Federal voting rights in Puerto Rico =

Voting rights of United States citizens who live in the U.S. territory of Puerto Rico, like the voting rights of residents of other U.S. territories, differ from those of United States citizens in each of the 50 states, as well as the District of Columbia. Residents of Puerto Rico and other U.S. territories do not have voting representation in the United States Congress, and are not entitled to electoral votes for president. The United States Constitution grants congressional voting representation to U.S. states, which Puerto Rico and other U.S. territories are not, specifying that members of Congress shall be elected by direct popular vote and that the president and the vice president shall be elected by electors chosen by the states. (Note: The Constitution originally mandated election by popular vote only for the House of Representatives, with Senators being chosen by State legislatures. The 17th amendment specified direct popular election for Senators.)

Puerto Rico is a territory under the sovereignty of the federal government, but is not part of any state nor is it a state itself. It has been organized (given a measure of self-rule by the Congress) subject to the Congress's plenary powers under the territorial clause of Article IV, sec. 3, of the U.S. Constitution. In the U.S. House of Representatives, Puerto Rico is entitled to a resident commissioner, a delegate who is not allowed to vote on the floor of the House but can vote on procedural matters and in House committees. In most other U.S. overseas (and historically pre-state) territories, as well as the District of Columbia, a similar representative position is styled Delegate.

The lack of direct voting representation in Congress for residents of the territory has been an issue since the U.S. Congress granted U.S. citizenship to Puerto Rico citizens in 1917. All judicial claims have been met with political or constitutional challenges; therefore, there has been no change in Puerto Rico's representation in the Congress or representation on the electoral college for the U.S. citizens residing in Puerto Rico.

Like other territories, Puerto Rico holds presidential primary elections in the spring of each presidential election year in which the parties choose delegates to the Republican and Democratic national conventions. While these delegates do vote for their pledged candidate at their respective convention, this marks the end of the territory's participation in the presidential election. U.S. citizens, including Puerto Ricans, can vote for president if they are registered to vote and reside in any of the 50 States or the District of Columbia

== Background ==
Puerto Rico is an insular area—a United States territory that is neither a part of one of the fifty states nor a part of the District of Columbia, the nation's federal district. Insular areas, including Puerto Rico, the U.S. Virgin Islands and Guam, are not allowed to choose electors in U.S. presidential elections or elect voting members of the U.S. Congress. Puerto Rico is by far the most populous of these insular areas, with a population of over 3 million, which is larger than mainland states like Iowa, Arkansas and Nevada that do enjoy voting rights.

This status grows out of Articles One and Two of the United States Constitution, which state that electors are to be chosen by "the People of the several States." In 1961, the 23rd amendment extended the right to choose electors to the District of Columbia; the insular areas, however, were not addressed in that Amendment.

== Inter-American Commission on Human Rights claim ==
On December 29, 2003, The Inter-American Commission on Human Rights of the Organization of American States concluded that the United States is responsible for violations of the District of Columbia's rights under Articles II and XX of the American Declaration of the Rights and Duties of Man by denying District of Columbia citizens an effective opportunity to participate in their federal legislature. On October 17, 2006, Pedro Rosselló, a former governor of Puerto Rico, and the Unfinished Business of American Democracy Committee on behalf of the approximately four million U.S. citizens residing in the Commonwealth of Puerto Rico, presented a petition to the Inter-American Commission on Human Rights of the Organization of American States seeking the Commission's aid in obtaining enfranchisement.

== Disenfranchisement in Puerto Rico ==
Any U.S. citizen who resides in Puerto Rico is effectively disenfranchised at the national level, as are all U.S. citizen residents of U.S. unincorporated territories. Although the Republican Party and Democratic Party chapters in Puerto Rico have selected voting delegates to the national nominating conventions participating in U.S. presidential primaries or caucuses, U.S. citizens without a voting residence in one of the 50 states or in the District of Columbia may not vote in federal elections.

Both the Puerto Rican Independence Party and the New Progressive Party reject the status quo that permits disenfranchisement (from their distinct respective positions on the ideal enfranchised status for the island-nation of Puerto Rico). The remaining political organization, the Popular Democratic Party, has officially stated that it favors fixing the remaining "deficits of democracy" that the Bill Clinton and George W. Bush administrations have publicly recognized in writing through reports of the President's Task Force on Puerto Rico's Status.

In 2003, attorney Gregorio Igartúa and others in a third round of litigation (Igartúa III) filed suit seeking to enfranchise U.S. citizens residents of Puerto Rico with the right to vote for the U.S. President and Vice President.

The U.S. Court of Appeals decision in 2005, on appeal of the decision in Igartúa III, Igartua-de la Rosa v. United States, 417 F.3d 145 (1st Cir. P.R. 2005), authored by Chief Judge Boudin, reads in part:

This case brings before this court the third in a series of law suits by Gregorio Igartúa, a U.S. citizen resident in Puerto Rico, claiming the constitutional right to vote quadrennially for President and Vice President of the United States. Panels of this court have rejected such claims on all three occasions. We now do so again, this time en banc, rejecting as well an adjacent claim: that the failure of the Constitution to grant this vote should be declared a violation of U.S. treaty obligations.

The constitutional claim is readily answered. Voting for President and Vice President of the United States is governed neither by rhetoric nor intuitive values but by a provision of the Constitution. This provision does not confer the franchise on "U.S. citizens" but on "Electors" who are to be "appoint[ed]" by each "State," in "such Manner" as the state legislature may direct, equal to the number of Senators and Representatives to whom the state is entitled. U.S. Const. art. II, § 1, cl. 2; see also id. amend. XII.

Judges Campbell and Lipez concurred in the decision. Judge Torruella dissented, opening his dissent as follows:

In its haste to "put [plaintiffs-appellants'] constitutional claim fully at rest," maj. op. at 6, the majority has chosen to overlook the issues actually before this en banc court as framed by the order of the rehearing panel, see Igartúa de la Rosa v. United States, 404 F.3d 1 (1st Cir. 2005) (order granting panel rehearing), which panel the en banc court suppressed, but whose order was adopted as establishing the parameters of the issues to be decided by the en banc court. See Igartúa de la Rosa v. United States, 407 F.3d 30, 31 (1st Cir. 2005) (converting to en banc review panel rehearing in which "the parties [are] to address two issues: first, the plaintiffs' claim that the United States was in default of its treaty obligations and, second, the availability of declaratory judgment concerning the government's compliance with any such obligations."). It is these issues that the parties were asked to brief. Instead the majority has sidetracked this appeal into a dead end that is no longer before us: Puerto Rico's lack of electoral college representation, see U.S. Const. art. II, § 1, cl. 2, and our lack of authority to order any constitutional change to such status by reason of that constitutional impediment.

In doing so, the majority fails to give any weight to the fundamental nature of the right to vote, and the legal consequences of this cardinal principal. Under the combined guise of alleged political question doctrine, its admitted desire to avoid "embarrassment" to the United States, and its pious lecturing on what it deems to be the nature of the judicial function, the majority seeks to avoid what I believe is its paramount duty over and above these stated goals: to do justice to the civil rights of the four million United States citizens who reside in Puerto Rico. The majority labels this duty with despect as "rhetoric" and "intuitive values." Maj. op. at 3. I beg to differ, and so, I suspect, do a considerable number of those four million U.S. citizens who, lacking any political recourse, look to the courts of the United States for succor because they are without any other avenue of relief. See United States v. Carolene Prods. Co., 304 U.S. 144, 152 n.4 (1938) ("[P]rejudice against discrete and insular minorities may be a special condition, which tends seriously to curtail the operation of those political processes ordinarily to be relied upon to protect minorities and . . . may call for correspondingly more searching judicial inquiry.").

== Igartúa v. United States ==
In 2008, attorney Gregorio Igartúa and others in a fourth round of litigation (Igartúa IV) attempted to bring a class action suit claiming they and other U.S. citizen-residents of Puerto Rico have a right to vote for a Representative to the U.S. House of Representatives from Puerto Rico and a right to have Representatives from Puerto Rico in that body.

The 2010 United States Court of Appeals for the First Circuit decision read in part:

The panel is unanimous in agreeing that the U.S. Constitution does not give Puerto Rico residents the right to vote for members of the House of Representatives because Puerto Rico is not a state.

Chief Judge Lynch and Judge Lipez conclude that this panel is bound by Igartúa III's holding that the Constitution does not permit granting such a right to the plaintiffs by means other than those specified for achieving statehood or by amendment. Chief Judge Lynch independently concludes that this holding in Igartúa III is correct. Judge Lipez considers the panel bound by this holding in Igartúa III, but he does not express a view of his own on its merit. Chief Judge Lynch and Judge Lipez agree that Igartúa III requires dismissal of plaintiffs' claims based on treaties and international law. Judge Lipez joins the holding that dismissal of the case is affirmed. He joins this introduction, the introduction to Section II, Sections II.A II.B, and II.C.1, and Section III of Chief Judge Lynch's opinion. He expresses additional views in his concurring opinion.

Lipez opened his concurrence opinion as follows:

Despite our court's 2005 en banc decision rejecting the right of Puerto Rico's four million residents to vote in presidential elections, the issue of federal voting rights for these longstanding United States citizens remains a compelling legal problem. The unequal distribution of the fundamental privilege of voting among different categories of citizens is deeply troubling and, not surprisingly, the legal arguments in favor of enfranchising Puerto Rico residents have continued to evolve. Although the en banc decision forecloses this panel's reconsideration of issues the full court resolved, that decision should not be the final word on the subject. Judge Torruella's dissent highlights important issues that deserve consideration in a new en banc proceeding. As I shall explain, if each of those issues were decided in plaintiffs' favor, United States citizens residing in Puerto Rico would have a viable claim to equal voting rights under the International Covenant on Civil and Political Rights ("ICCPR").

Thus, while I agree with Chief Judge Lynch that our panel must adhere to the precedent set five years ago by the en banc court on the constitutional and treaty interpretation issues addressed in the majority opinion, I cannot agree that the plaintiffs' claims should be dismissed without review by the full court. Given the magnitude of the issues and Judge Torruella's forceful analysis, this is one of those rare occasions when reconsideration of an en banc ruling is warranted.

Torruella opened his Opinion Concurring in Part and Dissenting in Part, as follows:

Although in a different format than presented on prior occasions, we once more have before us issues that arise by reason of the political inequality that exists within the body politic of the United States, as regards the four million citizens of this Nation who reside in Puerto Rico.

This is a fundamental constitutional question that will not go away notwithstanding this Court's repeated efforts to suppress these issues.21 We can now add to that dismal list the endeavors of the lead opinion. This is a most unfortunate and denigrating predicament for citizens who for more than one hundred years have been branded with a stigma of inferiority, and all that follows therefrom.

At the root of this problem is the unacceptable role of the courts. Their complicity in the perpetuation of this outcome is unconscionable. As in the case of racial segregation, see Plessy v. Ferguson, 163 U.S. 557 (1896) (overruled by Brown v. Bd. of Educ., 347 U.S. 482 (1954)), it is the courts that are responsible for the creation of this inequality. Furthermore, it is the courts that have clothed this noxious condition in a mantle of legal respectability.

But perhaps even more egregious is the fact that it is this judiciary that has mechanically parroted the outdated and retrograde underpinnings on which this invented inferiority is perpetuated. This result is now reached without so much as a minimum of analysis or consideration for the passage of time and the changed conditions, both legal and societal. These changed conditions have long undermined the foundations of these judge-made rules, which were established in a by-gone era in consonance with the distorted views of that epoch. Although the unequal treatment of persons because of the color of their skin or other irrelevant reasons, was then the modus operandi of governments, and an accepted practice of societies in general, the continued enforcement of these rules by the courts is today an outdated anachronism, to say the least. Such actions, particularly by courts of the United States, only serve to tarnish our judicial system as the standard-bearer of the best values to which our Nation aspires. Allowing these antiquated rules to remain in place, long after the unequal treatment of American citizens has become constitutionally, morally and culturally unacceptable in the rest of our Nation, see Brown v. Bd. of Educ., 347 U.S. 483, is an intolerable state of affairs which cannot be excused by hiding behind any theory of law.

In 1961, just a few years after the United Nations first ratified the ICCPR, the Twenty-third Amendment to the United States Constitution was passed, allowing United States citizens residing in the District of Columbia to vote for the executive offices. As of 2009 a bill was pending in Congress that would treat the District of Columbia as "a congressional district for purposes of representation in the House of Representatives", and permit United States citizens residing in the capital to vote for members of the House of Representatives. However, the United States has not taken similar steps with regard to the four million United States citizens and nationals who reside in the U.S. territories, of which close to three million are residents of Puerto Rico. In an opinion concurring in part and dissenting in part in a judicial decision, Circuit Judge Juan R. Torruella, who is Puerto Rican, wrote that this inaction is in clear violation of the United States' obligations under the ICCPR.

In August 2017, the en banc First Circuit rejected another lawsuit by Igartúa challenging Puerto Rico's exclusion from United States congressional apportionment, over the dissents of Judges Torruella, Kermit Lipez, and Ojetta Rogeriee Thompson.

== See also ==
- Elections in Puerto Rico
- Voting rights in the United States
- Uniformed and Overseas Citizens Absentee Voting Act
- District of Columbia voting rights
- Twenty-third Amendment to the United States Constitution
- Implications of Puerto Rico's current political status
