= Village Care of New York =

Charity in New York

VillageCare is a community-based, not-for-profit organization serving people with chronic care needs, as well as seniors and individuals in need of continuing care and rehabilitation services.

== History ==
VillageCare can trace its origins to their first nursing home on Hudson Street in Greenwich Village, New York. During the early 1970s the owner of the nursing home absconded with the funds. The state of New York intervened with the intention of closing the home and transferring the residents to other facilities outside of Greenwich Village. The residents of Greenwich Village rallied to keep the home operating wanting a nursing home in the village for its residents. Led by a core group the volunteers raised money. The largest single donation collected was $20. In fact, over 70% of the money collected was under $20. The group eventually raised enough money to buy the home and keep it running. During the late 1970s when HIV was only spoken about in whispers and called the "gay cancer" the same core group that helped to purchase the nursing home decided to split their focus and to start caring for the residents of Greenwich Village that were afflicted with HIV/AIDS. Once that focus was added VillageCare was formed.

In 2007, it was among over 530 New York City arts and social service institutions to receive part of a $20 million grant from the Carnegie Corporation, which was made possible through a donation by New York City mayor Michael Bloomberg.
