= Implications of Puerto Rico's political status =

The political status of Puerto Rico has ramifications into many spheres of Puerto Rican life, and there are limits to the level of autonomy the Puerto Rican government has. For example, the Island's government is not fully autonomous, and the level of federal presence in the Island is common place, including a branch of the United States Federal District Court. There are also implications relative to the American citizenship carried by people born in Puerto Rico. Specifically, although people born in the Commonwealth of Puerto Rico are natural born U.S. citizens, their citizenship is not protected by the Citizenship Clause of the 14th Amendment to the U.S. Constitution. As such, the American citizenship of Puerto Ricans can be taken away by the U.S. Congress unilaterally. (Note: "On March 2, 1917, Wilson signed the Jones-Shafroth Act, under which Puerto Rico became a U.S. territory and Puerto Ricans were granted statutory citizenship, meaning that citizenship was granted by an act of Congress and not by the Constitution (thus it was not guaranteed by the Constitution).") (Note: "The Insular Cases established that Puerto Rico belonged to, but was not part of the United States. It followed that persons born in Puerto Rico were not born in the United States for purposes of the Birthright Citizenship Clause of the 14th Amendment.") (Note: "There is also uniform recognition that one Congress cannot bind a future Congress, and because U.S. citizenship for Puerto Ricans is provided by federal law, each Congress can decide when and how U.S. citizenship for Puerto Rican can end.") (Note: "...the 'What Congress gives, Congress takes' doctrine in regard to the Puerto Rico territory.") Puerto Ricans are also covered by a group of "fundamental civil rights" but, since Puerto Rico is not a state, Puerto Ricans are not covered by the full American Bill of Rights. As for taxation, Puerto Ricans pay U.S. federal taxes (import/export taxes, commodity taxes, social security taxes, and medicare taxes, etc.), but most residents of the island are not required to file federal income tax returns. Representation-wise, Puerto Ricans have no voting representative in the U.S. Congress, but do have a Resident Commissioner who has a voice in Congress (but no vote except for committee-level voting). Puerto Ricans must also serve in the United States military anytime conscription is ordered, with the same duties as a US citizen residing in the 50 states.

== Degree of autonomy ==
Under the Constitution of Puerto Rico, Puerto Rico designates itself with the term Commonwealth and Puerto Ricans have a degree of administrative autonomy similar to citizens of a U.S. state and like the States, it has a republican form of government, organized pursuant to a constitution adopted by its people, and a bill of rights. The constitution, approved by the U.S. Congress, went into effect in 1952. In addition, like the States, Puerto Rico lacks "the full sovereignty of an independent nation," for example, the power to manage its "external relations with other nations," which was retained by the Federal Government.

Constitutionally, Puerto Rico is subject to the Congress' plenary powers under the territorial clause of Article IV, sec. 3, of the U.S. Constitution. U.S. federal law applies to Puerto Rico, even though Puerto Rico is not a state of the American Union and their residents have no voting representation in the U.S. Congress. Because of the establishment of the Federal Relations Act of 1950, all federal laws that are "not locally inapplicable" are automatically the law of the land in Puerto Rico. Following the 1950 and 1952 legislation, only two district court decisions have held that a particular federal law, which does not specifically exclude or treat Puerto Rico differently, is inapplicable to Puerto Rico. The more recent decision was vacated on appeal. Efrén Rivera Ramos, Dean and Professor of Law at the University of Puerto Rico School of Law, clarified the meaning of plenary powers, explaining, "The government of a state derives its powers from the people of the state, whereas the government of a territory owes its existence wholly to the United States. The Court thus seems to equate plenary power to exclusive power. The U.S. government could exert over the territory power that it could not exercise over the states." Ramos quotes Justice Harlan, writing in Grafton v. United States, 206 U.S. 333 (1907), "The jurisdiction and authority of the United States over that territory [referring to the Philippines] and its inhabitants, for all legitimate purposes of government is paramount,". Ramos then goes on to argue "This power, however, is not absolute, for it is restrained by some then-undefined fundamental rights possessed by anyone subject to the authority of the U.S. government."

== Citizenship ==
Since 1917, people born in Puerto Rico have been given U.S. citizenship. United States citizens residing in Puerto Rico, whether born there or not, are not residents of a state or the District of Columbia and, therefore, do not qualify to vote, personally or through an absentee ballot, in federal elections.

Puerto Ricans "were collectively made U.S. citizens" in 1917 as a result of the Jones–Shafroth Act. The act was signed into law by President Woodrow Wilson on March 2, 1917.

Clarification of federal law codified on U.S. Code Title 8 as 8 U.S.C. § 1402, approved by President Harry S. Truman on 27 June 1952, declared all persons born in Puerto Rico on or after 13 January 1941 to be U.S. citizens at birth and all persons born in Puerto Rico between 11 April 1899 and 12 January 1941, and meeting certain other technical requirements, and not citizens of the United States under any other Act, are declared to be citizens of the U.S. as of 13 January 1941.

In addition, an April 2000 report by the Congressional Research Service, asserts that citizens born in Puerto Rico are legally defined as natural-born citizens and are therefore eligible to be elected President, provided they meet qualifications of age and 14 years of residence within the United States. According to this report, residence in Puerto Rico and U.S. territories and possessions does not qualify as residence within the United States for these purposes.

== Rights of residents ==
Since Puerto Rico is an unincorporated territory (see above) and not a U.S. state, the United States Constitution does not fully enfranchise US citizens residing in Puerto Rico.

Only the "fundamental rights" under the federal constitution apply to Puerto Rico, including the Privileges and Immunities Clause (U.S. Constitution, Article IV, Section 2, Clause 1, also known as the Comity Clause) that prevents a state from treating citizens of other states in a discriminatory manner, with regard to basic civil rights. The clause also embraces a right to travel, so that a citizen of one state can have privileges and immunities in any other state; this constitutional clause regarding the rights, privileges, and immunities of citizens of the United States was expressly extended to Puerto Rico by the U.S. Congress through the federal law codified on the Title 48 of the United States Code as 48 U.S.C. § 737 and signed by President Truman in 1947. The Supreme Court has indicated that once the Constitution has been extended to an area (by Congress or the Courts), its coverage is irrevocable. 'To hold that the political branches may switch the Constitution on or off at will would lead to a regime in which they, not this Court, say "what the law is." '.

Other fundamental rights such as the Eleventh Amendment and the Dormant Commerce Clause were expressly extended by the United States Court of Appeals for the First Circuit, and the First Amendment, Fourth Amendment, Fifth Amendment, the due process clause and the equal protection guarantee of the Fourteenth Amendment were expressly extended to Puerto Rico by the U.S. Supreme Court.

In a brief concurrence in the judgment of Torres v. Puerto Rico, Supreme Court Justice Brennan argued that any implicit limits from the Insular Cases on the basic rights granted by the Constitution (including especially the Bill of Rights) were anachronistic in the 1970s.

== Judiciary ==
Article Three of the United States Constitution establishes the judicial branch of the federal government. This article was expressly extended to the United States District Court for the District of Puerto Rico by the U.S. Congress through Federal Law 89-571, 80 Stat. 764, signed by President Lyndon B. Johnson in 1966. After that date, judges appointed to the Puerto Rico federal district court have been Article III judges appointed under the Constitution of the United States. In addition, in 1984 one of the judges of the federal district court, Chief Judge Juan R. Torruella, a native of the island, was appointed to serve in the United States Court of Appeals for the First Circuit with jurisdiction over Puerto Rico, Massachusetts, Rhode Island, Maine, and New Hampshire.

In Puerto Rico v. Sanchez Valle (2016) the U.S. Supreme Court found that the Double Jeopardy Clause of the United States Constitution forbids successive criminal prosecutions by the Commonwealth and the Federal Government because they are not separate sovereigns.

== Federal presence ==
Federal executive branch agencies have significant presence in Puerto Rico, just as in any state, such as the U.S. Attorney, U.S. Customs and Border Protection, Drug Enforcement Administration, Environmental Protection Agency, Equal Employment Opportunity Commission, Federal Bureau of Investigation, Federal Emergency Management Agency, Homeland Security, U.S. Immigration and Customs Enforcement, Internal Revenue Service, U.S. Marshals Service, National Labor Relations Board, U.S. Postal Service, Social Security Administration, and Transportation Security Administration. The island's economic, commercial, and banking systems are integrated to those of the United States.

== Taxation and financial affairs ==
The U.S. Government classifies Puerto Rico as an independent taxation authority by Federal Law codified on the Title 48 of the United States Code as 48 U.S.C. § 734. Puerto Rico residents are required to pay U.S. federal taxes, import/export taxes, federal commodity taxes, social security taxes etc. Individuals working with the Federal Government pay federal income taxes while the rest of the residents are required to pay federal payroll taxes (Social Security and Medicare), as well as Commonwealth of Puerto Rico income taxes. All federal employees, plus those who do business with the federal government, in addition to Puerto Rico-based corporations that intend to send funds to the U.S., and some others also pay federal income taxes. In 2009, Puerto Rico paid $3.742 billion into the US Treasury. That was more than paid by the state of Vermont, and about the same as paid by the states of Wyoming, Montana, and North Dakota. It was also over six times more than all U.S. Armed Service members overseas and all other U.S. territories combined.

Because residents of Puerto Rico pay into Social Security, they are eligible for Social Security benefits upon retirement, but are excluded from the Supplemental Security Income (SSI), and the island actually receives less than 15% of the Medicaid funding it would normally receive if it were a U.S. state. Yet Medicare providers receive less-than-full state-like reimbursements for services rendered to beneficiaries in Puerto Rico, even though the latter paid fully into the system.

Governor Alejandro García Padilla signed legislation which would have allowed corporations owned by the Commonwealth to declare bankruptcy. However, in Puerto Rico v. Franklin California Tax-Free Trust (2016), the U.S. Supreme Court, by a vote of 5–2, found the legislation was void because it was preempted by the U.S. Bankruptcy Code, with Justice Sonia Sotomayor dissenting. On 30 June 2016, President Barack Obama signed the PROMESA into law, which empowered him to appoint a seven-member Financial Oversight and Management Board that has ultimate control over the Commonwealth's budget. In 2017, the U.S. Government Accountability Office estimated that Puerto Rico-based corporations paid $1.42 billion in taxes. Had Puerto Rico been a state, such Puerto Rico-based corporations would have paid an estimated $5 billion-to-$9.3 billion.

In May 2023, the United States Supreme Court ruled against Centro de Periodismo Investigativo, a Puerto Rican media organization, in its quest to obtain documents from the Federal Council to oversee the island's financial restructuring. The judges said that Congress has not been clear enough about lifting the Board of Financial Supervision and Management's sovereign immunity, which would allow Centro de Periodismo Investigativo Inc. to subpoena the board over documents related to the restructuring of the economy of Puerto Rico.

== Political participation ==
Since 1961, several Puerto Ricans have been appointed by the President, upon the advice and consent of the Senate to serve as United States Ambassadors to Venezuela, Spain, Costa Rica, Chile, the Dominican Republic, and the Republics of Mauritius and Seychelles. A Puerto Rican was also appointed by President Obama as ambassador to El Salvador. Pending the advice and consent of the United States Senate, the President issued a recess appointment so that the Ambassador could assume her post. As embassies fall within the Department of State, ambassadors answer to the Secretary of State.

Puerto Rico also participates in the primary process of the Democratic and Republican parties of the United States, is accorded a proportional representation in both parties, and local delegates vote during each party's national convention.

== Military service ==
Puerto Ricans may enlist in the U.S. military. Since 1917, Puerto Ricans have been included in the compulsory draft whenever it has been in effect and more than 400,000 Puerto Ricans have served in the United States Armed Forces. Puerto Ricans have participated in all U.S. wars since 1898, most notably World War I, World War II, the Korean and Vietnam wars, as well as the current Middle Eastern conflicts. Several Puerto Ricans became notable commanders, five have been awarded the Medal of Honor, the highest military decoration in the United States, and several Puerto Ricans have attained the rank of General or Admiral, which requires a presidential nomination and Senate confirmation, as is the case of judges and ambassadors. In World War II, the Korean War and the Vietnam War Puerto Ricans were the most decorated Hispanic soldiers and in some cases were the first to die in combat.
