= Bar Association of Puerto Rico =

Professional association in Puerto Rico

The Bar Association of Puerto Rico
- Colegio de Abogados de Puerto Rico
- Type: Legal Society
- Headquarters: San Juan, PR
- Location: Puerto Rico
- Website: www.capr.org

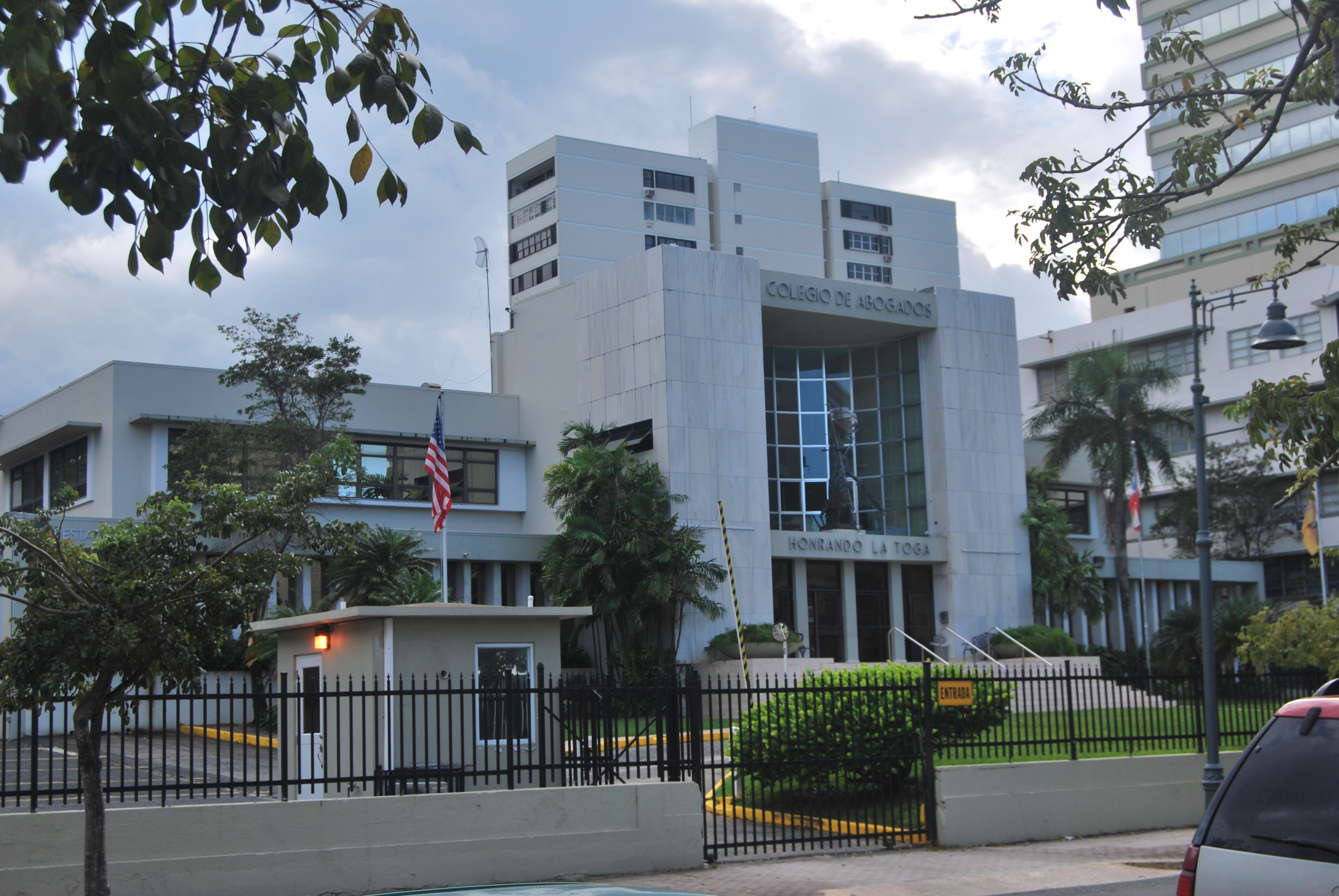
Bar Association of Puerto Rico headquarters in Santurce

The Bar Association of Puerto Rico (BAPR) or Colegio de Abogados de Puerto Rico (CAPR) is the bar association of Puerto Rico. It is the oldest professional association in Puerto Rico, and among the oldest bar associations in the world.

The Bar Association of Puerto Rico is to be distinguished from the Puerto Rican Bar Association, which is a private association.

== History ==
Although Puerto Rico was part of Spain, a country with associations of lawyers as early as the 16th century, it was not until May 8, 1840, that the Royal Court of Puerto Rico issued an order authorizing the establishment of a Bar Association there. There were at the time 22 lawyers practicing in Puerto Rico. Its first bar examination was given on May 13, 1841. The Bar Association published the first book of the law of the Royal Court of Puerto Rico in 1857.

Bar operations were suspended when, following the surrender of Puerto Rico to the United States at the end of the Spanish–American War, the Military Government suppressed the profession of Attorney.

After the Statute of the Bar Association of Puerto Rico was restored, debate ensued among Bar members as to the correct structure of the Bar, due to the transition from Spanish colony to Commonwealth of the United States. The Puerto Rico Bar Association changed in 1911 to be a voluntary association similar to that in many States.

In 1932, following lengthy discussion, the voluntary association was converted to a mandatory association; since then all practicing attorneys must be members in order to practice law in the United States territory of Puerto Rico, with a number of exceptions, e.g., Federal judges may voluntarily withdraw from the organization.

== Structure ==
The Bar Association, headquartered in the Miramar section of San Juan, Puerto Rico operates a number of programs, including a pro bono legal services program, offers life insurance to its members and makes its meeting rooms available to community organizations.

The association is managed by a governing board, which has met regularly for over 130 years.

The association holds its annual convention in the month of September, when its president and board of directors are elected by those physically present.

Legislation has been approved, converting it into a voluntary membership organization. Other bills have been filed to allow the election of the president by mail-in referendum, rather than an assembly where physical presence is required.

== Criticism ==
Many criticize the bar because, notwithstanding its compulsory nature, it shows an activist tendency towards political matters, openly supporting specific candidates during elections. They believe that a compulsory, government-sponsored institution such as itself should maintain a politically neutral position, so as not to offend its members or taint the institution's honor by involving itself in petty politics.

The bar's compulsory membership has also come under intense scrutiny because of concerns that it violates the First Amendment. In 2009, the Puerto Rico Legislative Assembly passed a law mandating that membership in the Bar Association would thereafter be voluntary, and although the Bar Association filed suit to challenge the law, the Puerto Rico Court of Appeals upheld the law's constitutionality; subsequently, the Puerto Rico Supreme Court and the United States Supreme Court each decided in succession not to hear the case on the merits, which had the effect of leaving intact the Puerto Rico Court of Appeals' ruling upholding the law.

More recently, on July 28, 2014, the Puerto Rico Legislative Assembly passed a new statute that, among other things, repealed the 2009 statute and reinstated the requirement of mandatory bar membership. On the same day that the law was signed by the Governor, a local senator filed a lawsuit in the Puerto Rico Court of First Instance challenging the law's constitutionality. Two days later, the Puerto Rico Supreme Court granted the senator's motion for intra-jurisdictional certification and agreed to take up the case directly, thus removing it from the trial court's docket and setting an expedited briefing schedule.

== See also ==
- Legal profession in Puerto Rico
