= Section 515 Rural Rental Housing =

Section 515 Rural Rental Housing is a USDA rural housing program authorized under Section 515 of the Housing Act of 1949 (42 U.S.C. 1485). The Rural Housing Service (RHS) is authorized to make loans to provide rental housing for low- and moderate-income families in rural areas. Though rarely used for this purpose, Section 515 loans may also be used for congregate housing for the elderly and handicapped. Loans under the Section 515 program are made to individuals, corporations, associations, trusts, partnerships, or public agencies. The loans are made at market interest rates, but are subsidized with an interest credit subsidy that brings the effective rate of the loan to 1%. Loans are amortized for up to 50 years and have terms of 30 to 50 years depending on when the loan was made.
