= Welfare in New York =

Overview of welfare in the U.S. State of New York

This article is intended to give an overview of the welfare system in the U.S. State of New York.

== Food Stamps (SNAP) ==
Under the federal Supplemental Nutrition Assistance Program (SNAP), formerly known as the Food Stamp program, low income individuals and families are provided financial assistance for purchasing food. This may also include Emergency Food Assistance and Expedited Benefits.

== Temporary Assistance / Cash Assistance ==
The Welfare Reform Act of 1997 (the state response to the federal Personal Responsibility and Work Opportunity Act of 1996) created two programs, Family Assistance (FA) and Safety Net Assistance (SNA), to be state-directed and county-administered implementations of the constitutional mandate to aid, care and support the needy.

=== Family Assistance (FA) ===
In the Family Assistance (FA) program, the state implementation of the federal Temporary Aid to Needy Families Program (TANF), eligible families may receive up to 60 months of cash assistance.

=== Safety Net Assistance (SNA) ===
Under the Safety Net Assistance (SNA) program, single individuals without children, and families who have already received cash assistance for 60 months, may receive benefits. An individual or family may receive SNA for up to 24 months unless exempt from work requirements or HIV-positive, after which the local government directly pays rent and utilities with a small cash allowance.

== Medicaid / Child Health Plus ==
NY State of Health is the state health insurance marketplace and also determines eligibility for Medicaid and Child Health Plus.

== Child nutrition programs ==
The federal Food and Nutrition Service has several programs, administered by state agencies, that help fight hunger and obesity by reimbursing organizations such as schools, child care centers, and after-school programs for providing healthy meals to children:

- National School Lunch Program,
- School Breakfast Program,
- Child and Adult Care Food Program,
- Summer Food Service Program,
- Fresh Fruit and Vegetable Program, and
- Special Milk Program.

== See also ==
- Welfare in the United States
- Welfare in California
- Welfare in Puerto Rico
