= Elections in Puerto Rico =

Elections in Puerto Rico are guaranteed by Article Six of the Constitution of Puerto Rico and the Electoral Code of Puerto Rico for the 21st Century Act. All processes are overseen and managed in whole by the Puerto Rico State Elections Commission; an autonomous agency of the executive branch of the government of Puerto Rico.

== Types of elections ==
Three types of electoral processes can take place in Puerto Rico: general elections, referendum (a.k.a. plebiscites), and special elections. General elections are held every four years on the first Tuesday after the first Monday of November, on the same day as the U.S. presidential election on Election Day. During these elections the people of Puerto Rico elect both local and central government candidates. These include the governor, resident commissioner, members of the legislative assembly, including senators and representatives, mayors, and municipal assembly representatives. Referendums can occur after a law has been enacted calling for a one. Special elections occur when an unexpected vacancy occurs on a post or for other similar matters.

Due to the political status of Puerto Rico, it being a U.S. territory instead of a U.S. state, U.S. citizens residing in Puerto Rico can not vote for their head of state, the President of the United States. Furthermore, the resident commissioner is a non-voting member of the U.S. House of Representatives, and Puerto Rico does not have any representation in the U.S. Senate. The resident commissioner is also the only member of the House of Representatives who serves a four-year term instead of a two-year term, and therefore Puerto Rico does not participate in the U.S. midterm elections.

== Requirements ==
Only American citizens (including Puerto Rican citizens) who meet all of the following requirements may vote: be a legal resident of Puerto Rico, be at least 18 years old by the date of the election, must have been qualified by the Puerto Rico State Commission on Elections before the election or on the very same day of the election after he presents himself to his nearest place of voting and shows proper documentation, and must have not been declared mentally incapacitated by a court.

== Processes ==
Citizens cast their votes in colleges (Spanish: Escuelas) which are simply usually the nearest public school to where the voter declared as residence. Citizens are required by law to vote in secret, unless they have a physical impairment that does not allow them to. Those unable to travel to colleges due to medical impairments may vote at their place of residence (homes, elder homes, etc.) or wherever they are convalescing (hospitals, clinics, etc.). In both of these extraordinary cases, officials from the Puerto Rico State Commission on Elections will provide aid so that the citizens can cast their vote—either by using verbal or non-verbal communication—with members from the different political parties required to observe the process in order to ensure accuracy, fairness, transparency, order, and legitimacy.

Ballots are published in both English and Spanish regardless of whether English is an official language or not. (Note: English has been removed as an official language several times throughout Puerto Rico's modern history, but ballots must be published in English too regardless.)

=== General elections ===
At the central government's level, Puerto Rican elects a governor and a legislature. The island's governor is elected for a four-year term by the people. The Legislative Assembly (Asamblea Legislativa in Spanish) has two chambers: the Chamber of Representatives (Cámara de Representantes in Spanish) and the Senate (Senado in Spanish) which is elected for a four-year term concurrently with the governor.

For the last several decades, three political parties have been present on the ballot, the PIP, the PNP, and the PPD, which two of the three parties dominating the results of the elections. In the 2008 elections, a fourth party participated, the Puertorriqueños por Puerto Rico (PPR). In 2012 six parties participated, the same four as in 2008 and two new ones: Partido del Pueblo Trabajador (PPT), and Movimiento Union Soberanista (MUS). In 2016, 2 independent candidates ran for governor, while the MUS and the PPR did not have any candidates running.

=== 2020 reform ===
In 2020, a new electoral code was proposed which would expand access to absentee ballots and transition Puerto Rico to online voting by 2028. After receiving opposition, the online voting provisions were removed from the final bill. Governor Wanda Vázquez Garced signed the new electoral code into law on June 21, 2020.

== Electoral system ==
The Senate of Puerto Rico currently has 27 members, including 16 members elected from 8 two-seat electoral districts through plurality at large (each Senate district comprises 5 House districts), plus 11 at-large members. The House of Representatives of Puerto Rico currently (2019) has 51 members composed of 40 members elected in single-seat electoral districts using first-past-the-post, plus 11 at-large members.

In each house, 11 at-large members are elected from an island-wide district based on single non-transferable vote. To avoid vote splitting, the two major parties will typically nominate only 6 members and smaller parties typically only nominate one. Additionally, parties may choose the ballot order of its candidates in different districts, in an attempt to signal to voters the preferred method of voting. However, each voter is free to choose any candidate.

As the electoral system is majoritarian (the largest party gets a windfall of seats, surplus to its vote share), the section 7 of Article III of the Puerto Rican constitution s:Constitution of the Commonwealth of Puerto Rico allows for additional members to be added to either chamber to enhance the opposition party's representation. Members of the opposition will be added to provide a maximum of 17 and 9 members of the House and Senate, respectively (one third of the original size). In the last election, 2 and 3 members were added to the House and Senate, respectively.

When the majority party polls less than two-thirds of the vote for Governor of Puerto Rico, minority seats in the Senate or the House are distributed using a variant of the Hare quota largest remainder method according to the minority parties' share of the vote for governor, subject to a 3% threshold. A slightly different procedure is provided for in the event the majority party wins more than two-thirds of the vote for governor, which limits each minority party to a number of seats not in excess of its proportionate share of its vote for governor (excluding rounding differences). Additional seats assigned to a minority party first go to defeated at-large candidates with the largest vote totals, and then, if necessary, to district candidates with the largest proportion of the vote who have not been elected (sometimes called the "best loser" system).

== See also ==
- Electoral reform in Puerto Rico
- Politics of Puerto Rico
- Political party strength in Puerto Rico
- List of political parties in Puerto Rico
