= Nutrition Assistance for Puerto Rico =

United States federal aid program

Agency overview
- Formed: August 13, 1981; 44 years ago
- Preceding agency: Supplemental Nutrition Assistance Program
- Jurisdiction: executive branch
- Headquarters: San Juan, Puerto Rico
- Parent department: U.S. Department of Agriculture; Puerto Rico Department of Family Affairs
- Parent agency: Administration for the Socioeconomic Development of the Family
- Key documents: Pub. L. 97–35; Law No. 171 of 1968; Regulation No. 7280 of 2007; Regulation No. 8684 of 2015
- Website: servicios.adsef.pr.gov/views/programa/programaAsistenciaNutricional.aspx

Nutrition Assistance for Puerto Rico —Spanish: Programa de Asistencia Nutricional popularly known in Puerto Rico as Cupones (English: Food Stamps)— is a federal assistance nutritional program provided by the United States Department of Agriculture (USDA) solely to Puerto Rico. In 2021, over $2 billion USD was appropriated as a block grant for NAP to assist over 1 million impoverished residents of Puerto Rico. It is based on, though not part of, the USDA's national Supplemental Nutrition Assistance Program (SNAP) which in 2018 provided $64 billion in nutritional assistance to 42 million people in the 50 U.S. states, D.C., Guam and the US Virgin Islands.

Since its inception in 1982, the program has been providing low-income families, living in Puerto Rico, with cash for food purchases. It is a collaborative effort between the USDA and the island's government, where the former provides annual federal appropriations for the Puerto Rican government to distribute individually among eligible participants. Although the methods of providing such benefits have changed over the years, the program's basic objective of helping low-income families meet their nutritional needs has remained constant.

It has received criticism especially when federal reviews and assessments revealed deficiencies in its operations and management, requiring the implementation of various changes, including increased scrutiny. It has also attracted both criticism and advocacy from Puerto Rico and the United States over its effectiveness in helping poor families, and its impact on Puerto Rico's social classes and economy.

== History ==
Food stamps have been issued in the United States since World War II, but the program did not include Puerto Rico until the early 1970s, when U.S. Public Laws 91-671 of January 11, 1971 and 93-86 of November 1, 1974 partially extended the Food Stamp Program to U.S. territories. The Food Stamp program was later expanded to provide full coverage and benefits to Puerto Rico and other territories under Section 19 of the Food Stamp Act of 1977.

By 1977, the Food Stamp Program in Puerto Rico was larger, in terms of both the percentage of the population participating and expenditures, than any of the programs operating in the 50 U.S. States, with 56% of the Puerto Rican population participating in the program. In total, it accounted for approximately 8 percent of the national program's beneficiaries, and its operations and benefits awarded accounted for 8 percent of the national program's total federal expenditures.

To address these issues, the 1981 Omnibus Budget Reconciliation Act (OBRA) eliminated Puerto Rico from the national Food Stamp program and created the Nutrition Assistance Program (NAP) for Puerto Rico as a block grant to provide more administrative flexibility to the Commonwealth while reducing Federal expenditures. After a year of studies and design, it commenced operations on July 1, 1982 with an annual appropriation of $825 million. The new block grant program differed significantly from the former Food Stamp program in three major ways. First, the new NAP program was designed to distribute the benefits through physical checks, ensuring that the benefit would be payable only to the beneficiary while at the same time reducing administrative costs, since the former physical vouchers (cupones in Spanish) were subject to storage and accountability problems, theft, counterfeiting and even trafficking. Second, the benefits were no longer restricted to vouchers redeemable only for food, but were provided in cash. The beneficiary could then elect to purchase a product or select services other than food. Third, the overall assistance provided to Puerto Rico was limited to an annual block appropriation, requiring the Puerto Rican government to adjust its program management to allocate the funds. Between 1982 and 1986, the U.S. Congress awarded $825 million annually in block grants for the NAP program, and since then the appropriations have steadily increased by an estimated 3% to 4% to compensate for inflation. In 1989, the $852.7 million NAP payments to island residents made up almost 20% of all US federal money transfers to Puerto Rico that year. It has surpassed $1 billion annually since the early 1990s, and increased 30% from 1993 to 2002. Since fiscal year 2006, the appropriation has reached over $1.5 billion annually. NAP appropriations were $1.9 billion in Fiscal Year 2020, and more than $2 billion in Fiscal Year 2021.

=== Participation rate ===
Over the years there had been a gradual decline in participation in NAP. While the participation rate in the previous Food Stamp program was estimated at 56% (more than 1.5 million island residents), by 1994, participation in the NAP program had decreased to 1.3 million residents, and by 2006 it had decreased to just over 1 million. In contrast, the Puerto Rican population had steadily increased throughout those same periods.

However, the participation rate increased to 1.3 million in 2018, which was 40% of Puerto Rico's population. Perhaps as a consequence of Hurricane Maria in 2017 and the prolonged recession in Puerto Rico (which began in 2006), NAP had become fundamental in addressing poverty in Puerto Rico.

In 2018, more than 800,000 seniors living in Puerto Rico and over half of Puerto Rico's children, were receiving nutritional assistance through NAP.

=== Criticism ===
Since its creation, the program received much criticism both within and outside Puerto Rico. Critics argue that, since the program provides non-taxable income without any employment requirements, recipients receive free money without incentives for work, which hinders the economic output and development of the island, especially when Puerto Rico's employment participation and unemployment rates have been consistently inferior to U.S. national levels, while the average aid provided in Puerto Rico has exceeded the U.S. national average ($94 versus $74.79, respectively; 2001 estimate). People from the Dominican Republic do many of the jobs in Puerto Rico that pay too little to attract the locals. However, proponents of the program argue that Puerto Rico's social condition is in far worse shape than any of the 50 U.S. states. Approximately half of the island's population lives below the U.S. Federal poverty guidelines, and many have difficulties in meeting their nutritional needs due to increasing inflation and economic stagnation in the island. Furthermore, the relation between the NAP benefits and the low employment participation and high unemployment rates has not been studied, and there is no consensus on their actual causes.

After Hurricanes Irma and Maria in 2017, NAP received some extra funding. In 2021, the Puerto Rico representative in the United States House of Representatives, Resident Commissioner Jenniffer González, and others, stated people in Puerto Rico would be better off if Puerto Rico were participating in SNAP, an entitlement program, versus NAP, a block grant program. González sought to have Puerto Rico participate in SNAP (what the U.S. states, D.C., Guam and the US Virgin Islands have for nutritional assistance) rather than NAP, with its cap and more stringent eligibility requirements.

== Program administration ==
The Food and Nutrition Service (FNS), a component of the USDA, provides the funds to the Government of Puerto Rico's Department of Family Affairs to operate the program through an annual block grant, which covers the full cost of the benefits to participants, as well as fifty percent (50%) of the costs required to administer the program (the remaining 50% must be provided by the government of Puerto Rico). Although federal regulations require Puerto Rico to pay the benefits during the year for which the annual block grant was awarded, since 2002 the federal government has allowed Puerto Rico to use 2% of an annual surplus for benefits in future years.

As a condition of receiving the grant, the P.R. Department of the Family must submit an annual plan of operation to the FNS, which describes how it will distribute the funds assigned as nutrition assistance to qualifying persons. This includes identifying the island population which is eligible for the NAP benefits (i.e., family income limits, family status limits, etc.), establishing the process in which individual participants are selected, and the process of determining the benefit amount for each participant. The plan of operation is reviewed and approved by the FNS before funds are disbursed.

The Puerto Rico Department of the Family currently provides the benefits to each participating family through a debit card, which replaced the physical checks in the early 2000s. The monthly benefit is deposited through an electronic benefit transfer (EBT) system into a government-designated personal bank account, which can be accessed at any time with the debit card to withdraw cash or to make food purchases from authorized retailers. Since September 2001, 75% of each family's monthly benefit had been designated exclusively for making direct food and grocery purchases, while the remaining 25% could have been withdrawn as a cash benefit. The ability to withdraw a percentage of benefits in cash was phased out over a few years and currently benefits are available only by using EBT card at approved merchants for direct food and grocery purchases. The EBT debit card system has improved the program's payment accuracy rate to 96.4% in 2003, 4 years ahead of its 2007 goal of 95% accuracy.

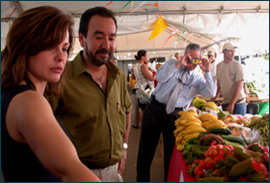
FNS and Puerto Rican representatives inspect a marketplace in San Juan. Both entities meet periodically to discuss the program.

The FNS also requires the government of Puerto Rico to submit financial and performance reports on a regular basis, including quarterly Federal Cash Transactions Reports, quarterly and annual Financial Status Reports, and monthly Program Participation and Benefits Reports. These reports provide details on the program's obligations and actual expenditures, and help the FNS monitor the use of program funds and reconcile the program's budget with actual expenditures.

=== Management assessment ===
In a collaborative effort by the United States Office of Management and Budget (OMB) and various other Federal agencies, the NAP program was assessed in 2005 and given a 44% and 40% score (out of a possible 100%) in its Program Management and Program Results/Accountability performance indicators, respectively, stating that "the program's financial management practices need improvement." The assessment revealed that Puerto Rico's government has not established short-term goals, objectives, and targets to evaluate the program's performance and results, that the program's oversight has been lax in previous years, and that the program's impact and results in Puerto Rico's society have not been evaluated in recent years. The financial management and oversight concerns were later emphasized when, on March 15, 2007, a U.S. investigative task force uncovered a $30 million fraud scheme involving 31 participants, including retailers and beneficiaries, who were withdrawing the funds as cash from the benefits designated exclusively for food purchases, and charging the customers a 20% to 25% fee for the transaction.

The Puerto Rico departments of the Family, Education, and Health have since combined efforts to create a 5-year strategic plan to improve the program's long-term performance and financial management. The Family Department has recently implemented a quality control-like program titled Measure of Efforts and Results System, which evaluates the quality and promptitude of services while reviewing various eligibility elements, to improve customer services and program management. The Department has also agreed to switch from a biennial audit to an annual Single Audit, and subject the program to periodic audits by its Administration for Socio-Economic Development, to detect and correct problems more quickly. Furthermore, the USDA's Office of Inspector General (OIG) has performed regular audits to assure compliance and identify areas for improvement.

Regardless of deficiencies, the federal government's assessment revealed that the current NAP program is actually an improvement over the former Food Stamp program provided in Puerto Rico. In its 2005 assessment report, it concluded:

The [Nutrition Assistance for Puerto Rico] block grant is successful in two respects compared to the Food Stamp Program that it replaced and consistent with its legislative origins: First, it substantially reduced Federal costs (by more than $500 million a year) compared to the Food Stamp Program it replaced. Second, it substantially reduced the percentage of the Commonwealth's population that receives assistance, from 56 percent in 1981 to 26 percent in 2004.

== Program benefits ==
Under the NAP, participating families receive monthly cash benefits to supplement their incomes which must be used at locations certified by the government, to purchase foods for preparation and consumption at home. In order to qualify for the program, potential beneficiaries must meet several conditions, listed as follows:

- be living in Puerto Rico
- maintain a maximum bank balance (all checking and savings accounts combined) of:
  - $2,000 if responsible for one or more persons age 60 or younger, or
  - $3,000 if responsible for one or more persons age 61 or older and
- have an annual household income that does not exceed the predefined income limits set by the Puerto Rico government

The amount of a family's monthly benefit payment depends on that family's specific characteristics and financial circumstances, as well as the overall amount of program funds available for distribution. It is the Puerto Rico government's responsibility to establish the eligibility requirements and benefit levels for participation in the program. The benefits are revised annually every October 1 to consider the nutritional needs of Puerto Rico's impoverished population, analyze the impact of inflation in Puerto Rico, and plan the distribution of available funds accordingly.

=== Impact ===
Average nutrition assistance benefits in the U.S.
Location	Average Monthly Benefits (2003)	Median Household Income (2000)
50 States	$84	$41,994
American Samoa	$103	$18,219
Washington, D.C.	$92	$40,127
Guam	$186	$39,317
Northern Mariana Is.	$79	$22,898
Puerto Rico	$103	$14,412
U.S. Virgin Islands	$119	$24,704

Since the program started in 1982, only three formal studies over the nutritional impact of the benefits provided to each family have been publicly released, in 1985, 1993, and 1996, respectively. All studies were designed to analyze the impact of the program with respect to the previous food stamps program, focusing on changes in household nutrient availability, while the 1985 and 1993 studies also focused on changes in household food expenditures (the amount of money households spent on acquiring food).

The first and most widely recognized study, published by Mathematica Policy Research, Inc. in 1985, found that the NAP program increased household food expenditures for beneficiaries when compared to non-participating families, just as its predecessor did. It also found that the program had the same relevant impact on increasing household food expenditures as the previous food stamp program, however this has been contested by subsequent studies performed on the national food stamp program, which found that "stamp" or "coupon"-type benefits are more effective at increasing food expenditures than direct "cash" benefits. The 1993 study, which also researched the impact on household expenditures, formed a completely different conclusion: that the average beneficiaries under the NAP program spent $5 less per week on food than non-participating families, considering if both would have the same amount of resources available. Nevertheless, this conclusion has also been questioned by subsequent research, attributing this result on the author's determination of the population sample.

All studies revealed minor improvements in household nutrient availability, with the 1985 study revealing an improvement of vitamin and mineral consumption over non-participating families and the 1993 study partially confirming these results. The most extensive study on nutrient availability was published in 1996, which concluded that nutrition did not change significantly after the implementation of the NAP program for all beneficiaries, however most improvements were noted for very low-income beneficiaries versus their non-participating equivalents.

Although these three studies have been used by the federal government and other entities to understand the impact of the NAP program's benefits, the data used by the authors dates back to the periods between 1977 and 1984, providing limited relevant information for the current program of today. Additionally, subsequent research and analysis have revealed insufficiencies in the methodology applied by the authors of all three publications, thereby casting doubt on whether a definitive conclusion of the program's overall impact has been established. A 2004 report published by USDA's Economic Research Service evaluated the reliability and relevancy of these studies, concluding that they are not sufficient to determine the program's current impact and performance, and stating:

The available information on the nutrition-related impacts of the NAP (in Puerto Rico) must be considered to be both limited and dated ... Any serious understanding of current impacts of the NAP on participants' nutrition and health status will clearly require new research. The existing national survey of health and nutrition status does not include Puerto Rico or the Pacific Islands. Consequently, a specialized data collection will be required to address questions about the nutrition- and health-related impacts of the NAP.
