= Law of Puerto Rico =

The legal system of Puerto Rico is a mix of the civil law and the common law systems.

== Language ==
Puerto Rico is the only current U.S. jurisdiction whose legal system operates primarily in a language other than American English: namely, Spanish. Because the U.S. federal government operates primarily in English, Puerto Rican attorneys are typically bilingual to litigate in English in U.S. federal courts and to litigate federal preemption issues in Puerto Rican courts.

== Sources ==
=== United States Code ===
Title 48 of the United States Code outlines the role of the United States Code in United States territories and insular areas such as Puerto Rico.

=== Leyes de Puerto Rico ===
Many of the Laws of Puerto Rico (Leyes de Puerto Rico) are modeled after the Spanish Civil Code, which is part of the Law of Spain. After the U.S. government assumed control of Puerto Rico in 1901, it initiated legal reforms resulting in the adoption of codes of criminal law, criminal procedure, and civil procedure modeled after those then in effect in California. Although Puerto Rico has since followed the federal example of transferring criminal and civil procedure from statutory law to rules promulgated by the judiciary, several portions of its criminal law still reflect the influence of the California Penal Code.

== Judicial system ==
The judicial branch is headed by the Chief Justice of the Puerto Rico Supreme Court, which is the only appellate court required by the Constitution. All other courts are created by the Legislative Assembly of Puerto Rico.

As Puerto Rico is under United States sovereignty, U.S. federal law applies in the territory, and cases of a federal nature are heard in the United States District Court for the District of Puerto Rico.

== See also ==
- Constitution of the Commonwealth of Puerto Rico
- Gag Law (Puerto Rico)
- Puerto Rico Tax and Customs Laws
- Puerto Rican citizenship and nationality
