= Alcides Figueroa Bilingual School =

Magnet secondary school in Añasco, Puerto Rico

- Escuela Especializada Bilingüe Alcides Figueroa
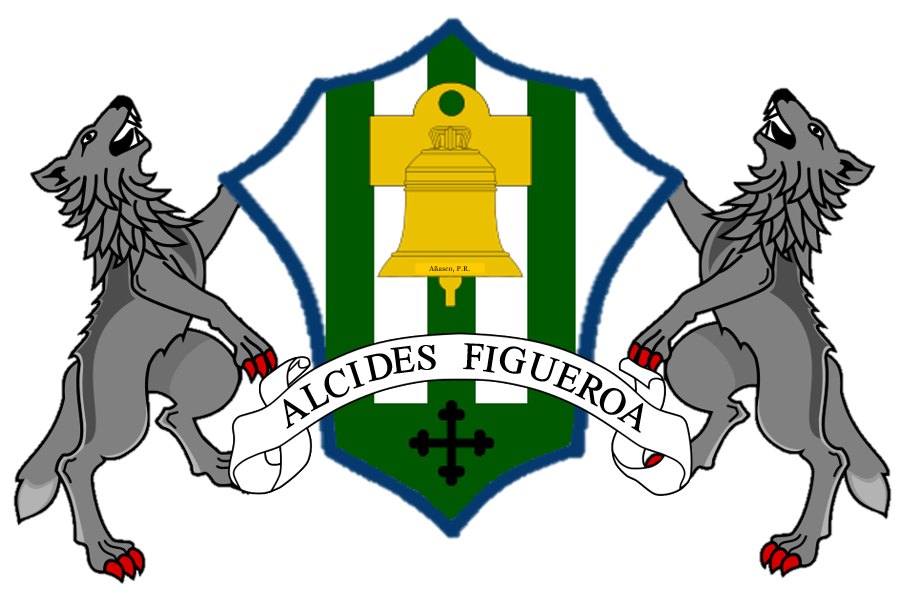

Location
- Calle María Monagas; Carreras, Añasco, 00610; Puerto Rico; 18.282304°N 67.137946°W

Information
- Former name: Escuela Especializada Regional Bilingüe Sergio Ramírez de Arrellano-Hostos
- Type: Bilingual, magnet secondary school
- Motto: La Bilingüe lo hace mejor (English: "The Bilingual does it better")
- Established: August 1999; 27 years ago
- Status: Currently operational
- School district: Puerto Rico Department of Education
- NCES District ID: 7200030
- School number: 40519 (Puerto Rico Department of Education Number) (formerly 40832)
- School code: 1602 (Use is limited to the PAA college-entry exams in Puerto Rico) (formerly 1061)
- CEEB code: 540010 (formerly 545008)
- NCES School ID: 720003000781
- Principal: Edna S. Rosa Ayala
- Faculty: 23
- Grades: 6 – 12
- Gender: Coeducational
- Enrollment: 348 (2019–2020)
  - Grade 6: 47
  - Grade 7: 55
  - Grade 8: 70
  - Grade 9: 47
  - Grade 10: 43
  - Grade 11: 37
  - Grade 12: 41
- Average class size: 25 students
- Student to teacher ratio: 15.13 : 1
- Education system: K–12 System
- Language: English and Spanish
- Schedule type: Traditional Scheduling
- Schedule: 7:30 a.m – 2:30 p.m.
- Hours in school day: Seven hours
- Campus size: 45.48 km^{2} (11.24 acres)
- Campus type: Urban
- Mascot: Wolf
- Nickname: La Bilingüe; Alcides
- Rivals: CROEM; Luis Muñoz Marín High School (Añasco)
- Accreditation: Puerto Rico Education Council
- Feeder schools: Antonio Gonzalez Suarez Regional Bilingual Elementary School
- Feeder to: University of Puerto Rico at Mayagüez
- Website: Official page

The Alcides Figueroa Bilingual School (formerly Sergio Ramírez de Arellano-Hostos Regional Bilingual Secondary School) is a bilingual, magnet secondary school located in Añasco, Puerto Rico. Alcides is run by the Puerto Rico Department of Education and falls under its Specialized Schools Unit (UnEE, for its initials in Spanish).

All classes, with the exception of non-English language courses (such as French, Italian and Spanish) and social studies, are instructed in English. The total student population sums to be approximately 348. It was the first public secondary bilingual school on the island, and, with the Antonio González Suárez Bilingual School (K–5), is part of the only fully bilingual K–12 system of a municipality of Puerto Rico. It constantly ranks at or near the top on College Board-administered standardized tests in Puerto Rico.

== History ==
The school was founded in 1999 under the name of the buildings it occupied in Añasco's Hostos–Ramírez de Arellano School District, behind the downtown church and close to City Hall. This complex of buildings was named after Sergio Ramírez de Arrellano y Conti (1829–1904), (Note: In this Spanish name, the first or paternal surname is Ramírez de Arellano and the second or maternal family name is Conti.) (Note: Ramírez de Arellano is a double-barrelled name, and therefore not both a maternal and paternal last name. The lack of Conti may be due to a misunderstanding.) a local teacher who established Añasco's first private school, and Eugenio María de Hostos, which were built in 1909 and 1903, respectively, becoming the first concrete schools built in Añasco. Both had been elementary schools since their inception, and at one point also held the local post office. The school buildings complex was added to the Puerto Rico Register of Historic Sites and Zones in 2002. In 2003, the Hostos building, which was the rectangular structure to the north of the complex, had its 100th anniversary. The event was celebrated schoolwide, with broadcasts from the local media. For its part, Ramírez de Arellano Building, which has the shape of a "C" and sits at the southern opposite of the Hostos building, held its centennial in 2009. Both structures had been recognized for their architectural importance in 2000 by the Legislative Assembly. In these facilities, as well as an annex, built in 1927 and hosting various classrooms located across the 65th Infantry street that leads into the town square, the school was divided between intermediate and superior levels, consisting of Grades 7–9 and 11–12, respectively. Both levels had five class groups, in alternate numbers (e.g. Grades 7 and 9 had two groups and Grade 8 had one) which would change as each class moved ahead between academic years. Each group was composed of a maximum of 25 students. In 2017, the buildings were added to the National Register of Historic Places.

=== Scheduling controversy ===
Then-governor Aníbal Acevedo Vilá signed four circular letters on 22 February 2007, focused on reorganizing aspects such as "school organization, teacher recruitment, student graduation requirements students, and parental involvement in the school." The Puerto Rico Teachers Federation opposed the circulars, which "[added] research courses as well as 40 hours of community service for students [and credits increased] at the elementary level to 36 and those at the intermediate level and above to 21." Additionally, they eliminated a maximum class size, stated that no class size can be below twenty, and teachers would only have an hour a day for personal training.

The new curriculum was implemented at the start of the 2007 Fall semester. However, it was met with opposition since it meant more class hours, which due to the limited size of the school and the lack of teachers, was considered impossible to implement. However, the department through the then-Mayagüez School District Superintendent, Sylvia Hernández, had ordered the school to use it. Students, parents and faculty decided to strike, and the school was joined by the Marcelino Canino school in Dorado and the Muñoz Rivera high school in Utuado, the latter of which decided to keep the old curriculum, resulting in the faculty's suspension. Following a strike by the students, parents and faculty, and meetings with Hernández, the schedule was annulled and resumed the previous curriculum and class schedule.

=== 2013 student exodus ===
At the start of the Fall 2013 semester, most of the students in various grades were dropping out from the school because, among other things, the lack of transportation (most students are from the surrounding municipalities like Mayagüez, Aguada, Rincón and Moca). Therefore, the school was obligated to do a special admissions process, letting anyone that wanted to enroll do so, or staff cuts would have been made. All that was needed for admission was a student's credit transcript and passing an oral interview in both English and Spanish, with the respective courses teachers from the school.

In addition, the school reported in 2013 several infrastructure problems, including, but not limited to, leakage, broken zinc roofs, mold, small office size for administrative personnel, and termites, among others.

=== Move to Alcides Figueroa ===
Starting in the 2016–17 academic year, the school moved to a newly displaced building a few blocks away from the old one. This move permitted it to accommodate the sixth grade, as well as increase their limited student body of 250. Additionally, this move caused a name change, since schools take their names from the buildings they occupy. This complex of buildings, which has held a school since at least 1966, takes its name from Alcides Figueroa Oliva (1892–1957), a former mayor of Añasco from 1945 till his death (who additionally served as a delegate to Puerto Rico's Constitutional Convention), and it is located on a street named after his wife. The previous tenants, who were one of 19 closed public schools which closed that year due to small grade sizes, and its students moved to the adjacent next-door school, Isabel Suárez Middle School. The abandoned Sergio Ramírez de Arrellano complex was approved for leasing and the new tenants are municipal sports and fine arts programs that relocated and expanded there. One of these is Ciudad Museo ("Museum City"), founded by Gabriela Ríos Rodríguez in 2015 in the school and "dedicated to transforming communities through urban art," one of its project being the former-school complex. It is still used as a polling place.

On 20 March 2017, the school made a trip to the Puerto Rico Capitol to view the Senate's proceedings, and were recognized by then-Vicepresident Larry Seilhamer Rodríguez and Senator Carmelo Ríos Santiago.

In 2018, one of the fourteen Puerto Rican teachers selected to partake of the Pilar Barbosa Education Program, was from Alcides. Commencing on 12 August 2019, the schedule was changed from 7:30 a.m. till 2:30 p.m.

=== Changes in the uniform ===
During 2018–2019 school year the school decided to change the school uniform they handed out ballots to students to choose the new uniform. The old uniform for middle school was yellow polo with black pants and the high school uniform was a white polo and red pants. The new uniforms, as of 1 May 2020, are a navy blue uniform and grey pants, for middle school, while high schoolers will be required to wear a red polo and grey pants.

=== Hurricane Maria, earthquakes and COVID-19 ===
Due to Hurricane Maria, Alcides suffered water damage in the director's office and several classroom, mold, broken cistern (which supplied water to the cafeteria) and downed power lines. It eventually re-opened on November 6. During Fall 2019, Alcides students began a "poetry curriculum focused on their experiences during and after Hurricane Maria," as part of the Massachusetts Music and Poetry Synchronized (MAPS) initiative, which was then given to music students at the Pioneer Valley Performing Arts Charter Public School (PVPA) by the end of the semester. This was to be followed by a visit from 15 PVPA students to Alicdes for a collaboration with the latter's students. However, the trip was cancelled by the PVPA due to the 2019–20 Puerto Rico earthquakes, which forced the indefinite closure of Alcides and inspired the PVPA students to host a charity concert at Gateway City Arts at Holyoke, Massachusetts on 13 February. During the performance, there was a video of Alcides students reading their poems.

External video
- You can view the AFS/PVPA MAPS Concert on YouTube

On 28 January, then-mayor, Jorge Estevez Martínez, claimed that not one of the public schools in Añasco had been inspected after the earthquakes. However, on 13 January, the school had been inspected by a professional engineer, who stated that the school was "suitable for immediate operation and occupancy." Alcides eventually re-opened on 3 February, with classes resuming that following Thursday, 6 February.

In mid-February, ten Alcides professors received workshops on digital teaching platforms held at the University of Puerto Rico at Mayagüez, Pontifical Catholic University of Puerto Rico at Mayagüez, and Interamerican University of Puerto Rico at Aguadilla. Alcides' chemistry teacher, Migda Ruiz López, collaborated in developing the high school chemistry module that was used during the COVID-19 pandemic. However, Alcides, as most public high schools, administered the Puerto Rico college admissions exams (PAA, for its initials in Spanish) in-person between 1–4 December. During February 2021, it was one of 172 public schools identified as "suitable to open" that formed part of an initial phase proposed by the department to resume in-person teaching starting in March. Nevertheless, this plan was abandoned, and in-person classes did not occur until 13 May.

== School community ==
=== Accreditation ===
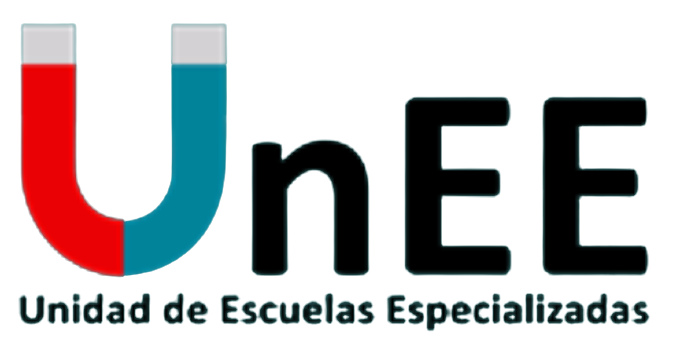
The Specialized Schools Unit's logo, the Department of Education's magnet school division.

Accreditation is obtained from the Puerto Rico Education Council for six years. However, in 2014, still bearing the name Sergio Ramírez de Arrellano, it was approved, but not accredited, by the council.

Alcides is part of the Puerto Rico Department of Education's Specialized Schools Unit (UnEE, for its initials in Spanish), which at times has been under the Assistant Secretary for Academic Services, Educational Transformation Projects, Curriculum and Pedagogical Innovation Division, and the Undersecretariat for Academic and Program Affairs.

=== Admissions ===
Due to the academic nature of the school, prospective students must apply and pass a standardized test to be considered. The admissions process is available to students from across Puerto Rico and is open for all grades, from 6th to 12th. The school holds open houses between December and January, which are followed by the would-be applicants submitting the admissions application package between January and February, which includes a credit transcript and an application to take the PIENSE test. (Note: Spanish for "THINK", its initials stand for Pruebas de Ingreso y Evaluación para el Nivel Secundario ("Entrance and Assessment Tests for the Secondary Level").) Offered by the College Board, the PIENSE test has two versions, PIENSE I is for admittance into grades 6–8, while PIENSE II is for grades 9–12, both of which evaluate students on their English, Spanish and mathematical knowledge. On a later date, applicants are interviewed individually by both the Spanish and English teachers from their respective levels. While the interview is mostly reading and oral, it might be accompanied by a written component as well. Afterwards, an admissions committee reviews the submitted materials, with the results from both the written and oral tests, and submits the list of approved applicants to the director in order of highest graded results from 100% to 70%. However, even obtaining the highest score does not guarantee admission, as these are subject to available spaces in each grade.

Students that applied for the middle school portion of the school, were admitted and graduated must reapply for the high school portion, and are subject to the high school level corresponding admissions process. Current students have preferred status during the admissions process.

=== Superlatives ===
The school body is composed from students across the entire western region of Puerto Rico, not just from Añasco. Students from this school do generally well, and known for typically being the only school in Añasco to pass the Puerto Rican Tests of Academic Achievement (then PPAA, now known as META-PR) administered annually by the Department of Education. In numerous cases, students are admitted into schools like the Residential Center for Educative Opportunities of Mayagüez as well.

In the 2009–2010 school year, it was the "public high school [in Puerto Rico] with the highest proportion of gifted students in the Advanced Placement Program." It was the top third public school with the "highest average sum of College Board-administered test scores during the 2014–2015 school year." In 2016, then-first couple Alejandro García Padilla and Wilma Pastrana, accompanied with then-Secretary of Education, Rafael Román Meléndez, recognized the school for having "the highest percentage of students with Academic Excellence [4.0 GPA through then-three years of high school]," with 41% of enrolled seniors.

In 2017, the school was home to three of the top 30 scores in the College Board University admissions test island-wide, for which each student received the Rafael Carrión Jr. Academic Excellence Award. The next year, out of the top ten highest results, two were from Alcides. The school was also the highest performing school in the META-PR standardized tests in 2018.

The school participated in Eastern Illinois University's 2002 Autumnal Equinox project, measuring the shadows at noon in Añasco. In 2006, a student team from the school won first place at the "I am a future industrial entrepreneur" regional competition, organized by the Puerto Rico Manufacturers Association and hosted at the University of Puerto Rico at Mayagüez. The first prize was awarded to them for their product, Penooff, which consisted of a pen with an integrated replaceable liquid paper cap. Two years later, in 2008, as part of Earth Day Week, then-First Lady Luisa Gándara, presided over the prize awarding of Puerto Rico Environmental Quality Board's Environmental Poster Competition, of which two out of seven winners and honorific mentions came from the school.

It won the Director's Award for the NASA Puerto Rico Space Grant Consortium's "Veggies in Space" program in 2019, which they later presented with local TV personality and meteorologist Ada Monzón at the Mayagüez Mall.

For the academic year 2018–19, it was rated the top high school out of 205 in Puerto Rico. The school possesses one of Puerto Rico's lowest school desertion rates, with only 3 cases, or 0.89%, of the whole 2020–21 student body during the fall semester. As a participating school of Education Department's International Schools program, it offers classes in Italian. However, it is sometimes underfunded, as was the case when the department was handing out office equipment for library schools as part of its RESTART program in 2020, Alcides only received ten chairs, one table and one desk, however, it received three tablets and laptops.

=== Student organizations ===
The school offers a variety of different student organizations such as:

- Future NASA Scientists and Engineers Club: inaugurated in 2019, it is headed by Mrs. Carmen Pérez.
- Medicine Club: mentored by Mrs. Migda Ruiz-attached to the Hispanic Center for Excellence of the University of Puerto Rico School of Medicine.
- Library Assistants Club: inaugurated in 2019 by former school librarian Jennie L. Mendoza Carrero.
- Theater Club: inaugurated in 2022 and headed by French and Italian teacher Javier Hernandez.

=== Relationship with the University of Puerto Rico at Mayagüez ===
Due to its proximity to the University of Puerto Rico at Mayagüez (UPRM) and the large size of graduates that enroll there, 114 graduates between the 2016–2017 and 2021–2022 school years, many Alcides student participate in camps, competitions and conferences offered by the university. These include:

- Cinco Días con Nuestra Tierra-students are invited to attend the five-day agricultural fair held annually on the Rafael A. Mangual Coliseum grounds.
- CREST-summer camp and research program focused on nanotechnology, one of the Centers of Research Excellence in Science and Technology funded by the National Science Foundation.
- Mechanical Engineering Summer Camp-hosted by the Mechanical Engineering Department and "aimed at guiding high school students on this discipline and motivating them to select it as a future career."
- National Crystallization Competition-hosted by the UPRM Chemistry Department's Science on Wheels program and by the UPRRP's Creando ConCiencia ("Creating ConScience"), "students worked for eight weeks on developing the crystals and explained the method they used to grow the crystals to a jury."
- PR Weather Camp-coordinated by the Marine Sciences Department and sponsored by the National Oceanic and Atmospheric Administration, exposes high school students to the meteorological and environmental sciences.
- Sea Grant Program-marine ecosystems and sand composition workshops, followed by a field trip to Rosada beach, in La Parguera the next day, with "several activities related to mangrove forests, seagrasses, meteorology, water quality and invertebrates."
- Summer Transportation Institute-hosted by the College of Engineering, it seeks to offer high school, specifically those who have completed tenth grade, students a wider panorama of future careers in sciences, mathematics and engineering in the transportarion industry through multiple activities, such as building model bridges, in and around the campus, and travelling to the field, such as to San Juan, and culminates in the students presenting their research.
- UPR Summer School-for students in grades 10–12 who "received classes focused on the subjects of Mathematics and English in the mornings [while in] the afternoons, they attended various workshops, as well as social and sports activities."

=== School grounds ===
School logo used at entrance of the school campus

School facilities include:

- Athletic track
- Basketball court
- Small central plaza with basketball hoop
- Cafeteria
- Library

The upkeep of the school grounds is the responsibility of the Office for the Management of Public Buildings (OMEP, for its initials in Spanish). Additionally, it serves as the polling place for Añasco's 13th election unit, and is considered to be a "critical facility" that the Puerto Rico Aqueducts and Sewers Authority must provide water to. A 2019 natural hazards mitigation plan, found the school had a "high" risk of suffering soil liquefaction but a "low" chance of suffering landslides and a "0%" chance of flooding recurrence. Nonetheless, when the United States Geological Survey studied floods in the Añasco area in 1971, it found that Alcides had been flooded significantly three times, these been on 12 August 1956, with 9.6 m (31 feet) above mean sea level with a recurrence of approximately fourteen years, on 20 August 1960, with 8.7 m (29 feet) above mean sea level with a recurrence of six years, and on 23 July 1966, with 8 m (26 feet) above mean sea level with a recurrence of less than four years. In 2019, it was reported that:

[E]very time it rains, the water runs from the roof into the hallways of the campus, where students must pass through during the class changes. The problem is such that the campus patio floods in a few minutes with only hundredths of an inch of rain falling, raising the water level to the step entrances of some classrooms, which obviously prevents students from entering the room without getting wet up to their ankles.

— Daileen Joan Rodríguez, La Isla Oeste

=== School personnel ===
==== List of principals ====
| Principals | From | To |
|---|---|---|
| Aixa M. Alers Martínez | 2000 | July 2019 |
| Edna S. Rosa Ayala | August 2019 | Incumbent |

==== Notable faculty ====
- Ramón Morales Rivera- Middle and High school Spanish teacher and Head teacher.
- Roberto L. Díaz Díaz-High school Math teacher, co-winner of Operación Éxito's ("Operation Success") 2011 summer camp, has contributed to the department's mathematical operational guides and is the first Añasco municipal legislator from Movimiento Victoria Ciudadana.

=== Enrollment ===
==== At Sergio Ramírez de Arellano ====
- 2013―14
- 2014―15
- 2015―16

Source: (Note: Final three school years.)

==== At Alcides ====
- 2018―19
- 2019―20

== Graduating classes ==
| Year (Note: Refers to the end of the school year, when seniors graduate in May.) | Freshmen | Seniors |
|---|---|---|
| 2012 | Yerenaix | Armageddon |
| 2013 | Epsilion | |
| 2014 | Oneirux | Phoenix |
| 2015 (Note: This was the last in which the middle school graduation occurred in ninth grade. Through a Department reorganization, following graduations would be upon completion of eighth grade as middle school now commenced in sixth and high school at ninth grade.) | Dragons | Jetzodiam |
| 2016 | Zyderix | Eminence |
| 2017 | | Olympus |
| 2018 | | Azairus |
| 2019 | Epsiliom (or Epsilon) | Imperium |
| 2020 | Giorenix | Legacy |
| 2021 | Atypical | Cronos Altiorem |
| 2022 | Azairus | Athena |
| 2023 | Syderix | Hyori |
| 2024 | Zoidaem | Kenoxis |
| 2025 | | Pandora |

== Notable alumni ==
- Shaina Isaray Cabán Cortés (Class of '15, High School)-journalist and co-host of Jay Fonseca's Jay y Sus Rayos X.
- Natalia Chaparro Resto (Class of '14, Middle School)-creator and founder of Raitrú.
- Laura Ysabel Cruz Arroyo (Class of '18, High School)-singer in La Voz Kids (Season 3).
- Geobriel Febus (Class of '17, High School)-finalist of La Máxima ("The Maximum"), a competition held by the New Virtual School.
- Gabriela Ríos Rodríguez (Class of '17, High School)-founder and director of Ciudad Museo ("Museum City").
- Zoryan Rodríguez Feliciano (Class of '14, High School)-winner of the sixth edition of Poetry Out Loud in Puerto Rico.
- Julián Rodríguez Jirau (Class of '13, High School)-University College London Bio-Integrated Design Masters student.
