= PPAA =

PPAA may refer to:

- PPA Tour Australia, a pro pickleball tour
- Propanephosphonic acid anhydride
- Pruebas Puertorriqueñas de Aprovechamiento Académico, Puerto Rican Tests of Academic Achievement
