= Education in Puerto Rico =

Department of Education Council on Higher Education

National education budget
- Budget: $3.5 billion US$

General details
- Primary languages: Spanish, English
- System type: state, private

Literacy
- Male: 96.9%
- Female: 90.3

Enrollment
- Total: unknown
- Primary: 278,884
- Secondary: 309,420
- Post secondary: 283,550

Attainment
- Secondary diploma: 60%
- Post-secondary diploma: 18.3%

Education in Puerto Rico is overseen by the Department of Education of Puerto Rico and the Puerto Rico Education Council. The Department oversees all elementary and secondary public education while the Council oversees all academic standards and issues licenses to educational institutions wishing to operate or establish themselves in Puerto Rico.

Instruction in Puerto Rico is compulsory between the ages of five and 18, which comprises the elementary and high school grades. Students may attend either public or private schools. As of 2013, the island had 1,460 public schools and 764 private schools; there were 606,515 K–12 students, 64,335 vocational students, and 250,011 university students. In 2021, the average public school size was 355 students. Because of damage caused by Hurricane Maria in 2017, a shrinking population, deteriorating infrastructure, and the Puerto Rican government-debt crisis, 283 schools were closed in Puerto Rico by 2018.

The literacy rate of the Puerto Rican population is 93%; when divided by gender, this is distributed as 92.8% for males and 93.8% for females. According to the 2000 Census, 60.0% of the population attained a high school degree or higher level of education, and 18.3% has a bachelor's degree or higher.

== History ==
=== Early institutions ===
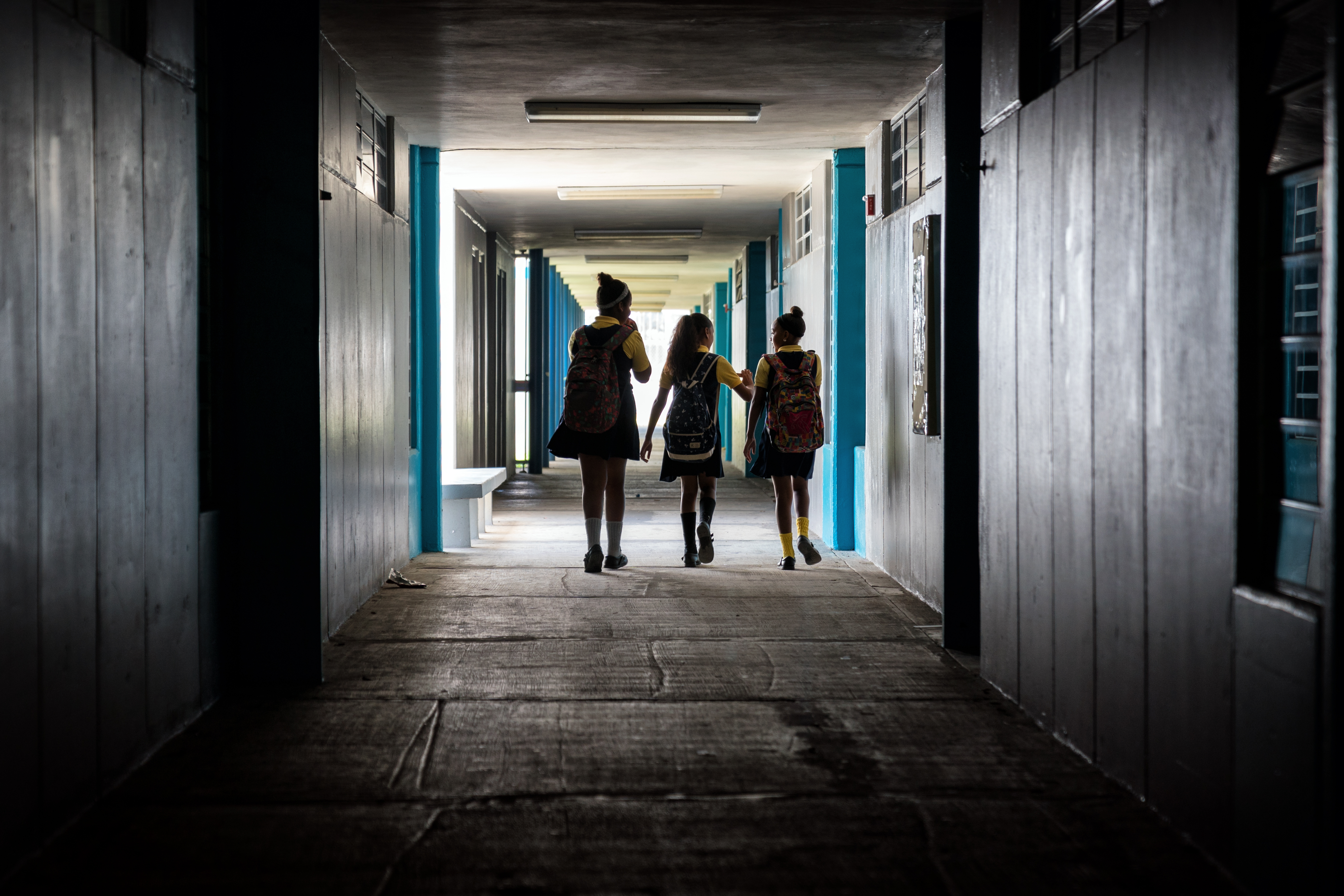
Students at Belen Blanco De Zequeira in Loíza, Puerto Rico

By 1509, Juan Ponce de León had requested aid in the diffusion of basic education from the General Governor of the Indies. It is unknown, but likely, that this led to the first school in Puerto Rico. The first school in Puerto Rico was the Escuela de Gramática (English: Grammar School). The school was established by Bishop Alonso Manso in 1513, in the area where the Cathedral of San Juan was to be constructed. The school was free of charge and the courses taught were art, history, Latin language, literature, philosophy, science and theology.

Education would be tied to the Catholic Church from the beginning, as an ecclesiastical license was required to teach. Pious men educated in these schools would be assigned to occupy several offices throughout the Spanish empire. Colonial governors named by the Spanish crown consistently adopted Eurocentric stances that led to a number of political clashes, frequently resulting in the denial of educational proposals, the closing of institutions and the intervention with teachers (which were interfered with, stripped of certification or even exiled). Ultimately, the role of the teachers was persistently monitored by the authorities, who were concerned with the benefit of the curriculum to the stances of the metropole. In 1582, a donation by Antón Lucas allowed for the organization of a grammatical school at Sanct Alfonso Hospital. Another was established at the San Juan Cathedral seven years later with the patronage of Francisco Ruiz. In 1643, Jorge Cambero created a grammatical school at the Santo Domingo Convent at San Juan.

The concept of public school wasn't used on the island until 1739, and even then it operated with loose connection to the government. The first attempt to create a local university dates back to 1750, when physician Nicolás Ruiz lobbied in favor. Fellow doctors Miguel de Mena and Francisco Manuel de Acosta attempted to establish the Universidad de Nuestra Señora de Belén at Santo Tomás Convent in 1770. This coincided with arrangements made by governor Miguel de Muesas to create one at Santo Domingo Convent. In 1788, Iñigo Abad y Lasierra noted his perception that more schools were needed. That year, a school of philosophy was established at the Santo Domingo Convent. In 1795, an unsuccessful attempt was made to move the Universidad de la Española to San Juan following the signing of the Paz de Basilea. Additional petitions in 1797 and 1801 met the same fate.

=== Higher education and official system ===
During the first half of the 19th Century, schools (both primary and secondary) founded by a number of individuals, including Carlos Martínez, Valeriano Sanmillán, Antonio Chiesa, Carlos Milano, Ramón de Carpegna, José María de Bobadilla, Juan Prudencio Monclova, Fulgencio Angla, Pedro García, Francisco Boneta and Julián Blanco, along a number of lyceums and other institutions. This also marked the debut of girls schools, beginning as early as 1802 with the one founded by Celestino Cordero. During the second half, institutions like the Colegio de San Juan and the Escuela Superior followed suit. Figures like Román Baldorioty de Castro also led private institutions. In 1809, the governor ordered the municipality of San Juan to take over public education. This marked a move towards a state regulated system.

Most of the students within the public system were divided by a dichotomy composed by the children of wealthy citizens (whose parents could afford education) and those that received aid from the regional governments. It wasn't until January 29, 1812, that black children were allowed by the Spanish authorities to attend, but segregation and state sposored discrimination were widespread. In other matters there was some progress, such as Salvador Meléndez Bruna bringing teaching material from Spain (including Catón Cristiano and Catecismo de la Doctrina Cristiana) and having it reprinted and distributed. The Governor also expressed his official opposition to physical punishment in schools in a piece dated August 17, 1813. The adoption of the 1812 Constitution brought with it orders to build elementary schools in all towns and maintain them.

On May 10, 1821, Aróstegui Herrera requested reports on the status of education to the mayors. He also approached the Sociedad Económica de Amigos del País about creating a school based on the monitorial system developed by Joseph Lancaster. The concept reached Puerto Rico within the year, when institutions opened under his philosophy at San Juan. Another would be inaugurated at Caguas in 1839. However, Ramón de Carpagna would later introduce the Wood philosophy to Landcastarian schools as well. The Asociación de Maestros de la Provincia was established, sponsoring the building of a warship named La Ilustración on behalf of the teachers. The teaching of foreign languages including Latin, English, German and French, were widespread throughout the 19th Century with initiatives of the church, schools and individuals. In 1823, experimental physics began being taught at the San Francisco Convent.

On March 4, 1823, the Cortes Nacionales authorized the establishment of a university in Puerto Rico. However, the French invasion and the Second Restoration prevented the materialization. The approval of a new constitution prompted Governor Juan Vasco y Pasqual to include the understanding of the document in the curriculum. The following year another approach was made to the king, meeting the same fate as its predecessors. In 1834, another proposals to create a university was drafted, but ultimately abandoned when the Estamento was dissolved. In 1838, the municipality of Guayama approached the governor about establishing a university at San Juan with an emphasis in medicine, jurisprudence and theology, which received the support of the Sociedad Económica de Amigos del País and the Comisión Permanente de Instrucción Pública (both of which proposed additions to the proposed curriculum). Ultimately, despite being forwarded by the Junta Ordinaria de la Sociedad and the governor, the proposal was ignored.

Religious figures as well as authors such as Torcuato Tomo de la Riva, Ernesto Ollero, Juan Prudencio Monclova and, Ramón Martínez Gandía and José Ferrer de Cuoto, among others were responsible for the books studied throughout the island. Competitions in matters such as calligraphy and school festivities such as the Fiesta del Árbol were introduced. By this point, the requirements to be a teacher remained based on the royal provisions from the 18th Century in which candidates were subjected to numerous evaluations by political, religious and certified teachers, as well as profess the Catholic faith and be of "pure blood", with the municipal government leading the process that concluded with the approval of the governor. On December 20, 1838, municipal commissions were given power in the process. The process to fill vacancies or name substitute teachers also involved the government.

On May 12, 1839, black children were allowed in the same institutions as white children, tough separately. Following a racial clash involving teacher Francisco Boneta, governor Miguel López de Baños suggested reimposing segregation in schools. The municipal government considered this troublesome, threading lightly on the topic. On February 4, 1846, the Comisión Superior de Instrucción issued a disposition establishing a race line at schools. In some cases, such as a School at Mayagüez, the separation of students was not enough to prevent wealthy white parents from withdrawing their children from the institutions once black children enrolled. This, in turn, affected the income of the teachers. Multiple initiatives implemented during the following decade responded to ongoing class and racial struggles, with lines emerging between the average local population and the Peninsular and wealthier residents. Awards, were used to promote attendance and such as the First Class Award (established in 1841) given to the best student in Puerto Rico and the Second Class Award given to the next eight. Other recognitions were also given to emphasize matters like hygiene.

The Catholic Church continued its involvement with local education, with Bishop Pedro Gutiérrez del Arroyo beginning the efforts to build the Seminario Conciliar. The institution officially opened on July 2, 1832, with emphasis on religious education and theology, but also featuring scientific education that included mathematics, as well as philosophy and language. The inaugural enrollment was of 33 students, all of which were submitted to a number of religious and health evaluations, a number that increased systematically afterwards and included a dozen poor students. Among its graduates were José Julián Acosta and Julián Blanco Sosa. The Seminario passed to the Society of Jesus at the request of governor José de Lemery. Afterwards, the Jesuits renamed the institution to Seminario-Colegio. In 1848, a school for the deaf was established at San Juan.

Specialized schools emerged during the mid-Century. Rufo Manuel Fernández involved in a series of initiatives on chemistry and physics. On June 27, 1844, he led an initiative to create a university with the support of the Sociedad Económica de Amigos del País, which also lobbied to create a college specializing on medicine. After money was collected throughout Puerto Rico, the group approached governor Juan de la Pezuela, who objected and forced the devolution of the money. Other practices such as drawing, mathematics, law, commerce, geography, chemistry, were sponsored by the Sociedad Económica de Amigos del País, operating along similar initiatives established by the crown, government, municipalities and individuals. In 1848, a Music Academy was created under Carlos Allard. Other initiatives included courses offered by the Casino de Artesanos de San Juan. On November 18, 1854, a school focusing on agricultural, commercial and nautical topics was established at San Juan. Military education saw emphasis in 1860 and 1876, with the establishment of the Escuela Militar and Academia de Ciencias y Preparatoria para Carreras Especiales respectively.

The Junta Superior Provincial de Instrucción Pública established by Miguel de la Torre in 1834 was replaced by the Academia Real de Buenas Letras by Pezuela in 1850. It was not until November 6, 1848, that the Comisión Superior Provincial de Instrucción Primaria received the power to evaluate teacher candidates through an exam that attended a number of topics focusing on religion, math and grammar. Governor Juan de la Pezuela created the Academia Real de las Buenas Letras in 1850, which in turn became responsible for recognizing teachers. That same year, an institute for candidates was established at Colegio de la Concepción by Manuel Sergio Cuevas Bacener. However, non-certified women were allowed to open schools for girls.

The number of poor children assigned to a single teacher at San Juan was reduced to 30. However, this change was short lived. By November 18, 1951, Governor Enrique de España and a couple of teachers attempted to reinstate the previous quota or, in defect, for the municipal government to create a new school. On August 5, 1853, the Comisión de Instrucción Primaria sponsored the introduction of the analytical system to the curriculum. On September 22, 1854, governor Fernando de Norzagaray lobbied for a project to have separate schools for black children universally created throughout Puerto Rico. On February 21, 1855, the Comisión de Instrucción Primaria expressed its support for segregation to the mayor of Loíza, even if this meant that black children would have to wait until institutions were specifically built for them. By October, the secretary of the Academia Real de Buenas Letras Martín Travieso proposed the creation of such schools at San Juan.

In December 1856, Ignacio Guasp favored the creation of black schools in all districts and took the matter to colonial governor José de Lemery, with no results. The matter was retaken years later by Governor Félix María de Messina, who requested the creation of these institutions. Criollo José Julián Acosta criticized the status of education in 1860. Despite this, the following year all graduate candidates from Colegio de a Concepción approved their degrees. On June 25, 1862, the municipality of San Juan established the age of eight as the requirement attend school. The following year, this was lowered to 7 years. On June 10, 1865, an Organic Decree lowered it to 6 years and made primary education mandatory. During the next two years, the authorities worked with both parents and mayors to meet this standard, though the working class presented notable resistance based on absence of resources. An official education system was created in 1865. At the time, attendance was compulsory until age 9. On January 4, 1866, a rule set was created for public schools, in which a weekly honor list was established and teachers were tasked with keeping track of attendance and be aware of enrolled students. Tough, information concerning the students had been submitted to municipal governments since the beginning of the century for evaluation. The simultaneous method was adopted for reading and writing. However, with the arrival of Julián Juan Pavía to the governorship, economic guarantees were no longer provided for teachers.

The Organic Decree of July 10, 1865, replaced the latter model with the Junta Superior de Instrucción de Puerto Rico, with municipalities having their own local boards. In 1872, the office of General Inspector was established to supervise schools, which only lasted two years before being revoked by the governor. During this stage there were 122 public schools and about 3,480 students. In 1869, the license for teachers changed from the "Escuela Normal" classification to another that allowed them to teach at any primary school if the regent was certified. In October of that year, Sanz allowed people with pertinent education levels to apply to become Superior Teachers without the need for an exam. However, on February 27, 1876, the Crown ordered the continuation of the tests. The following year, Adrián Martínez Gandía created a practice course for potential candidates at San Juan. Félix María de Messina pursued a reform of the system. Within ten years, the schools were noted to be relying on individuals without proper accreditation, with a curriculum that was insufficient and about 9,100 students. In 1874, efforts were made to emphasize the 1865 decree. Four years later, there were 12,144 students. A number of night schools for adults were established.

=== The Liberal and Conservative divide ===
The Instituto Civil de Segunda Enseñanza was proposed in 1873 by Nicolás Aguayo, facing immediate opposition by conservatives. Despite this, the institution opened in November of that year and included among its professors the likes of Agustín Stahl, José Julián Acosta and Pedro Gerónimo Goico. However, in 1874 governor Sanz removed them with the justification that the students were not being taught loyalty to Spain. Francisco S. Alfonzo and Román Baldorioty de Castro made separate proposals to establish institutions with features often attributed to universities. In 1879, the liberal provincial representatives approved a proposal to establish a university, facing opposition from the Partido Conservador which lobbied to have it ignored with support at the Cortes Nacionales. Another proposal was made before the end of the year, this time being disregarded in a Royal Decree.

An organic degree from September 12, 1880, created the Junta Provincial de Instrucción Pública. The teaching of geography was also added to the curriculum. On May 10, 1881, Eulogio Despujol suggested the establishment of free schools to the municipalities, elaborating on an Organic Decree issues the previous year. This faced the opposition of José Gaudier Font. By the end of the Despujol administration, there were 541 schools. In the process it had assigned the same responsibilities to private school teachers as their counterparts in the public system and allowed municipalities to raise the salary of teachers.

A vocational school, the Escuela Professional was inaugurated on November 28, 1883, instructing a number of careers. Three years later, the Escuela General Preparatoria de Ingenieros y Arquitectos was established with similar functions. On July 20, 1886, the National Courts assigned 1,000 for educational purposes in Mayagüez and Ponce along 2,000 for the escuelas particulares. Four years later, 4,000 additional pesos were assigned for the latter.

In 1885, Gabriel Ferrer Hernández lobbied in favor of creating a university, proposing that if the government refused again, then initiatives to send the students to Havana should be approved instead. A project supporting the latter was presented by José María de Caracens on April 5, 1887. The Partido Conservador succeeded in having it retired from consideration. Manuel Fernández Juncos, Gabriel Ferrer Hernández and Juan Hernández López pushed it again, but settled in an agreement to lobby in favor of establishing a local university. In 1888, Manuel Rossy Calderón tried to have a university established at the Ateneo Puertorriqueño in an attempt to fulfill the parameters of the Ley Sobre Enseñanza Privada, which led to a proposal completed with the collaboration of Manuel de Elzaburu Vizcarrondo. Parallel to this, more especialized programs continued being founded, like the fencing classes taught at the Liceo Militar. The Instituto de Música created at San Juan focused on artistic education.

The Institución de Enseñanza Superior was inaugurated on October 10, 1888 and featured instruction on Philosophy and Letters, Universal History, Literature, Law, Critical History of Spain, Medicine, Mineralogy, Sciences, Botany and Zoology, and Greek. During the following years, the institution expanded its curriculum. On February 9, 1891, the Instituto Provincial de Segunda Enseñanza was opened at San Juan. In 1893, the Peninsular courts assigned 7,000 pesos to fund secondary education. Public Education was organized into 500 centers by 1897 and within a year the Consejo Insular de Instrucción Pública replaced the previous format.

=== American administration ===
The Foraker act of 1900 established the commissioner of education in Puerto Rico and created the department of public education. The commissioner of education was appointed by William McKinley, President of the United States. The first commissioner 1900 – 1902 was Martin Grove Brumbaugh, who was the first professor pedagogy at the University of Pennsylvania, and was president of Juniata College. He reorganized the public school system, encourage both pupils and teachers to become bilingual in Spanish and English, and built a normal school for training teachers. Brumbaugh's education policies promoted Americanization, which followed the policies of Puerto Rico's two political parties, which both were committed to turning Puerto Rico into an American state. Samuel McCune Lindsay, appointed by the Theodore Roosevelt, President of the United States served as Education Commissioner 1902 – 1904 continued the policy preparing Puerto Rico for American statehood. Laws passed in 1899 required education in Puerto Rico to consist of a public system for ages six to eighteen, to limit the student/teacher ratio to 50:1, and to be coed. The 1900 Department of Public Instruction became the Department of Education in 1989.

Julian Go argues that the primary goals of American policy were:

Under American control, Puerto Ricans and Filipinos would vote in free elections, take up office, help devise legislation, and administer the colony's daily affairs-first in local (municipal) governments and later in national legislative assemblies. The native officials would be given more and more autonomy as they moved through this system, slowly learning their so-called "object lessons" in American-styled governance. Local governments would be granted more duties and functions, the legislative assemblies would be allowed to devise laws "with less and less assistance," and in general American control would be slowly loosened. The underlying principle of political education was thus: "Free self-government in ever-increasing measure."

According to Go, in actual practice there was less and less local autonomy and more and more centralized control of education. The problem was that rich local elites based in the Federal Party had taken local control, and were not prepared to introduce local democracy against their personal interests. Go argues that the local elites were corrupt and used the system for their own personal benefit, including pocketing a slice of the local government budget.

The commissioner of education led efforts to introduce American culture in preparation for a democratic society that would be admitted as an equal state to the union. English-language instruction was dominant until 1939, when Spanish was made the official language of instruction. English is currently taught as a second language beginning from first grade and continuing straight through senior year of high school.

Following American principles of separation of church and state, public school education became independent of religious instruction. The teaching of US history, replacing Puerto Rican historical figures with American ones, reciting the Pledge of Allegiance, and the celebrating American holidays were means to Americanize students on the island. Americanization was meant to uplift the locals. The United States founded schools and trained both US and Puerto Rican teachers in education. Puerto Rican teachers were sent to the United States to receive training. In the island, US teachers would train Puerto Rican teachers. By 1913, the US government had invested 14 million dollars on public education in the island and 1,050 schools had been built in rural areas.

Protestants from the mainland arrived to build a non-Catholic educational infrastructure. Presbyterians were highly active and founded many primary and secondary schools. Presbyterian missionaries all spoke Spanish and were committed to supporting the local Hispanic cultural heritage.

Despite the dominance of Protestant and secular public education, Catholic schools also expanded during the early twentieth century. During the colonial era, there had been only three Catholic schools, but by 1917, there were twenty-seven. Another twenty-five had been founded by 1940.

=== Trade unions and reform ===
The adoption of Law 134 of 1960 and Law 139 of 1961 allowed numerous employees of all government agencies to organize and collectively negotiate. However, it was Law 45 of 1998 which allowed teachers and other central government employees the right to properly syndicate. In Puerto Rico, the main education unions are the Puerto Rico Teachers Association (AMPR), the Teachers' Federation of Puerto Rico (FMPR) and Educadores Puertorriqueños en Acción (EPA). The AMPR was created in 1908 as the Asociación Puertorriqueña de Maestros, being joined by the Asociación Insular del Magisterio a year later. In 1966, teachers from Escuela Vocacional Miguel Such created the FMPR as direct competition to the AMPR, eventually outnumbering it and affiliating with the AFT. Educadores Puertorriqueños en Acción (EPA) was created in 1977, as a platform to promote the continuity of gratuitous public education.

By 1980, a study conducted by the Interamerican University revealed that the public only gave a "C" grade to the education system. In 1988, a project known as Hacia el Logro de una Escuela Puertorriqueña más Efectiva was drafted, identifying a number of areas to work with including curriculum, evaluation, availability of personnel and incentives, among others. Proposals for education reform led to Law No. 68 of 1990 (or Ley Orgánica del Departamento de Educación), which attempted to improve the system. Law 18 of 1993 (or Ley para el Desarollo de las Escuelas de la Comunidad) and its amended version Law 48 of 1994, created the "Community School" and included autonomy on a variety of areas and promoted inter-sectorial participation. In September 1993, EPA proposed a protest against Law 18 (or Ley para el desarrollo de las Escuelas de la Comunidad) with the support of the Department of Work & Human Resources and the Health Department, believing that it represented a risk against the permanency of education employees. The strike materialized on November 3, after the organizations felt that the government was unwilling to negotiate. Ultimately, the project was amended and an evaluation period of 18 months enacted for the "Community Schools" that it proposed.

By the 2000s, the failure of Laws 18, 48 and 149 was considered evident by the teachers. In 1994, the CGE gauged the perception that the teachers had of the public system, of which 46% qualified it as "regular" and 40.5% "excellent" or "good". Two years later, the Department of Education queried secondary level educators on a number of matters, receiving an average of 2.4 (equivalent to a "C"). Law 149 of 1999 was approved as a new organic law for the Department of Education, including most of the points of its predecessors but also including the teaching of English.

== Levels ==
Since an educational reform in 2018, the public school system in Puerto Rico has been organized into the following levels:

Level in Spanish	Level in English	Grades	Ages
Primario	Elementary	Pre-kindergarten (prekínder), kindergarten, and first through eighth grades	
Secundario	Secondary	Ninth through twelfth grades	
Postsecundario	Postsecondary	Thirteenth and fourteenth grades	16+

Some Puerto Rican schools, known as segunda unidad (second unit) schools, serve kindergarten and first through ninth grades (K–9).

As of 2013, the overall educational system in Puerto Rico consists of seven categories. These categories are based on the educational levels covered:

No.	Level	Age	Commonly known as	Compulsion	Remarks
1	nursery school	0–4	pre-K	optional	comprises Early Head Start, Head Start, and pre-kindergarten
2	preschool	5	K	compulsory	comprises kindergarten
3	elementary education	6–11	1–6	compulsory	comprises first grade to sixth grade
4	junior high school	12–14	7–9	compulsory	comprises seventh grade to ninth grade
5	high school	15–17	10–12	compulsory	comprises tenth grade to twelfth grade
6	undergraduate	18+	college	optional	comprises associate and/or bachelor's degree
7	graduate	22+	graduate school	optional	comprises master's degree, doctorate, and/or post-doctorate

Some Puerto Rican schools, most notably in rural areas, offer kinder to ninth grade (K–9) at the same institution and are referred to as Segunda Unidad (English: Second Unit). Other schools offer seventh grade to twelfth grade (7–12) at the same institution and are referred to as Nivel Secundario (English: Secondary Level).

== Elementary and secondary education ==
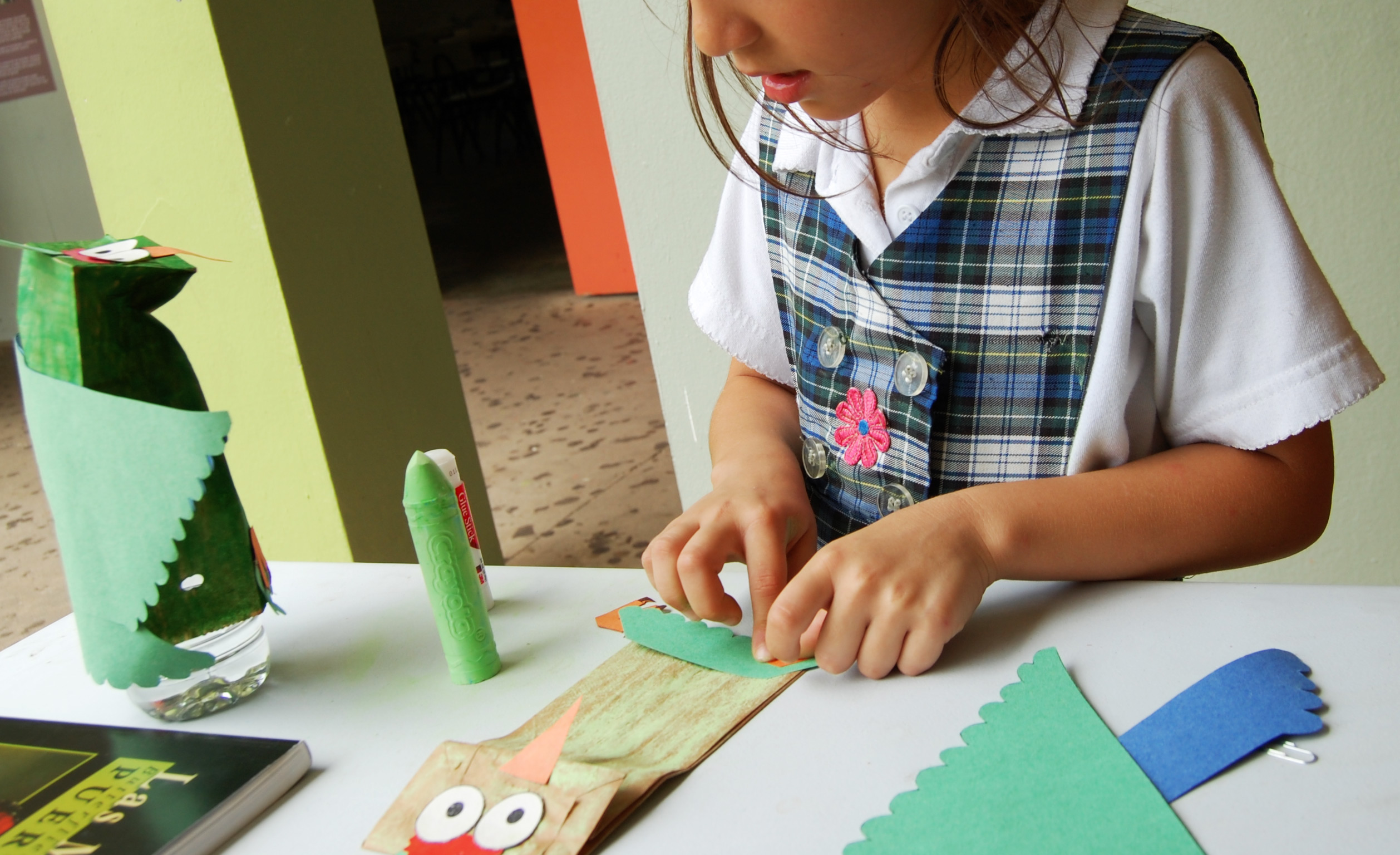
Elementary school student working on a Puerto Rican parrot activity

=== Public education ===
The Constitution of the Commonwealth of Puerto Rico grants the right to an education to every citizen on the island. To this end, public schools in Puerto Rico provide free and secular education at the elementary and secondary levels.

The public school system is funded by the commonwealth and is operated by the Puerto Rico Department of Education (Departamento de Educación del Estado Libre Asociado de Puerto Rico) Inicio. The department employs over 45 thousand teachers of which 32,000 have full-time tenureships and are organized under several independent unions, including the Puerto Rico Teachers Association and the Teachers' Federation of Puerto Rico. The remaining teachers are either temporary or contracted on a yearly basis.

Preschool education, care, and services (including Early Head Start and Head Start) are free for low income families with private daycares being common and within walking distance in urban areas. Primary and secondary education is compulsory and free regardless of income through more than 1,400 public schools. Ten public schools are considered prestigious locally. All of them being magnet schools, which graduate the highest scores on the island of the College Board's PEAU (Latin America's equivalent of the SAT). Two examples of these are CIMATEC and CROEM which focus on science, technology, and mathematics.

Public schools in Puerto Rico are subject to the federal laws of the United States. The NCLB, No Child Left Behind Act included Puerto Rico until president Obama approved a waiver on October 22, 2013.

Education Department spokeswoman Yolanda Rosaly told The Associated Press on May 5, 2017 that approximately 27,000 students will be moved, as a result of 184 public school planned closings. The economic crisis in Puerto Rico drove the decision to close the schools, which officials have said will save millions of dollars.

Governor Ricardo Rosselló proposed a radical education reform bill in February 2018. The reform bill hopes to give Puerto Rico's public school teachers the first raise in over ten years; an idea that some find skeptical. He signed the legislation in March to incorporate a charter school voucher system after more than 600 amendments were made during debate. Hurricane Maria caused an exodus of more than 25,000 students; the single centralized school district is projected to lose 54,000 students by 2021. The voucher system is going to limit private schools to 3 percent of the student population; whereas the charter schools will receive 10 percent.

In May 2025, the Puerto Rico House of Representatives approved a bill directing the Department of Education to design and integrate history courses, including U.S. history, into the general curriculum of vocational schools in Puerto Rico.

==== Language ====
Unlike most schools in the United States, public school instruction in Puerto Rico is conducted entirely in Spanish. English is taught as a second language and is a compulsory subject at all levels. In the early years following the 1898 American occupation of the island, the opposite was true: public schooling was entirely conducted in English, and Spanish was treated as a special subject as sanctioned by the US from 1903 to 1917 for grades 1 through 4; only by 1934 were grades five through eight also being taught in Spanish. Upon the appointment of Blanton Winship to be governor of Puerto Rico, English was reinstated as the educational language until 1941; again, only utilizing English in primary schools.

Luis Muñoz Marín, the first popularly elected governor in 1948 appointed Mariano Villaronga Toro, Commissioner of Education on the island, and with him, an immediate switch back to using Spanish for instruction. By the 1970s, bilingual programs were introduced to 113 of the schools in Puerto Rico. In 2012, pro-statehood Governor Luis Fortuño caused controversy when he proposed that all courses in Puerto Rico public schools be taught in English instead of Spanish as they currently are.

==== Popular culture ====
Academic disciplines such as ethnomusicology, folklore, and cultural studies have helped legitimize scholarship on vernacular culture. For example. Afro-Puerto Rican bomba has been included.

=== Private schools ===
Private schools in Puerto Rico are operated by non-governmental institutions. While accredited elementary and secondary private schools in Puerto Rico must meet minimum public education requirements for academic work, accreditation is optional. There aren't any current policies regarding nursing/health, technology, professional development, or reimbursement when performing state/local functions.

There are more than 700 private schools on the island and over 8,000 teachers, most of them Catholic. It is constitutionally illegal to deny entrance or take action against students that profess a difference faith than the school they attend or intend to attend. Students from differing denominations are legally freed from attending religious activities on the schools they attend. Prominent private schools include The Episcopal Cathedral School, Colegio Católico Notre Dame, Academia Bautista de Puerto Nuevo, Academia del Perpetuo Socorro, Academia Maria Reina, Academia San Jorge, Colegio Marista Guaynabo, Colegio San Ignacio de Loyola, Colegio San José, and American Military Academy, which maintain a high rate of students being accepted into prominent universities in the United States.

=== Homeschooling ===
Homeschooling, an alternative form of education, is legal in Puerto Rico but is neither regulated nor legislated. However, as of June 2017, Puerto Rico is the first among the US states and territories to declare homeschooling a fundamental right.

The issue of legislation has caused a serious rift within the homeschooling community. While some of these parents want the government to establish a public policy on homeschooling, others oppose all forms of legislation. They also allege that the lack of regulation has led them to confront difficulties when interacting with the government, as evidenced in the case of a home schooled student who was denied federal Social Security benefits.

From the Applicable Law portion of the decision:

Student benefits are payable if the student meets the Federal standards for full-time attendance (FTA) (RS 00205.300C.); the law of the State in which the home school is located recognizes home school as an educational institution (El); the home school the student attends meets the requirements of State law in which the home school is located; and the student meets all the other requirements for benefits.

Education is compulsory in Puerto Rico between the ages of six and seventeen years. 3L.P.R.A. §391 (a). Attendance in public elementary and secondary schools is compulsory for students except for those students attending "schools established under non-governmental auspices." - Puerto Rico Constitution, Article II §5; 18 L.P.R.A. §2.

After careful consideration of all the evidence, the undersigned Administrative Law Judge concludes the claimant did not attend a sanctioned homeschool program approved by the Puerto Rican legislature within the meaning of the Social Security Act from December 1, 2003 to August 1, 2004.

== Higher education ==
Over half of the students entering college level institutions in Puerto Rico, never graduate: 41% of four-year students in public universities and 33% in private institutions get a diploma. 8.90% of people in Puerto Rico earn an associate degree and 6.30% of people get graduate or professional degrees.

=== Community colleges and technical institutes ===
There are a number of technical school as well as community college in the town, including the Huertas College, and Mech-Tech College in Caguas, the ICPR Junior College in Hato Rey and Manati, American Educational College in Bayamón and Manati), the Instituto de Banca y Comercio, and the National University College (NUC) in Arecibo, Bayamón, Caguas, Ponce and Rio Grande. There is one state-run system, the Puerto Rico Technological Institute in San Juan, which possesses several programs at the local level and whose costs are significantly below market prices. Also, this can be very opinionated depending on what people are pursuing.

- Instituto de Banca y Comercio
- Ponce Paramedical College

=== Colleges and universities ===
The three major university systems on the island are the University of Puerto Rico with 11 campuses, the Ana G. Méndez University System (SUAGM) with 3 major campuses and some satellites, and the Interamerican University of Puerto Rico (Inter) with 9 campuses and 2 specialized schools.

The University of Puerto Rico performs the following"

- Produces more than 80% of all post-secondary research on the island,
- Graduates the largest number of Hispanic engineers in the United States,
- Graduates the largest number of chemical engineers in the United States,
- Graduates the second-largest number of female engineers in the United States,
- Owns the largest number of patents by a university on the island,
- Has the largest enrollment on the island and one of the largest in the United States,
- Has the largest faculty body on the island and one of the largest in the United States,
- Offers the largest number of academic programs on the island and one of the largest in the United States,
- Offers the largest number of doctoral programs on the island,
- Has the largest number of campuses on the island,
- Has the highest ratio of students from the island that enroll in graduate studies,
- Confers the largest number of post-secondary degrees on the island,
- Conducts almost all medical research on the island,
- Is considered the best university in all the Caribbean,
- Its flagship campus has won 24 out of the 97 global cups of the Puerto Rico college athletics, and
- Has graduated six out of ten governors of Puerto Rico.

The system is a source of patronage. Its board of trustees, chancellor, rectors, deans, and program directors change whenever a different political party gains power (about every 4 or 8 years), as the university is a government-owned corporation. Its flagship campus is also prone to student strikes, averaging about one strike every three years that halts the whole campus, with the system as a whole averaging about one strike every five years that halts the whole system. Most strikes derive from the university management attempting to raise the cost per credit the institution offers. This has been $55 per undergraduate credit and $117 per graduate credit. It is highly unlikely that a student graduates with college debt as a full Pell Grant covers most costs for low income students, and those that don't receive a full Pell Grant or a Pell Grant at all can easily cover tuition costs. This economic accessibility comes at a price for the taxpayers of Puerto Rico: 9.6% of the General Budget of the Government of Puerto Rico is automatically assigned to the university by law. In 2008, when the economy shrunk, so did the university's endowment. This resulted in problems for an already highly indebted university incapable of generating enough revenue to maintain itself. Because of this, the board of trustees increased tuition costs, which led to strikes. Other strikes were caused by the suggestion of reducing the percentage automatically assigned to the university. No bill has been filed for such purpose.

The University of Puerto Rico offers the largest academic choices with 472 academic programs of which 32 can lead to a doctorate. UPR is also the only system with a business school, an engineering school, a law school, a nursing school, a school of architecture, and a school of medicine. Almost all its schools and programs rank first on the island although competition has increased in the last decades with private universities gaining track at a fast pace. The Ana G. Méndez System, the Interamerican University, and the University of the Sacred Heart possess a business school with the University of Sacred Heart leading in non-profit management and social enterprise, as well as in communications. The Polytechnic University of Puerto Rico and the Turabo University both have engineering schools with the Polytechnic University leading in computer security and offering the only master's degree in computer science on the island. Ranking regarding law schools is subjective with the University of Puerto Rico School of Law, the Interamerican University of Puerto Rico School of Law, and the Eugenio María de Hostos School of Law considered the best although UPR still leads in constitutional law. The University of Puerto Rico School of Medicine and the University of Puerto Rico School of Dental Medicine lead in medicine and dentistry.

The Interamerican University of Puerto Rico, School of Optometry is the only school of optometry on the island. The Carlos Albizu University leads in psychology. The Metropolitan University leads in environmental management, The UPR leads in environmental science.

In terms of arts, the Atlantic University College leads in digital arts. The Conservatory of Music of Puerto Rico and the Escuela de Artes Plásticas y Diseño de Puerto Rico are considered leaders in music and arts respectively. The school of international relations was created in November 2013 under the name of Morales Carrión Diplomatic and Foreign Relations School, ascribed to the Department of State of Puerto Rico and still in development.

Almost all junior colleges, colleges, universities, and schools are accredited by the Middle States Association of Colleges and Schools. Specific programs tend to possess their respective accreditation as well (such as ABET, AACSB, LCME, and so on) although it is not uncommon for programs to not possess its expected accreditation—for example, only two business schools are accredited by AACSB.

University	Public/Private	Locations
American University of Puerto Rico	Private	Bayamón, Manatí
Atlantic College of Puerto Rico	Private	Guaynabo
Caribbean University	Private	Bayamón, Carolina, Ponce, Vega Baja
Carlos Albizu University	Private	San Juan
Centro de Estudios Avanzados de Puerto Rico y el Caribe	Private	San Juan
Colegio Universitario de San Juan	Public	San Juan
Conservatorio de Música de Puerto Rico	Public	San Juan
Escuela de Artes Plásticas y Diseño de Puerto Rico	Public	San Juan
Facultad de Derecho Eugenio Maria de Hostos	Private	Mayagüez
National University College	Private	Arecibo, Bayamón, Caguas, Ponce, Rio Grande
Polytechnic University of Puerto Rico	Private	San Juan
Ponce School of Medicine	Private	Ponce
Pontífica Universidad Católica de Puerto Rico	Private	Arecibo, Coamo, Mayaguez, Ponce
San Juan Bautista School of Medicine	Private	Caguas
Seminario Evangélico de Puerto Rico	Private	Rio Piedras
Universidad Adventista de las Antillas	Private	Mayagüez
Universidad Central de Bayamón	Private	Bayamón
Universidad Central del Caribe	Private	Bayamón
Universidad de Puerto Rico	Public	Aguadilla, Arecibo, Bayamón, Carolina, Cayey, Humacao, Mayagüez, Ponce, San Juan, Utuado
Universidad del Este	Private	Cabo Rojo, Carolina, Manatí, Santa Isabel, Utuado, Yauco
Universidad del Sagrado Corazón	Private	San Juan
Universidad del Turabo	Private	Gurabo
Universidad Interamericana de Puerto Rico	Private	Aguadilla, Arecibo, Barranquitas, Bayamón, Fajardo, Guayama, Ponce, San Germán, San Juan
Universidad Metropolitana	Private	Aguadilla, Bayamón, Jayuya, San Juan
University of Phoenix	Private	Guaynabo

See List of colleges and universities in Puerto Rico

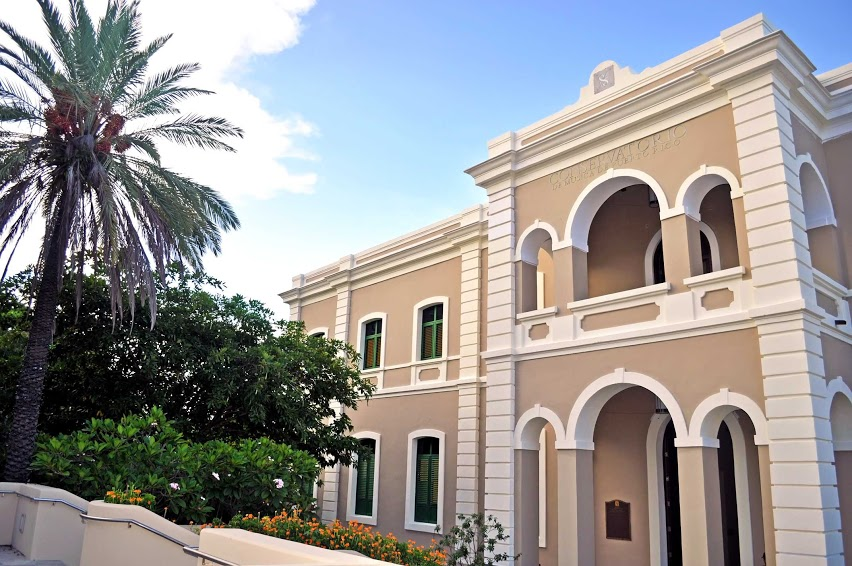
Conservatory of Music of Puerto Rico

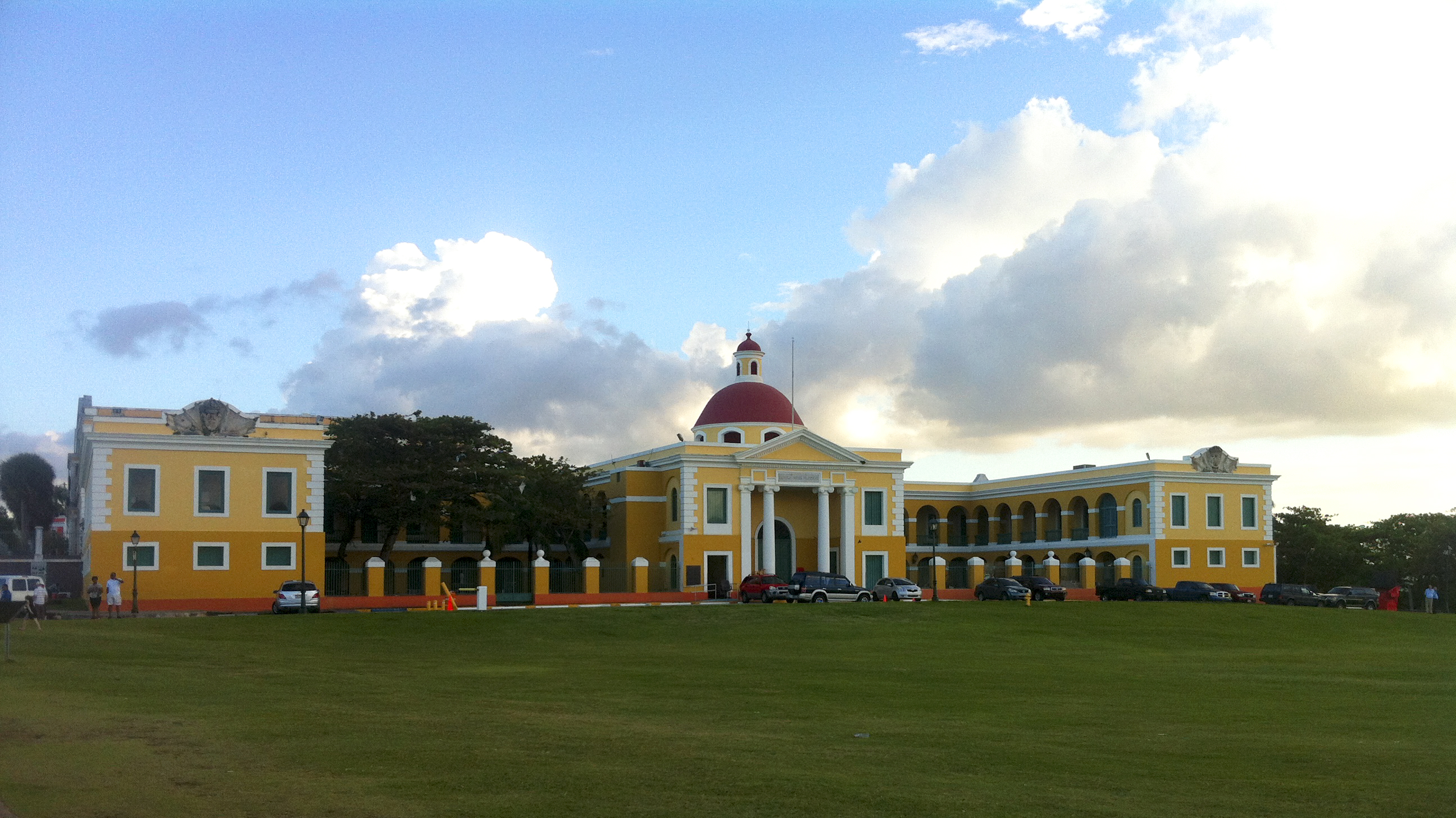
The School of Plastic Arts of Puerto Rico

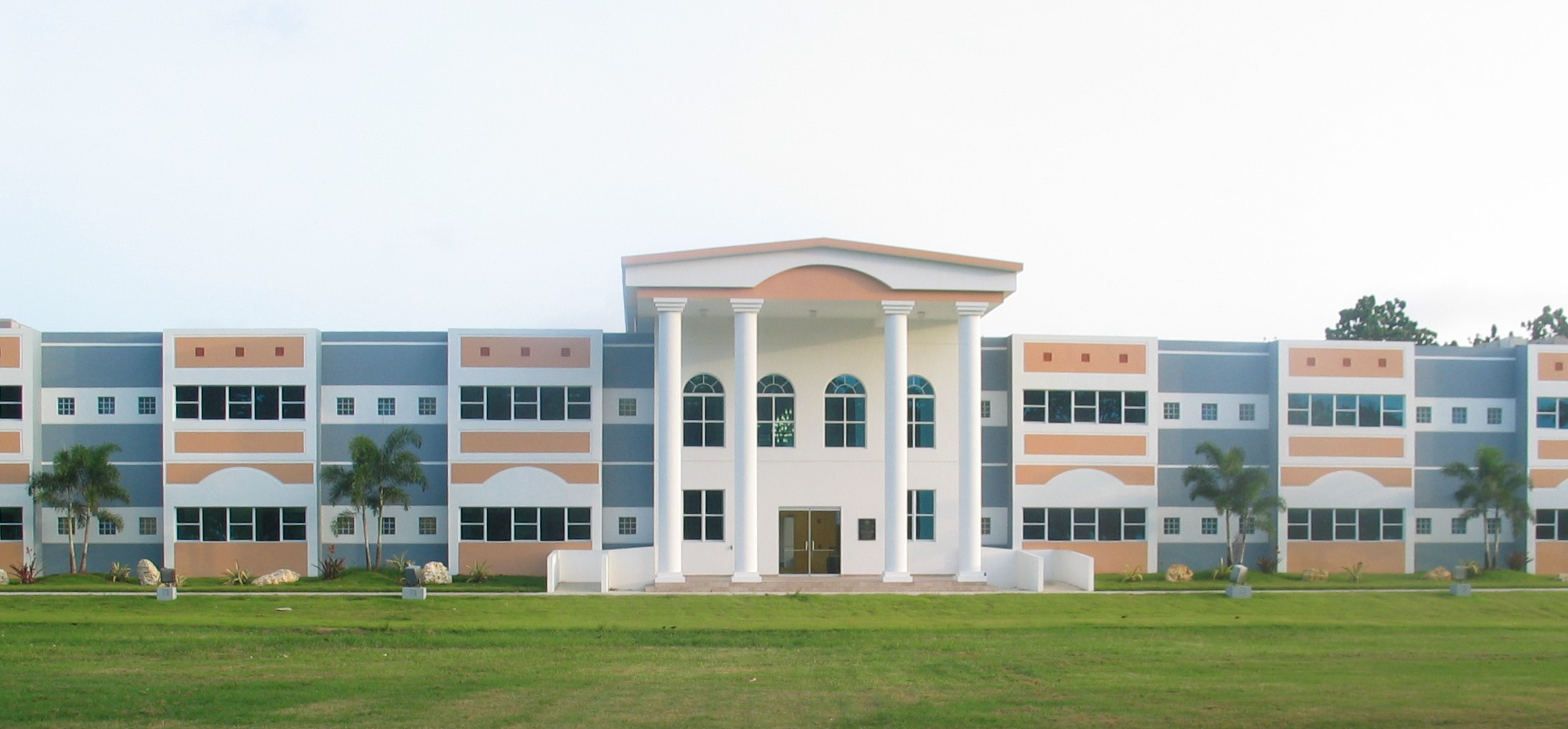
Pontifical Catholic University of Puerto Rico School of Law (PUCPR), Ave. Las Americas, Bo. Canas Urbano, Ponce, Puerto Rico

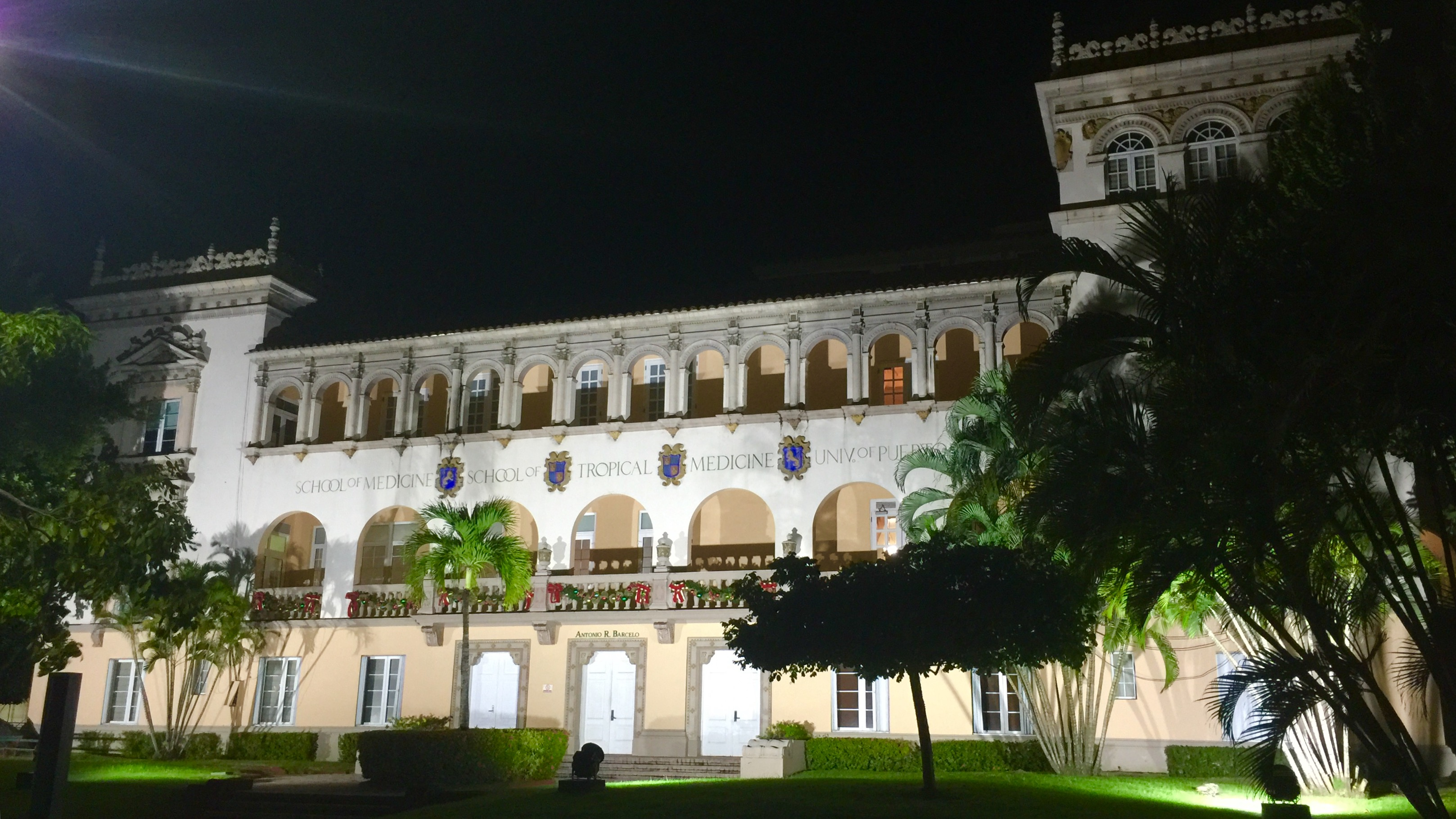
School of Tropical Medicine (Puerto Rico)

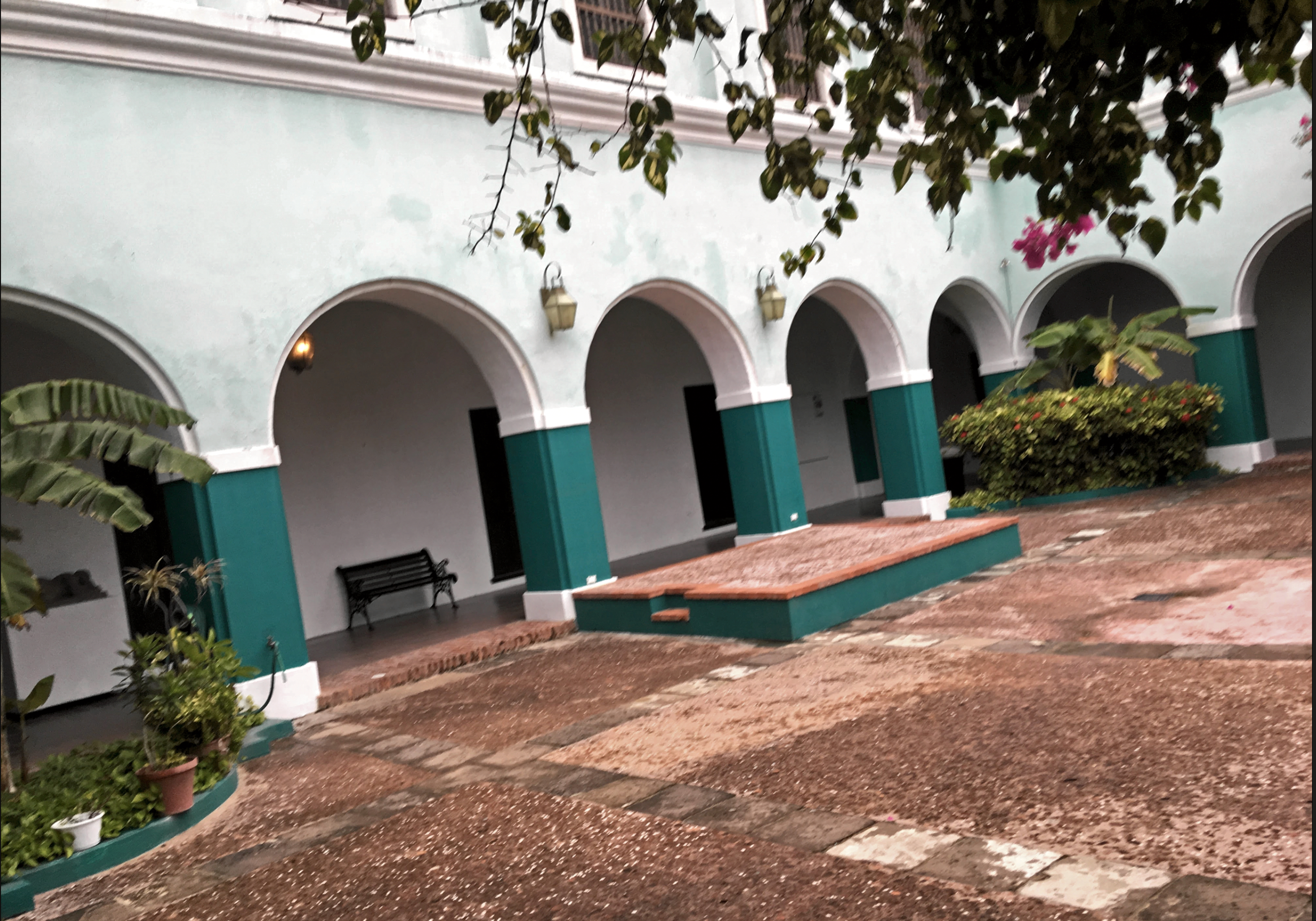
Center for Advanced Studies on Puerto Rico and the Caribbean

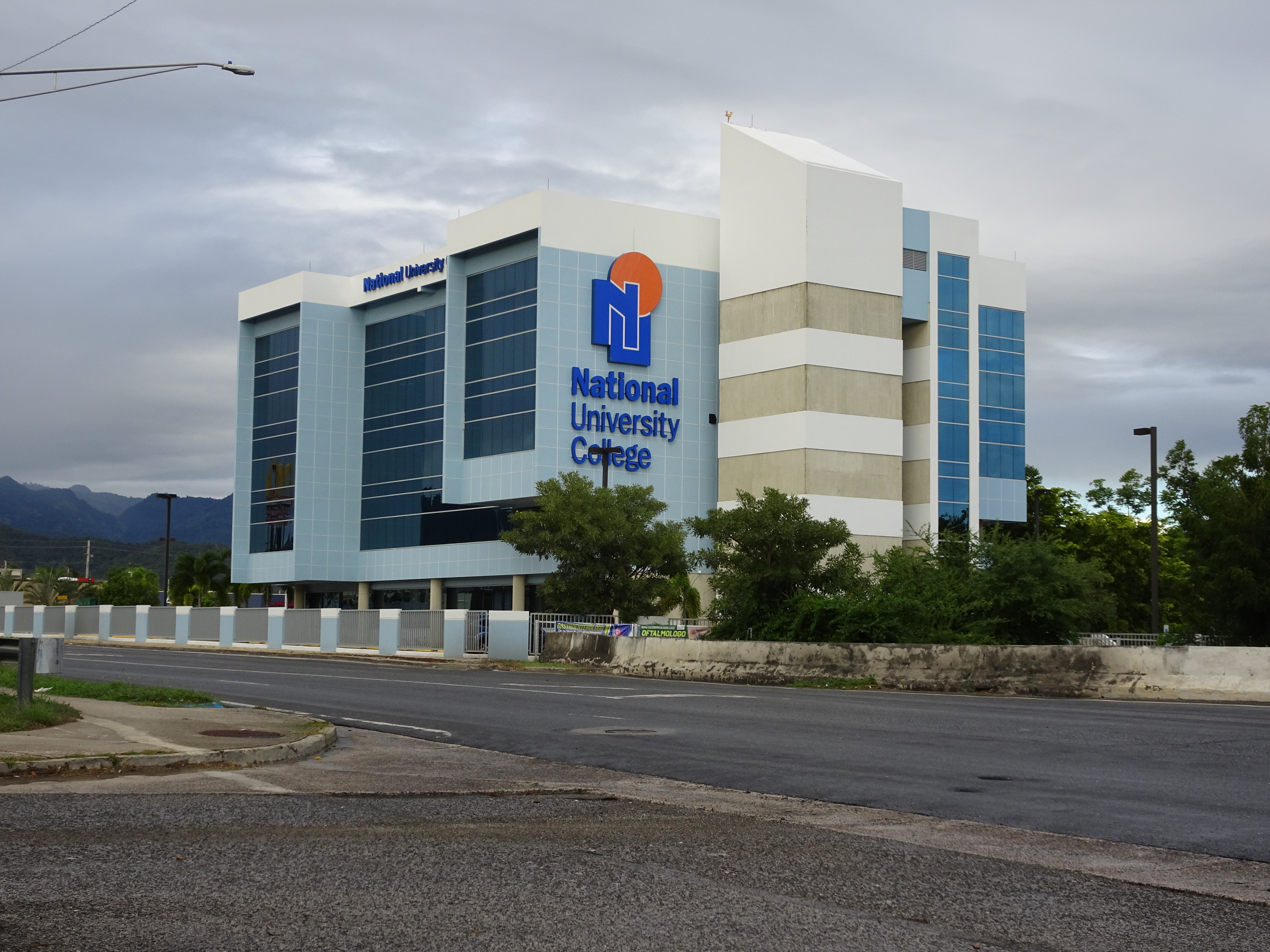
National University College, PR-506, Bo. Coto Laurel, Ponce, Puerto Rico

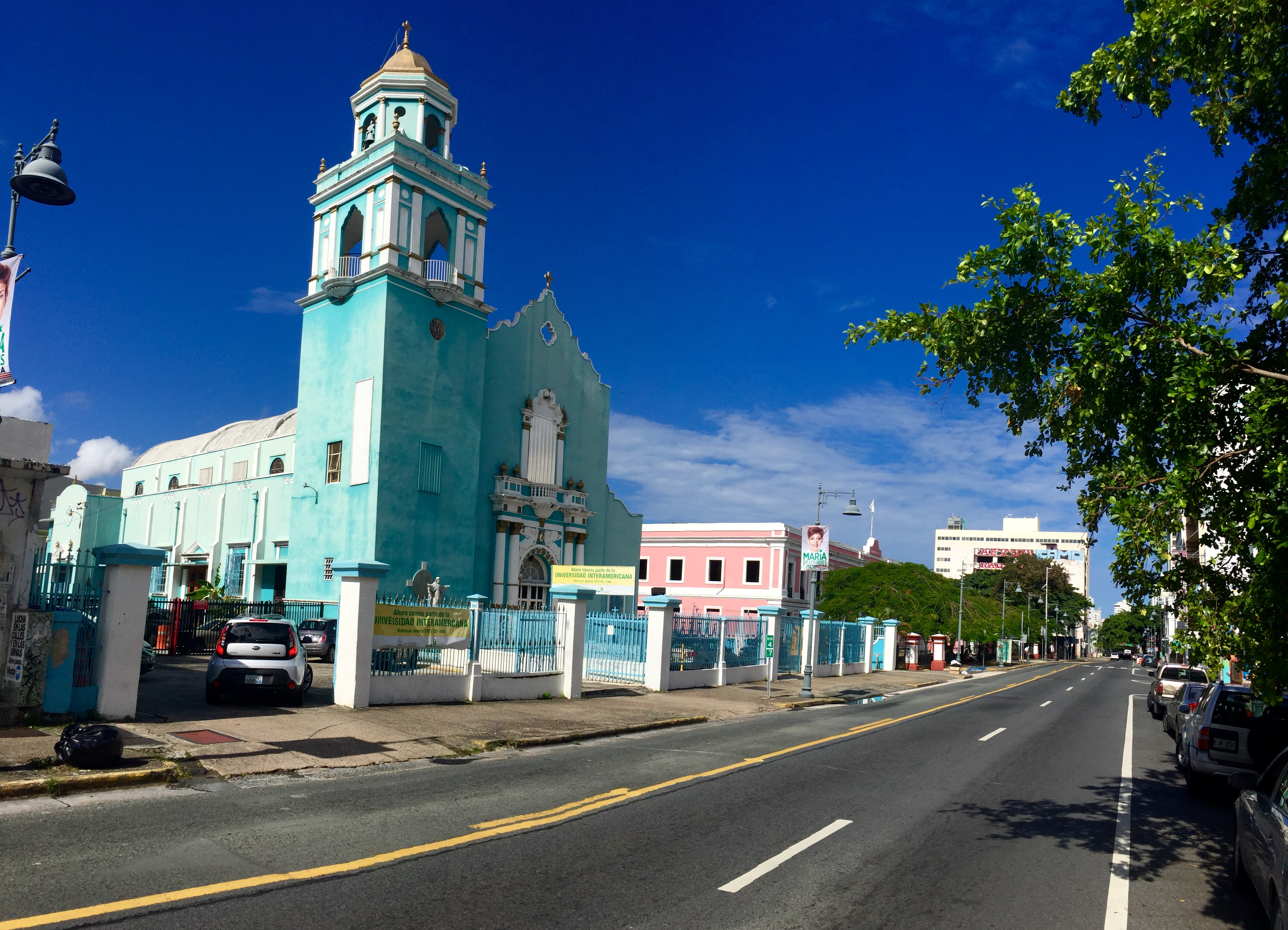
Parroquia Sagrado Corazón de Jesús church building (which became part of the Universidad Interamericana in 2016) is located in Santurce, Puerto Rico

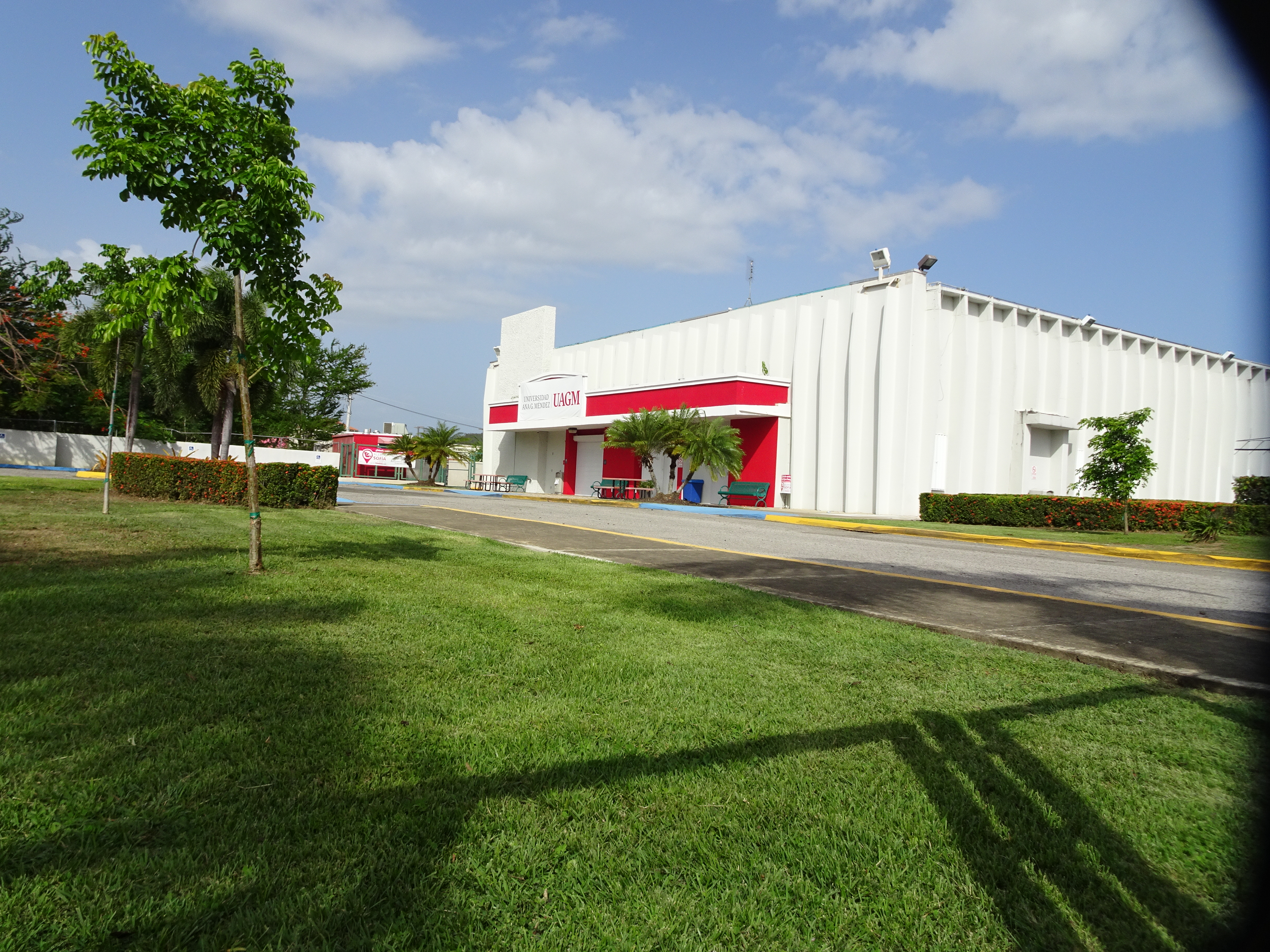
Univ. Ana G. Méndez, Ave. Tito Castro (PR-14), Bo. Machuelo Abajo, Ponce, Puerto Rico

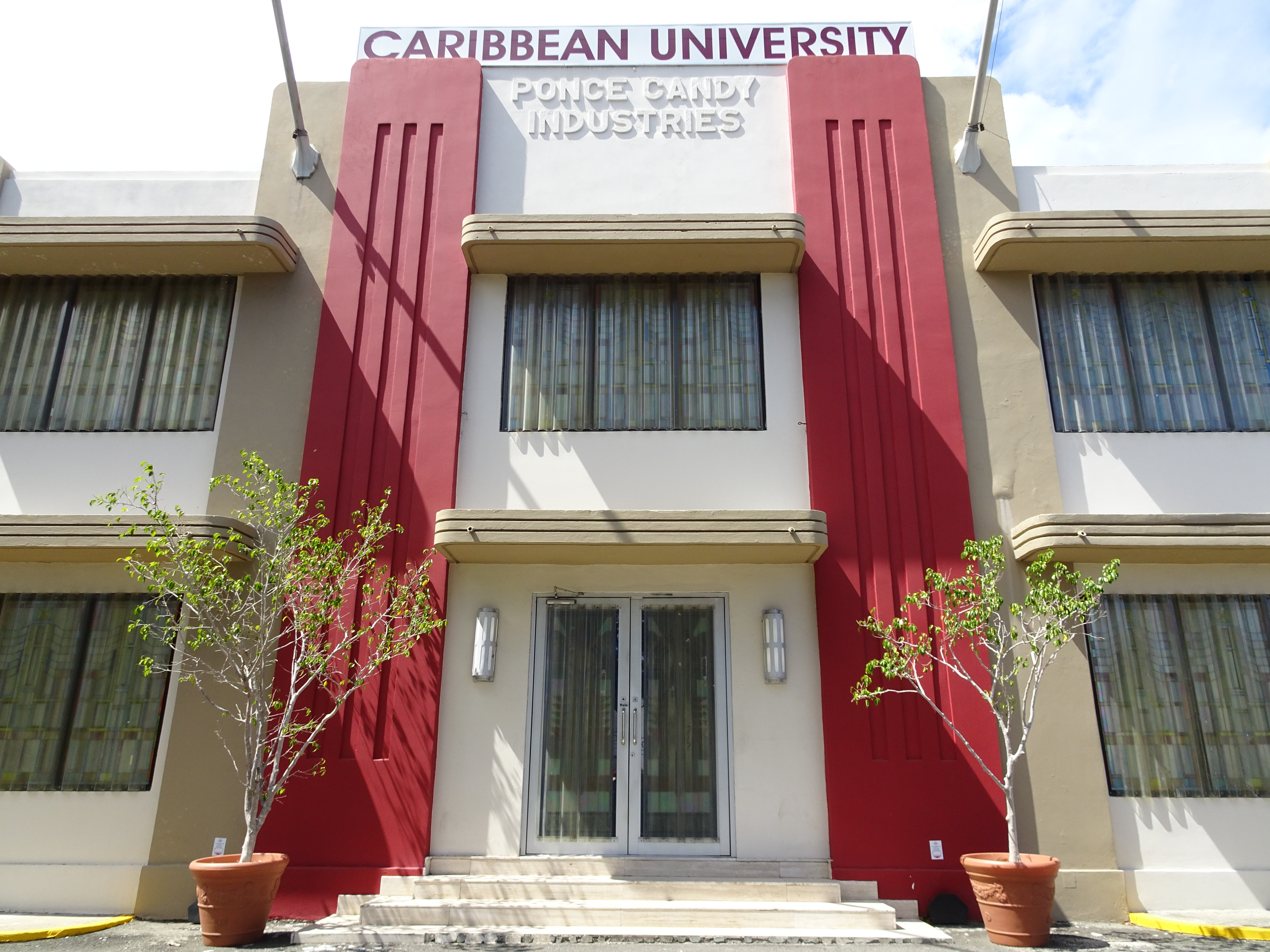
Edificio Ponce Candy Industries, Bo. Sabanetas, Ponce, Puerto Rico

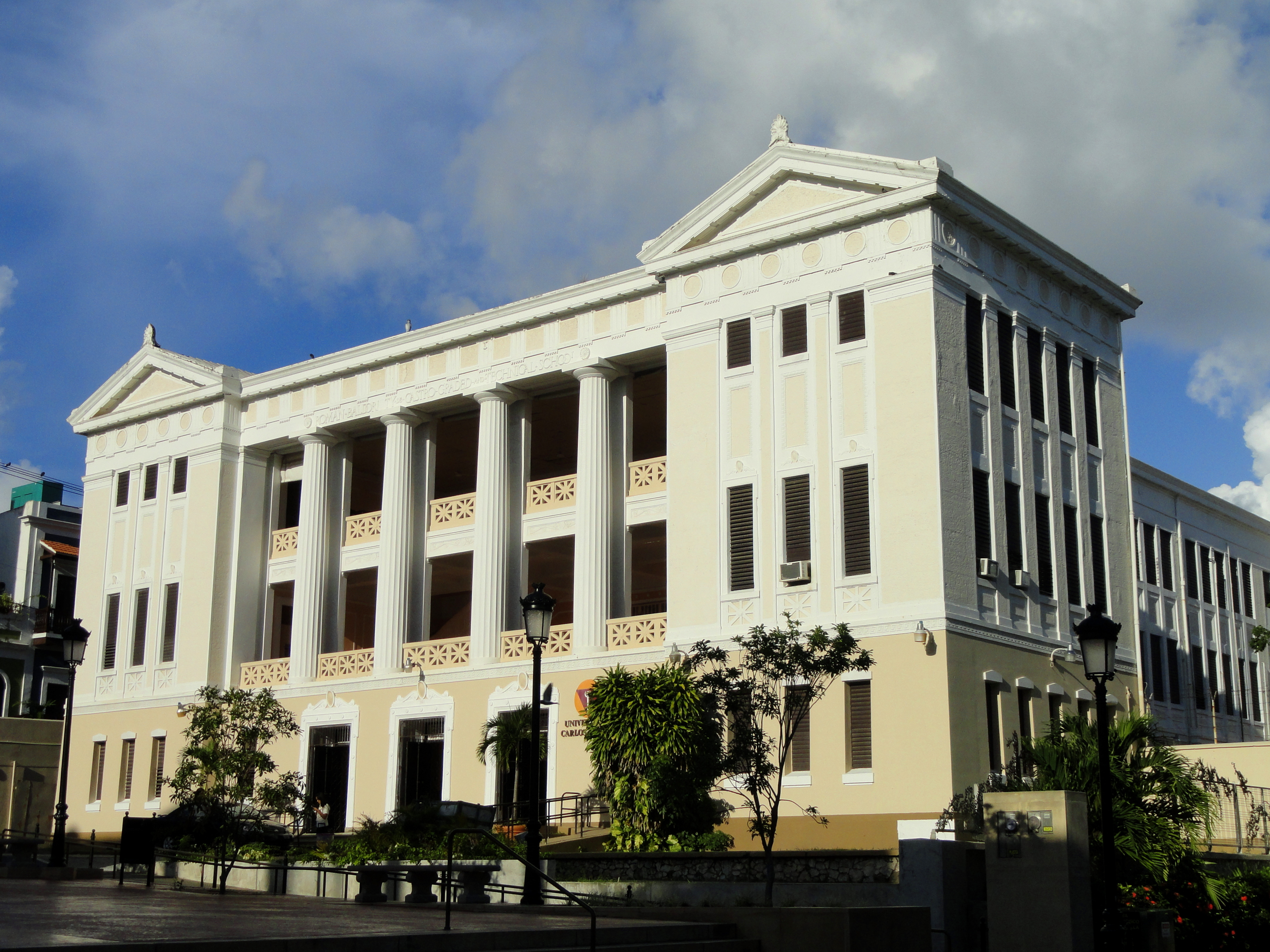
Carlos Albizu University (San Juan Campus), Old San Juan, Puerto Rico

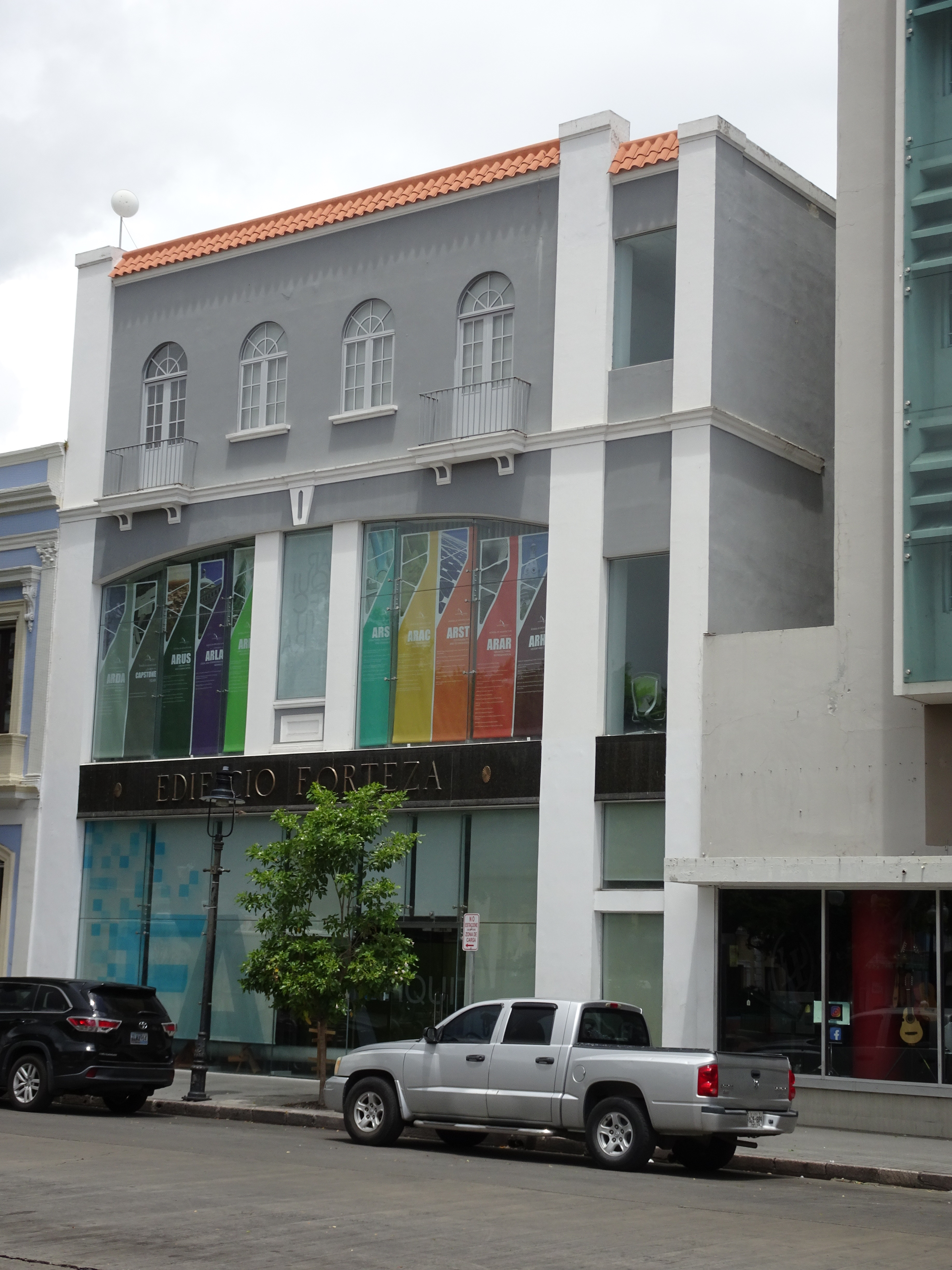
PUCPR Escuela de Arquitectura, C. Marina, Bo. Tercero, Ponce, Puerto Rico

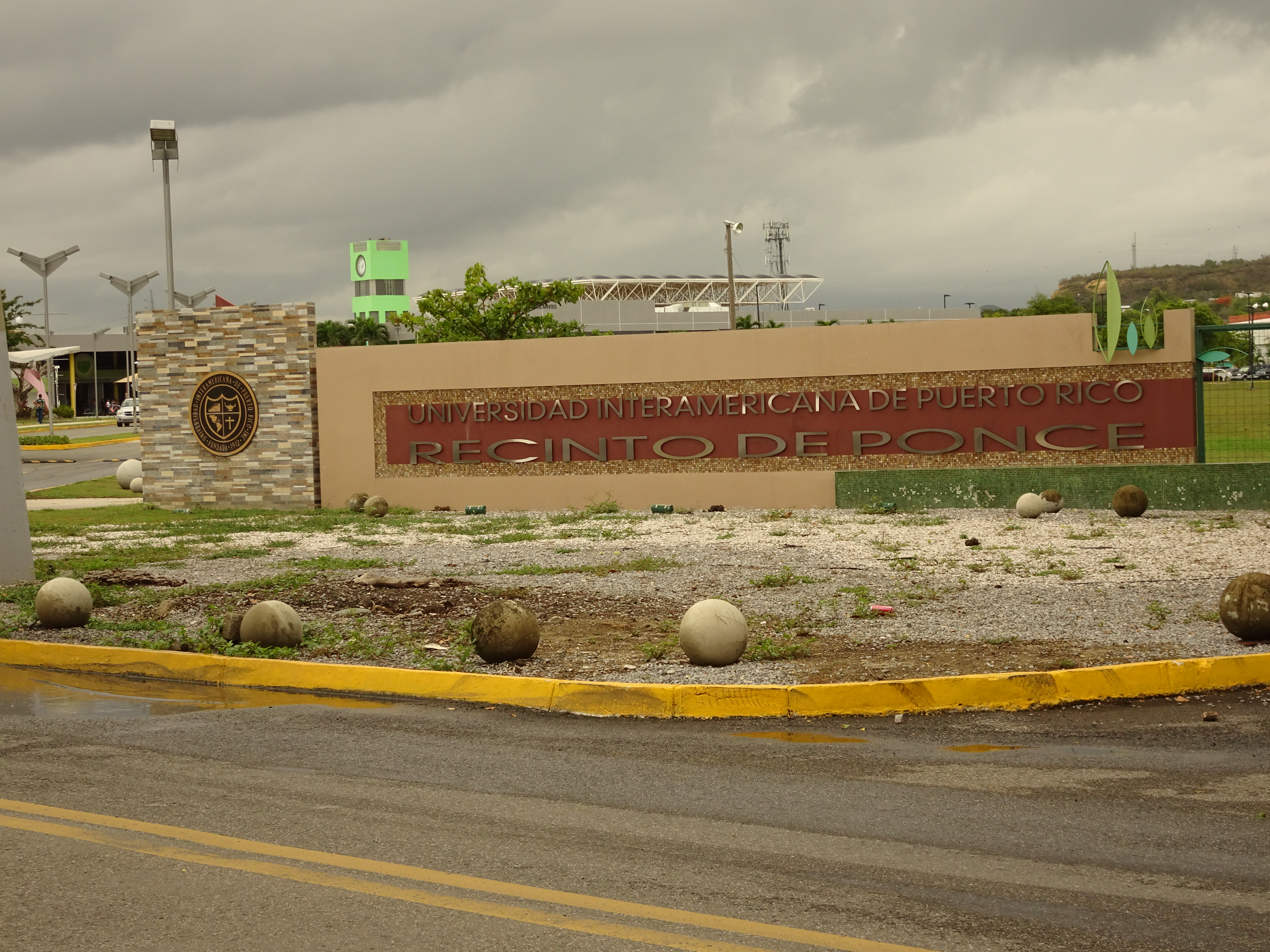
Univ. Interamericana, entrada, Bo. Sabanetas, Ponce, Puerto Rico

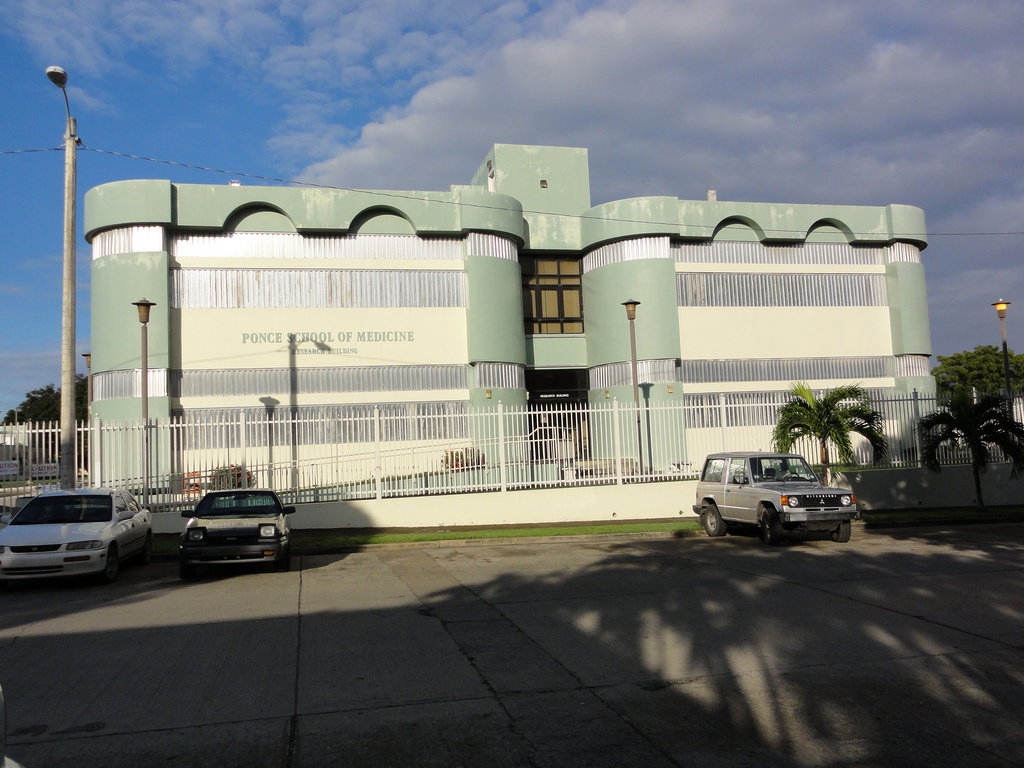
Ponce Health Sciences University Research building in Barrio Playa in Ponce, Puerto Rico

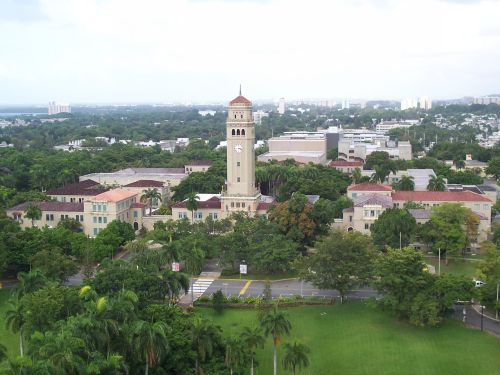
University of Puerto Rico

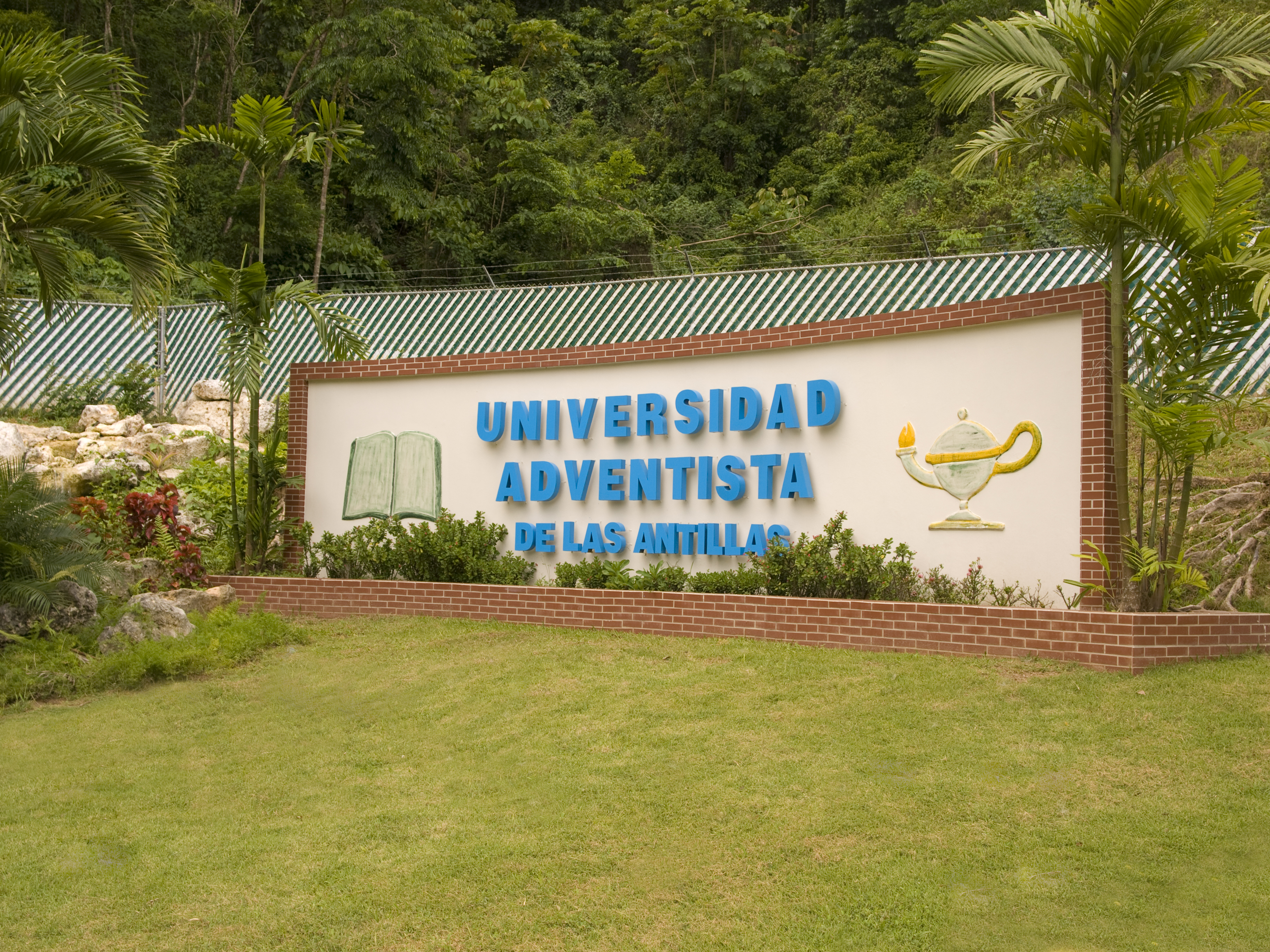
Adventist University of the Antilles

== Contemporary issues ==
=== Dropout rate ===
A study showed that about 19.10% of all students do not finish 9th grade.

According to the census, the high school graduation rate was 73.9% as of 2016. Some mainland US citizens question whether the median household income contributes; Puerto Rico's median household income is less than $20,000, with 43% of people in poverty.

=== Current educational issues ===
The government announced the closure of 283 schools and a new pilot plan for charter schools and vouchers. From 2010 to 2018 a total of 682 schools where closed of which only 17 where sold afterward. The school system has lost about 38,762 students since May 2017 due to closing of schools. In addition, between August 2017 and January 2018 another 27,000 students will be out of the school systems. Some of the schools don't have running water or electricity. Education Secretary Julia Keleher has mentioned that they will save $150 million by closing most of the schools. However, on March 29, 2018, Gov. Ricardo Rosselló signed a bill that will allow charter schools and voucher programs to be established. The governments are trying to cut funding from education in order to restore the island after all the hurricanes that hit Puerto Rico.

Teachers have also lost their jobs. Based on United Federation of Teachers, it mentioned more than 2,600 teachers have received a letter saying they were excessed. Also, no teacher has received a raise since 2008 and beginning teachers earn $1,750 a month, although the cost of living is 10 percent higher than on the US mainland.

=== Parents' participation ===
A January 2014 news report stated that 55 percent of parents with children in public schools picked up their children's grades for the first semester of 2013–2014 school year on the scheduled day.

=== Poor performance in public schools ===
According to the Economist Intelligence Unit, 95% of public school students in Puerto Rico graduate at a sub-basic level while 60% do not even graduate. Furthermore, according to the Department of Education of Puerto Rico in 2012, 39% of public school students perform at a basic level (average performance) in Spanish in the Puerto Rican Tests of Academic Achievement. Likewise, 36% perform at a basic level in Mathematics while 35% perform at a basic level in English and 43% at a basic level in Science in said tests.

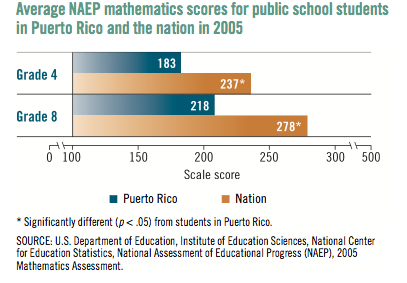
NAEP scores 2005

Moreover, studies published in 2003, 2005, and 2007 by the United States National Center for Education Statistics as part of the National Assessment of Educational Progress (NAEP) concluded that Puerto Rico falls below basic levels when compared to the United States – being basic defined as "partial mastery of the knowledge and skills that are fundamental for proficient work" according to NAEP. In particular the findings showed that:

- Overall, fourth- and eighth-grade students in Puerto Rico scored lower, on average, than public school students in the continental United States.
- 12% of students in Puerto Rico scored at or above basic in fourth grade in comparison to the continental United States, where 79% of students scored at or above basic in the same grade.
- 6% of students in Puerto Rico scored at or above basic in eighth grade in comparison to the United States where 68% of students in the United States scored at or above basic in the same grade.

As a result of this, 1,321 out of 1,466 public schools in Puerto Rico (about 90%) do not comply with the academic progress requirements established by the No Child Left Behind Act.

In 2013, the Nation's Report Card concluded that Puerto Rico falls below basic levels when compared to the United States. In particular the findings showed that:

- Overall, fourth- and eighth-grade students in Puerto Rico scored lower, on average, than public school students in the United States.
- 11% of students in Puerto Rico scored at or above basic in fourth grade in comparison to the continental United States, where 89% of students scored at or above basic in mathematics.
- 5% of students in Puerto Rico scored at or above basic in eighth grade in comparison to the United States where 95% of students in the United States scored at or above basic in Mathematics.

Also, the Nation's Report Card reported an average of 309 students per school in P.R., where in United States there are 504 students per school.

In 2017, Puerto Rico ranked last behind the 50 U.S. states in fourth-grade and eighth-grade math scores on the National Assessment of Educational Progress tests.

=== Market demand for college graduates ===
Puerto Rico is atypical as many youngsters pursue post-secondary studies even though the local market has no demand for them. For example, in 2012 50,000 students graduated at the undergraduate and graduate level while the labor market generated about 6,000 jobs per year of which 25% of those required that level of education. (Note: Calderón (2013; in Spanish) "En 2012, se graduaron cerca de 50,000 estudiantes de nivel subgraduado y graduado y se proyectaba que el mercado laboral generara en promedio cerca de 6,000* empleos por año, de los cuales sólo el 25% requiere esos niveles de educación.") This effectively means that the Puerto Rican market has no demand for 97% of those who graduate with an undergraduate or graduate degree in Puerto Rico, although many find jobs off the island.

== Notable Puerto Rico educators ==
- Lolita Tizol
- Alfredo M. Aguayo
- Mariano Villaronga-Toro
- María Teresa Babín
- Elías López Sobá
- Eugenio María de Hostos

== Bibliography ==
- Cruz Monclova, Lidio (2006). La Educación en Puerto Rico en el Siglo XIX. Editorial Ultra. ISBN 9781497308350.
- Rivera Hernández, Ángel L. (2006). El Sindicalismo y El Magisterio Puertorriqueño. Ediciones SITUM. ISBN 1596081422.
