= T3P =

T3P may refer to:

- Glyceraldehyde 3-phosphate
- Propanephosphonic acid anhydride
