= Templo del Maestro =

- U.S. National Register of Historic Places
- U.S. Historic district – Contributing property
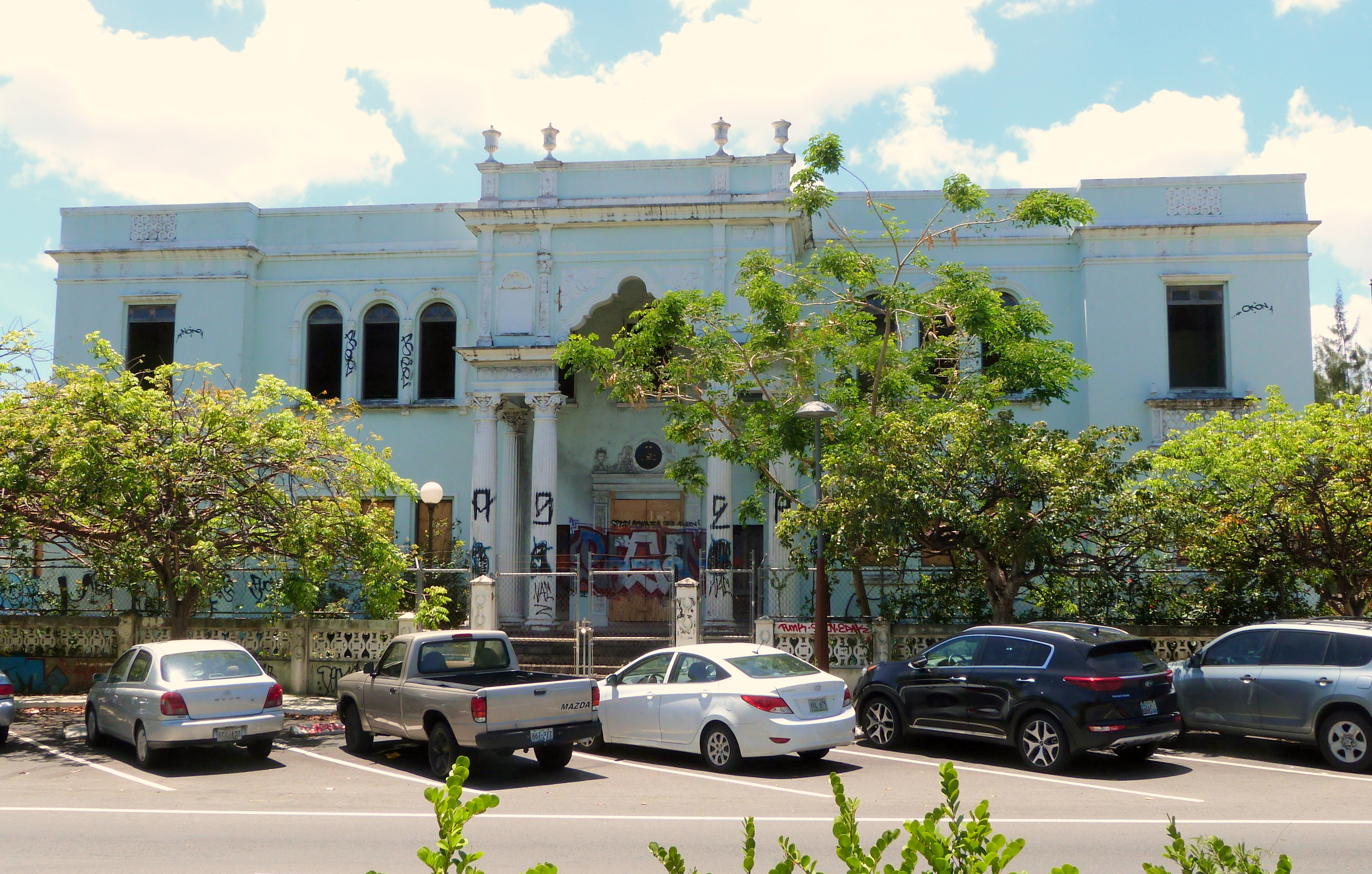
- Templo del Maestro in 2017

- Location within Puerto Rico
- Location: Constitución Ave., Stop 8 San Juan, Puerto Rico
- Coordinates: 18°27′46″N 66°05′24″W
- Built: 1935
- Architect: Joseph O'Kelly
- Architectural style: Beaux Arts
- Part of: Puerta de Tierra Historic District (ID100002936)
- NRHP reference No.: 16000189

Significant dates
- Added to NRHP: April 19, 2016
- Designated CP: October 15, 2019

Templo del Maestro (Spanish for 'Temple of the Teacher') is a historic Beaux Arts building from 1935 that originally served as the seat of the Puerto Rico Teachers Association (Spanish: Asociación de Maestros de Puerto Rico). The building faces the Luis Muñoz Rivera Park and Supreme Court Building across Juan Ponce de León Avenue in the Puerta de Tierra historic district, a sequence of historically and culturally significant buildings and monuments that includes the Puerto Rico National Library, the Athenaeum and El Capitolio.

== Design & history ==
Templo del Maestro was designed by Joseph O'Kelly in the Beaux-Arts style of Classical Revival architecture; it particularly integrates elements inspired by Moorish and Mughal architecture, evident in its multifoil arches, courtyard arcades and geometrical façade ornamentations. It was then built by civil engineer Gabriel Martínez Guzmán, and inaugurated in a public ceremony led by Puerto Rico governor Blanton C. Winship in which it was blessed by Edwin Byrne, the then Bishop of San Juan. In addition to the Puerto Rico Teachers Association, the building also hosted numerous political and legal events such as the 1937 Hays Committee hearings on the language of use in public education and in defense of civil liberties in the aftermath of events such as the 1937 Ponce massacre. Templo del Maestro served as the headquarters of the Puerto Rico Teachers Association for only seven years. It was then used by the United States Army and Navy as a recreational and social facility for the nearby Naval Air Station of Isla Grande (today the Fernando Luis Ribas Dominicci Airport) until the end of World War II when it temporarily passed on to the Commission of Parks and Recreation (now known as the Puerto Rico Department of Sports and Recreation) due to its proximity to other government buildings and the Sixto Escobar Stadium. The last tenant was the Bureau of Special Investigations of the Puerto Rico Department of Justice which made infrastructural upgrades to the building. The building was last owned by the Industrial Development Company of Puerto Rico (PRIDCO). Although there was public interest in revitalizing the building and opening it as the new seat of the Puerto Rican Academy of Jurisprudence and Legislation (Academia Puertorriqueña de Jurisprudencia y Legislación) in 2017, as of 2023 it remains abandoned and its interior in a state of decay. Despite its current state the building retains its architectural integrity, and it was added to the National Register of Historic Places in 2016.

== See also ==
- Architecture of Puerto Rico
- Education in Puerto Rico
