= Hostos–Ramírez de Arellano School District =

- U.S. National Register of Historic Places
- U.S. Historic district
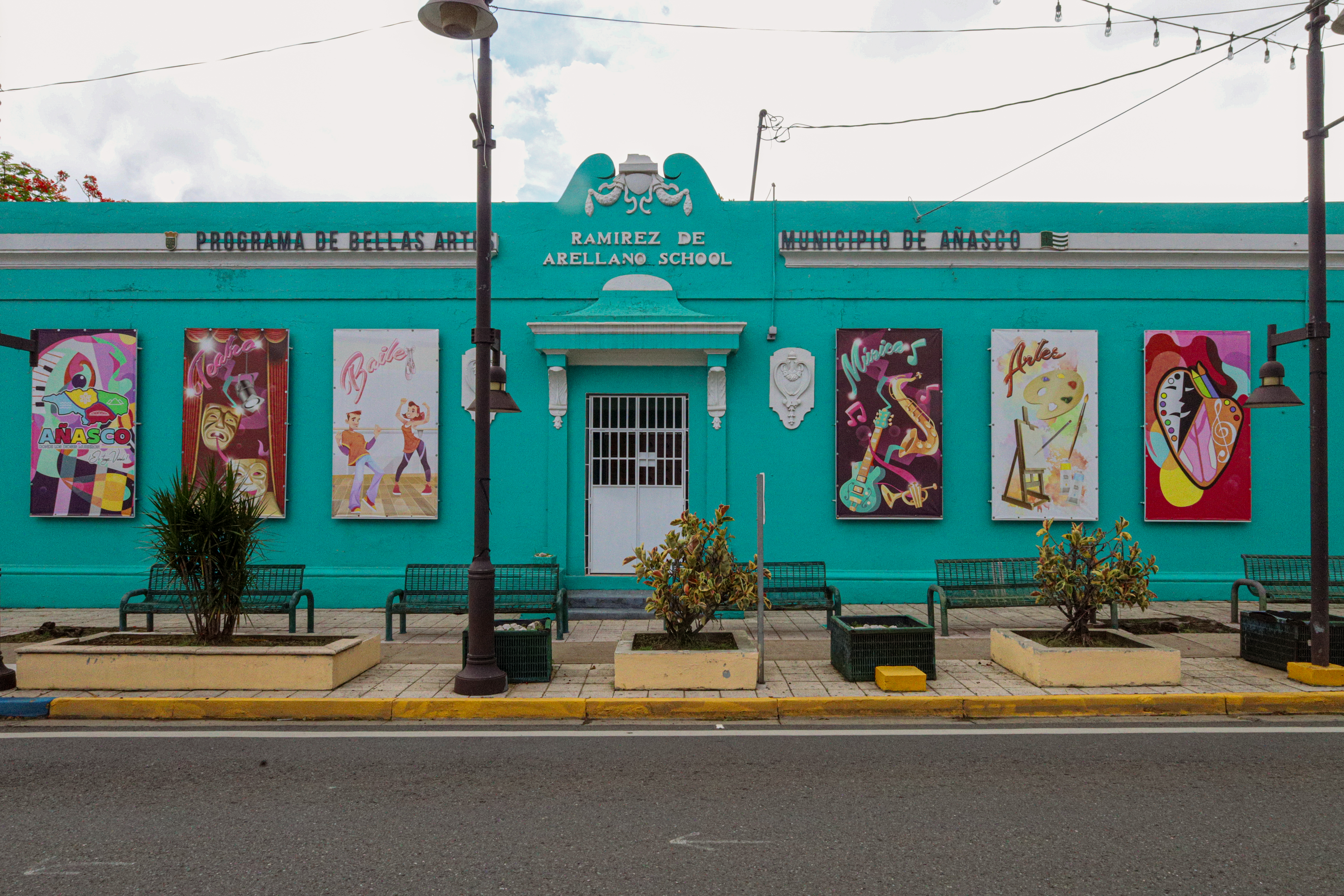
- Sergio Ramírez de Arellano School

- Location within Puerto Rico
- Location: San Antonio Street/65 de Infantería Street Añasco, Puerto Rico
- Coordinates: 18°16′57″N 67°08′30″W
- Built: 1903
- Architect: Charles G. Post, E.B. Homer
- Architectural style: Classical Revival
- MPS: Early Twentieth Century Schools in Puerto Rico
- NRHP reference No.: 100001762
- Added to NRHP: October 23, 2017

The Hostos–Ramírez de Arellano School District is a historic school complex located in the downtown (barrio-pueblo) of Añasco, Puerto Rico, consisting of the Eugenio María de Hostos Graded School (Spanish: Escuela Primaria Eugenio María de Hostos) and the Sergio Ramírez de Arellano School (Escuela Sergio Ramírez de Arellano), located in the same block as the San Antonio Abad Parish Church across from the main town square of Añasco.

This is the oldest school complex to be founded in the town (and the oldest surviving concrete buildings in Añasco Pueblo), part of an island-wide program of school constructions sponsored by modernization projects, first by the military government and afterwards by the department of education. The Eugenio María de Hostos school, consisting of a single story C-shaped building with four classrooms was built first in 1903, while the Sergio Ramírez de Arellano School, consisting of a single story six classroom building was completed in 1909. The two schools are separated by a small shared courtyard with a fountain and smaller building annexes.

The public complex closed during the end of the 20th century and served as the private Alcides Figueroa Bilingual School from 1999 to 2016, when the school moved to a different building. The school complex was added to the United States National Register of Historic Places in 2017 for its importance as a prime example as one of the earliest school buildings of its type in the island, and listed under the "Early Twentieth Century Schools in Puerto Rico" multiple property submission (MPS) listing. The complex today serves as a community center as part of a regional cultural project known as Ciudad Museo.

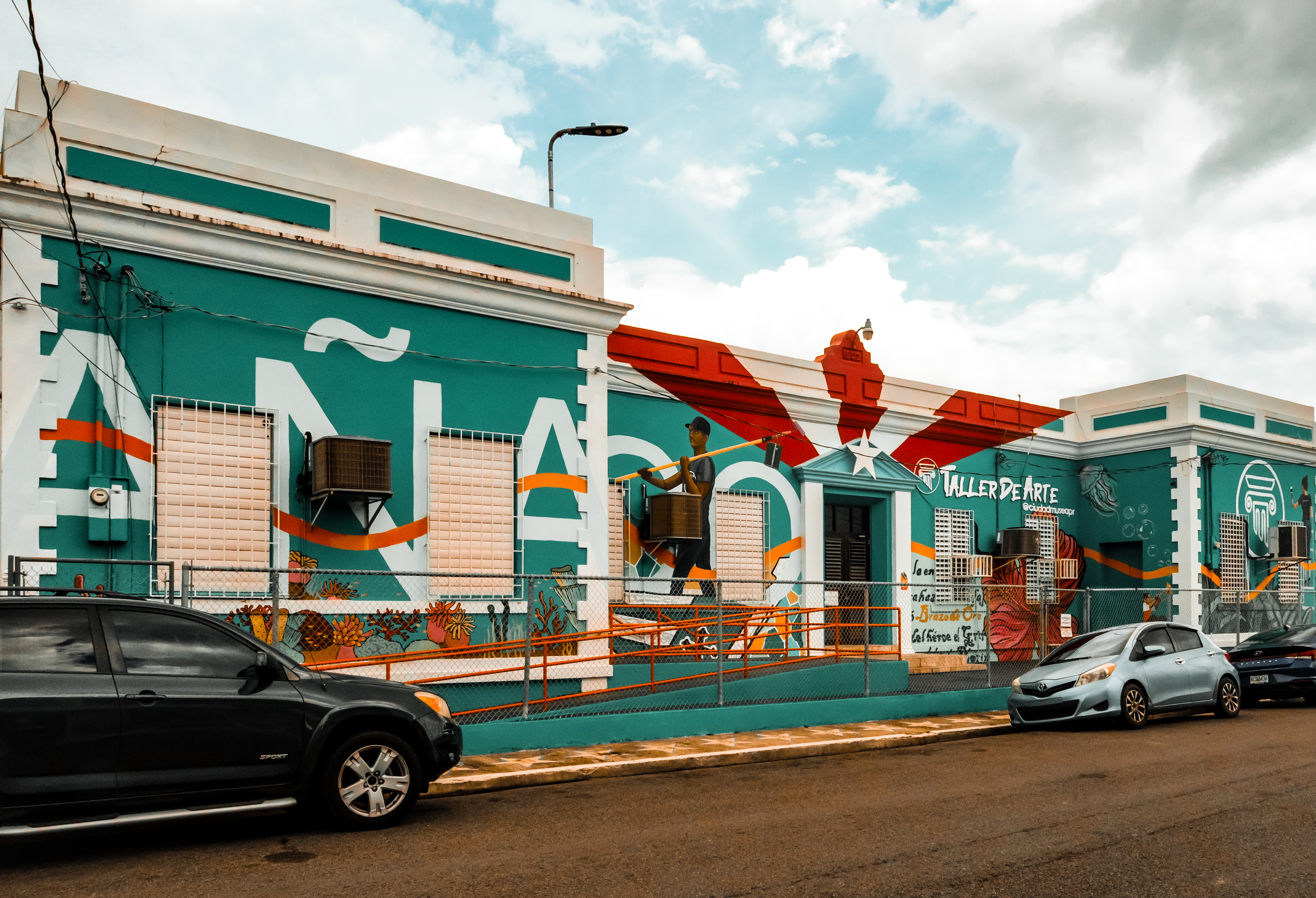
Former Eugenio María de Hostos Graded School
