= Pilar Barbosa Education Program =

The Pilar Barbosa Education Program is a program in Puerto Rico created as a means to provide professional development training opportunities for public school practitioners and educators in that city. The program serves as a catalyst for long term educational realignment using the graduates as agents of sustainable reform in the public school system.

== The program ==
On July 27, 1997, the Senate of Puerto Rico approved law #53, authored by Sen. Kenneth McClintock, a Barbosa protégé, which created "The Pilar Barbosa Program of Educational Interns". The program was later renamed "The Pilar Barbosa Educational Internship Program."

Program participants are K-12 public school teachers and administrators from Puerto Rico. Every summer, 25 participants go to Washington, D.C. to take part in a myriad of activities including workshops, tours, lectures and group assignments that focus on U.S. education trends and policies in the context of Puerto Rico, integration of technology in the curriculum, innovative curriculum design, and educational leadership.

Close to 300 public school educators have participated in the program since its inception. The Washington Center for Internships and Academic Seminars successfully administered the Pilar Barbosa Education Internship Program in Washington, D.C. the summers of 1998, 1999, 2000, 2002, 2003, 2005–2009. The Washington Center provides an integrated academic and work experience to prepare participants for lives of leadership, professional achievement, and civic engagement.

== Goals and themes ==
The Pilar Barbosa Internship Program is designed within the context of four basic themes: Leadership in Education, Federal Education Policies in the Context of Puerto Rico, 21st Century Teaching and Integration of Technology in the Classroom.

Leadership in education allows participants to look into education trends and how they may impact K-12 education in Puerto Rico. Federal education policies in the context of Puerto Rico focuses primarily on No Child Left Behind and other federal education issues. 21st century teaching looks particularly into various models on innovative teaching in math and science, and strategies for curriculum integration. Finally, models for utilizing technology in the classroom demonstrate practical uses of multimedia in K-12 teaching.

The Pilar Barbosa Education Internship Program delivers on these themes using a series of seminars, orientations, panels, workshops and visits to educational facilities, through which participants broaden their perspectives about innovating education in Puerto Rico.
