= Puerto Rico Teachers Association =

One of the trade unions that represents teachers in Puerto Rico

- Asociación de Maestros de Puerto Rico
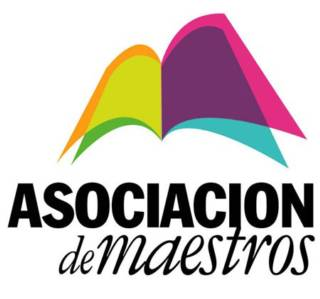
- Founded: July 8, 1911 (115 years ago)
- Headquarters: San Juan, Puerto Rico
- Location: Puerto Rico
- Website: amprnet.org

The Puerto Rico Teachers Association (Spanish: Asociación de Maestros de Puerto Rico) is one of the trade unions that represents teachers in Puerto Rico. Its mission is to promote and defend the right of every person to free secular public education. It is one of the oldest organizations based in Puerto Rico, tracing back its history to 1911. In Puerto Rico, it serves as one of the main education unions along the Teachers' Federation of Puerto Rico (FMPR) and Educadores Puertorriqueños en Acción.

== History ==
The AMPR was created in 1908 as the Asociación Puertorriqueña de Maestros, being joined by the Asociación Insular del Magisterio a year later. Both collaborated closely and eventually fused together to form the current incarnation. In 1966, teachers from Escuela Vocacional Miguel Such created the FMPR as direct competition to the AMPR, eventually outnumbering it and affiliating with the AFT.

By the 1990s, a lack of collaboration and direct competition between the different teacher's unions was evident. In 1998, the AMPR was voted as the representative of the public system educators in accordance to the parameters of Law 45. The next year, the vote fabored the FMPR, fueling the competition between both.

== See also ==
- Templo del Maestro
