= PAA (test) =

The PAA or Prueba de Aptitud Académica is an educational assessment that is used to help universities across Latin America select incoming students. More specifically, it is a standardized test for university admissions. It is offered by College Board Puerto Rico y America Latina (CBPRAL), part of the College Board. The PAA is not a translation of the Scholastic Aptitude Test used in the United States and it is developed independently from the SAT, even though the PAA measures the same constructs as the SAT. While the CBPRAL is based in San Juan, Puerto Rico, the PAA is delivered in a range of Spanish-speaking countries.

The third generation of the PAA assesses students on three components: Verbal Reasoning, Mathematical Reasoning, and Indirect Writing. Scores on each section range from 200 to 800. The fourth generation of the PAA, launched in Puerto Rico in December 2017, assesses three components: Reading and Writing, Mathematics, and English as a Second Language. A 200- to 800-point scale is used for each component. This use of scaled scoring for a test score is typical of many assessments, as it facilitates score reporting after test equating.

Research has supported the reliability and validity of the PAA.
