= Teachers' Federation of Puerto Rico =

Teachers union in Puerto Rico

FMPR
- Teachers' Federation of Puerto Rico
- Federación de Maestros de Puerto Rico
- Headquarters: San Juan, Puerto Rico
- Location: Puerto Rico
- Members: 32,000
- Key people: Mercedes Martínez Padilla, President
- Website: fmprblog.wordpress.com

The Teachers' Federation of Puerto Rico (Spanish: Federación de Maestros de Puerto Rico, FMPR) is a trade union federation of teachers in Puerto Rico. With currently 32,000 members, it is one of the most important non-US-aligned unions in the territory. Its primary base is among employees of the Puerto Rico Department of Education. In Puerto Rico, it serves as one of the main education unions along the Puerto Rico Teachers Association (AMPR) and Educadores Puertorriqueños en Acción.

== History ==
The adoption of Law 134 of 1960 and Law 139 of 1961 allowed numerous employees of all government agencies to organize and collectively negotiate. The FMPR was formed in 1966 by union activists, during this time, it was loosely affiliated with the American Federation of Teachers (AFT).

In 1974, Rafael Hernández Colón requested a mandamus to end the teacher's strike led by the FMPR. The Supreme Court of Puerto Rico accepted it, but the union did not comply and a number of the protesters were arrested as a result, including leader Félix Rodríguez. Ultimately, the government agreed to give the teachers a raise and provide more funding for materials and other school functions. The strike would in turn push forward the stance of the teachers in support of syndication for the foreseeable future, being the fuel for many protests and strikes that defied the unconstitutionality attributed to the exercise up to that point. In February 1974, the Movimiento Obrero and Federación Estudiantil Pro Independencia protested before the Departamento de Instruccion Publica (DIP) in support of the FMPR strike. Two years later, the protests to allow the syndication of teachers continued.

By the 1990s, a lack of collaboration and direct competition between the different teacher associations was evident. On May 2, 1997, several unions, community, political and religious organizations marched against privatization policies of the Rosselló administration and in support of syndicates, this while the sale of the Puerto Rico Telephone Company was a hot topic. Public Law 45 of 1998 allowed teachers and other central government employees the right to properly syndicate.

In 1999, Puerto Rico's teachers voted to be represented by FMPR instead of the rival APMR.

The same year, FMPR faced a scandal when its health plan went bankrupt while increasing portions of its budget were going to AFT. This led to growing dissatisfaction throughout the next years.

During this time, the FMPR disaffiliated from the AFT. On May 1, 2000, the FMPR and Department of Education signed the first collective bargain.

In 2003, sitting president Renán Soto was defeated in an election by the leader of the "Compromiso, Democracia, Militancia" faction, Rafael Feliciano, who became new president.

In 2004, this new leadership held a referendum to disaffiliate from the AFT, which approved the measure by 19,400 to 5,882 votes. On April 28, 2006, artists and other groups marched in what was known as Puerto Rico Grita in an attempt to pressure the executive and legislative branches to negotiate a deal that would prevent a partial government shutdown. The negotiation procedure for the second collective bargain began in May 2006. This amidst civilian critics against the public system in regards to the product versus the investment, an increasing desertion rate and declining academic performance. The efforts, however, failed and employees stopped receiving their paychecks in the middle of "Education Week". Meanwhile, negotiations with the Puerto Rican government over new work contracts for teachers did not produce a result. This led to a FMPR assembly vote in November 2007 which approved a strike, should it become necessary. Teachers were forbidden from striking by law and the Puerto Rican government quickly achieved the de-certification of FMPR.

In February 2008, at least 20,000 FMPR-affiliated teachers marched through San Juan. This march achieved the return of the government to negotiations with FMPR, even though it did still not officially recognise the union. After the failure of these negotiations, FMPR led a nine-day strike of around 11,000 members, paralysing education in Puerto Rico. In mid-2008, AMPR raided FMPR, a step that was denounced by independent unions. FMPR finally won the election, staying the representative union of teachers in Puerto Rico.

In January 2014, FMPR joined a 48-hour strike in support of teachers' pensions together with the National Union of Educators and Education Workers, Puerto Rican Educators in Action, National Organization of School Directors of Puerto Rico, Organization of Directors and Scholarly Administrators and its rival AMPR.

FMPR opposed the salary plans for teachers of the Alejandro García Padilla and the Ricardo Rosselló governments. In 2017, FMPR also opposed plans to lay off 3,000 education personnel.

FMPR protested in San Juan in February 2018 against a planned privatisation of 307 schools. The union accused the "charter" school system of being a way of transferring public money into private pockets, motivated by corruption. In March, the union also rejected the privatisation of the Puerto Rico Electric Power Authority and the University of Puerto Rico, again protesting in San Juan. The next year, FMPR sued the Department of Education on behalf of a group of high school teachers in Toa Baja, stating they had not been properly paid.

FMPR challenged AMPR in representation elections in 2021. AMPR had been declared representative union for Puerto Rico's teachers in the meantime.

FMPR led protests through San Juan in February 2022 against a debt adjustment plan that reduced teachers' pensions and increased the retirement age to 63 years.
