= Residential Center of Educative Opportunities of Mayagüez =

Magnet high school in Mayagüez, Puerto Rico

CROEM – Residential Center of Educational Opportunities of Mayaguez
- Centro Residencial de Oportunidades Educativas de Mayagüez

Location
- Mayagüez; Puerto Rico; 18.1763°N 67.0874°W

Information
- Type: Public School, Puerto Rico Department of Education, boarding school
- Established: 1968
- Principal: Mr. Milton Tomassini
- Grades: 9—12
- Website: CROEM PR

The Residential Center of Educational Opportunities of Mayagüez (CROEM) is a magnet high school, in Mayagüez in the United States insular area of Puerto Rico. This is the top special school operated by the Puerto Rico Department of Education, specialized in sciences & math, only the top students of Puerto Rico are selected to study here. This is a boarding school, here students can stay in the living facilities of the school, or also have the option to be a non-resident student. Apart from having college structured classes, schedules and highly prepared professors, come from public and private schools from all around the island. The school is recognized as one of the best on the island according to the Department of Education.

== Accreditation and membership ==
CROEM was founded in the 1967–1968 school year, and was academically adopted in the 1990–1991 school year by the University of Puerto Rico Mayagüez Campus. In the 1992–1993 school year CROEM was inscribed in the Specialized School Unit of the Puerto Rico Department of Education. That same year, in its silver anniversary, it obtained the Blue Ribbon Award, an award of excellence granted by the US Department of Education. The school is accredited by the General Council of Education of Puerto Rico every six years.

== Admissions ==
The admissions process is available to students from across Puerto Rico and is open for the 9th, 10th, 11th and 12th grades. As part of the process of admission, the prospective students must meet some requirements, such as: a standardized test, several letters of recommendation and a GPA higher than 3.50. The school only accepts approximately 300 students per year.

== Location ==
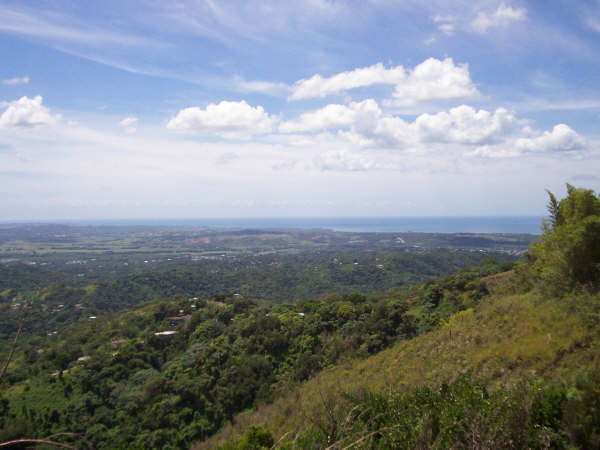
View from CROEM towards the Caribbean Sea

The center is located in State Road 349, km 6.6 of Cerro Las Mesas in Mayagüez, Puerto Rico. It has a panoramic view of 360 degrees where the municipalities of Cabo Rojo, Hormigueros, San Germán and Lajas can be appreciated, as well as the Caribbean Sea.

Due to the high altitude and distance from urban centers, CROEM students are not allowed to leave the center on their own. The convenience of the location is such that it has been used by Federal programs such as The Globe Program.

== Town Fair ==
The Fair celebrated its 40th anniversary on March 3, 2008, having been founded in 1968, and their 50th anniversary in 2018. Among the attendees was Alex Croatto, son of deceased singer Tony Croatto, singer.

== Notable alumni ==
- Luis "Berty" Echevarría CROEM '72. Pediatrician and former mayor of Aguada, Puerto Rico.

== See also ==
- List of high schools in Puerto Rico
- University of Puerto Rico at Mayagüez
