= Propanephosphonic acid anhydride =

Names
- Preferred IUPAC name 2,4,6-Tripropyl-1,3,5,2λ^{5},4λ^{5},6λ^{5}-trioxatriphosphinane-2,4,6-trione
- Other names PPACA; PPAA; T3P; Propylphosphonic anhydride; Allessan CAP

Identifiers
CAS Number	68957-94-8
3D model (JSmol)	Interactive image
ChemSpider	100355
ECHA InfoCard	100.102.078
EC Number	422-210-5
PubChem CID	111923
UNII	I6EGD8839N
CompTox Dashboard (EPA)	DTXSID20219011
- InChI: InChI=1S/C9H21O6P3/c1-4-7-16(10)13-17(11,8-5-2)15-18(12,14-16)9-6-3/h4-9H2,1-3H3 Key: PAQZWJGSJMLPMG-UHFFFAOYSA-N
- SMILES: CCCP1(=O)OP(=O)(OP(=O)(O1)CCC)CCC

Properties
Chemical formula	C_{9}H_{21}O_{6}P_{3}
Molar mass	318.182 g·mol^{−1}

Hazards
- GHS labelling
Pictograms	(GHS07: Exclamation mark)
Signal word	Warning
Hazard statements	H290, H314
Precautionary statements	P234, P260, P264, P280, P301+P330+P331, P303+P361+P353, P304+P340, P305+P351+P338, P310, P321, P363, P390, P404, P405, P501
- Except where otherwise noted, data are given for materials in their standard state (at 25 °C [77 °F], 100 kPa). Infobox references

Propanephosphonic acid anhydride (PPAA, T3P, Allessan CAP) is the trimeric anhydride of n-propylphosphonic acid. It is a useful reagent for peptide synthesis reactions, where it activates the carboxylic acid partner for subsequent reaction with a primary or secondary amine. It is commercially available as 50% solution in DMF or ethyl acetate as a slightly yellow mixture.

Examples of Propanephosphonic acid anhydride being used in the industrial syntheses of pharmaceuticals include the Pfizer synthesis of dacomitinib, the Neurosearch synthesis of SNDRIs such as PC44156003, the last step of the synthesis of selinexor, and the synthesis of darolutamide.
