= Puerto Rican Tests of Academic Achievement =

Tests for public school students in Puerto Rico

The Puerto Rican Tests of Academic Achievement —Spanish: Pruebas Puertorriqueñas de Aprovechamiento Académico (PPAA)— are a set of standardized achievement tests provided by the Department of Education of Puerto Rico that evaluate the academic achievement of students in Puerto Rico. The tests cover the subjects of English language, mathematics, Spanish language, and science. The tests are aligned with the content standards of excellence established in 2000 by the Department of Education of Puerto Rico and meet the requirements of the No Child Left Behind Act.

Historically, public school students tend to perform poorly in the tests, with thirty-nine percent (39%) of public school students performing at a basic level (average performance) in Spanish. Likewise, 36% perform at a basic level in Mathematics while 35% perform at a basic level in English and 43% at a basic level in Science. Until 2008, the students that exceeded the 95 percentile could receive a monetary reward as a check, if their family received government assistance. After 2008 this was changed.
