= Secretary of Education of Puerto Rico =

Government of Puerto Rico

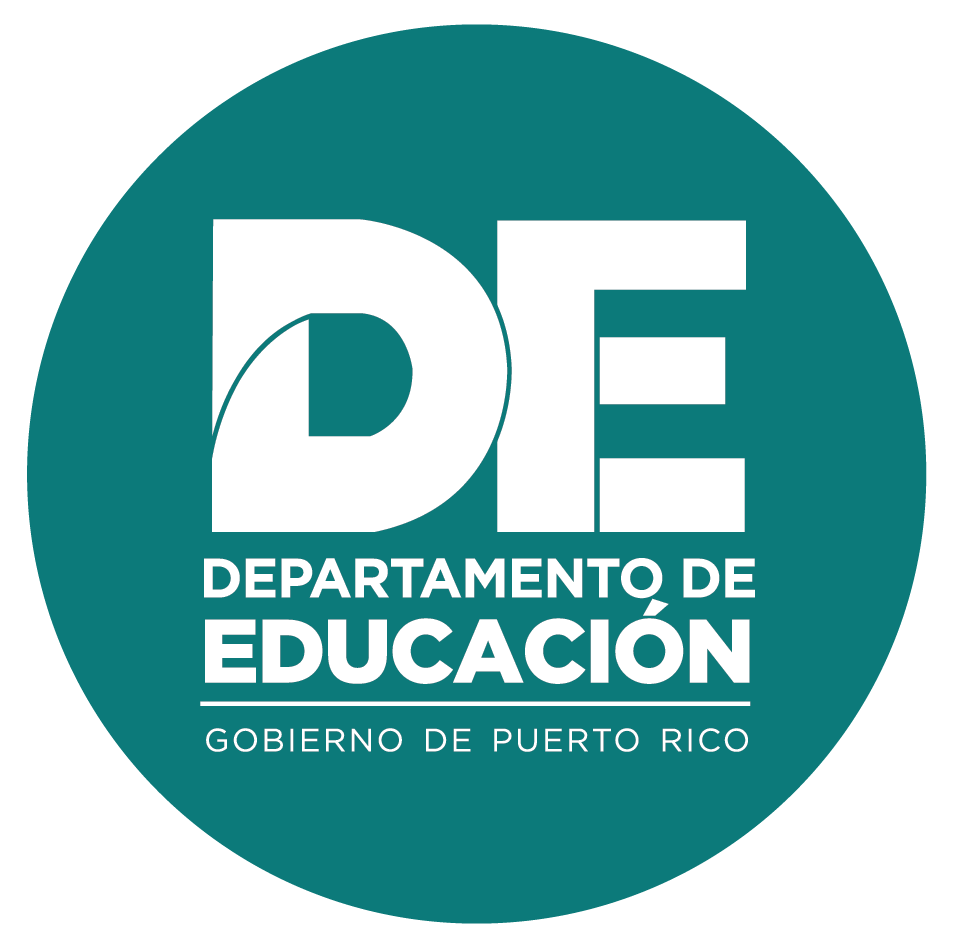
- Official Logo of the Department
- Incumbent; Eliezer Ramos Parés since January 2, 2025; 20 months ago
- Department of Education
- Nominator: Governor
- Appointer: Governor with advice and consent from the Senate
- Term length: 4 years
- Formation: Established by Article IV of the Constitution of Puerto Rico
- Succession: Fourth
- Salary: $80,000 USD
- Website: www.de.gobierno.pr

The secretary of education of Puerto Rico is responsible for the development and management of all educational matters in the government of Puerto Rico and heads the Department of Education.

There have been three types of secretaries in the history of Puerto Rico. The first were the education commissioners established in 1899 after Puerto Rico was succeeded to the United States from Spain. The second were the secretaries of public instruction after the predecessor of the Department of Education —the Department of Public Instruction— was formally established by law. Today Puerto Rico has secretaries of education after the Department of Public Instruction was reorganized and renamed as the Department of Education.

== List of former and current secretaries ==
=== Education commissioners ===
#	Portrait	Name	Term start	Term end	Political party	Appointed by
1		Martin G. Brumbaugh	1900	1902	Republican	William McKinley
2		Samuel McCune Lindsay	1902	1904	Republican	Theodore Roosevelt
3		Ronald R. Falkner	1904	1907	Republican	Theodore Roosevelt
4		Edwin G. Dexter	1907	1912	Republican	William Howard Taft
5		Edward M. Bainter	1912	1915	Democratic	Woodrow Wilson
6		Paul G. Miller	1915	1921	Democratic	Woodrow Wilson
7		Juan B. Huyke	1921	1929	Republican	Warren G. Harding
8		José Padín	1930	1936	Republican	Herbert Hoover
9		H. A. Martin	1937	1937	Democratic	Franklin D. Roosevelt
10		José M. Gallardo	1937	1945	Democratic	Franklin D. Roosevelt
11		Mariano Villaronga Toro	1946	1947	Democratic	Harry S. Truman
12		Francisco Collazo	1947	1948	Democratic	Harry S. Truman

=== Secretaries of public instruction ===
PPD PNP
#	Portrait	Name	Term start	Term end	Political party	Appointed by	Affiliation
1		Mariano Villaronga Toro	1949	1957	PPD	Luis Muñoz Marín	Democratic
2		Efraín Sánchez Hidalgo	1957	1960	PPD	Luis Muñoz Marín	Democratic
3		Cándido Oliveras	1960	1964	PPD	Luis Muñoz Marín	Democratic
4		Ángel Quintero Alfaro	1965	1968	PPD	Roberto Sanchez Vilella	Democratic
5		Ramón Mellado Parsons	1969	1971	PNP	Luis A. Ferre	Republican
6		Tania Viera	1972	1972	PNP	Luis A. Ferre	Republican
7		Celeste Benítez	1973	1973	PPD	Rafael Hernandez Colon	Democratic
8		Ramón A. Cruz Aponte	1973	1976	PPD	Rafael Hernandez Colon	Democratic
9		Herman Sulsona	1977	1977	PNP	Carlos Romero Barcelo	Democratic
10		Carlos A. Chardón	1977	1980	PNP	Carlos Romero Barcelo	Democratic
11		María Socorro Lacott	1980	1984	PNP	Carlos Romero Barcelo	Democratic
12		Awilda Aponte Roque	1985	1988	PPD	Rafael Hernandez Colon	Democratic
13		Rafael Cartagena	1989	1989	PPD	Rafael Hernandez Colon	Democratic

=== Secretaries of education ===
PDP NPP

#	Portrait	Name	Term start	Term end	Political party
1		José Lema Moya	1989	1991	PPD
2		Celeste Benítez Rivera	1991	1992	PPD
3		Annabelle Padilla Rodríguez	1993	1993	PNP
4		José Arsenio Torres	1993	1994	PNP
5		Víctor Fajardo	1994	2000	PNP
6		César Rey Hernández	2001	2004	PPD
7		Rafael Aragunde Torres	2005	2008	PPD
8		Carlos A. Chardón	2009	2009	PNP
9		Odette Piñeiro Caballero	2009	2010	PNP
10		Jesús Rivera Sánchez	2010	2011	PNP
11		Edward Moreno	2011	2012	PNP
12		Rafael Román Meléndez	2013	2017	PPD
13		Julia Keleher	2017	2019	PNP
14		Eligio Hernandez Perez	2019	2020	PNP
15		Elba Aponte Santos	2021	2021	PNP
16		Magaly Rivera Rivera	2021	2021	PNP
17		Eliezer Ramos Parés	2021	2023	PNP
18		Yanira Raíces Vega	2023	2025	PNP
19		Eliezer Ramos Parés	2025	current	PNP
