= Carlos Chardón =

Carlos Chardón may refer to:

- Carlos A. Chardón López (born 1939), Secretary of the Puerto Rico Department of Education
- Carlos E. Chardón (1897–1965), Puerto Rican mycologist and Chancellor of the University of Puerto Rico
- Carlos Fernando Chardón (1907–1981), served as the Puerto Rico Adjutant General 1973–1975 and as Secretary of State of Puerto Rico 1969–1973
