= Puerto Rico Department of Education =

Agency of the executive branch of the government of Puerto Rico

- Departamento de Educación de Puerto Rico
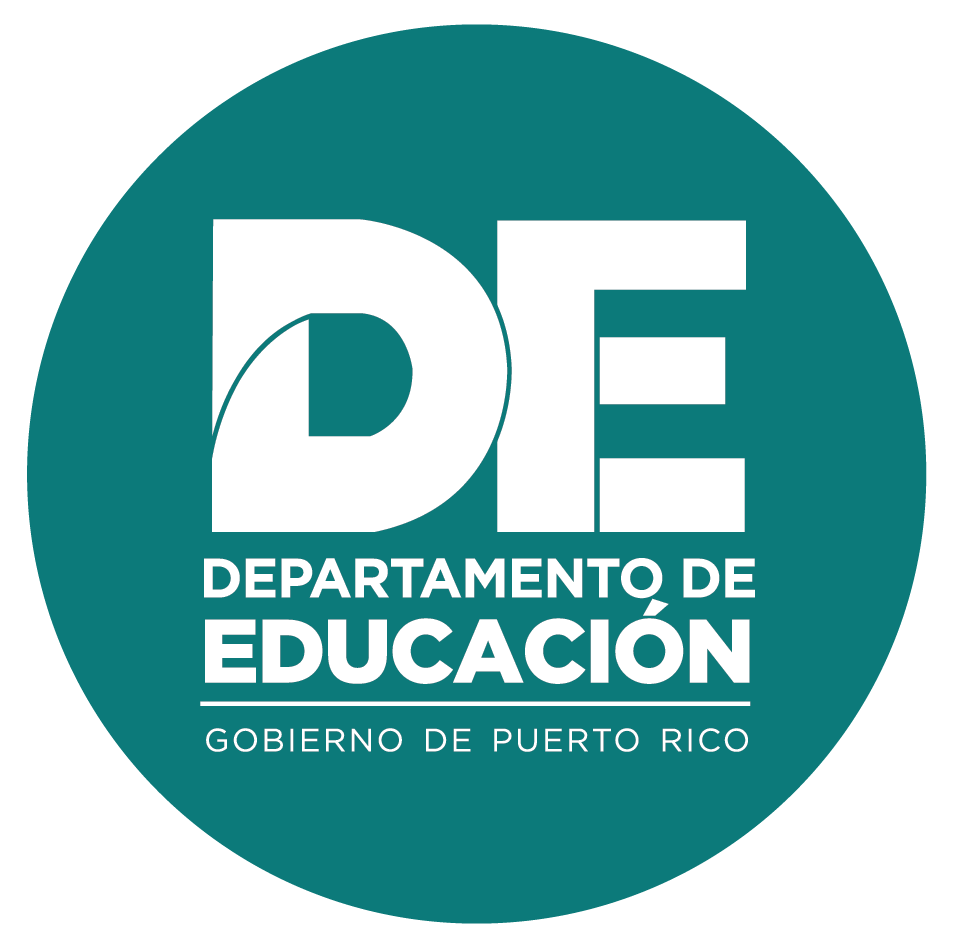

Agency overview
- Formed: April 12, 1900; 126 years ago
- Preceding agency: Department of Public Instruction of Puerto Rico
- Type: Executive department
- Jurisdiction: Commonwealth of Puerto Rico
- Headquarters: San Juan, PR
- Employees: 75,000
- Annual budget: $3.5 billion USD
- Agency executive: Yanira Raíces Vega, Secretary
- Key documents: Foraker Act; Law No. 149 of 1999; Article IV of the Constitution of Puerto Rico
- Website: www.de.pr.gov

The Puerto Rico Department of Education (PRDOE; Spanish: Departamento de Educación de Puerto Rico) is one of five jurisdiction-wide public education systems in the United States, with Hawaii, Guam, Northern Mariana Islands, and American Samoa being the others. The PRDOE is the state education agency in charge of managing public schools in Puerto Rico as well as the island's education system and curricula. The department, headquartered in Hato Rey, San Juan, is the result of a United States state department of education. It is also the largest agency of the executive branch of Puerto Rico, with, as of 2019, an annual budget of more than $3.5 billion USD and over 72,000 staff—including more than 41,000 teachers, and as of 2020 the department is the third-largest school district in the United States by enrollment, with over 276,413 students and 857 schools.

The department was formerly known as the Department of Public Instruction of Puerto Rico. Under local law, all public schools are required to be licensed by the Puerto Rico Education Council.

== History ==
The department was established under section 6 of Article IV of the Constitution of Puerto Rico on 25 July 1952.

In 1950, there were 74 districts, each managed by a superintendent. Juan Bernardo Huyke who was the superintendent of the Bayamón district in 1950, and also served as the Secretary of Education of Puerto Rico; he wrote a number of books and was a strong proponent of bilingual education for the island public school students.

In 2012 governor Luis Fortuño inaugurated the first school under the "21st century" program intended to modernize the island's schools. Critics signalled that community input was not taken into account when modernizing schools. In total 100 schools were remodeled under the program which used ARRA funds.

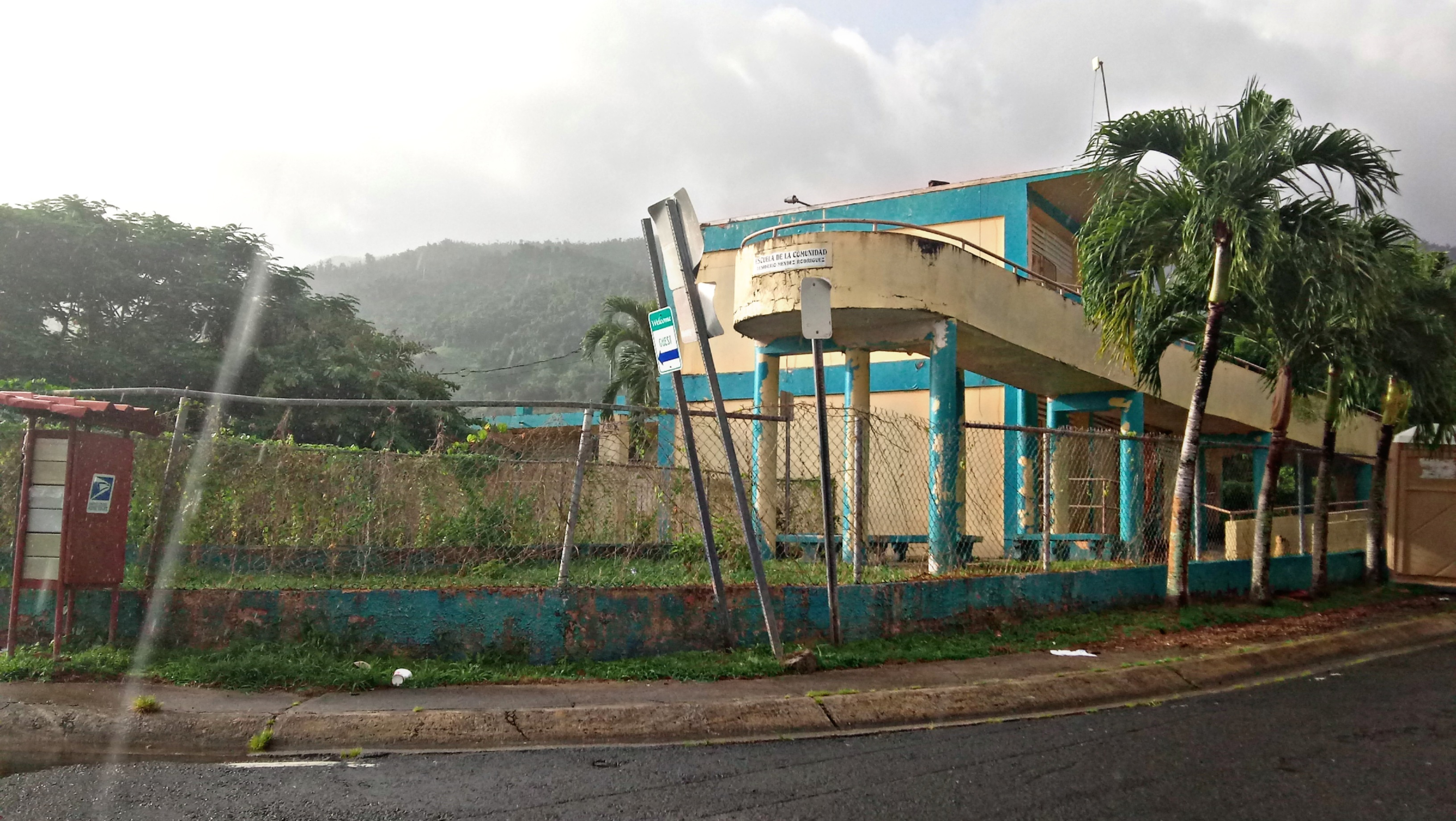
A public school in Naguabo, Puerto Rico in 2020

In 2016 PROMESA gave the Financial Oversight and Management Board for Puerto Rico control over the island's finances including the department. The board has ordered cuts to education on various occasions including for special needs education, which faces a cut of $95 million in 2021.

In 2017, Julia Keleher became the department's secretary. That year, due to the Puerto Rican government-debt crisis, the department announced that 187 schools would close. That number was revised to 179 shortly afterward. Receiving no maintenance once shuttered, the school buildings caused blight in many communities that subsequently hoped to use the school buildings and premises for other purposes. In Lares, it was decided that unused public schools, including one in Piletas Arce (on Puerto Rico Highway 129), would be transformed for use by the agricultural industry of Lares.

The island's economic crisis along with the resulting population loss has caused a decline in the student population. In 2020 the department had 16,105 students, representing a decline of 5.5% from the year before.

The department also has seen a lack of personnel, including teachers and directors. Most years, the agency has needed hundreds more staff: 500 in 2013, 300 in 2019, and 457 in 2021. In 2018 the American Federation of Teachers president Randy Weingarten indicated the beginning of the school year was "plagued by chaos and lack of planning". The staff shortages have resulted in many schools delaying the first week of class.

In September 2020, the Trump administration approved $13 billion, through FEMA, to Puerto Rico destined to rebuild the electrical infrastructure and education system. The department continues to struggle fiscally in 2021. Interim secretary Eliezer Ramos Parés informed the agency had witnessed cuts of $749 million from both state and local sources and as a result lacked $58 million needed for wages.

The 2019–20 Puerto Rico earthquakes resulted in various schools being damaged or shuttered. Delays in receiving funds for repairs hampered efforts to resume classes.

=== COVID-19 Pandemic ===
In 2021 the department announced summer classes to help 37,000 students which are at risk of not passing to the next grade, in part due to problems related to online learning as a result of the COVID-19 pandemic. This represented at least 20% of the student population at risk of failing. During the 2021 spring semester, governor Pedro Pierluisi attempted to reopen schools which had been shuttered due to the pandemic, but these plans were delayed. The school reopening process demonstrated some schools lacked teachers, psychologist and custodians. Eligible students were required to be vaccinated nonetheless, days before the beginning of the semester the department did not have knowledge of how many had received their COVID-19 shots. For the August 2021 semester, the department ordered air purifiers, but the purchase was halted by the Financial Oversight and Management Board due to a lack of a competitive process. The contractor for the air purifiers had been involved in another controversial contract related to providing students with tutoring.

In March 2021, as part of Governor Pedro Pierluisi's executive order on gender based violence, the department incorporated gender studies into the curriculum for 2022.

In May 2025, the Puerto Rico House of Representatives approved a bill directing the Department of Education to design and integrate history courses, including U.S. history, into the general curriculum of vocational schools in Puerto Rico.

== Organization ==
=== UnEE ===
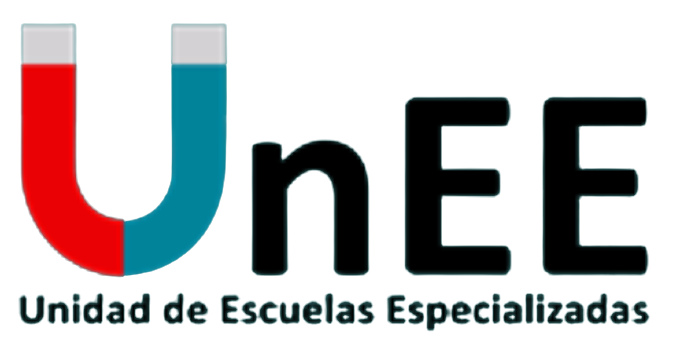
The Specialized Schools Unit's logo, the Department of Education's magnet school division.

The agency divides itself into areas, including the area of Projects Educational Transformation, which includes the island's Specialized Schools Unit (UnEE, for its initials in Spanish). These schools are Magnet schools which specialize in certain materials and have higher requirements for admission than other public schools. Many well recognized schools such as CROEM and University Gardens High School are UnEE schools.

=== Montessori Schools ===
The department has an autonomous program run by the Auxiliary Secretariat of Montessori Education (SAEM, for its initials in Spanish). As of 2021, 47 schools with 13,500 students have implemented this style of teaching. The Instituto Nueva Escuela, the only institution accredited by the American Montessori Society on the island, has an alliance with the program to help create educational material.

== School uniforms ==
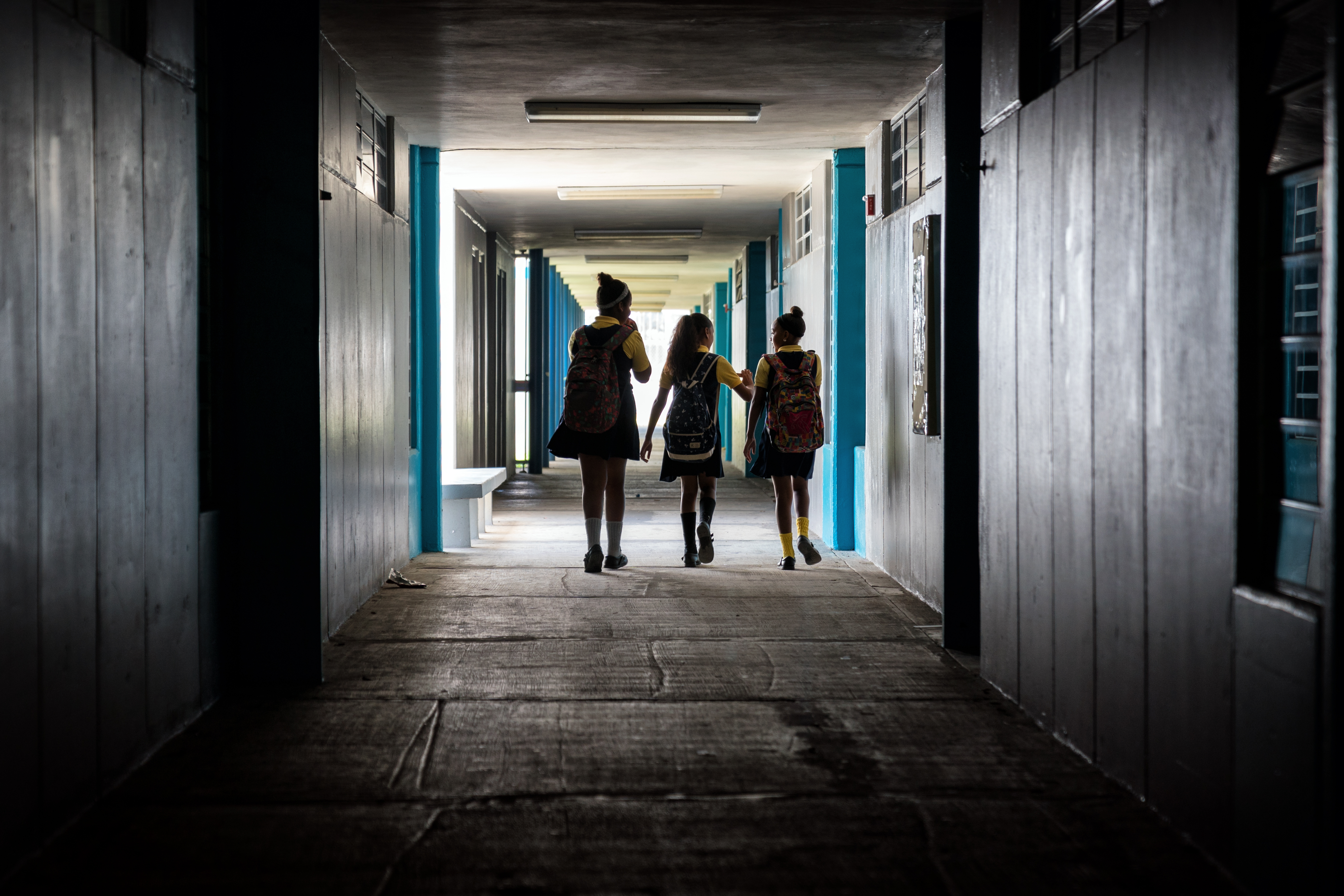
Three students at the Belen Blanco de Zequeira School in Loíza

The department formerly required all students to wear school uniforms and only disallowed them for medical exemptions. In 2020 the department indicated any single colored t-shirt, polo or button shirt is acceptable. Public schools are prohibited from requiring a specific school uniform and as a result the purchase of school clothing is open to the free market. These changes would be implemented from the 2021–2022 academic year.

== Secretaries ==
The Department of education's secretary is nominated by the governor of Puerto Rico and confirmed by the Senate.

- 1900–1902: Martin G. Brumbaugh
- 1902–1904: Samuel McCune Lindsay
- 1904–1907: Ronald R. Falkner
- 1907–1912: Edwin G. Dexter
- 1912–1915: Edward M. Bainter
- 1915–1921: Paul G. Miller
- 1921–1929: Juan B. Huyke
- 1930–1936: José Padín
- 1937–1937: H. A. Martin
- 1937–1945: José M. Gallardo
- 1946–1947: Mariano Villaronga Toro
- 1947–1948: Francisco Collazo
- 1949–1957: Mariano Villaronga Toro
- 1957–1960: Efraín Sánchez Hidalgo
- 1960–1964: Cándido Oliveras
- 1965–1968: Ángel Quintero Alfaro
- 1969–1971: Ramón Mellado Parsons
- 1972–1972: Tania Viera
- 1973–1973: Celeste Benítez Rivera
- 1973–1976: Ramón A. Cruz Aponte
- 1977–1977: Herman Sulsona
- 1977–1980: Carlos A. Chardón López
- 1980–1984: María Socorro Lacot
- 1985–1988: Awilda Aponte Roque
- 1989–1989: Rafael Cartagena
- 1989–1991: José Lema Moya
- 1991–1992: Celeste Benítez Rivera
- 1993–1993: Annabelle Padilla Rodríguez
- 1993–1994: José Arsenio Torres
- 1994–2000: Víctor Fajardo
- 2001–2004: César Rey Hernández
- 2005–2005: Adalexis Ríos Orlandi
- 2005–2005: Gloria Baquero Lleras
- 2005–2008: Rafael Aragunde Torres
- 2009–2009: Carlos A. Chardón López
- 2009–2010: Odette Piñeiro Caballero
- 2010–2011: Jesús Rivera Sánchez
- 2011–2013: Edward Moreno
- 2013–2017: Rafael Román Meléndez
- 2017–2019: Julia Keleher
- 2019–2021: Eligio Hernández Pérez
- 2021–2021: Elba Aponte
- 2021–2021: Magali Rivera
- 2021–2021: Eliezer Ramos Parés
