= Tania Viera Martínez =

Puerto Rican educator and lawyer

Director of the Puerto Rico Automobile Accident Compensation Administration
- In office 1977–1984
- Governor: Carlos Romero Barceló

Secretary of Education of Puerto Rico
- In office 1972–1972
- Governor: Luis A. Ferré
- Preceded by: Ramón Mellado Parsons
- Succeeded by: Celeste Benítez Rivera

Personal details
- Born: March 27, 1922 Gurabo, Puerto Rico
- Died: January 5, 2007 (aged 84) San Juan, Puerto Rico
- Children: 2
- Education: University of Puerto Rico (BA); New York University (M.Ed.); Interamerican University of Puerto Rico School of Law (JD)
- Occupation: Educator, lawyer

Tania Viera Martínez (March 27, 1922 – January 5, 2007) was a Puerto Rican educator and lawyer who served as the executive director of the Puerto Rico Automobile Accident Compensation Administration from 1977 to 1984. In 1972, she became the first woman Secretary of Education of Puerto Rico. Viera Martínez later served as the rector of San Juan Community College.

== Early life and education ==
Tania Viera Martínez was born in Gurabo, Puerto Rico on March 27 to Alejandrina Martínez and Nieves Viera. She had 9 siblings. Viera Martínez graduated with honors from Central High School. She attended the University of Puerto Rico in the faculty of education.

Viera Martínez later completed a M.A. in higher education and student affairs at the New York University Steinhardt School of Culture, Education, and Human Development. She took night classes, part-time, at the Interamerican University of Puerto Rico School of Law, completing a Juris Doctor in 1969.

== Career ==
Viera Martínez worked as a schoolteacher in the rural regions of Gurabo. She returned to San Juan in the 1950s and 1960s where she worked as a professor, high school principal, and superintendent in the Puerto Rico Department of Education (DEPR).

After completing her master's degree, Viera Martínez became the director of the editorial division at the DEPR. She was the advisor to the Secretary of Education of Puerto Rico and served as the undersecretary for Ramón Mellado Parsons. She was named by Governor Luis A. Ferré as Secretary of Education in 1972. She was the first woman to hold the position in Puerto Rico.

In 1973, the San Juan Mayor, Carlos Romero Barceló, named her the municipality's director of students where she oversaw the city's Head Start program. Viera Martínez later became the rector of the San Juan Community College.

In 1977, Viera Martínez was named executive director of the Puerto Rico Automobile Accident Compensation Administration by Governor Romero Barceló. She served in this role until 1984.

== Personal life ==
Tania Viera Martínez married Raúl Torres González, a lawyer, in 1945. She also went by the married name Tania Viera de Torres. They had a daughter and son.
