= Luis Fortuño =

Puerto Rican politician

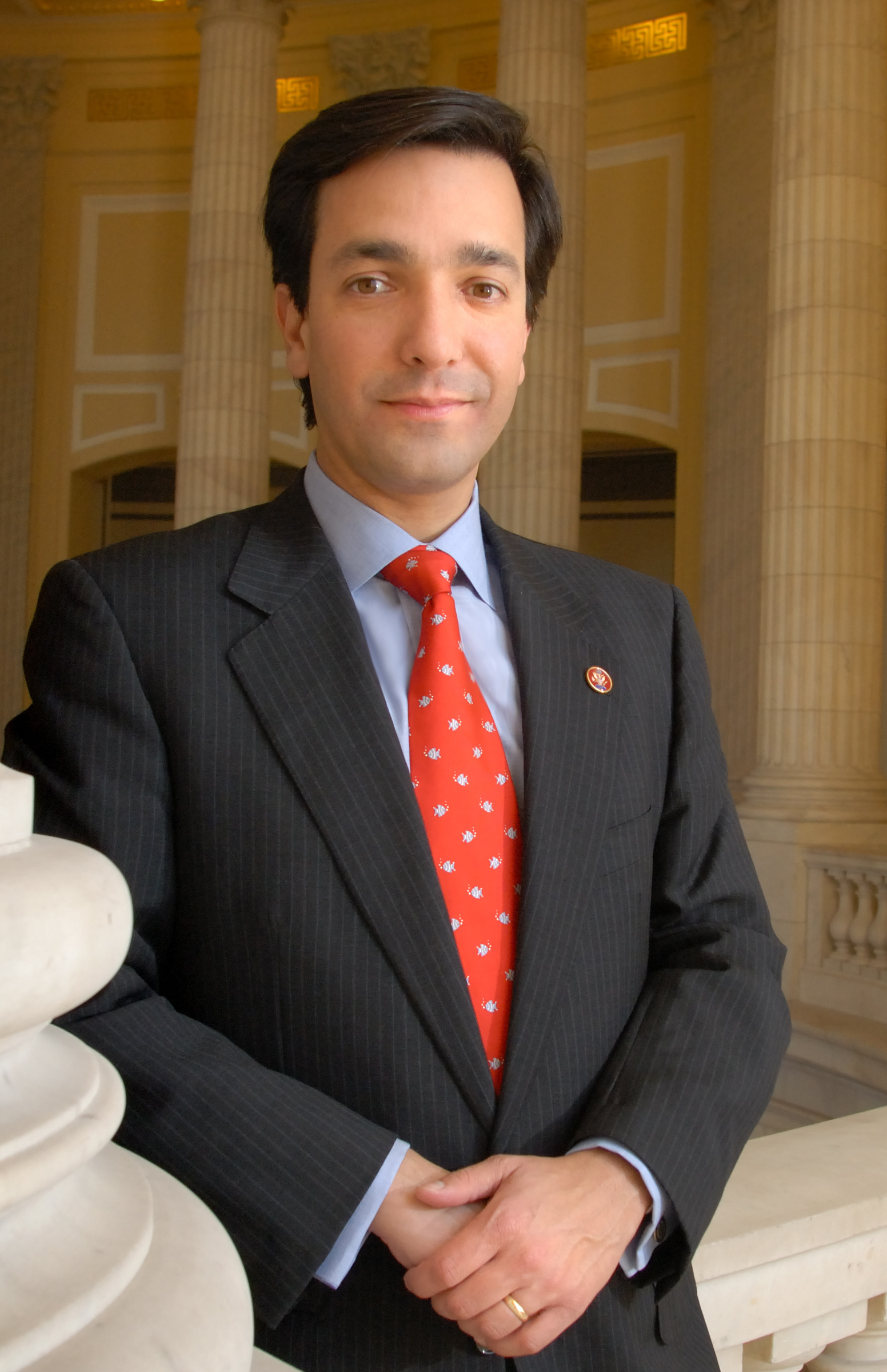
- Fortuño in c. 2009

Shadow Member of the U.S. House of Representatives from Puerto Rico
- In office 15 August 2017 – 1 July 2021
- Preceded by: Seat established
- Succeeded by: Elizabeth Torres

Governor of Puerto Rico
- In office 2 January 2009 – 2 January 2013
- Preceded by: Aníbal Acevedo Vilá
- Succeeded by: Alejandro García Padilla

18th Resident Commissioner of Puerto Rico
- In office 3 January 2005 – 2 January 2009
- Preceded by: Aníbal Acevedo Vilá
- Succeeded by: Pedro Pierluisi

Personal details
- Born: Luis Guillermo Fortuño Burset; 31 October 1960 (age 65) San Juan, Puerto Rico
- Party: New Progressive
- Other political affiliations: Republican
- Children: 3
- Education: Georgetown University (BS); University of Virginia (JD)

Luis Guillermo Fortuño Burset (born 31 October 1960) is a Puerto Rican politician who served as the governor of Puerto Rico, an unincorporated territory of the United States, from 2009 to 2013.

Fortuño served as the first secretary of economic development and commerce of Puerto Rico (1994–1997), as the executive director of the Puerto Rico Tourism Company (1993–1994), and as the president of the Puerto Rico Hotel Development Corporation during the administration of Pedro Rosselló. In 2004, Fortuño was elected resident commissioner of Puerto Rico, defeating Senator Roberto Prats. As resident commissioner, Fortuño represented Puerto Rico in the United States House of Representatives from 2005 to 2009; during his tenure, he served as Chair of the Congressional Hispanic Conference, as a Member of the newly created United States House Natural Resources Subcommittee on Insular Affairs and as co-chair of the Friends of Spain Caucus.

Fortuño won the 2008 PNP gubernatorial nomination by a wide margin after defeating former governor and then-senator Pedro Rosselló in the primaries. He then won the general election by a comfortable margin, defeating incumbent governor Aníbal Acevedo Vilá. Fortuño has served as president of the New Progressive Party of Puerto Rico (PNP), the Council of State Governments, and the Southern Governors Association. Fortuño sought to be re-elected as governor in the 2012 elections, but was defeated by Alejandro García Padilla by 0.6%.

== Early life and family ==
Fortuño was born in San Juan, Puerto Rico, the son of Luis Fortuño Moscoso, a dentist, and Shirley Burset. He is the eldest of four brothers. Fortuño is of paternal Spanish descent including Catalan and Galician, his great-great grandfather Jaime José Fortuño y Ferrús was from Tarragona. Fortuño also has Corsican lineage from his maternal great-grandfather.

== Education ==
Fortuño attended Colegio Marista (Marist School) in Guaynabo, graduating in 1978. He then earned a Bachelor of Science degree in diplomacy from the Edmund A. Walsh School of Foreign Service at Georgetown University. In 1985, he received his Juris Doctor degree from the University of Virginia School of Law. During this period, Fortuño was an intern at the Puerto Rico Federal Affairs Administration in Washington, D.C.

While in college, Luis Fortuño co-founded the Puerto Rico Statehood Students Association (PRSSA) with Kenneth McClintock and presided over the organization from 1980 to 1981. During the 1980 gubernatorial election recount, PRSSA generated more than 1,500 absentee ballots at Fortuño's direction for incumbent Governor Carlos Romero Barceló. The generated ballots were an important factor in Romero Barceló's reelection; he won by a slim margin of approximately 3000 votes. Fortuño was also active in other pro-statehood youth organizations and in the Republican Party.

== Early career ==
Fortuño entered public service in 1993 at the start of Governor Pedro Rosselló's administration. He was first appointed executive director of the Puerto Rico Tourism Company and president of Puerto Rico's Hotel Development Corporation (HDC). In 1994, he became Puerto Rico's first secretary of the Puerto Rico Department of Economic Development and Commerce. Fortuño was tasked with the development and implementation of large-scale changes of Puerto Rico's tax, labor, corporate and commercial codes.

Fortuño was named 1996 Man of the Year by Caribbean Business, 1995 Public Servant of the Year by the Marketing Industry and Distribution of Food and Beverage Products Association of Puerto Rico, 1994 Public Servant of the Year by the Puerto Rico Chamber of Commerce, and 1994 Distinguished Executive by the Sales and Marketing Executives Association of Ponce and the Southern Region of Puerto Rico. He served on numerous boards of directors, including the Ana G. Méndez University System and the Puerto Rico Museum of Art. He is a member of the American Law Institute and the Urban Land Institute. In 1996, he served on the Platform Committee at the Republican National Convention, where he was successful in including the support for self-determination and eventual statehood for Puerto Rico in the party platform. Fortuño resigned his cabinet posts after Rosselló's reelection in 1996 and returned to private law practice.

Fortuño was a partner at the San Juan law firm of Correa, Collazo, Herrero, Jiménez & Fortuño, specializing in corporate finance and real estate law. Prior to joining Correa, Collazo, Herrero, Jiménez & Fortuño, he was a partner at McConnell Valdés LLC.

In 2001, Fortuño was elected as Republican National Committeeman for Puerto Rico, a position which he still holds as of May 2026.

== Resident commissioner of Puerto Rico: 2005-2009 ==
=== 2004 campaign ===
Fortuño decided to seek the New Progressive Party's nomination for the post of resident commissioner of Puerto Rico late in the primary season. He won the November 2003 primaries with 61.28% of votes and defeated former senator Miriam Ramirez de Ferrer (4.26% of votes), former Senate President Charlie Rodriguez (6.29% of votes), and former governor and resident commissioner Carlos Romero Barceló (25.78% of votes). After winning the primary, he picked up momentum within the Republican Party ranks in the U.S. when he received the endorsement of Ed Gillespie, head of the Republican National Committee. Fortuño was the running mate of former governor Rosselló, who returned for a third bid as the PNP's candidate for governor.

In the elections of 2004, Fortuño was victorious (48.5% of votes) over his main rival candidate Roberto Prats (48% of votes) of the Popular Democratic Party (PDP). Fortuño's running mate, Pedro Rosselló, lost his bid for the governor's seat to then resident commissioner Aníbal Acevedo Vilá by less than 4,000 votes. This meant that Fortuño would be the resident commissioner under Governor Acevedo Vilá of the PDP. This was the first time in Puerto Rican history that the governor of Puerto Rico and the resident commissioner were not from the same political party. Fortuño became the first resident commissioner to caucus with the GOP since Puerto Rico gained commonwealth status; the three previous PNP resident commissioners had originally aligned themselves with the Democrats.

=== Tenure ===
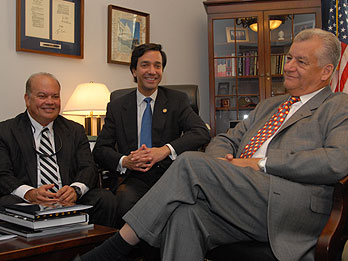
Luis Fortuño meets with mayors from across the island of Puerto Rico in his congressional office (2006).

Upon the commencement of the 109th Congress, Fortuño was elected by his colleagues to serve as vice-president of the House Republican freshman class. He served as vice-chair of the Congressional Hispanic Conference during the 109th Congress and as chair during the 110th Congress. Fortuño was co-chair of the Congressional Friends of Spain, part of the Hispanic Conference Caucus. House Resources Committee Ranking Member Don Young appointed him in January 2007 as the Republican minority's ranking member in the Subcommittee on Insular Affairs for the 110th Congress. Fortuño cosponsored the Puerto Rico Democracy Act of 2007, which would give Puerto Ricans the option to become a US state or sovereign state. In October, 2007, Fortuño filed legislation, along with Representative Dana Rohrabacher (R-CA) to assure the continued operation of the Arecibo Radiotelescope.

Fortuño was re-elected by the Republican Party of Puerto Rico's General Assembly to continue serving as National Committeeman, a position he has held since 2001. He won reelection as National Committeeman in the GOP convention held on 20 May 2007 in Yauco, Puerto Rico.

In 2007, Fortuño joined Representative José Serrano (D-NY) and 128 other co-sponsors in filing HR 900, the Puerto Rico Democracy Act, to establish a self-determination process leading to political status change for Puerto Rico. The bill was amended and approved in a voice vote by the House's Committee on Resources on 23 October, a major victory for Fortuño. However, as other political status bills in the past, the measure never made it to the President for his signature.

== Governor of Puerto Rico: 2009-2013 ==
=== 2008 election ===
A poll taken before Fortuño Burset announced his gubernatorial bid in February 2007 suggests he is the most well-liked public figure in the PNP. The poll, taken by Gaither International at the request of Caribbean Business newspaper, indicated that Governor Aníbal Acevedo Vilá, Fortuño's likely opponent, would fare badly in the general election. Another poll released in May 2007 and taken by Kaagan Research Associates, Inc. at the request of El Nuevo Día, a major circulation newspaper, showed Fortuño with a 46% to 25% advantage over incumbent Governor Acevedo Vilá. On 16 May 2007 poll also showed Fortuño winning a primary election against Pedro Rosselló 49% to 37%.

On 19 February 2007, Fortuño announced his candidacy for Governor of Puerto Rico for the 2008 general election. He faced former 2004 running mate and former governor Pedro Juan Rosselló González in an PNP primary on 9 March 2008 which he won by a 60% to 40% margin.

On 18 May 2007 Fortuño announced that former attorney general Pedro Pierluisi Urrutia would be his running mate and run for Fortuño's current office of resident commissioner of Puerto Rico. Pierluisi Urrutia was a classmate at Colegio Marista, a fellow member of the Puerto Rico Statehood Students Association and also a fellow cabinet member of Fortuño's during former governor Rosselló's first term from 1993 to 1996.

On 9 March 2008, Fortuño easily defeated Rosselló at the PNP primaries and became the new president of the PNP and its official candidate for governor. Fortuño won the candidacy by obtaining nearly 60% of primary votes. Fortuño's running mate and now official candidate for resident commissioner, Pedro Pierluisi, also won his primary.

On 4 November 2008, Fortuño became the ninth governor-elect of Puerto Rico by popular election winning by over 220,000 votes, the largest victory margin in 44 years and giving the New Progressive Party its largest victory in history. Also he became the second governor to get more than a million votes, after Pedro Rosselló's reelection in 1996. Accompanied with his victory, the party gained control of the legislature by historic margins and the majority of mayoralties, and with it the power to name 3 Supreme Court judges that for the first time in history would give PNP appointees a majority on the Supreme Court of Puerto Rico. With this win, Fortuño would have the opportunity to name various fixed-term posts, including the comptroller, the ombudsman and the director of the Government Ethics Office.

The Fortuño Cabinet
OFFICE	NAME	TERM
Governor	Luis G. Fortuño	2009–2013
Secretary of State	Kenneth McClintock	2009–2013
Justice	Antonio Sagardía	2009
	Guillermo Somoza	2010–2013
Treasury	Juan Carlos Puig	2009–2011
	Jesús F. Méndez	2011–2012
	Harry Márquez	2012-2013
Education	Carlos A. Chardón	2009
	Odette Piñeiro	2009–2010
	Jesús Rivera Sánchez	2010–2011
	Edward Moreno	2011–2013
Labor	Miguel Romero	2009–2012
	Elvira M. Cancio (Acting)	15 August 2012 – 2 January 2013
Transportation	Rubén Hernández Gregorat	2009–2013
Economic Development	José Ramón Perez-Riera	2009–2013
Health	Jaime Rivera Dueño	2009
	Iván González Cancel	2009
	Lorenzo González	2009–2013
Agriculture	Javier Rivera Aquino	2009–2012
	Neftalí Soto	2012–2013
Family	Miguel Maldonado	2009
	Yanitzia Irizarry	2009–2013
Corrections	Carlos Molina	2009–2011
	Jesús González	2011–2013
Consumer Affairs	Luis G. Rivera Marín	2009–2012
	Omar Marrero	2012-2013
Housing	Yesef Cordero	2009–2010
	Miguel Hernández-Vivoni	2010–2013
Natural Resources	Daniel Galán Kercadó	2009–2013
Sports and Recreation	Henry Neumann	2009–2013
Chief of Staff	Juan Carlos Blanco	2009
	Marcos Rodríguez Ema	2009–31 August 2012
	Miguel Romero	1 Sept. 2012 – 2 Jan. 2013
OMB	María Sánchez Bras	2009–2011
	Juan Carlos Pavía-Vidal	2011–2013
President of the Government Development Bank of Puerto Rico	Carlos M. García	2009–2011
	Juan Carlos Batlle	2011–2013
Inspector General	Juan Carlos Puig	2011
	Ricardo Dalmau	2011–2013
Police	José Figueroa Sancha	2009–2011
	Emilio Díaz Colón	2011–2012
	Héctor Pesquera	2012
Associate Justices	Rafael Martínez Torres	2009–2013
	Mildred Pabón Charneco	2009–2013
	Erick Kolthoff	2009–2013
	Edgardo Rivera	2010–2013
	Roberto Feliberti	2011–2013
	Luis Estrella Martínez	2011–2013
Comptroller	Yesmín Valdivieso	2010–2020
Ethics Director	Zulma Rosario	2009–2019
Ombudsman	Iris Miriam Ruíz	2010–2020
Electoral Comptroller	Manuel A. Torres	2012-2022
Administración Desarrollo Laboral	Aurelio Gonzalez Cubero	2009-2012

Immediately after 4 November 2008 general election, Governor-Elect Fortuño began the formation of an emerging administration. On 7 November, Fortuño held a caucus of incoming PNP legislators, who chose Thomas Rivera Schatz as the incoming Senate president in an uncontested election and Representative Jenniffer González as the new House speaker, succeeding the incumbent House speaker, who also competed. On 9 November, he announced the appointment of outgoing Senate president Kenneth McClintock as the head of the Incoming Committee on Government Transition. On 11 November, he began announcing the members of his Cabinet and other administration officials, beginning with McClintock's appointment as secretary of state, equivalent to a lieutenant governor.

=== Inauguration ===
Fortuño's oath of office was administered in the late afternoon of 2 January 2009, at a ceremony attended by five of the U.S. territory's six living governors, Fortuño, Aníbal Acevedo Vilá, Sila María Calderón, Carlos Romero Barceló and Rafael Hernández Colón. Only former governor Rosselló, who did not publicly endorse him, was absent.

Following tradition, the inaugural event was initially led by the outgoing secretary of state Fernando Bonilla and then by incoming secretary of state Kenneth McClintock. Among the thousands of attendees of the event were singer Marc Anthony and his then wife, actress and singer Jennifer Lopez, White House Director of Intergovernmental Affairs Janet Creighton and the head of Intergovernmental Affairs for President-elect Barack Obama's transition team, Nick Rathod. Foreign dignitaries included Dominican Republic president Leonel Fernández and the president of Dominica, Nicholas Liverpool. Following his inaugural address, Fortuño walked from the Capitol to La Fortaleza. In the evening, a free concert in Old San Juan and a state dinner hosted by the new Secretary of State were held.

=== Administration, Cabinet, and Supreme Court appointments ===
Of these, Secretary of State McClintock, Fortuño's first Attorney General, Sagardía, Police Superintendent José Figueroa Sancha and Corrections Secretary Molina were the first to have been confirmed and formally sworn in.

At the end of his four-year term, Fortuño had retained 5 of the 14 members of his original constitutional cabinet, the secretaries of state, transportation, economic development and commerce, natural resources, and sports and recreation.

=== Notable events ===
==== Healthcare ====
Mitt Romney stated that he would repeal what he refers to as "Obamacare," on "my first day if elected president of the United States." Luis Fortuño's position on President Obama's initiative was to side with his Republican counterparts. On 24 February 2010, he stated in an interview with the local press that "Obama's proposal would have unfortunate results for Puerto Rico."

A year later, Fortuño joined with other Republican governors, signing a letter that asked for the "full repeal of the Affordable Care Act."

==== Economic crisis ====
In a televised speech on 3 March 2009, 60 days after having been sworn in, Governor Fortuño announced his fiscal and economic recovery plan which included reducing the government's annual expenditures by more than $2 billion at the start of the next fiscal year in July 2009. Media speculation estimated that a reduction of such magnitude could require permanently laying off up to 30,000 government workers. On 1 May 2009, a mass of workers marched through the streets of San Juan in response to the governor's plan, protesting the government's preparation for impending layoffs. Most of the frustration of the Puerto Rican constituents was due to the then candidate Luis Fortuno swearing that he would not lay off a single employee yet in his 3 March speech he warned that the $3.2 billion deficit he encountered might require laying off over 20,000-30,000 government employees.

On 15 October 2009, thousands of Puerto Rican workers and supporters gathered for what organizers tried to pass as a "general strike" over government budget cuts. Puerto Rico's unemployment rate exceeded 16.7 percent in June, 2010, according to the U.S. Bureau of Labor Statistics. The Fortuño administration expected the layoffs to propel that rate to 17.1 percent (the unemployment rate for April 2010 was 17.2).

On 26 August 2010, teachers unions staged one day walkout to protest what they say was Fortuño' plans to privatize employee pensions, a shortage of teachers and the deterioration of the school system. The walkout was the largest labor protest in public schools on the island since a 10-day strike in 2008 as teachers demanded improved wages and working conditions. The University of Puerto Rico's administration under Fortuño attempted to enforce a $800 quota on students which led to the 2010–2011 University of Puerto Rico strikes.

As a result of all the cost-cutting measures taken during his first two years in office, and the approval of Law 154 which imposes a temporary excise tax on overseas sales by major corporation over 6 years in a declining scale beginning at 6% which may be taken by affected corporation as a credit on their federal tax returns, on 31 January 2011, Fortuño signed Law 1 of 2011, the new Internal Revenue Code that provides, retroactive to 1 January 2010, tax relief including a 50% tax cut for individuals and 30% for businesses, beginning with a 7–14% tax cut for individuals and a 7% tax cut for businesses effective during tax year 2010.

Due to cost-containment and revenue generation measures, fiscal year 2009-10 ended with a $2 billion structural deficit, followed by a $1 billion structural deficit in 2010–11, $610 million in fiscal year 2011–12, $332.7 million in 2012–13, with a goal of achieving a structurally balanced budget by 1 July 2013.

==== Residente comments ====
On 15 October 2009, Calle 13 won the Premios MTV Latinoamérica for "Best Urban Artist". Pérez hosted the ceremony, and used this exposure to insult Puerto Rican governor Luis Fortuño and comment about a civilian general strike that was organized earlier that day, held to protest the firing of more than 25,000 public employees by Fortuño's administration. Pérez generated much controversy after referring to Fortuño as an "hijo de la gran puta" The phrase is commonly translated as "son of a bitch"; in Spanish it is an insult to the person itself, equating to "bad person".

==== Rumored potential candidacy for national office ====
Governor Fortuño was mentioned more than once as a long-shot potential candidate for nomination for president or vice president in 2012 and his frequent campaign trips to the mainland during the 2010 congressional races have been linked to potential national aspirations.

George Will endorsed Fortuño's support for statehood as a national Republican strategy.

On 26 June 2011, he announced in Bayamón that he would seek a second term as Governor of Puerto Rico. In interviews he said that he would not aspire to a national office in 2012. More recently, Republican consultant Roger Stone mentioned Fortuño as a potential vice presidential nominee to win Hispanic American votes in 2012. In 2012, his name has continued resonating for national office.

Fortuño was included in an occasional vice presidential "short list". In August 2012, Politico reported that Fortuño "is liked and trusted in the Romney campaign" and "Commerce or Interior are possibilities" for Fortuño in a potential Romney cabinet.

==== Obama names Fortuño to Council of Governors ====
President Barack Obama nominated Governor Fortuño to the Council of Governors, a bipartisan commission aimed at improving coordination of efforts between state and federal agencies to address matters of defense and national security.

==== Elected to leadership of the Council of State Governments ====
On 22 May 2010, Governor Fortuño was elected vice president of the Council of State Governments (CSG), the first Puerto Rican to hold a leadership position in that intergovernmental organization since his now–secretary of state, Kenneth McClintock, served as chairman in 1999. CSG represents the three branches of government of the 55 states and territories of the nation. Several Canadian provinces are international members of the organization, as well. On 22 October 2011 he was chosen president of CSG for 2012.

==== Center for Best Practices of the National Governors Association ====
Between 2010 and 2012, Fortuño served on the board of directors of the Center for Best Practices of the National Governors Association.

==== Chairman of the Southern Governors' Association ====
On 21 August 2011, Governor Fortuño assumed the chairmanship of the Southern Governors' Association and unveiled his new initiative, which served as the organization's policy focus for the year, to create jobs and spur economies in the Southern region by increasing trade, investment and exports with Latin America.

The initiative, titled "Growth Beyond Our Borders," focused on creating jobs and increasing exports from Southern states and territories by the end of 2012 by enabling private sector businesses and entrepreneurs to tap into dynamic and emerging Latin American markets, which represent 550 million prospective clients.

The association's membership is composed of the governors of Alabama, Arkansas, Florida, Georgia, Kentucky, Louisiana, Maryland, Mississippi, Missouri, North Carolina, Oklahoma, Puerto Rico, South Carolina, Tennessee, Texas, U.S. Virgin Islands, Virginia and West Virginia.

==== Commemoration of Quincentenary of the Governorship of Puerto Rico ====
In 2010, Fortuño created a Commission for the Celebration of the Quincentenary of the Governorship of Puerto Rico, a celebration that began on 12 October 2010 and will extend to 19 November 2011. As part of the celebration, at the tail-end of a Trade Mission to Spain, he led a celebration of the life of Puerto Rico's first governor Juan Ponce de León in Santervás de Campos, near Valladolid on 21 January 2011. He also spoke that day at the Universidad de Valladolid.

==== Constitutional amendments ====
On 19 August 2012, voters rejected two constitutional amendments proposed by the governor and submitted by two-thirds of the Legislature for a referendum. The first amendment would have reduced the size of the Senate from 27 to 17 members and of the House of Representatives from 51 to 39 members. While the governor's main opponent, PDP gubernatorial candidate, Senator Alejandro García Padilla supported the amendments, most PDP voters did not follow his lead and contributed to the defeat of both amendments, which was also opposed by the Puerto Rican Independence Party and three minor parties.

== Post-gubernatorial life ==
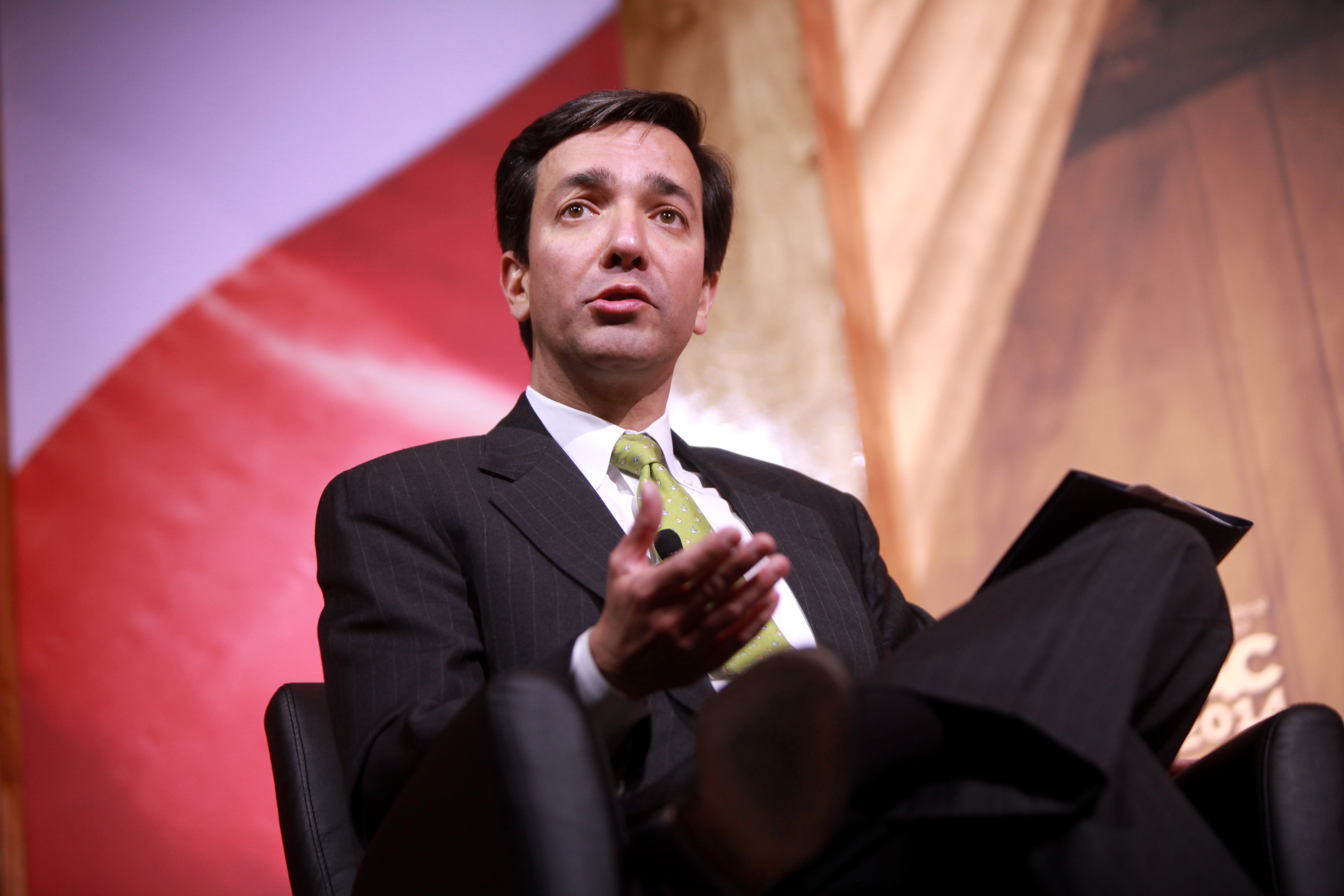
Luis Fortuno speaking at the 2014 Conservative Political Action Conference (CPAC) in National Harbor, Maryland

On 9 January 2013, Fortuño presented his resignation to the presidency of the New Progressive Party, and accepted the party directorate's request that he serve as the acting president until 3 February, when Pierluisi was selected to succeed Fortuño.

Fortuño moved to Washington, D.C., in early 2013. and joined as a partner the Steptoe & Johnson law firm in its Corporate, Securities & Finance Group and the Government Affairs and Public Policy Group. He is also involved in Steptoe's Latin American practice. In February 2024 he moved to Reed Smith LLP, where he is a partner at the firm's Global Regulatory Enforcement Practice Group.

Fortuno is a frequent speaker in forums related to business and conservative causes.

After the attack on the US Capitol on 6 January 2021, he, along with 30 other former Republican members of Congress, called on their former colleagues to pass articles of impeachment against President Trump.

He supported libertarian candidate Javier Milei in 2023 Argentine general election.

== Orders, awards and recognition ==
- Order of Isabel the Catholic, Commander by Number, awarded by King Juan Carlos I of Spain in 2009

== Ancestry ==
Ancestors of Luis Fortuño

8. Luis Fortuño y Nogueras; b. Puerto Rico
4. Luis Fortuño y Álvarez; b. Puerto Rico
9. Concepción Álvarez y López Arias; b. Puerto Rico
2. Luis Fortuño Moscoso; b. Puerto Rico
10. Guillermo H. Moscoso y Rodríguez
5. Delia María Moscoso y Vera
11. Carmen María Vera y Riera
1. Luis Guillermo Fortuño Burset; b. San Juan, Puerto Rico
12. José Burset y Masferrer
6. Zoilo José Rafael Burset y Angüita
13. María Concepción Angüita y Ruiz
3. Shirley Joyce Burset de Mari
14. Juan François de Mari; b. Corsica, France
7. María de Mari y Medina; b. 1903– Patillas, Puerto Rico
15. Carmen Medina y Muñiz; b. Juana Diaz, Puerto Rico

== See also ==
- List of Hispanic Americans in the United States Congress

Non-profit organization positions
Preceded by Kenneth McClintock	President of the Puerto Rico Statehood Students Association; 1980–1981	Succeeded by Oreste R. Ramos
U.S. House of Representatives
Preceded by Aníbal Acevedo Vilá	Resident Commissioner of Puerto Rico; 2005–2009	Succeeded by Pedro Pierluisi
Preceded by Ileana Ros-Lehtinen	Chair of the Congressional Hispanic Conference; 2007–2009	Succeeded by Mario Díaz-Balart
New seat	Shadow Member of the U.S. House of Representatives from Puerto Rico; 2017–2021	Succeeded by Elizabeth Torres
Party political offices
Preceded by Pedro Rosselló	Chair of the Puerto Rico New Progressive Party; 2008–2013	Succeeded by Pedro Pierluisi
Preceded by Pedro Rosselló	New Progressive nominee for Governor of Puerto Rico; 2008, 2012	Succeeded by Ricky Rosselló
Political offices
Preceded by Aníbal Acevedo Vilá	Governor of Puerto Rico; 2009–2013	Succeeded by Alejandro García Padilla
