= Manuel A. Torres =

Puerto Rican politician

Manuel A. Torres Nieves
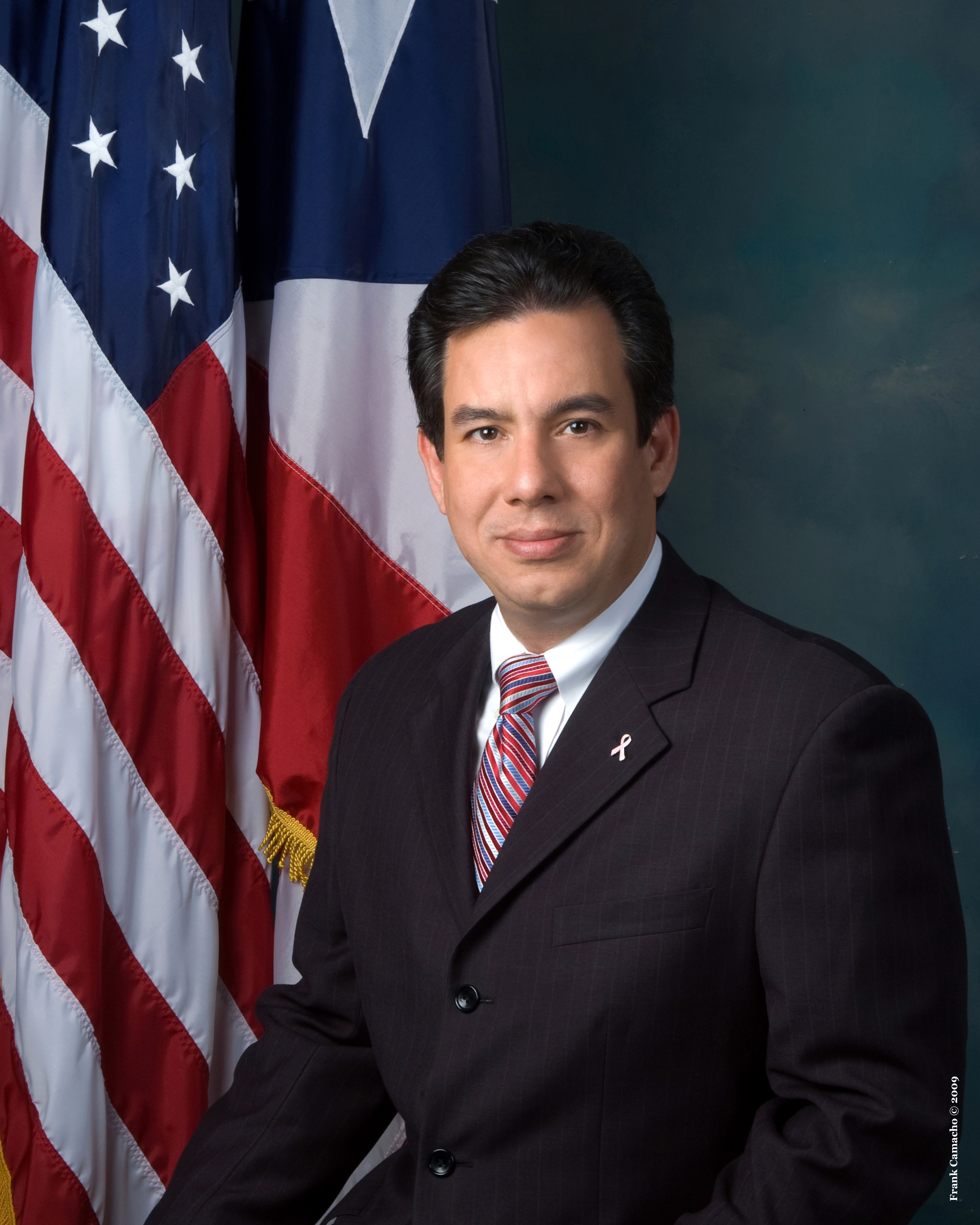

24th Secretary of the Senate of Puerto Rico
- In office January 9, 2017 – January 11, 2021

1st Electoral Comptroller of Puerto Rico
- In office March 9, 2012 – January 8, 2017
- Succeeded by: Walter Martínez

22nd Secretary of the Senate of Puerto Rico
- In office January 10, 2005 - March 8, 2012
- Preceded by: Jose Ariel Nazario Alvarez
- Succeeded by: Madeline Rivera-Carrucini, Acting Secretary

Personal details
- Born: April 9, 1965 (age 61) San Juan, Puerto Rico
- Party: New Progressive Party (NPP)
- Spouse: Linnette Martínez-Ruiz
- Children: 2 (Jessica and Alex Manuel)
- Education: Universidad del Este (ABA) (BBA); University of Puerto Rico (MPA)
- Profession: Public Official
- Website: http://senado.gov.pr

Manuel A. Torres Nieves (born April 9, 1965) is a Puerto Rican politician who served as Puerto Rico's secretary of the Senate of Puerto Rico, from 2005 to 2012, and again from 2017 to 2021. Torres also served as acting president of the senate from January 1–12, 2009, between the Senate presidencies of Kenneth McClintock and Thomas Rivera Schatz. He then served as Puerto Rico's first Electoral Comptroller.

== Private life ==
Born in San Juan, Puerto Rico on April 9, 1965, and a long-time resident of Puerto Rico's largest public housing project, with his parents' help he was able to excel in school and obtain an associate degree (ABA) and a bachelor's degree (BBA), both in Business Administration majoring in management with the distinction "Magna Cum Laude" from the Universidad del Este of the Sistema Universitario Ana G. Méndez. He obtained his master's degree in public administration (MPA)from the University of Puerto Rico with a major in Administration and Fiscal Policy, with the distinction of "summa cum laude", on June 29, 2011, and an additional specialty in personnel management. In 1991 joined the Puerto Rico National Guard. Since 2016 he is a Certified Fraud Examiner (CFE). A member of the Police Athletic League and the Boys and Girls Club of San Juan, he also excelled in basketball. A widower and a member of the Episcopal Church, he is the father of Jessica and Alex Manuel, a CBP federal agent and the father of Torres' only granddaughter and grandson. He is now married to Linnette Martínez-Ruiz.

== Public life ==
Torres began his public service career in 1991 as Ranking Minority Staffer in the Youth Affairs Committee of the Puerto Rico House of Representatives. He subsequently served in the highly sensitive position of executive director of the ethics committee Office at the House, chief of staff to the House Majority Leader and advisor to the director of the Puerto Rico Office of Legislative Services.

For two years, he served as one of Puerto Rico's two representatives in the Council of State Governments Committee on Suggested State Legislation.

Gov. Pedro Rosselló appointed Torres to the board of directors of the Puerto Rico State Insurance Fund Corporation, which has a monopoly on workmen's compensation, and to the board of the Puerto Rico Automobile Accident Compensation Administration (ACAA). He was confirmed both times by the Senate of Puerto Rico in a unanimous vote.

From 2001 to 2004 he was chief of staff to the Senate Minority Leader and legislative advisor to the deputy mayor of the City of San Juan.

Within the NPP, Torres was active for years in its NPP Youth organization. He also was member of the party's Rules Committee, as well as its State Board.

After the 2004 election, incoming Senate President Kenneth McClintock appointed Torres to head the Senate's transition committee and on January 10, 2005, Torres was elected by the Senate as its secretary, its top staffer.

During the 2005–2008 term, the Senate Secretary confronted the particular challenges created by the split within the majority party caucus over whether former governor Pedro Rosselló should topple McClintock and replace him as Senate President, a split which ended in March 2008 after party primaries, and by the fact that there was a partisan split between the governor and the Legislative Assembly.

Torres probably was the most high-profile Senate Secretary since 1949, when the Senate Presidency ceased to be the most powerful elective position held by a Puerto Rican, upon the election of Senate President Luis Muñoz Marín as Puerto Rico's first elective governor.

On January 1, 2009, after McClintock's term ended, Torres became Acting President of the Senate, gavelling in the new Senate on January 12, when the legislative body elected Thomas Rivera Schatz as the fourteenth president of the Senate.

Rivera Schatz announced on November 26, 2008, that Torres would be reelected as secretary of the Senate on January 12, 2009, making him the longest-serving Senate Secretary in half a century and the first to serve two consecutive terms under different Senate presidents.

After Rivera-Schatz's second term ended, Torres became acting president of the Senate, gavelling in the new Senate on January 11, when the legislative body elected José Luis Dalmau as the sixteenth president of the Senate.

In May 2009, Torres was inducted to the Hall of Distinguished Alumni of the Universidad del Este, which is part of the Ana G. Mendez University System.

In August 2010, Torres published his Master's thesis, entitled "Effect of the Full-Time Legislator in the Puerto Rican Legislature".

== Electoral comptroller ==
In January, 2012, Torres was appointed by Governor Luis G. Fortuño as the first electoral comptroller of Puerto Rico, a newly created post under Law 222 of 2011. He was confirmed by the Senate by a wide margin with a few notable exceptions, and by a unanimous vote in the House on March 5, 2012. He was sworn in by McClintock, Puerto Rico Secretary of State, on March 9, after resigning his post as secretary of the Senate on March 8 after almost 7 years and 2 months holding that office.

As the U.S. territory's first electoral comptroller, Torres came under fire from leaders of the Popular Democratic Party (PDP) for his strict enforcement of Puerto Rico's new campaign finance law. The law, the first state campaign finance law enacted after the landmark United States Supreme Court case Citizens United v. FEC, prohibits deficit spending in political campaigns and includes strict campaign finance reporting.

On January 8, 2017, Torres resigned his post as electoral comptroller and was elected and sworn in the next day once again as secretary of the Senate upon the election of Rivera Schatz to a second term as president of the Senate, becoming the only Senate president to serve two non-consecutive terms in that leadership post.

== Nominated Comptroller of Puerto Rico ==
On March 11, 2021, Governor Pierluisi nominated Manuel A. Torres as Puerto Rico's next comptroller for a ten-year term ending in 2031.

== Sources ==
- https://web.archive.org/web/20061205024219/http://senadopr.us/
