= Rafael Román Meléndez =

Puerto Rican politician

Secretary of Education of Puerto Rico
- In office January 2, 2013 – January 2, 2017
- Governor: Alejandro García Padilla
- Preceded by: Edward Moreno
- Succeeded by: Julia Keleher

President Organization of School Administrators and Principals of Puerto Rico
- In office December 2012 – January 2013

Personal details
- Born: Rafael Román Meléndez Arroyo, Puerto Rico
- Party: PPD
- Education: University of Puerto Rico at Cayey (B.Ed.); Metropolitan University (M.Ed.)
- Occupation: teacher school principal

Rafael Román Meléndez is a teacher and school principal, and was the Secretary of Education of Puerto Rico. Before being appointed as Secretary, Román served as President of the Organization of School Administrators and Principals of Puerto Rico. He obtained a bachelor's degree in Secondary Education and Teaching from the University of Puerto Rico at Cayey in 1999, and a Master of Education from the Metropolitan University in 2005.

Román is the youngest person to hold the post of Secretary of Education in the history of Puerto Rico.

== Notes ==
Political offices
| Preceded by Edward Moreno | Puerto Rico Secretary of Education; 2013–2017 | Succeeded by Julia Keleher |
