= O. portoricensis =

O. portoricensis may refer to:

- Ocotea portoricensis, a flowering plant
- Ophionectria portoricensis, a sac fungus
