= Neftalí Soto =

Puerto Rican politician, farmer, and attorney

Secretary of Agriculture of Puerto Rico
- In office March 21, 2012 – January 13, 2013
- Governor: Luis Fortuño
- Preceded by: Javier Rivera Aquino
- Succeeded by: Myrna Comas

Secretary of Agriculture of Puerto Rico
- In office January 11, 1993 – January 13, 1997
- Governor: Pedro Rosselló

Personal details
- Born: Lares, Puerto Rico
- Education: University of Puerto Rico (BS); University of Puerto Rico School of Law (JD)
- Occupation: Farmer attorney

Neftalí Soto Santiago is a farmer, attorney and former Secretary of Agriculture of Puerto Rico.

Soto is from Lares, Puerto Rico has been engaged in the private practice of law, also worked as a District Judge of Utuado and Arecibo and as a Superior Judge of the Chambers of Utuado and Arecibo. He studied law at the University of Puerto Rico School of Law and holds a bachelor's degree in Social Sciences with a concentration in Economics from the University of Puerto Rico. He served as Secretary of the Puerto Rico Department of Agriculture under two governors, Pedro Rosselló from 1993 to 1997 and Luis Fortuño from 2012 to 2013. During his most recent stint, he succeeded Javier Rivera Aquino, also a native of Lares, who served for over 3 years since 2009.

As a farmer, Soto specialized in growing coffee. His traditional coffee hacienda in Lares became the base for the "Alto Grande" brand when he sold the property in 1990.

Soto unsuccessfully ran for the office of president of the Puerto Rico Bar Association.
