= Efraín Sánchez Hidalgo =

Puerto Rican academic and politician

Secretary of the Puerto Rico Department of Education
- In office 1957–1960
- Governor: Luis Muñoz Marín
- Preceded by: Mariano Villaronga Toro
- Succeeded by: Cándido Oliveras

Personal details
- Born: April 29, 1918 Moca, Puerto Rico
- Died: 1974 (aged 55–56)
- Education: University of Puerto Rico (BA); Columbia University (B.Ed, Ph.D.)

Military service
- Allegiance: United States of America
- Branch/service: United States Army
- Years of service: 1941–1946
- Rank: Captain

Efraín Sánchez Hidalgo (April 29, 1918 – 1974) was an educator, college professor and a former Puerto Rico Secretary of Education.

== Early Days and Military Service ==
Efrain Sanchez Hidalgo was born in Moca, Puerto Rico on April 29, 1918. His parents were Zenón Sánchez Avilés and Pelegrina Hidalgo Pérez. He studied at the Elementary School in Moca and High School in Aguadilla. Hidalgo served in the United States Army from 1941 to 1946 and was assigned to the 65th Infantry Regiment. During World War II, he served as a captain and commanded the first all-Puerto Rican military unit that engaged in combat with the enemy at the Maritime Alps. He was decorated with a Bronze Star Medal for his duty in combat.

Combat Infantryman Badge
	Bronze Star Medal	
World War II Victory Medal	American Defense Service Medal	European–African–Middle Eastern Campaign Medal
Army Presidential Unit Citation

== Education career ==
Hidalgo earned a Bachelor of Arts from the University of Puerto Rico. When he moved to the United States to further his education, he obtained a Bachelor of Education Magna Laude, and a PhD in psychology at the Columbia University. Hidalgo devoted the rest of his career to education, specifically dedicating 31 1/2 years to teaching as a college professor. As a professor at the University of Puerto Rico and other universities outside of Puerto Rico, Dr. Sánchez Hidalgo taught, among others, the following courses: Educational Psychology, Educational Sociology, Child Psychology, Adolescent Psychology, and Old Age Psychology. Hidalgo's educational achievements can be seen in his education award and his educational position in Puerto Rico. In 1971, he was selected by Outstanding Educators of America as a Distinguished Educator. Hidalgo was also appointed Secretary of Education of Puerto Rico from 1957 until 1960. He officially retired on February 4, 1974.

== Legacy ==
A middle school in Moca, Puerto Rico was named after him.
