= Electoral Comptroller of Puerto Rico =

The Electoral Comptroller of Puerto Rico is a post created in Puerto Rico by Law 222 of 2012, charged with the supervision and regulation of political finances for all elective offices in the U.S. territory with the exception of the Resident Commissioner, a federal position regulated by the Federal Election Commission.

The first, and so far, only Electoral Comptroller, Manuel A. Torres, was sworn in by Puerto Rico Secretary of State Kenneth McClintock on March 8, 2012, after being nominated by Governor Luis Fortuño in January 2012 and unanimously confirmed by both houses of the Puerto Rico Legislative Assembly on March 5. Torres serves a fixed 10-year term ending in 2022.

The Electoral Comptroller is charged with enforcing Puerto Rico's new campaign finance law, the first state campaign finance law enacted after the U.S. Supreme Court's landmark decision in Citizens United v. FEC. Law 222 requires strict campaign finance reporting and modernizes campaign contribution limits.

The Electoral Comptroller's Office operates separately from, but in coordination with, Puerto Rico's State Elections Commission, which previously hosted the now-defunct Office of Electoral Auditor.
