= Puerto Rico Reconstruction Administration =

Agency of the New Deal established in 1935

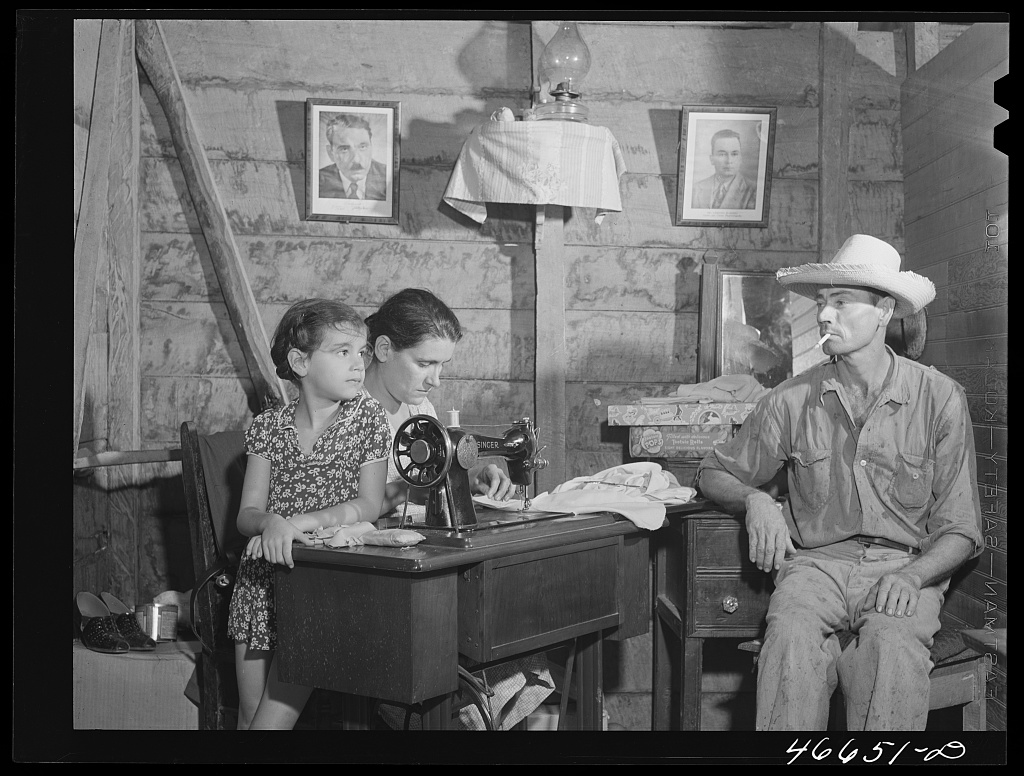
"Corozal, Puerto Rico (vicinity). In the home of a FSA (Farm Security Administration) borrower who raises some tobacco and a little sugar cane on his small farm between Corozal and Orocovis."- photo credit: Jack Delano, 1941.

The Puerto Rico Reconstruction Administration (PRRA) was one of the alphabet agencies of the New Deal established by the administration of President Franklin Delano Roosevelt. Created on May 28, 1935, the PRRA's first directors included American journalist and politician Ernest Gruening and Puerto Rican educator and politician Carlos Chardón. Falling under the authority of the Department of the Interior and the Farm Security Administration (FSA) its primary goals were to establish long term economic stability in Puerto Rico during the Great Depression through job creation, land distribution, public works projects, as well as environmental and health initiatives. The agency was officially liquidated on February 15, 1955.

== The Great Depression in Puerto Rico ==
=== Economic background and standard of living ===
By time the Great Depression arrived in 1929, working class Puerto Rican citizens, especially rural agricultural laborers, were already facing economic hardship. After Spain ceded sovereignty of Puerto Rico to the United States following the 1898 Spanish–American War the island increasingly became economically dependent on the United States through an unbalanced colonial trade relationship that favored U.S. sugar, tobacco, coffee, and fruit companies. By 1910, four U.S. sugar corporations held near monopolies on sugar cane cultivation and sugar production had multiplied by 331%. By 1921, the United States Tobacco Trust also held monopolies on cigarette and cigar markets in Puerto Rico, giving them an economic advantage over small scale tobacco farmers. While American companies expanded and profited, sugarcane and other agricultural workers saw little to no change in wages between 1898 and 1920 and Puerto Rican laborers generally experienced a poor standard of living. Malnutrition, poor sanitation, lack of sewage systems, and dangerous working and living conditions led to high mortality rates due to workplace accidents and diseases such as dysentery, diarrhea, malaria, and tuberculosis.

In the years immediately preceding the depression, negative developments in the island and world economies perpetuated an unsustainable cycle of subsistence for many Puerto Rican workers. The 1920s brought a dramatic drop in Puerto Rico's two primary exports, raw sugar and coffee, due to a devastating hurricane in 1928 and the plummeting demand from global markets in the latter half of the decade. 1930 unemployment on the island was roughly 36% and by 1933 Puerto Rico's per capita income dropped 30% (by comparison, unemployment in the United States in 1930 was approximately 8% reaching a height of 25% in 1933). Average wages for employed agricultural workers in 1931 ranged from roughly 23 cents per day for children, 25 cents per day for women, 60 cents per day for men, a number that varied due to the seasonal nature of their employment. Since the majority of Puerto Rico's arable land was reserved for export crops, 98% of Puerto Rican family income was spent on food and other necessities, which were imported from the United States and sold at inflated prices. In 1930, agricultural exports to U.S. comprised 94.3% of total Puerto Rican exports and food accounted for roughly 33% of total imports by 1935.

=== Labor strikes and social unrest ===
High unemployment rates and low wages at the start of the Great Depression led to increased labor unrest in Puerto Rico, which alarmed American officials and business interests. Beginning in August 1933 and lasting through the next two years, numerous violent strikes broke out among roughly 16,000 workers in the textile, stevedore, tobacco, taxi, and sugar industries and boycotts were called against American petroleum and electric corporations. American officials were also alarmed by the radical labor organizing leadership of Puerto Rican nationalists Albizu Campos and Jose Enamorado Cuesta who also called for independence from the United States. These factors combined with the economic fallout of the depression prompted the Roosevelt Administration to create relief, recovery and reconstruction policies specifically aimed at Puerto Rico.

== Early New Deal Relief and Reconstruction Efforts ==
=== The Puerto Rico Emergency Relief Administration (PRERA) ===
The first New Deal agency created to improve conditions in Puerto Rico was the Puerto Rico Emergency Relief Administration (PRERA) in 1933. The PRERA worked under the authority of the Federal Emergency Relief Administration (FERA) and through matching grants would provide direct relief funding and the creation of jobs through public works initiatives. Under its directors, the Roosevelt appointee James Bourne, and the island's governor, the American Robert H. Gore, the PRERA received only $770,000 from the federal government due to oversights in application processes. By the fall of 1933, the PRERA was unable to keep up with the flood of relief applications from Puerto Ricans, which totaled approximately 50,000 per month. Adding to the program's relative ineffectiveness was the 1933 implementation of an agricultural tax under the Agricultural Adjustment Act (AAA). The tax was leveled on surplus crops and served to increase food prices for Puerto Rican families who were already at a financial breaking point. The PRERA's primary successes came with its implementation of disease control measures, the building highway infrastructure, and in its distribution of food to needy families.

=== Plan Chardón ===
In 1934, recognizing a need for long term economic recovery and reform, a proposal was crafted by assistant secretary of agriculture, Rexford G. Tugwell, University of Puerto Rico rector Carlos Chardón, and Puerto Rican Liberal Party senator Luis Muñoz Marín. Entitled Plan Chardón, it called for the restructuring and decolonization of the Puerto Rican economy through the government acquisition of private U.S. sugar company land and mills. The acreage and production sites were to be taken under a rarely enforced land tenure measure written into the 1900 Foraker Act and the 1917 Jones Act. The 500-acre law, which stipulated that corporations operating in Puerto Rico were forbidden from owning more than 500 acres of land, was usually circumvented by proxy landownership and absenteeism. Under the proposed Chardón system the confiscated land would be redistributed to small-scale farmers and the landless who would in turn process sugar locally rather than ship it to the United States for refining. Other proposed projects included the creation of island-based fruit and vegetable canning and bottling facilities, and the promotion of island tourism and the cardboard manufacturing industries. The central intent of the plan was to break the monopolies of American corporations, diversify the economy, and to utilize available labor in the promotion of locally sourced industrial and agricultural development with the hope of raising the overall Puerto Rican standard of living. Plan Chardón was never officially enacted, as it did not receive the required approval of the U.S. secretary of agriculture. Further thwarting its implementation were questions of financing and the lobbying of U.S. sugar companies. Critics such as Albizu Campos claimed the plan and subsequent reconstruction efforts were not radical enough in that they still facilitated Puerto Rico's political and economic cooperation with the United States. Campos also called for a change in the 500-acre law that would amend the land owning quota to 300 acres.

== The Puerto Rico Reconstruction Administration (PRRA) ==
=== Establishment ===
On May 28, 1935 the Puerto Rico Reconstruction Administration (PRRA) was created by President Roosevelt under executive order 7057 and would operate under the authority of the Department of Interior and its secretary Harold Ickes. Modeled on Plan Chardón, the PRRA fell under the direction of American Ernest Gruening and Carlos Chardón. Gruening and Chardón oversaw a large bureaucratic agency whose administrators consisted of young Puerto Rican New Deal liberals, many of whom would become integral actors, along with Luis Muñoz Marín, in creating the pro-United States Popular Democratic Party of Puerto Rico (Partido Popular Democratico, or PPD) in 1938. With the $35 million in allotted federal funds it received in late 1935, the PRRA instituted a variety of initiatives that were mostly experimental in nature, but geared toward changing the Puerto Rican socioeconomic infrastructure.

=== Projects ===
In the early years of its existence, the PRRA's projects included the creation of public housing and parks as well as the construction of a fully functional cement factory, which provided essential materials for the construction of hurricane proof buildings. In 1935 and 1936 it purchased the Ponce Electric Company and two large centrals (sugar processing factories) in Arroyo and Arecibo. Island wide, it established health clinics and parasite eradication programs for farm animals and crops. Additionally, the PRRA built a model coffee farm and instituted reforestation and soil erosion projects in Puerto Rico's rural regions. The PRRA also organized a Producer's Association among small coffee and fruit farmers, which offered financial assistance and provided instruction in the use of new agricultural and marketing techniques. By 1936 the administration had employed between 50,000 and 60,000 Puerto Rican workers. Under the PRRA, the University of Puerto Rico received new infrastructure, an expansion of the types of educational programs available, and a boost in research support.

The most enduring program of the PRRA was its rural electrification program. The project facilitated the construction of seven hydroelectric dams and extended power lines and stations across the island, bringing affordable power to thousands of rural citizens for the first time in Puerto Rico's history. In addition to providing power, the hydroelectric dams also provided crucial flood control, irrigation for crops, and improved the quality of drinking water. The electrification program also helped to create the infrastructure for the future urban industrialization efforts under Operation Bootstrap.

=== Opposition and problems ===
Although another initial intention of Chardón-influenced PRRA was to seek enforcement of the 500-acre law and aid in land distribution among Puerto Rican citizens, the agency took no steps in this regard as it was not within its legal power to do so. Legal enforcement of the 500-acre law came with the Puerto Rican government's 1940 victory in a U.S. Supreme Court case against the Robert Hermanos Company, which owned 12,000 acres on the island. This pivotal lawsuit upheld the validity of the 500-acre law and set the stage for subsequent land reform in the 1940s. In 1941, the Land Authority of Puerto Rico was created under legislation entitled Law 26 of April 12, 1941. The Land Authority's parcelas provision allowed for the allotment of one to three acres of land to many poor, rural landless workers. With Chardón as its head, by 1945 the organization had parceled out plots to 14,000 families and by 1959 the number of families with acreage reached 52,287. Puerto Rican New Deal policies also did little in the way in improving wages for the island's workers. In 1940, the average per capita income for Puerto Rican workers remained roughly the same as per capita income from 1930. From its inception other problems such as minor financial mismanagement, opposition from members of the U.S. Congress and sugar companies also plagued the PRRA, and it was also criticized by the Puerto Rican Republican-Socialist coalition for purported political and economic corruption. Three years after its inception, statistics show that PRRA expenditures often benefitted business interests in the United States. By 1938, the program's total funding had reached $57,953,189.00 an estimated 12 percent of which had been used to buy goods and supplies from the mainland. Additionally, approximately 80 cents per dollar spent by the administration was funneled back into the United States economy.

=== Liquidation ===
The PRRA was officially dismantled by an act of Congress (67 Stat 584, August 15, 1953) on February 15, 1955, but its actual demise began as early as the late 1930s. In 1939, the administration received only $7 million in operating costs, just over half of its estimated budgetary requirements of $13 million and due to economic constraints, several of its initiatives were stalled. As a result, the insular government increasingly gained financial and administrative control over many of the PRRA's projects. Particularly hard hit were educational, health, and sanitation facilities. By World War II, Puerto Rico was forced to limit the services of or close numerous health care clinics, hospitals, and schools. Puerto Rico's location in the Caribbean and proximity to the United States, the Panama Canal, and Cuba made a place of strategic importance during World War II and the Cold War. Although the PRRA continued to receive aid from Washington, D.C. until 1955, most of its funding was directed toward the military fortification of the island rather than on its initial goal of economic reform.
