= Julia Keleher =

40th Secretary of the Puerto Rico Department of Education

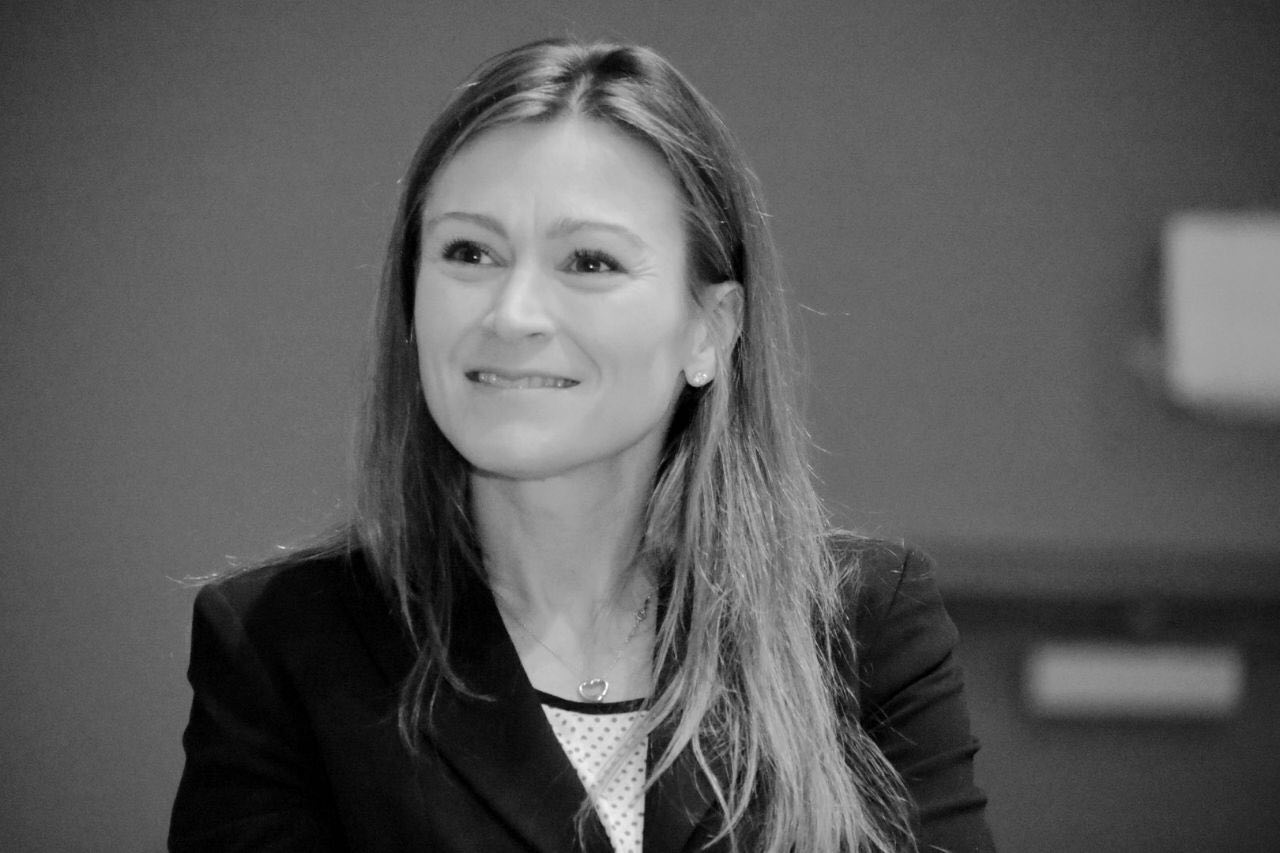

40th Puerto Rico Secretary of Education
- In office January 2, 2017 – April 1, 2019
- Governor: Ricardo Rosselló
- Preceded by: Rafael Román Meléndez
- Succeeded by: Eligio Hernandez

Personal details
- Born: Julia Beatrice Keleher; November 15, 1974 (age 51) South Philadelphia, Pennsylvania U.S.
- Education: University of Pennsylvania (BA, MA); Strayer University (MBA); University of Delaware (EdD)

Julia Beatrice Keleher (born November 15, 1974) is an American educator and former Secretary of the Puerto Rico Department of Education (PRDE) under the Ricardo Rosselló administration.

As the Secretary of the Puerto Rico Department of Education Keleher led the response and recovery to Hurricane Maria in 2017.

Keleher was the subject of intense public criticism as a result of closing over 450 schools in Puerto Rico and the reforms she advanced to reduce bureaucracy in the Department.

== Puerto Rico Secretary of Education ==
On December 28, 2016, Keleher was appointed Puerto Rico Secretary of Education by Governor-elect Ricardo Rosselló. In her new role, Keleher said her goal was to transform the K-12 educational system by decentralizing the system, where previously all of the decision-making power was held within the Office of the Secretary. She instituted seven Local Education Agency (LEA) districts, located in San Juan, Bayamón, Caguas, Humacao, Ponce, Arecibo and Mayagüez, with delegating authority, local decision-making ability, and new structures.

Keleher has been recognized by two Excellence in Government programs (2010, 2012), named Outstanding Professor of Project Management (2014) at George Washington University, [10] identified as an Extraordinary Changemaker (2017), and awarded the Leadership Award for Valor in Crisis (2018). She has made appearances on TODAY, PBS NewsHour, C-SPAN, and many other national TV programs, and been published across leading trade, academic, and mainstream publications.

== Hurricane Maria ==
On September 20, 2017, Puerto Rico was hit by the most devastating hurricane in 100 years. Hurricane Maria made landfall as a Category 5 hurricane and crossed the island from southeast to north, causing a huge amount of physical and emotional devastation and an unprecedented humanitarian crisis. The hurricane left 95% of the island without communications, food, water and medical care, and all 3.4 million residents lost electrical power.

Like everything else on the island, schools were damaged and shuttered. A total of 164 schools were used as shelters for 9,931 people as a huge number of homes had been completely destroyed. Many of the schools that were not used as shelters were severely damaged by the hurricane, and an estimated 44 schools would never reopen.

On October 23, 2017, 33 days after the storm, the PRDE re-opened 152 schools in the regions of San Juan and Mayagüez. The department was then able to open more schools, starting on a weekly basis and then on a daily basis. As of November 13, 2017, a total of 755 schools had been re-opened, many of them without power but with running water. Keleher had first estimated that 80% of the schools would reopen by mid-November; it turned out that a total of 932 schools (84%) had reopened by November 16. The PRDE adjusted the school calendar so that students would be able to complete the 2017–2018 academic year.

On November 8, 2017, US Secretary of Education, Betsy DeVos, Puerto Rican Governor Ricardo Rosselló, and Secretary Julia Keleher, paid a joint visit to the Loaiza Cordero School in the Santurce district of San Juan. Secretary DeVos announced that $2 million of federal funds would be awarded by the ED to aid in the recovery of the schools. Keleher allocated these funds to the purchase of textbooks, classroom materials, computers, the creation of STEM labs and various teacher professional development efforts

== Federal Charges ==
On July 10, 2019, Keleher was arrested in Washington D.C. by the FBI and accused of conspiracy and wire fraud. Legal issues within these charges led the prosecution to supersede the original indictment 13 months later with a revised theory of the crimes.

On January 14, 2020, Keleher was again indicted by the FBI on honest services fraud charges The allegations stated Keleher used her position to exchange 1,034 square feet of a public school in Santurce to a private company in exchange for an apartment in the Ciudadela apartment complex in San Juan.

Keleher filed various motions to dismiss in both cases and maintained her innocence. These motions were rejected and Keleher's trial was set to start in February 2021. Keleher submitted Motions to Change Venue, which was based on the overwhelmingly negative media coverage the case had received. Keleher had been the subject of intense public criticism as a result of closing over 450 schools. These motions were also denied.

On June 8, 2021, Keleher pled guilty before Federal Judge Francisco Besosa for two counts of conspiracy to commit fraud. The plea agreement with US Department of Justice prosecutors included six months in prison, and a year under house arrest. Some argued that taking a plea was Keleher's best option. On December 17, 2021, Keleher was officially sentenced to six months in prison and a year under house arrest and a fine of $21,000. As there was no loss to the government, she was not required to pay restitution.

== Incarceration ==
Keleher served her 6-month sentence at Federal Prison Camp Alderson, in West Virginia, the same prison where Martha Stewart and Lolita Lebrón served time. While at Alderson, Keleher worked as a teacher's aide and taught Adult Basic Education classes. She also taught English as a Second Language classes to Spanish-speaking women from Puerto Rico and Cuba. Keleher volunteered in the law library and assisted women with legal research. Recognizing the need to assist incarcerated women access legal support led her to pursue her Paralegal Certificate.

== Criminal Legal Reform Advocacy ==
Since her release in 2022, Keleher has been an active advocate for criminal legal reform. Her professional work includes designing workforce development programs for returning citizens and teaching criminal justice courses. She is a Smart Justice Ambassador with the ACLU and works on issues related to probation reform, expungement and police accountability. She provides pro bono support to the Prisoners Legal Advocacy Network’s Know Your Rights national voting rights initiative. She also writes on criminal justice reform topics.

== Early life, education and career ==
Keleher grew up as an only child in an Italian community in South Philadelphia, Pennsylvania. She graduated from Cardinal O'Hara High School in 1992. Keleher earned her BA in Political Science (1996) and her Master's in Psychological Services (1998) from the University of Pennsylvania. She completed her Doctor of Education in Educational Leadership (2007) from the University of Delaware and received her Master of Business Administration from Strayer University in 2013. She is a certified Project Management Professional from the Project Management Institute (2009) and is certified in Strategic Decision Making and Risk Management from Stanford University. From 2000 to 2007, Keleher worked as a guidance counselor, middle school educator, school administrator and assistant to the Superintendent prior to moving to Washington, DC.

=== Keleher & Associates, LLC ===
In 2009, Keleher founded Keleher & Associates, in Washington, D.C., a planning and project management firm. She began working full time at Keleher & Associates after leaving the US Department of Education. The firm specialized strategic planning, project management and performance evaluation services to states, local school districts, nonprofits and for-profit entities around the country. Keleher was a consultant in Puerto Rico for three years and was responsible for drafting the Department's Flexibilty Waiver request.

=== US Department of Education ===
From 2007 to 2010, Keleher worked for the United States Department of Education (ED) as a program manager for Puerto Rico Technical Assistance Leader, where she operationalized and executed a strategy for increasing the department’s capacity to mitigate risk in the grant portfolio. Keleher was promoted management in the USED’s Risk Management service, where she operationalized and executed a strategy for increasing the department’s capacity to mitigate risk in the grant portfolio. She co-authored a publication for IBM’s Center for the Business of Government in 2015

== Sources ==
- Aronoff, Kate (2021). Overheated. Bold Type Books. ISBN 978-1-5417-0046-8.
