= Carlos E. Chardón =

Puerto Rican mycologist (1897–1965)

Carlos E. Chardón Palacios
- Carlos Eugenio Chardón Palacios
- "Father of Mycology in Puerto Rico"
- Born: 28 September 1897; Ponce, Puerto Rico
- Died: 7 March 1965 (aged 67); San Juan, Puerto Rico
- Education: Cornell University (BA)
- Known for: Discovered vector of the sugar cane Mosaic virus
- Children: Carlos A. Chardón López
- Scientific career
- Fields: Phytopathology and Mycology
- Workplaces: Agricultural Experimental Station (1922) PR Dept of Agriculture (1920s); UPR (1931–1935); PR Reconstruction Administration (1930s); PR Lands Authority (1940) Tropical Agriculture Institute (1942)
- Patrons: Bolivia, Colombia, Dominican Republic, Iran, Puerto Rico, and Venezuela
- Doctoral advisor: Herbert H. Whetzel

Notes
- Carlos Fernando Chardón (brother)

Carlos Eugenio Chardón Palacios (28 September 1897 – 7 March 1965) was the first Puerto Rican mycologist, a high-ranking official in government on agriculture during the 1920s, the first Puerto Rican appointed as Chancellor of the University of Puerto Rico (1931–1935), and the head of the Puerto Rico Reconstruction Administration in the mid-to late 1930s during the Great Depression. He was also known as "the Father of Mycology in Puerto Rico". He discovered that the aphid "Aphis maidis" was the vector of the sugar cane Mosaic virus.

In the 1920s, he was appointed as Commissioner of Agriculture and Labor. In that position, he traveled in Central and South America, aiding agricultural programs in Colombia, Venezuela, Bolivia and the Dominican Republic. After serving as a university administrator and head of a major agency, he returned to his academic work in the fields of land use and agriculture in 1940 and later. He published several books on his studies in Puerto Rico and Latin America.

== Early life and education ==
Carlos Eugenio Chardón Palacios was born in Ponce, Puerto Rico, to Carlos Felix Chardón and Isabel Palacios Pelletier. His great-grandfather, Juan Bautista Chardón, a Catholic native of Champagne, France, immigrated to Puerto Rico from Louisiana in 1816, encouraged by the Royal Decree of Graces issued by the Spanish Crown, which was trying to attract new settlers to the island.

Chardón received his primary and secondary education in his hometown. In 1915, he began his studies in agriculture at the College of Agriculture and Mechanical Arts in Mayagüez. Chardón went to the United States to continue his college education at Cornell University in New York State after Mayagüez was struck by an earthquake in 1918. It did considerable damage to the university and the city, damaging hundreds of masonry and wooden buildings, both commercial and residential.

Chardón earned his B.A. degree in 1919 and continued towards his Master's. He specialized in phytopathology and mycology, and studied diseases of sugar cane under the supervision of Herbert H. Whetzel. Chardón earned his master's degree in 1921 and became the first Puerto Rican mycologist. He returned to Puerto Rico and began a career in the fields of taxonomy of fungi, phytopathology, and agricultural development. He continued to collaborate with Whetzel as well as Frank Dunn Kern on the rust and smut fungi of Puerto Rico.

== First Puerto Rican mycologist ==
Chardón worked as a phytopathologist at the Agricultural Experimental Station in Río Piedras. He became the first person to describe Ophionectria portoricensis in 1921. In 1922 he discovered the vector of the Mosaic virus of sugar cane, which was the aphid Aphis maidis. His findings were published in the Journal of Phytopathology.

Chardón was appointed Commissioner of Agriculture and Labor by Horace Mann Towner, the US-appointed governor. As commissioner, he continued his studies of the diseases of tobacco and sugar cane. In 1926 Chardón traveled to Colombia, where he reorganized the School of Agriculture of Medellín. He also traveled to Venezuela, Bolivia and the Dominican Republic to assist in their agricultural programs. In 1929 he returned to Colombia and established the Experimental Station of Palmira in Palmira, Valle del Cauca, Colombia.

== Chancellor of the University of Puerto Rico ==
He resigned from his position as Commissioner of Agriculture and Labor in 1931, when he was named by Theodore Roosevelt Jr., the US-appointed governor, as Chancellor of the University of Puerto Rico. As the first Puerto Rican to hold that position, Chardón was in a very prominent role.

Don Pedro Albizu Campos, president of the Puerto Rican Nationalist Party, believed that Chardón was being used by the US for its own interests at the university. He thought the Liberal Party of Puerto Rico, a leading political party of the time, was allied with US interests there. On 20 October 1935, the Nationalist Party broadcast their meeting in Maunabo, at which Albizu Campos denounced Chardón, the university deans, and the Liberal Party as "traitors," saying they wanted to convert the university into an "American" propaganda institution.

In reaction, on 23 October 1935, students at the university in Rio Piedras who supported Chardón began a signature drive to declare Albizu Campos as "Student Enemy Number One". A pro-Nationalist faction of students protested, denouncing Chardón and the Liberal Party in turn.

== Río Piedras massacre ==
The following day, 24 October, a student assembly at the university declared Albizu Campos Persona non grata (person not welcomed). Concerned about the potential for violence, Chardón requested the governor to provide armed police officers at the university because of the tensions. That day, two police officers saw what they thought was a suspicious-looking automobile and asked the driver, Ramón S. Pagán, for his license. His friend Pedro Quiñones was with him, and a confrontation developed that resulted in the deaths of Pagán and Quiñones. The local newspaper El Mundo reported the next day that an explosion and gunfire had been heard; the students Eduardo Rodríguez Vega and José Santiago Barea also died that day. The incident became known as the "Río Piedras massacre" and caused national outrage.

== Plan Chardón ==
In 1935, Chardón was appointed by Blanton Winship, the island governor, as head of the Puerto Rico Reconstruction Administration (PRRA). Luis Muñoz Marín, a senator in the Puerto Rican legislature and member of the Liberal Party of Puerto Rico, had encouraged formation of the agency; it was also modeled on some of the New Deal programs of the US President Franklin D. Roosevelt, developed by his administration to put people to work during the Great Depression. Well received, it was known informally as "Plan Chardón". It encouraged the training and development of Agriculture Technicians.

Chardón resigned from his positions in PRRA and the University of Puerto Rico because of his disagreements with the Government of Puerto Rico. He left Puerto Rico and helped in the agricultural and economic development of the Dominican Republic, Colombia, and Iran.

After returning to Puerto Rico in 1940, he held positions as director of the Land Authority (1940), and the Tropical Agricultural Institute in Mayagüez (1942).

== Marriage and family ==
Chardón married Dolores López Wiscovich; they had 4 children - two sons and two daughters. His second son, Carlos A. Chardón López, earned a doctorate at Syracuse University and became an educator and administrator. He served as Puerto Rico's Secretary of Education in 1977 and 2009.

His younger brother, Carlos Fernando Chardón (5 September 1907 – 9 December 1981), served as the Puerto Rico Adjutant General and Secretary of State of Puerto Rico from 1969 to 1973.

== Honors ==
- In 1932 the Venezuelan government gave Chardón the Liberator Cross and the Medal of Honor in Public Instruction.
- In 1935 he received an Honorary Doctorate from Dartmouth College in New Hampshire.
- In 1953 he received an Honorary Doctorate from the University of Puerto Rico in Río Piedras.

== Written works ==
- Mycological Explorations of Colombia (1930)
- Mycological Explorations of Venezuela (1934)
- Viajes y Naturaleza (1941), in which he described his trips in the United States and the Americas, and contributions of Latin American scientists.
- The first, second and third volumes of Los Naturalistas en América Latina (1949).

== Legacy ==
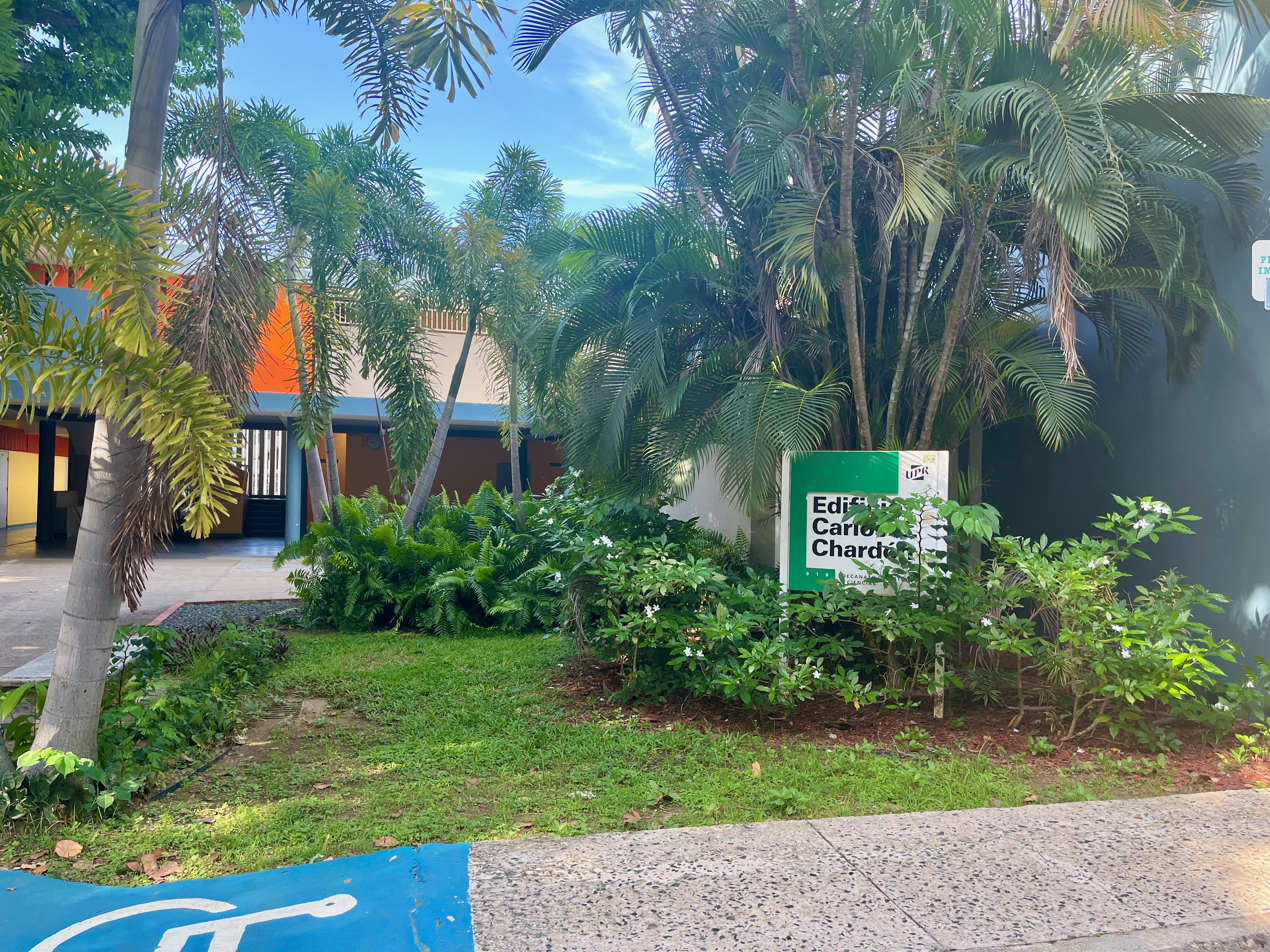
Edificio Carlos Chardón, a building at the Mayagüez Campus of the University of Puerto Rico

Chardón was in the process of publishing the fourth and fifth volumes of Los Naturalistas en América Latina when he died on 7 March 1965, in San Juan, Puerto Rico. He was buried at the Puerto Rico Memorial Cemetery in Carolina, Puerto Rico.

- The Puerto Rican Mycological Society sponsors the annual "Carlos E. Chardón Lecture" in his honor, held during the Annual Symposium of Mycology.
- A roadway was named for him in the Hato Rey section of San Juan.
- The General Studies building at the University of Puerto Rico, Mayagüez Campus is named Edificio Carlos E. Chardó in his honor.

== See also ==
- List of Puerto Ricans
- French immigration to Puerto Rico
- Puerto Rican scientists and inventors
- University of Puerto Rico at Mayaguez people
