= Ramón Mellado Parsons =

Puerto Rican educator, writer and politician

Member of the Puerto Rico Senate from the At Large district
- In office 1972–1976

Secretary of Education of Puerto Rico
- In office 1969–1971
- Governor: Luis A. Ferré
- Preceded by: Ángel Quintero Alfaro
- Succeeded by: Tania Viera Martínez

Personal details
- Born: October 31, 1904 Carolina, Puerto Rico
- Died: June 7, 1985 (aged 70) San Juan, Puerto Rico
- Political party: New Progressive Party of Puerto Rico
- Education: University of Puerto Rico (BS); Teachers College, Columbia University (MA, EdD)
- Profession: Politician, teacher

Ramón Mellado Parsons (October 31, 1904 - June 7, 1985) was an educator, writer, politician and a former Puerto Rico Secretary of Education.

== Early days ==
Had a bachelor's degree in Science from the University of Puerto Rico in 1927. In 1940 earned a Master of Arts from the Teachers College, Columbia University in New York and His Doctorate in Education in 1947.

== Education career ==
He worked as a science teacher at Julio L. Vizcarrondo Coronado High School in Carolina, Puerto Rico. He was subsequently appointed Superintendent of Schools (1932–34), General Supervisor of Sciences), Deputy Commissioner of Public Instruction and appointed Secretary of Education of Puerto Rico (1969–1971).

As a university educator he began in 1943, serving as Professor and Director of the Department of Pedagogy of the University of Puerto Rico, Río Piedras Campus until 1948. At this study center he held the positions of Dean of Administration (1948–56) and Professor of the Graduate School of Pedagogy (1957–68).

In 1948, he published "Culture and education in Puerto Rico".

== Politics ==
He was delegated to the Constitutional Convention of Puerto Rico in 1952. In 1972 he was elected Senator At-large by the New Progressive Party.

== Legacy ==
An elementary school in Carolina, Puerto Rico was named after him.
