= Rafael Cartagena Ródriguez =

Puerto Rican educator (1948–2025)

Dr. Rafael Cartagena Ródriguez

Secretary of Education of Puerto Rico
- In office 1989–1989
- Governor: Rafael Hernández Colón
- Preceded by: Awilda Aponte Roque
- Succeeded by: José Lema Moya

Personal details
- Born: April 13, 1948 Orocovis, Puerto Rico
- Died: May 27, 2025 (aged 77) San Juan, Puerto Rico
- Party: Popular Democratic Party
- Spouse: Dr. Alicia Rivero Vergne Phd
- Education: Pontifical Catholic University of Puerto Rico (BPhil); Pontifical Gregorian University (ThM); Nova Southeastern University (M.Ed., Ph.D.)

Dr. Rafael Cartagena Ródriguez (April 13, 1948 – May 27, 2025) was a Puerto Rican intellectual, educator and designated Secretary of Education of Puerto Rico.

== Early life ==
He was born in Orocovis Puerto Rico. He obtained his bachelor's in philosophy from the Pontifical Catholic University of Puerto Rico, his master's in theology from Pontifical Gregorian University, and a doctorate in education from Nova Southeastern University. He obtained a Post-doctorate Degree in Administration from Harvard.

He was a teacher in Colegio San Ignacio de Loyola from 1972 to 1973 and a professor in a number of universities in the early seventies including, the Inter American University, Bayamon Campus, 1972-1973, PUCPR in 1972, Universidad del Sagrado Corazón 1972-1973.

== Career ==
He was Dean of Academic Matters of the Regional Colleges of the Inter American University from 1974 till 1978 and in 1978 he was named Rector of the Interamerican University of Puerto Rico, Metropolitan Campus. Under his administration the main building of the Metropolitan Campus of the Interamerican University of Puerto Rico Campus was built and inaugurated. In said time he also hired international professors to promote a more worldwide view of education.

In 1987 after Dr. Ramon A. Cruz resigned the presidency of the Inter American University of Puerto Rico, he was endorsed by multiple groups for said role.

On December 20, 1988 he was designated by governor Rafael Hernandez Colon to be the Puerto Rico Secretary of Education.

From 1990 to 1993 he was president of the International Association of University Presidents. He led the program of preparation of teachers of the University of Puerto Rico, Río Piedras Campus and presided over the Teachers Examining Board of Puerto Rico.

He was Rector of University of Turabo and dean of the School of Education of said university. In the early nineteen nineties he founded Daskalos a private school in Cupey, Puerto Rico.

It was conceived as a distinct educational alternative for preschool, elementary, and higher education levels, based on years of research by teachers, university professors, and pedagogy experts. Its integrative approach is grounded in teaching connected to everyday life, with attention to different learning rhythms, and prioritizes the development of self-esteem, critical thinking, comprehensive English language skills from pre-kindergarten, as well as discovery as a learning method in science and mathematics. Cartagena believed in an education without peer competition, but rather focused on the student's personal growth.

He was fluent in Spanish, English and Italian, and was proficient in Latin, Greek, German and Portuguese. He was a member of PDK International.

He was a frequent contributor with essays and columns to newspapers such as El Mundo and El Nuevo Dia. He also ran his own consulting firm in educational and business systems and led the State Education Volunteer Project “Voluntario Estatal de Educación”, sponsored by Caribbean University, focused on channeling community efforts toward a structural transformation of Puerto Rico's education system.

== Written works ==
- Revisión debre la Tologia de la Esperanza – 1972 - thesis for Pontifical Gregorian University
- Freud, Filosofia y Religion - 1976 thesis for the University of Puerto Rico
- Background and Characteristics of Low and High Scoring Students on SAT Applying to Inter Ametrican University in Academic years 1975-76; 1976–77 and the Relationship of Their Scores to Their Academic Performance During Their First Semester of College, thesis for Nova University
- Puerto Rico Enfermo – 1983
- Una Agenda para la Excelencia Academica – 1984

== See also ==
- List of Puerto Ricans
