= Interamerican University of Puerto Rico, Metropolitan Campus =

University in Cupey, San Juan, Puerto Rico

Coordinates: 18.3691°N 66.0778°W

The Inter American University of Puerto Rico, Metropolitan Campus (Spanish: Universidad Interamericana de Puerto Rico, Recinto Metropolitano) is located in Cupey, San Juan, Puerto Rico. It was built in San Juan due to the large success of the Polytechnic Institute of Puerto Rico. It started its first semester in 1982. It is part of the Inter American University of Puerto Rico System.

Its main building was built and inaugurated under the administration of Dr. Rafael Cartagena Ródriguez. The campus offers courses in Nursing, Law, Social Work and Teaching.

In 2022, the campus reported having 5,001 students.

In 2023, the campus was in the process of being accredited by the Association of Theological Schools in the United States and Canada.

== Notable alumni ==
- Daniel George (Orlando, FL) - C.E.O of Limitless Home Health Care
