= Ophionectria =

Scientific classification
- Kingdom: Fungi
- Division: Ascomycota
- Class: Sordariomycetes
- Order: Hypocreales
- Family: Nectriaceae
- Genus: Ophionectria; Sacc. 1878

Species
- See text.

Genus of fungi

Ophionectria is a genus of fungi in the family Nectriaceae.

== Species ==
- Ophionectria africana
- Ophionectria ambigua
- Ophionectria annonae
- Ophionectria anomala
- Ophionectria balladynae
- Ophionectria belonospora
- Ophionectria briardii
- Ophionectria calamicola
- Ophionectria cinnabarina
- Ophionectria clerodendri
- Ophionectria cockerellii
- Ophionectria conica
- Ophionectria conoidea
- Ophionectria cupularum
- Ophionectria episphaeria
- Ophionectria everhartii
- Ophionectria foliicola
- Ophionectria globosa
- Ophionectria hendrickxii
- Ophionectria hidakaeana
- Ophionectria hyphicola
- Ophionectria lagunensis
- Ophionectria lobayenis
- Ophionectria luxurians
- Ophionectria macrorostrata
- Ophionectria magniverrucosa
- Ophionectria mellina
- Ophionectria muscivora
- Ophionectria oubanguiensis
- Ophionectria portoricensis
- Ophionectria rostrellata
- Ophionectria rubicola
- Ophionectria scolecospora
- Ophionectria tetraspora
- Ophionectria theobromae
- Ophionectria trichiae
- Ophionectria trichospora
- Ophionectria ulicis
- Ophionectria uredinicola
- Ophionectria vernoniae
