= Javier Rivera Aquino =

Puerto Rican politician, farmer, and agronomist

Secretary of Agriculture of Puerto Rico
- In office 2009–2011
- Governor: Luis Fortuño

Member of the Puerto Rico House of Representatives from the 22nd District
- In office 2005–2009
- Preceded by: Ramón Ruiz
- Succeeded by: Waldemar Quiles

Personal details
- Born: Lares, Puerto Rico
- Education: Ohio State University (BAgr)
- Occupation: Farmer

Javier Rivera Aquino, an agronomist and farmer, and former Secretary of Agriculture of Puerto Rico, appointed by Governor Luis Fortuño and sworn in by Secretary of State Kenneth McClintock on January 2, 2009. In December 2011 he announced that he would resign his office on the third anniversary of his swearing in, January 7, 2011, in order to spend more time with his family, which resides in Lares, a grueling two-and-a-half-hour one-way commute from the Department's offices in San Juan.

A former member of the Puerto Rico House of Representatives from 2005 to 2009, representing the towns of Utuado, Adjuntas, Jayuya and Lares, Rivera Aquino has Bachelor's of Science in Agriculture Soil Science from Ohio State University agronomist who owns and operated a farm in Lares.
