= Edward Moreno =

Secretary of Education of Puerto Rico

Secretary of the Puerto Rico Department of Education
- In office 2011–2013
- Governor: Luis Fortuño

Personal details
- Born: Fort Lauderdale, Florida
- Party: New Progressive Party of Puerto Rico
- Education: University of Puerto Rico (BA); Interamerican University of Puerto Rico (MBA); Dowling College (EdD)
- Profession: teacher

Edward Moreno Alonso is a Puerto Rican educator and former Secretary of Education of Puerto Rico.

Born in Fort Lauderdale, Florida and resident of Trujillo Alto, Puerto Rico earned a Bachelor of Arts in Language Arts from the University of Puerto Rico. Then, in 1992, he completed a Master's degree in Administration and Supervision of the Interamerican University of Puerto Rico. Subsequently In 2002 he completed his studies obtaining a Doctorate in School Administration at Dowling College.

He began his career in public service in 1984 as a Adapted Physical Education Teacher at the Casiano Cepeda High School in Río Piedras, Puerto Rico. He also worked from 1985 to 1991 as an Adapted Physical Education Teacher at the Agustín Cabrera Intermediate School in Carolina, Puerto Rico. During his career, he has received the Manuel A. Pérez Award, which is the highest recognition for public servants in the island. He has also served as Deputy Secretary of Education.

In 2011, with the resignation of Secretary of Education Jesús Rivera Sánchez, Moreno assumed the role on an interim basis. In November 2011, he said he was available to fill the position on a permanent basis. About a month later, Governor Luis Fortuño officially appointed him for the position. He was confirmed by the Senate of Puerto Rico on December 20, 2011.

Moreno ran for District Senator on the 2008 PNP primaries, but lost.
