= Odette Piñeiro Caballero =

Puerto Rican politician

Secretary of the Puerto Rico Department of Education
- In office 2010–2011
- Governor: Luis Fortuño
- Preceded by: Carlos A. Chardón López
- Succeeded by: Jesús Rivera Sánchez

Personal details
- Born: June 28, 1965 (age 61) Manatí, Puerto Rico
- Education: University of Puerto Rico at Mayagüez (BS); Penn State University (MS, Ph.D.)

Odette Piñeiro (born July 28, 1965 in Manatí, Puerto Rico) is the former Secretary of Puerto Rico Department of Education, appointed by Governor Luis Fortuño on December 14, 2009, confirmed by the Senate of Puerto Rico on December 18, 2009 and sworn in by Secretary of State Kenneth McClintock on December 30, 2009. She succeeded Dr. Carlos A. Chardón, who served as Fortuño's first Secretary of Education, and served until her resignation on May 28, 2010.

A majority party senator, Larry Seilhamer joined seven minority party legislators in opposing her confirmation. Nevertheless, she was confirmed in a 20-8 vote. Prior to her confirmation, she had been sworn in under a recess appointment five days before so that she could immediately take office and tackle multiple issues that the United States Department of Education was requiring be resolved by December 31, 2009.

Piñeiro graduated at the University of Puerto Rico at Mayagüez with a Bachelor of Science, and at Penn State University with a Master of Science and a Doctor of Philosophy. In 1988, she married Jesús Edgardo Colón, the current mayor of Orocovis, Puerto Rico, with whom she has two sons, both college students, one at Penn State and the other in Puerto Rico. She served as the town's First Lady until her separation several years ago. As an educational researcher and consultant, she has worked in Central America, Pennsylvania and Puerto Rico, including a stint as an educational advisor to the U.S. territory's Senate under the presidencies of Kenneth McClintock and Thomas Rivera Schatz.

Piñeiro resigned as Secretary of Education on May 28, 2010.

Political offices
Preceded by Carlos A. Chardón	Puerto Rico Secretary of Education; 2009-2010	Succeeded by Jesús Rivera Sánchez
