= Ophionectria portoricensis =

Scientific classification
- Kingdom: Fungi
- Division: Ascomycota
- Class: Sordariomycetes
- Order: Hypocreales
- Family: Nectriaceae
- Genus: Ophionectria
- Species: O. portoricensis

Binomial name
- Ophionectria portoricensis Chardón (1921)

Species of fungus

Ophionectria portoricensis is a species of fungus that was first described by Carlos E. Chardón in 1921. It was found growing on logs in Puerto Rico.
