= Ángel Quintero Alfaro =

Puerto Rican academic and politician

Secretary of the Puerto Rico Department of Education
- In office 1957–1960

Personal details
- Born: October 19, 1916 Morovis, Puerto Rico
- Died: May 13, 1992 (aged 75) Madrid, Spain
- Education: University of Puerto Rico (BA) University of Chicago (Ed.D.)

Ángel Quintero Alfaro (October 19, 1916 – May 13, 1992) was an educator, an essayist and a former Puerto Rico Secretary of Education.

== Early days ==
Born on October 19, 1916, in Morovis, Puerto Rico. He attended his first grades of school in his hometown. He entered the University of Puerto Rico, where he completed a bachelor's degree in mathematics and physics in 1937. Quintero Alfaro completed his master's in education and social sciences at the University of Chicago in 1943. In 1949 he was appointed Fellow at the Center for Advanced Study in the Behavioral Sciences at Stanford University in Palo Alto, California.

== Education career ==
For some years he worked as a teacher in San Germán and Manatí. In 1948 he returned to Chicago and completed his doctorate in 1949. The University of Chicago promoted theories of general education. From 1950 to 1958 he served as dean of the Faculty of General Studies.

Was appointed by Puerto Rico Governor Luis Muñoz Marín undersecretary of the Department of Instruction, a position he held from 1961 to 1964. In 1965 new governor Roberto Sánchez Vilella, appointed him secretary until 1968.

== Death ==
Quintero died during a trip to Madrid, Spain on May 13, 1992.

== Legacy ==
A middle school in Morovis was named posthumously after Ángel Quintero Alfaro.
