= Puerto Rico Automobile Accident Compensation Administration =

Government-owned organization

The Puerto Rico Automobile Accident Compensation Administration
- Company type: government-owned corporation
- Founded: 1970
- Headquarters: Puerto Rico

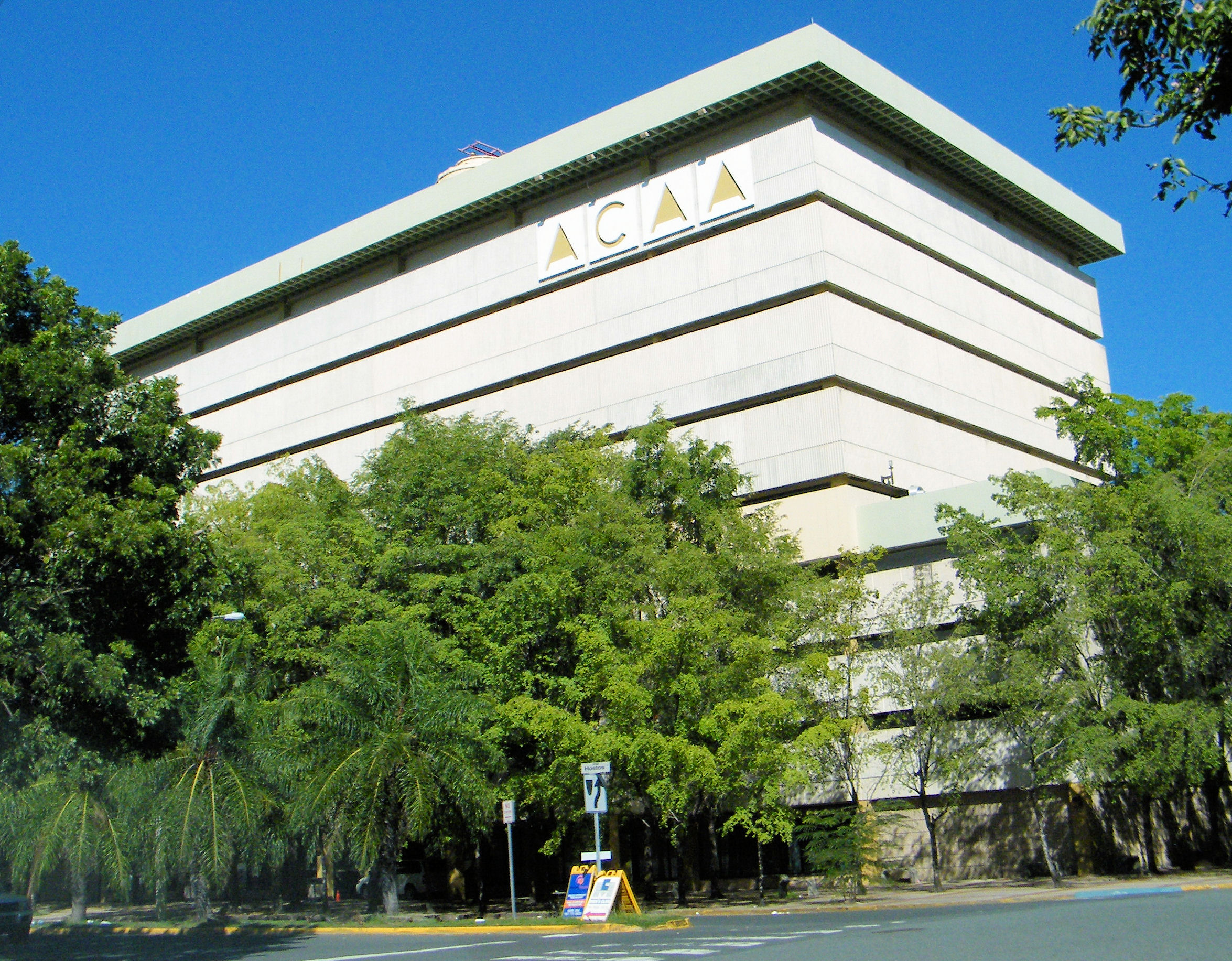
ACAA headquarters in San Juan

The Puerto Rico Automobile Accident Compensation Administration —Spanish: Administración de Compensaciones por Accidentes de Automóviles (ACAA) — is a government-owned corporation of Puerto Rico that provides compensation for medical and disability expenses resulting from traffic accidents in Puerto Rico. The coverage offered by the corporation is mandatory, but private insurance companies are allowed to provide supplemental policies. The corporation was created in 1970 pursuant to Law No. 138 of June 26, 1968.

The corporation is run by a board of directors appointed by the Governor of Puerto Rico with the advice and consent of the Senate of Puerto Rico. In 2013, Gov. Alejandro García Padilla signed into law a measure cutting short the terms of directors appointed by the previous governor and replacing them with new members.

The $35 annual premium has remained unaltered since its inception in the 1970s and has generated an investment fund that had prevented premium rate increases.
