= Puerto Rico Department of Agriculture =

Agricultural department of the Government of Puerto Rico

- Departamento de Agricultura de Puerto Rico
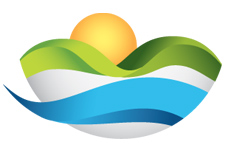

Department overview
- Formed: April 25, 1940; 86 years ago
- Preceding department: Puerto Rico Department of Agriculture and Commerce
- Jurisdiction: Executive branch
- Headquarters: 1311 Avenida Manuel Fernández Juncos; Santurce, San Juan, PR
- Department executive: Ramón González Beiró, Secretary
- Key documents: Law No. 60 of 1940; Article IV of the Constitution of Puerto Rico; Law No. 4 of 2010
- Website: www.agricultura.gobierno.pr

The Puerto Rico Department of Agriculture (Spanish: Departamento de Agricultura) is one of the few Cabinet-level government agencies explicitly created by the Constitution of Puerto Rico as the Department of "Agriculture and Commerce", most of the commerce at the time of its enactment being agriculture-based. The DAC oversees rural development work and conservation and is headed by a cabinet secretary. The current secretary is Ramón González Beiró who was confirmed in May 2021.

== History ==
Prior to the Constitution, according to law 60 of April 25, 1940, it was known as Department of Agriculture. The most recent reorganization of government responsibilities concerning the department come from Law No. 4 of 2010.

The purpose of DAPR is to:

- Support agricultural production, commercial fishing, and aquaculture to ensure fair prices and stable markets for producers and consumers;
- Work to improve and maintain farm income; and
- Help to develop and expand markets abroad for agricultural products.

== Activities ==
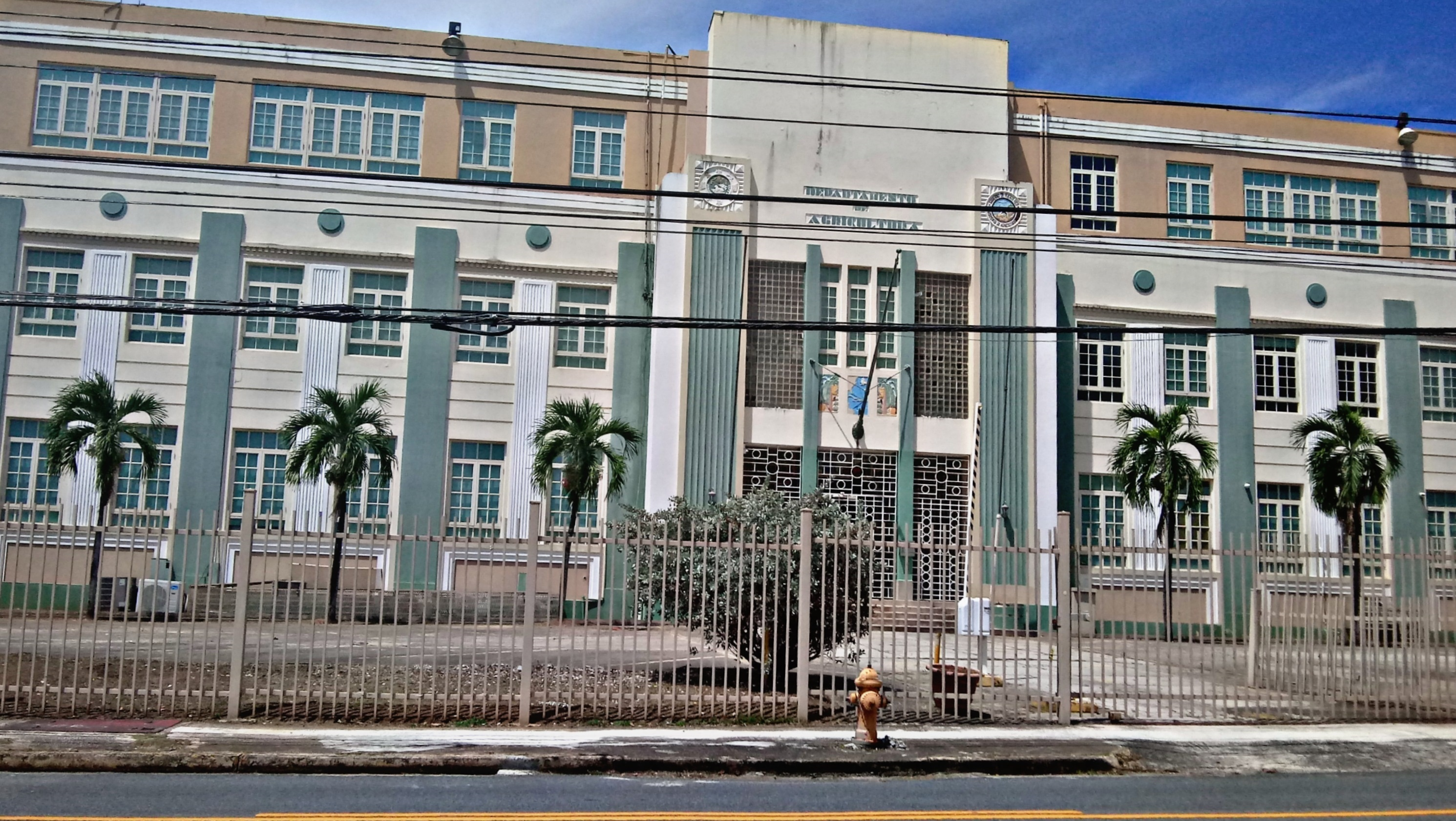
Puerto Rico Department of Agriculture building in Santurce, San Juan

DAPR administers rural development, credit, and conservation programs that are designed to implement national growth policies, and it conducts scientific and technological research in all areas of agriculture. Through its inspection and grading services, DAPR ensures standards of quality in food offered for sale.

Throughout the years, the department's name has been modified, as well as its structure, but today remains a separate structure with additional agencies and public corporations as part of the Department of Agriculture "umbrella".

The department is headed by a cabinet secretary, appointed by the Governor of Puerto Rico and subject to the advice and consent of the Senate of Puerto Rico. The current incumbent is Ramón González Beiró.

== Secretaries ==
- Miguel Hernandez Agosto
- Antonio González Chapell
- Carlos López Nieves
- Javier Rivera Aquino
- Justo A. Méndez Rodriguez
- 2012–2013: Neftalí Soto
- 2013: Myrna Comas Pagan
- Ramón González Beiró 2021-2024
- Irving Yoel Rodríguez Torres 2025-present
