= Mariano Villaronga Toro =

Puerto Rican educator (1906–1987)

- Born: November 9, 1906; Ponce, Puerto Rico
- Died: March 7, 1987 (aged 80); San Juan, Puerto Rico
- Education: University of Puerto Rico (BS); Harvard Graduate School of Education (M.Ed.)
- Occupations: Educator and Commissioner of Education

Mariano Villaronga Toro (9 November 1906 – 7 March 1987) was a Puerto Rican educator and Commissioner of Public Instruction in Puerto Rico from 1946 to 1957. Under his leadership as Commissioner of Public Instruction, three major institutions that still stand today were put in place: the Department of Education Printing Press, the public radio and television educational service, and the Free School of Music system. Most importantly, during his tenure Spanish was adopted as the official language of instruction in all levels of the Puerto Rico public education system, displacing instruction in English which had been pushed by the previous governments of Puerto Rico under US-appointed colonial governors.

== Early years ==
Mariano Villaronga Toro was born in Ponce, Puerto Rico on 9 November 1906. He came from well-regarded families in Ponce: the Villaronga family is best known today for the Casa Wiechers-Villaronga, a national landmark in downtown Ponce, and the Armstrong-Toro family, progenitors of Thomas Armstrong Toro, after whom a high school in Ponce is named, is best remembered for its Armstrong-Poventud Residence, another national landmark also in downtown Ponce.

== Training ==
Villaronga Toro graduated from Ponce High School in 1925 and received his B.S. in science from the University of Puerto Rico in 1929. After graduating from UPR, Villaronga went to work as a teacher in the Puerto Rico public school system. A few years later, in 1935, he became school principal at his alma mater. After these early experiences as an educator and public servant, Villaronga earned a master's degree in Education from Harvard University. Upon his return to Puerto Rico, he joined the faculty at the University of Puerto Rico. In 1943, he became head of the Department of General Studies there.

== Spanish language instruction pioneer ==
While a man of many talents, Villaronga Toro is mostly remembered for having established, in 1949 and while Commissioner of Public Instruction, the educational language policy of using Spanish as the instructional medium for all school years, with English being taught only as a special subject.

In 1946, the political leadership of the Popular Democratic Party recommended Villaronga for commissioner of Public Instruction, a post that at that time was appointed by the President of the United States. In the U.S. Senate hearings, however, Villaronga remained firm in his position in favor of using Spanish as the language of instruction in Puerto Rico, which cost him the Senate confirmation. The educational policy on the island, since the arrival of the United States, had established English as the language of public education to contribute to a process of Americanization of the Puerto Rican people.

In 1948, however, Luis Muñoz Marín, the first popularly elected governor, named Mariano Villaronga Commissioner of Public Instruction. He was quickly confirmed by the Puerto Rican Senate. In August 1949, Muñoz issued an executive order that all teaching would be done in Spanish at all levels in the public education system and that English would be offered as a special subject. In 1952, when the Commonwealth of Puerto Rico was formed, Villaronga was designated secretary of Public Instruction, a position he held until 1957.

== Spanish educational television pioneer ==
Under his direction, the groundwork was laid for the establishment of an educational public television network in Puerto Rico. The actual rollout occurred in 1958, two years after Villaronga had left office. The system, WIPR Television, was the first educational television station in Latin America.

== Education books by Villaronga Toro ==
Villaronga, Mariano. La Educacion Liberal, 1953

== Death ==
Mariano Villaronga died in San Juan in March 1987. He is buried at Puerto Rico Memorial Cemetery in Carolina, Puerto Rico.

== See also ==
- List of Puerto Ricans
- List of Puerto Ricans
- Education in Puerto Rico
- Photo of Villaronga Toro sitting next to Gov. Muñoz Marín in Costa Rica
- Photo of Villaronga Toro (center) during the ceremony of delivery of a library-on-wheels
- Photo of Villaronga Toro (sitting, 1st from the right) posing for a picture of Gov. Muñoz Marín and his Cabinet
