= Carlos A. Chardón López =

Puerto Rican educator and public servant

Carlos E. Chardón López
- Born: ca. 17 January 1939 (age 87); Maracay, Venezuela
- Education: Syracuse University (Ed.D.)
- Employer: Government of Puerto Rico
- Known for: Two-time Secretary of Education of Puerto Rico
- Title: Secretary of Education; Assistant Secretary of State
- Children: 2
- Parent: Carlos E. Chardón Palacios (father)

Carlos E. Chardon López (born ca. 17 January 1939) is a Puerto Rican educator, plant pathologist and public servant. He has served twice as Secretary of the Puerto Rico Department of Education and subsequently served under Secretary of State Kenneth McClintock as the first and only Assistant Secretary of State for Governmental Affairs.

== Biography ==
Carlos E. Chardón López was born in Venezuela, when his parents were there while his father was doing research in mycology. His father, Carlos E. Chardón Palacios (1897–1965), was Puerto Rico's first mycologist and the first native to be appointed as Chancellor of the University of Puerto Rico. His uncle Carlos Fernando Chardón (1907–1981), served as the Puerto Rico Adjutant General and Secretary of State of Puerto Rico from 1969 to 1973.

Chardón López did graduate work at Syracuse University in New York State to earn his doctorate. During that time, Chardón worked at the Division of Human Rights of the State of New York as a field representative.

== Political career ==
After returning to Puerto Rico, Chardón López was appointed as an aide to Governor Luis A. Ferré. A lifelong Republican, Chardón has served as Secretary of Puerto Rico's Republican Party and as a member of the Republican National Committee.

In the 1970s, Chardón López was first appointed as Secretary of Education of the Commonwealth, under Governor Carlos Romero Barceló. More than 30 years later, under Governor Luis Fortuño, he was appointed again to the position. He resigned on November 30, 2009, to take a position as Assistant Secretary for Governmental Affairs to Kenneth McClintock, Secretary of State of Puerto Rico.

Chardón López also chaired the Board of Directors of the Urban Renewal and Housing Corporation (Corporación de Renovación Urbana y Vivienda, "CRUV" in Spanish). At the federal level, he has served as liaison Representative of the Department of Health, Education and Welfare (HEW) (now Dept. of Health and Human Services). He also served as the Caribbean District Director for the U.S. Small Business Administration. He chaired the State Volunteer Action Board for AmeriCorps. On a volunteer basis, he served as Vice Chairman of the Puerto Rico Academy of Arts and Sciences.

== See also ==
- List of Puerto Ricans
- Carlos E. Chardón Palacios, father and mycologist

Political offices
Preceded by Rafael Aragunde	Puerto Rico Secretary of Education; 2009	Succeeded by Odette Piñeiro
Preceded by Herman Sulsona	Puerto Rico Secretary of Education; 1977–1980	Succeeded by María Socorro Lacot
