= Jesús Rivera Sánchez =

Secretary of the Puerto Rico Department of Education
- In office 2010–2011

Personal details
- Born: 1970 (age 55–56) Coamo, Puerto Rico
- Party: Popular Democratic Party

Jesús Rivera Sánchez (born in Coamo, Puerto Rico) is a Puerto Rican government official who served as the Secretary of the Puerto Rico Department of Education from 2010 to 2011.

== Career ==
Rivera Sánchez was appointed on September 15, 2010 after protests by the general student body of Puerto Rico who are seeking remedies to the socioeconomic crisis faced by their institution, and two months of constant debate between the Senate of Puerto Rico and Governor.

In September 2011, it was revealed that Rivera Sánchez was under investigation from the Puerto Rico Electric Power Authority for alleged electricity theft. Although Rivera Sánchez denied the allegations, reports from the authority reflected irregularities in his electricity counter dating back to 2003. At the same time, Rivera Sánchez faced accusations of nepotism after it was revealed that several of his relatives were promoted during his tenure. As a result, members of the Popular Democratic Party asked for his resignation. Rivera Sánchez initially denied that he would resign from his position.

On October 23, 2011, a fire was reported inside the house of Rivera Sánchez. As a result, he decided to resign to his position on the same day. Days after the fire, investigators revealed there were irregularities in the testimonies regarding the nature of the fire. Rivera Sánchez has been questioned about it in several occasions and the investigation is still pending.

Political offices
Preceded by Odette Piñeiro	Puerto Rico Secretary of Education; 2010-2011	Succeeded by Edward Moreno
