= List of high schools in Puerto Rico =

This is a list of high schools in the Commonwealth of Puerto Rico.

== Adjuntas Municipality ==
- José Emilio Lugo High School

== Aguada Municipality ==
- Escuela Superior Arsenio Martínez
- Escuela Superior Dr. Carlos González

== Aguadilla Municipality ==
- First Bilingual Preparatory School
- Benito Cerezo Vázquez
- Colegio San Carlos
- Liceo Aguadillano
- Juan Suárez Pelegrina
- Vocacional Salvador Fuentes
- Colegio Corpus Christi
- Ramey High School
- Carib Christian School
- Advanced Bilingual School
- Academia Adventista
- Escuela Antolina Velez

(Interamericana)

- Friedrich Froebel Bilingual School

== Aguas Buenas Municipality ==
- Josefa Pastrana School
- Escuela Urbana De Aguas Buenas

== Aibonito Municipality ==
- Dr. José N. Gándara School

== Añasco Municipality ==
- Luis Muñoz Marín School
- Sergio Ramírez de Arellano-Hostos Regional Bilingual Secondary School

== Arecibo Municipality ==
- Abelardo Martínez Otero School
- Academia Adventista del Norte
- Colegio San Felipe
- Dra. María Cadilla De Martínez Urban Community High School
- Hogar Colegio La Milagrosa hclmpr.com
- Superior Vocacional Antonio Lucchetti
- Trina Padilla De Sanz School

== Arroyo Municipality ==
- Carmen Bozello De Huyke School - La High de Arroyo
- Natividad Rodriguez - New High School

== Barceloneta Municipality ==
- Fernando Suria Chávez School
- Academia Nuestra Señora de Fátima

== Barranquitas Municipality ==
- Luis Muñoz Marín School, Código escolar : 26021
- Pablo Colón Berdecía School, Código escolar:

== Bayamón Municipality ==
- Academia Claret
- Academia Discípulos de Cristo
- Agustín Stahl High School
- Academia Santo Tomás de Aquino Superior
- Agustín Stahl School
- American School
- Antilles High School, Fort Buchanan
- Avanze 2000 (Wilma Chavez)
- Bayamón Military Academy (B.M.A.)
- Baldwin School
- Colegio Adazul
- Cacique Agüeybaná Superior School
- Colegio Beato Carlos Manuel Rodríguez (Antigua Escuela Superior Católica)
- Colegio Hostosiano de Puerto Rico
- Colegio De La Salle
- Colegio Luterano Santísima Trinidad
- Colegio Nelson Velázquez
- Colegio Nuestra Señora del Rosario
- Colegio Pedro "EL GALLERO" Flores
- Colegio Sagrada Familia
- Colegio San Agustín
- Colegio Santa Rosa Superior
- Colegio Santiago Apóstol
- Escuela Ecológica Siglo XXI Dr. José Antonio Dávila
- Emadrian Bilingual School
- es:Escuela especializada en bellas artes Pablo Casals
- Miguel De Cervantes Saavedra School
- Miguel Meléndez Muñoz School
- Papa Juan XXIII (23) School
- Pedro P. Casablanca School
- Puerto Rico Advancement College (PRACI)
- Rexville Superior School
- Tomás C. Ongay School

== Cabo Rojo Municipality ==
- Monserrate León de Irizarry High School
- Colegio San Agustín
- Cabo Rojo Christian Academy
- Inés María Mendoza High School
- Luiz Munoz marin
- Colberg

== Caguas Municipality ==
- Colegio Católico Notre Dame
- Academia Cristo de los Milagros
- Caguas Military Academy
- Colegio Bautista de Caguas
- Colegio San José de Villa Blanca
- Colegio San Juan Apóstol
- Colegio Santa Rosa Superior
- Dr. Juan José Osuna School
- Felipe Rivera Centeno School
- Colegio Kiany
- José Gautier Benítez
- Manuela Toro Morice
- New Generation Christian Academy (formerly, Colegio Las Americas)
- Thomas Alva Edison School
- Caguas Private School
- Eloisa Pascual
- Escuela Vocacional-Rep de Costa Rica
- Esc. Felix A Gonzalez
- Escuela Secundaria Especializada en Bellas Artes y Tecnología (EBATEC)
- Escuela Secundaria Especializada en Ciencias, Matemáticas y Tecnología (CIMATEC)
- B-You Academy
- Nuestra Escuela
- Caguas Learning Academy
- Hollands Academy
- Esc. Concepción Méndez Canó

== Camuy Municipality ==
- Luis F. (Pipo) Crespo High School
- Pablo Avila Superior School (Old High School)
- Santiago R. Palmer Superior School

== Canóvanas Municipality ==
- Antonio R. Barceló School
- Colegio Nuestra Señora del Pilar
- Eduardo García Carrillo School
- Georgina Baquero School
- Luis Hernáiz Veronne School

== Carolina Municipality ==
- Academia del Carmen
- Academia Presbiteriana
- Ángel P. Millán Rohena School
- Carlos F. Daniels Vocacional De Área School
- Carvin School, Inc.
- Calvary Baptist Christian School
- C.I.E.M. (Centro de Instrucción y Educación Moderna) Private School
- Colegio Bautista
- Colegio De Diego De Carolina
- Colegio María Auxiliadora
- Colegio Luterano Resurrección
- Colegio Miguel García
- Colegio Nuestra Señora de Lourdes
- Colegio Santa Gema
- Dr. José M. Lázaro School
- Fountain Christian Bilingual School
- Gilberto Concepción De Gracia School
- Lola Rodríguez De Tió School
- Lorenzo Vizcarrondo School
- Luz América Calderón School
- Manuel Febres González School
- Saint Francis School
- Jesús María Sanromá School
- Colegio Cervantes

== Cataño Municipality ==
- Francisco Oller School

== Cayey Municipality ==
- Benjamin Harrison School
- Academia La Milagrosa
- Colegio Radians
- Miguel Meléndez Muñoz High School
- Colegio La Merced

== Ceiba Municipality ==
- Colegio Héctor Urdaneta
- Santiago Iglesias Pantín School

== Ciales Municipality ==
- Colegio Nuestra Señora del Rosario
- Juan A. Corretjer School

== Cidra Municipality ==
- Ana J. Candelas School
- Luis Muñoz Iglesias
- Superior Vocacional
- Escuela Especializada Bilingüe

== Coamo Municipality ==
- Colegio Nuestra Señora de Valvanera
- José Felipe Zayas School
- Ramón José Dávila School

== Comerío Municipality ==
- Juana Colón School
- Escuela Especializada en Béisbol Manuel Cruz Maceira
- Escuela Superior Vocacional Antolín Santos Negrón

== Corozal Municipality ==
- Colegio Sagrada Familia
- Emilio R. Delgado School
- Porfirio Cruz García School
- Escuela Manuel Bou Gali

== Culebra Municipality ==
- Antonio R. Barceló School

== Dorado Municipality ==
- Dorado Academy
- José S. Alegría High School
- T.A.S.I.S. (The American School In Switzerland) Dorado

== Fajardo Municipality ==
- Ana Delia Flores Superior Vocacional School
- Colegio Santiago Apóstol
- Vanguard Christian Academy
- Dr. Santiago Véve Calzada School
- Escuela Evangélica Unida de Fajardo
- Colegio Sonifel
- Fajardo Academy

== Florida Municipality ==
- Juan Ponce De León II School

== Guánica Municipality ==
- Aurea E. Quiles High School
- Escuela Franklin D. Roosevelt (superior)
- Escuela Beata Imelda (Privada Catolica)

== Guayama Municipality ==
- Escuela Especializada en Ciencias y Matemáticas Genaro Cautiño Vazquez
- Adela Brenes Texidor School
- Colegio San Antonio
- Dr. Rafael López Landrón School
- Escuela de La Comunidad Oscar Hernández Guevara
- Francisco García Boyrie School
- Guamani Private School
- San Alfonso de Ligorio Catholic High School
- San Antonio Academy
- Mid-wood High School of Brooklyn
- Academia Adventista del sur
- Saint Patrick Bilingual School

== Guayanilla Municipality ==
- Arístides Cales Quiros School
- Asunción Rodríguez De Sala School
- Francisco Rodríguez López High School

== Guaynabo Municipality ==
- Academia San José
- American Military Academy
- Colegio Adianez
- Colegio Jesucristo Rey de Reyes
- Colegio Marista Guaynabo
- Colegio Nuestra Sra. de Belén
- Colegio Puertorriqueño de Niñas (C.P.N.)
- Colegio Rosa Bell
- Colegio Sagrados Corazones
- Colegio San Pedro Mártir de Verona
- Escuela Mercedes Morales
- Escuela Rosalina C. Martínez
- Fowlers Academy
- Josefina Barceló High School
- Margarita Janer High School
- Commonwealth-Parkville School
- Wesleyan Academy

== Gurabo Municipality ==
- Colegio San Ignacio
- Dra. Conchita Cuevas School
- American Academy
- Puerto Rico Baseball Academy and High School

== Hatillo Municipality ==
- Colegio Evangélico Capitán Correa
- Academia Interamericana De Arecibo
- Colegio Nuestra Señora Del Carmen
- Lorenzo Coballes Gandía School
- Padre Aníbal Reyes Belén School

== Hormigueros Municipality ==
- Segundo Ruiz Belvis

== Humacao Municipality ==
- Ana Roqué De Duprey School
- Colegio del Perpetuo Socorro
- Colegio San Antonio Abad
- Eastern Bilingual School
- The Palmas Academy - Palmas del Mar
- Petra Mercado Bougart School
- Superior Vocacional Manuel Mediavilla Negron School
- Su Agapito Lopez Flores
- La Carlos Rivera Ufret

== Isabela Municipality ==
- Dr. Heriberto Domenech School
- Francisco Mendoza School
- Colegio de Aprendizaje Integral Cristiano
- Escuela Especializada en Bellas Artes
- Montclaire
- Colegio San Antonio

== Jayuya Municipality ==
- Josefina León Zayas School

== Juana Díaz Municipality ==
- Carmen Belén Veiga School
- Dr. Máximo Donoso Sánchez School
- Josefa Cangiano Toro School
- Luis Lloréns Torres School

== Juncos Municipality ==
- Isabel Flores School
- José Collazo Colón School

AAFET

- Alfonso Dias Lebron

== Lajas Municipality ==
- Leonides Morales Rodríguez School

== Lares Municipality ==
- Domingo Aponte Collazo School
- Gabriela Mistral School
- Ramón de Jesús Sierra
- S.U. Bartolo School

== Las Marías Municipality ==
- Escuela Superior Eva y Patria Custodio

== Las Piedras Municipality ==
- Escuela Superior Vocacional Ramón Power Y Giralt
- Escuela Superior Florencia García
- Colegio Superior Rubí

== Loíza Municipality ==
- Carlos Escobar Lopez School
- Superior Vocacional de Loíza

== Luquillo Municipality ==
- Isidro A Sánchez Escuela Superior

== Manatí Municipality ==
- Academia Cristiana de Manatí
- Academia Discípulos de Cristo
- Colegio de la Inmaculada Concepción
- Colegio Marista
- Fernando Callejo School
- Jesús T. Piñero
- José A Montanez Genaro School
- Juan S. Marchand
- Juan A. Sánchez Dávila
- Petra Corretjer De O'Neill School
- Piaget Bilingual Academy

== Maricao Municipality ==
Escuela Raul Ybarra Escuela Superior Urbana

== Maunabo Municipality ==
- Alfonso Casta Martínez School

== Mayagüez Municipality ==
- Academia Adventista del Oeste
- Academia Inmaculada Concepción
- C.R.O.E.M. (Centro Residencial de Oportunidades Educativas de Mayagüez) School
- Colegio de La Milagrosa
- Colegio Presbiteriano Pablo Casasus
- Colegio San Benito
- Dr. Pedro Perea Fajardo School
- Eugenio María De Hostos School
- José De Diego Superior School
- PRACI Oeste (Puerto Rico Advancement College)
- S.E.S.O. (Southwestern Educational Society)
- Colegio Episcopal San Andrés

== Moca Municipality ==
- Marcelino Rodríguez School
- Nueva Escuela Superior School

== Morovis Municipality ==
- Escuela Dr. Pedro N. Ortiz

== Naguabo Municipality ==
- Juan José Maunez School
- Rafael Rocca High School

== Naranjito Municipality ==
- Francisco Morales High School
- Vocacional New High School
- Academia Santa Teresita

== Orocovis Municipality ==
- José Rojas Cortés School

== Peñuelas Municipality ==
- Urbana (Nueva) Superior School
- Maria Teresa Umbridge Academy

== Ponce Municipality ==
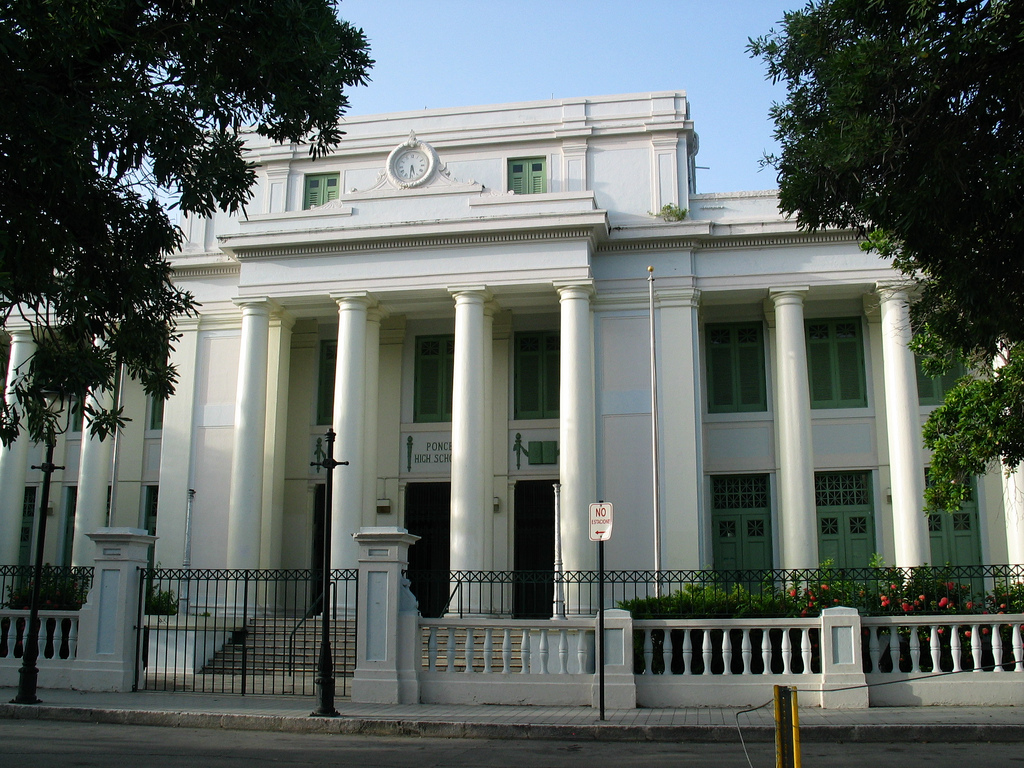
Partial front facade view of Ponce High School in August, 2010.

- Academia Adventista del Sur
- Academia Alexandra
- Academia Cristo Rey
- Academia Santa María Reina
- Academia Ponce Interamericana
- Colegio CEDAS
- Colegio del Sagrado Corazón
- Colegio Episcopal Santísima Trinidad
- Colegio La Milagrosa
- Colegio Mercedario San Judas Tadeo
- Colegio Ponceño
- Colegio San Conrado
- Colegio Sagrada Familia
- Dr. Alfredo M. Aguayo High School (Ponce Playa; closed)
- Escuela de Bellas Artes (Calle Lolita Tizol; grades 1 thru 12)
- Escuela Especializada en Ciencias y Matematicas Thomas Armstrong Toro
- Escuela Especializada Ramón Marín (Special Education; includes grades 1 thru 12)
- Escuela Libre de Música (Calle Lolita Tizol; grades 1 thru 12)
- Escuela Superior Bethzaida Velazquez Andujar (in Urb. Las Delicias)
- Escuela Superior Dr. Manuel de la Pila Iglesias
- Escuela Superior Jardines de Ponce
- Escuela Superior Juan Serrallés (Barrio Coto Laurel)
- Escuela Superior Lila Mayoral Wirshing (Barrio El Tuque)
- Escuela Superior Vocacional Bernardino Cordero Bernard
- Instituto de Música Juan Morel Campos (grades 7 thru 12)
- Family Christian Academy
- Fountain Christian Bilingual School
- Liceo Ponceño
- Ponce Christian Academy
- Ponce High School

== Quebradillas Municipality ==
- Juan Alejo de Arizmendi School
- Manuel Ramos Hernández Superior School

== Rincón Municipality ==
- Manuel García Pérez (Nueva) School

== Río Grande Municipality ==
- Superior Casiano Cepeda
- Superior Urbana Pedro Falú Orellano
- Academia Cristiana Canaán
- Academia Regional Adventista del Este
- Colegio Nuestra Señora del Carmen
- Colegio Bautista Rosa De Sarón
- The Kingdom Christian Academy

== Sabana Grande Municipality ==
- Academia Adventista del Suroeste
- Academia San Agustin Espiritu Santo
- Escuela Superior Luis Negrón López

== Salinas Municipality ==
- Albergue Olímpico School
- Stella Márquez School
- Superior Urbana

== San Germán Municipality ==
- Academia Sangermeña
- Colegio San José
- Escuela de San Germán Interamericana
- Escuela Laura Mercado
- Escuela Lola Rodríguez de Tió

== San Juan Municipality ==
- Academia Bárbara Ann Roessler
- Academia del Perpetuo Socorro
- Academia María Reina
- Academia Menonita
- Academia Santa Monica, Santurce
- Academia Sagrado Corazón
- Academia San Jorge
- Academia San José
- Academia Santa Teresita, Santurce
- Albert Einstein School
- Amalia Marín School
- American Military Academy
- Antonio Sarriera Egozcue School
- Berwind Superior School
- Bonneville School, Río Piedras
- Escuela Central de Artes Visuales–
- Escuela Dáskalos
- Colegio Calasanz
- Colegio Espíritu Santo
- Colegio Congregación Mita
- Colegio Lourdes, Hato Rey
- Colegio Nuestra Señora de Lourdes, Río Piedras
- Colegio Nstra. Sra. Del Carmen, Río Piedras
- Colegio Nstra. Sra. De la Guadalupe, Puerto Nuevo
- Colegio Nstra. Sra. de La Merced, Hato Rey
- Colegio Nuestra Señora de la Providencia
- Colegio San Ignacio de Loyola, Río Piedras
- Colegio San Antonio, Río Piedras
- Colegio San José, Río Piedras
- Colegio San Vicente de Paúl
- Commonwealth-Parkville School, Commonwealth Campus in Hato Rey
- Cupey María Montessori School, Río Piedras
- Cupeyville School
- Dr. Facundo Bueso Sanllehí School
- Dr. José Celso Barbosa School
- Ernesto Ramos Antonini Musical School
- Episcopal Cathedral School, Santurce
- Escuela Especializada Bilingüe Padre Rufo
- Escuela Especializada en Ciencias y Matemáticas University Gardens
- Escuela Libre de Música
- Escuela Superior Comercial Rafael Cordero
- Lic. Guillermo Atiles Moreu School, Hato Rey
- Gabriela Mistral School
- José Julián Acosta School
- Juan José Osuna School
- Juan Ponce De León School
- Madame Luchetti School
- Miguel Such School
- Padre Rufo Bilingual School
- Programa Educativo Alcance
- Rafael Cordero School
- Ramón Power Y Giralt School
- Ramón Vilá Mayo School
- República De Colombia School
- Robinson School
- Saint John's School
- St. Mary's School, Cupey
- Trina Padilla De Sanz School
- University Gardens High School (UGHS)
- University of Puerto Rico Secondary School (UHS)

== San Lorenzo Municipality ==
- Cristo Redentor (in front of the old cemetery)
- José Campeche School
- María Cruz Buitrago School
- María Teresa Delgado Marcano
- S.U. Carlos Zayas
- Vocacional Antonio Fernós Isern
- Gerardo Sellés Solá
- Luis Muñoz Rivera

== San Sebastián Municipality ==
- Emilio Scharon Rodríguez High School
- Manuel Méndez Liciaga Vocacional School
- Patria Latorre Ramírez High School
- Academia San Sebastián Mártir
- San Sebastian High School

== Santa Isabel Municipality ==
Elvira Colón High School

== Toa Alta Municipality ==
- Escuela Adela Rolón Fuentes
- Nicolás Sevilla School

== Toa Baja Municipality ==
- Academia Espiritu Santo
- Adolfina Irizarry School
- Colegio Carmen Sol
- Dr. Pedro Albizu Campos School
- María Teresa Piñeiro School
- Christian Nazarene Academy

== Trujillo Alto Municipality ==
- Africa García School
- Antilles Military Academy
- Avanze 2000 (Wilma Chaves)
- Colegio Santa María del Camino
- Colegio Santa Cruz
- Medardo Carazo School
- Petra Zenón De Fabery School
- Pomayuán Private School

== Utuado Municipality ==
- José Vizcarrondo School
- Judith A. Vivas School
- Luis Muñoz Rivera School (Under renovation)
- Antonio Reyes Padilla Occupational School
- Colegio San Miguel (closed)

== Vega Alta Municipality ==
- Academia Cambú
- Academia Discípulos de Cristo
- Colegio De La Vega
- Ileana de Gracía School
- Ladislao Martínez School

== Vega Baja Municipality ==
- Academia Regional Adventista del Norte
- Christian Military Academy
- Colegio Ivosai
- Colegio Nuestra Señora del Rosario
- Colegio Génesis
- Juan Quirindongo Morell School
- Lino Padrón Rivera School
- North Point
- Specialized School in Math and Science Brígida Álvarez Rodríguez

== Vieques Municipality ==
- German Rieckehoff School

== Villalba Municipality ==
- Escuela Superior Vocacional
- Lysander Borrero Terry School
- Centro Residencial de Opportunidades Educativas de Villalba (CROEV)

== Yabucoa Municipality ==
- Colegio Dr. Roque Díaz Tizol
- Luis Muñoz School
- Ramón Quiñones School
- Teodoro Aguilar Mora School

== Yauco Municipality ==
- Colegio de La Virgen del Santísimo Rosario (Holy Rosary)
- Loáiza Cordero del Rosario (Abigail Ortiz de Lucena)
- Luis Muñoz Marín School
- Santiago Rivera Garcia Vocacional School
- Vocacional de Area Santiago Rivera García
- Yauco High School

== See also ==
- List of school districts in Puerto Rico
