= Hide & Dance! =

2016 rhythm game

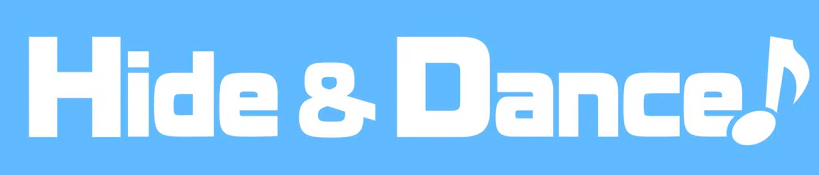
- The game's logo, which using an eighth note at the end of its title, rather than an exclamation point.
- Developer: hap inc.
- Publishers: hap inc. (mobile); Kemco (consoles)
- Designer: Yuusaku Ishimoto
- Programmer: Yuusaku Ishimoto
- Platforms: iOS; Android; Nintendo Switch; PlayStation 4
- Release: March 18, 2016: iOS, Android; WW: March 18, 2016 Nintendo Switch; WW: October 1, 2020 PlayStation 4; JP: September 30, 2020; WW: November 19, 2020
- Genre: Rhythm
- Modes: Single-player, multiplayer

Hide & Dance!, (Note: Japanese: 親フラリズム～うしろ！うしろ！～) originally released on mobile as Behind You!!, (Note: Japanese: うしろ！うしろ！) is a 2016 rhythm game developed and published by hap inc. for iOS and Android devices on March 18, 2016. The game was later ported to Nintendo Switch and PlayStation 4 by Kemco in late 2020. Designed and programmed by the founder of hap inc., Yuusaku Ishimoto, the game sees the player playing as a girl who attempts to dance in her room without being caught by her mother.

Hide & Dance! was received positively by critics; GameZebo called it a "slight but hugely endearing rhythm action title". According to its official website, the game has been downloaded over 2.5 million times on mobile devices.

== Gameplay ==
The player playing as the girl while dancing to the song "Smile Girl"

In Hide & Dance!'s main mode, players primarily play as a girl and must press buttons in accordance to the ones displayed on the screen in order to dance. While dancing, the girl's mother will occasionally enter the room and result in a game over if the player continues dancing. To avoid the game over, players must stop dancing when the mother enters the room. The game features 10 different songs the player can dance to, with each song having 3 different difficulty settings. After clearing songs, players receive in-game coins, which can be used in a gashapon machine to unlock new songs and characters to play as. The game has a multiplayer mode, which supports up to two players.

== Development and release ==
Hide & Dance! was developed by the independent Japanese video game developer hap inc., consisting solely of its founder, the Tokyo-based Yuusaku Ishimoto. Hide & Dance! has a similar art style to other hap inc. games. The game's characters are modelled after Ishimoto's childhood and appear in many other hap inc. titles, most notably Mom Hid My Game!.

The game was released on iOS and Android devices on March 18, 2018. Some of the game's characters were released as stickers for use in messaging systems on iOS devices by the Line Corporation in December 2019.

The game's Nintendo Switch and PlayStation 4 ports were localized and published by Kemco, who had previously ported hap inc.'s prior title, Mom Hid My Game!, to the same consoles. The ports were first unveiled by Kemco at the 2020 Tokyo Game Show. The PlayStation 4 port was released on September 30, 2020, in Japan, with a worldwide release following on November 19. The Nintendo Switch port was released worldwide on October 1.

== Reception ==
Reception

Review scores
Publication	Score
Gamezebo	4/5
Pure Nintendo	7/10

Hide & Dance! was generally praised by critics, being rated 4/5 by GameZebo and 7/10 by Pure Nintendo. Maria Alexander of GameZebo described the game as a "slight but hugely endearing rhythm action title"; Pure Nintendo's Trevour Gould described it as "short on gameplay but big on smiles" and also thought that it's more fun to watch other people play the game than playing it oneself. Masanori Mokudai covered the mobile releases in an article for 4Gamer.net, in which he described it as "surprisingly solid".

Maria Alexander of GameZebo praised the game's controls as "intuitive." Alexander thought that the "hiding" mechanic was "confusing" at first, but stated that it soon became "second nature." Gould stated that it's "hard not to crack a smile" while watching other people play the game. Gould also compared the game to the rhythm video game series Dance Dance Revolution, while Alexander compared it to Nintendo's WarioWare series.

The soundtrack was received positively by critics, with Pure Nintendo calling them "hooky", albeit short; GameZebo noted the songs' shortness as one of the worst aspects of the game, while still describing them as "sweet."
