= Dante Disparte =

Dante Disparte is an American business executive, security advisor, and author. He is currently Vice Chairman, Strategy and Global Affairs at Circle Internet Group. Until 2021, he was deputy chairman of the Libra Association, a Facebook-led cryptocurrency project. At Libra he was also chief strategy officer and an executive vice president. He founded the firm Risk Cooperative in 2014.

He was previously chairman of the American Security Project's Business Council for American Security, a member of FEMA's National Advisory Council, and is currently a member of the Council on Foreign Relations, The Atlantic Council, the American Security Project, and the Risk Cooperative where he serves as chairman.

== Early life and education ==
Dante Alighieri Disparte was born in Puerto Rico, where he and his family lived through Hurricane Hugo in 1989. Disparte, who speaks six languages, graduated from the Commonwealth-Parkville School in Guaynabo, Puerto Rico in 1996.

In 2000, Disparte graduated from Goucher College in Maryland with a B.A. in international and intercultural studies. In 2014, he graduated from NYU Stern with an MSc in risk management. He also graduated from the leadership and development program Harvard Business School.

== Career ==
Early in his career, Disparte was a managing director at Clements Worldwide, an insurance brokerage. In 2013 he joined the American Security Project, a think tank founded by John Kerry and Chuck Hagel. In 2014, he founded Risk Cooperative, a capital management firm based in Washington, DC. With Disparte as CEO, by 2018 the firm was operating as an insurer broker and developing programs backed by Lloyd's of London. Bloomberg at the time described Disparte as a "grid resiliency and security expert." In April 2018, Risk Cooperative was selected by Beazley to build a blockchain-based registry for insurance. Power Ledger, a blockchain technology company, hired Disparte in May 2018 to lead its efforts to restore the power grid in Puerto Rico after Hurricane Irma and Hurricane Maria.

Disparte was involved in the Libra Association, a blockchain group supported by Facebook. Weeks before the project's public announcement in June 2019, he was named the Libra Association's head of policy and communications. After the announcement, the Libra Association's proposed stablecoin faced a "beating from politicians" on issues such as potentially undermining local currencies. The backlash led to a ban in Europe, and in early October 2019, Paypal, one of 28 founding members, dropped from the association, followed by others such as eBay and Visa. After the exodus, on October 14, 2019, Disparte was elected deputy chairperson of the Libra Council, which governs the association. While retaining his role as head of policy and communications, he was also named an executive vice president. Under Disparte, the association began redesigning the digital coin to "appease skeptical regulators."

After being renamed the Diem Association, the project was ready to test its Diem stablecoin in the spring of 2021, and on the brink of approval from the Swiss Financial Market Supervisory Authority (Finma). However, the final approval needed by the US Treasury was refused, with the Biden administration requesting a delay to examine the project further. Writes The Financial Times, Disparte "quit in frustration," and the Diem project was cancelled in January 2022. In a move that American Banker called "a loss for Diem," in April 2021, he was hired as chief strategy officer and head of global policy at Circle Internet Group, a stablecoin company. After speaking at a US Senate committee on stablecoins in December 2021, he spoke before the US House Committee on Financial Services about stablecoin regulation in April 2023.

== Writing and Public Speaking ==
In 2016, Disparte co-authored Global Risk Agility and Decision Making: Organizational Resilience in the Era of Man-Made Risk, which was published through Palgrave Macmillan. He has been interviewed by media outlets such as CNBC's Closing Bell, NPR, and Bloomberg Television on issues such as stablecoin regulation. He has also authored articles for publications such as American Banker, Harvard Business Review and World Economic Forum, and was a speaker at the Milken Institute's Global Conference in 2025.

== Boards and Committees ==
As of 2026, Disparte is a member of the Council on Foreign Relations, a board director of The Atlantic Council, and a board member of the Economic Club of Washington, D.C. He is also a current Member and Contributor at Bretton Woods Committee. Disparte contributes as a Senior Advisor for the Diplomatic Courier Advisory Board, where he received the inaugural Envoy Award in 2026. He has been an ex-officio director of the American Security Project and chairman of the Risk Cooperative.

Disparte was also previously chairman of the American Security Project's Business Council for American Security, and served on the board of Kjaer Group in Denmark. He was a member of FEMA's National Advisory Council, before the entirety of the council was dismissed in early 2025 by the Trump administration.

He was an alumni leader and on the alumni board at Harvard Business School. For the Harvard Business School Club of Washington, D.C., Disparte was a member, president (2012 - 2014), and chairman. Disparte was also formerly a board member at Communities in Schools, DC, and an advisor to the College Success Foundation.

== Congressional Testimony (United States) ==
1. U.S. Senate Banking Committee

In December 2021, representing Circle as Chief Strategy Officer and Head of Global Policy, Disparte testified before the U.S. Senate Committee on Banking, Housing, and Urban Affairs regarding the operational risks, market transparency, and regulation of stablecoins. In his testimony, Disparte argued that private-sector digital dollar innovations operating within the U.S. regulatory perimeter support domestic economic competitiveness, and noted potential applications for blockchain-based systems in domestic remittances and corruption-resistant humanitarian aid delivery.

2. U.S. House Financial Services Committee

In April 2023, Disparte testified before the United States House Committee On Financial Services on Digital Assets, Financial Technology, and Inclusion. His appearance centered on proposed stablecoin payment legislation, where he addressed consumer protection guidelines, digital dollar reserve transparency, and the financial infrastructure requirements necessary to safeguard national security.

3. U.S. House Foreign Affairs Committee

In April 2021, testifying as the founder and chairman of Risk Cooperative, Disparte appeared before the U.S. House Foreign Affairs Subcommittee on Africa, Global Health, and Global Human Rights during a hearing on the structural and economic effects of climate change in Africa. His testimony highlighted the continent's insurance protection gap, global health vulnerabilities, and the national security implications of climate-induced mass migration.

== Parliamentary Evidence (United Kingdom) ==
In March 2026, Disparte provided oral and written evidence to the UK House of Lords Financial Services Regulation Committee during its inquiry into stablecoin framework proposals. His testimony evaluated the policy design, asset reserve parameters, and systemic implications of central bank digital currencies (CBDCs) alongside traditional sterling-denominated banking rails.

== Summary of Legislative Appearances ==
Date	Body / Committee	Topic	Record / Document Link
April 27, 2021	U.S. House Foreign Affairs Subcommittee	Climate Change in Africa	Written Testimony
December 14, 2021	U.S. Senate Banking Committee	Stablecoins & Digital Assets	C-SPAN Video / Transcript
April 19, 2023	U.S. House Financial Services Subcommittee	Stablecoin Legislation	Committee Record
March 18, 2026	UK House of Lords Financial Services Committee	Central Bank Digital Currencies & Stablecoins	Oral Evidence

== Publishing History ==
Climate Change: The Insights You Need from Harvard Business Review, foreword by Dante Disparte, September 22, 2020

"If You Think Fighting Climate Change Will Be Expensive, Calculate the Cost of Letting It Happen", by Dante Disparte, June 12, 2017, Harvard Business Review

"The Best Cybersecurity Investment You Can Make Is Better Training", by Dante Disparte and Chris Furlow, May 16, 2017, Harvard Business Review

Global Risk Agility and Decision Making: Organizational Resilience in the Era of Man-Made Risk, by Dante Disparte and Daniel Wagner, September 20, 2016.

== Personal life ==
Disparte and his wife Amal Disparte graduated together from Goucher College in 2000, and live in Washington, DC. Amal founded the GrandEd Foundation, which gives public school teachers in DC "rapid microgrants."
