= Exodus Wallet =

Cryptocurrency application

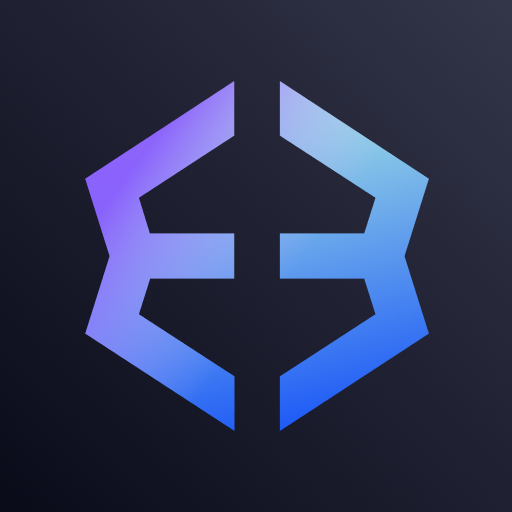
- Logo of Exodus Wallet
- Original author: JP Richardson
- Developer: Exodus Movement Inc
- Website: www.exodus.com

Exodus is a cryptocurrency wallet available on desktop and mobile platforms. It was founded in 2015 by JP Richardson and Daniel Castagnoli. Exodus wallet supports digital assets including Bitcoin, Ethereum, and Solana. It is available on Windows, macOS, Linux, iOS, Android, and as a browser extension.

The wallet supports hardware-wallet integration (via a physical device often resembling a USB to store cryptocurrency and private keys).

== History ==
Exodus was founded in 2015 by JP Richardson and Daniel Castagnoli. In April 2021, the company raised $60 million in equity tokenization (digital tokens representing actual shares) offering, becoming the first company to do a crypto-only public equity offering. The company is publicly traded on the NYSE American under the ticker EXOD and in June 2025 held a corporate treasury including Bitcoin, Ethereum, and SOL.

It allows staking for select tokens (locking digital tokens including ETH, MATIC, SOL, APT, AXL, to earn rewards), NFT management, and fiat (government-backed currency) on‑off ramps via partnerships. It supports altcoins including Aragon, EOS, and Golem.

In March 2025, President Donald Trump invited Richardson to a summit of cryptocurrency executives at the White House, leading to increased attention for the company.
