= Silvergate Bank =

American bank

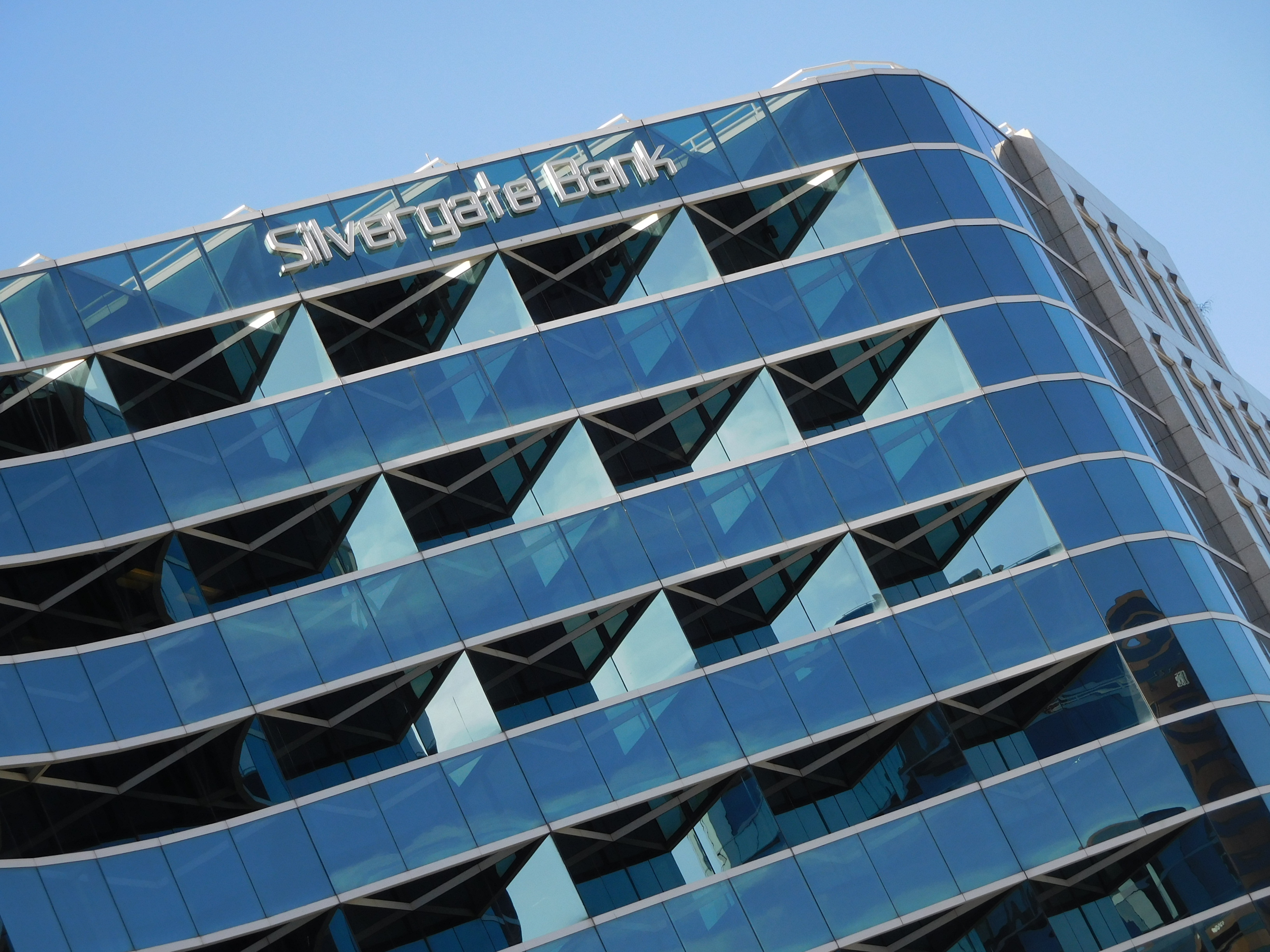
- Silvergate's San Diego office in 2019
- Company type: Public
- Traded as: Expert Market: SICPQ
- Industry: Financial services; Cryptocurrency
- Founded: 1988; 38 years ago; 1996; 30 years ago (as a bank)
- Founders: Dennis Frank and Derek J. Eisle (1996 re-capitalization)
- Defunct: 2023 (announced winding down)
- Fate: Voluntary liquidation in Chapter 11 bankruptcy
- Headquarters: La Jolla, San Diego, California, U.S.
- Area served: Worldwide
- Key people: Alan Lane (CEO); Ben Reynolds (president)
- Products: Banking
- Website: silvergate.com

Silvergate Bank was a California bank founded in 1988. The company began providing services for cryptocurrency users in 2016, and conducted an IPO in 2019.

In 2021, Silvergate initiated efforts to launch its own U.S. dollar-backed stablecoin, acquiring Meta's Diem technology in January, 2022 for around $200 million to assist with this (Silvergate had previously intended to serve as a key issuer of the Diem currency for Meta).

In November 2022, concerns were raised about Silvergate's health, after a fall in cryptocurrency prices and the bankruptcy of FTX. In March 2023, the bank announced plans to wind down and liquidate. Its failure was one of the first in the 2023 United States banking crisis.

== History ==
=== Foundation and growth ===
Silvergate Bank was founded as a savings and loan association. Silvergate became a California-chartered bank in 1988. In 1996, it was re-capitalized and reorganized into a bank by Dennis Frank and Derek J. Eisele, but it initially remained a three-branch community bank in the San Diego region.

In 2013, CEO Alan Lane personally invested in Bitcoin; the company launched an initiative to start serving cryptocurrency clients in 2016. After this, the bank grew rapidly, reaching $1.9 billion in assets and 250 clients by 2017. The company conducted an IPO in November 2019 at a share price of $13, and by November 2021 the price had risen by 1,580% to $219 due to the cryptocurrency bubble at the time.

=== Silvergate Exchange Network ===
The bank operated a real-time payments system called the "Silvergate Exchange Network" (SEN), which enabled cryptocurrency exchanges, institutions, and customers to exchange fiat currencies such as US dollars and euros. Silvergate was probably the first regulated bank to develop this sort of payment system. By the third quarter of 2022 it had $12 billion in deposits from 1,677 "Silvergate Exchange Network" (SEN) customers including all major cryptocurrency exchanges and over 1,000 institutional investors.

=== Stablecoin involvement and Diem acquisition ===
In June 2019, Facebook created the Libra Association, a blockchain group aiming to launch a stablecoin. Based in Switzerland, it soon ran into regulatory hurdles, and in 2020 it rebranded as Diem. It was ready to test its Diem stablecoin in the spring of 2021, and on the brink of approval from the Swiss Financial Market Supervisory Authority (Finma). However, the final approval needed by the US Treasury was refused, with the Biden administration requesting a delay to examine the project further. Writes The Financial Times, Libra's head of policy, Dante Disparte "quit in frustration." Under Diem CEO Stuart Levey, the project was then relocated from Switzerland to the US, and began working with Silvergate to issue the currency. At the time, Silvergate was a bank partner of Coinbase and four stablecoins backed by US dollars: Paxos, Circle, Gemini, and TrustToken.

Silvergate Bank partnered with the Diem Association in May 2021 to launch their stablecoin, with Silvergate to be issuer and reserve manager. The Fed and Treasury were informed a launch was scheduled for June 29, 2021. The night beforehand, the US withheld approval. Subsequently, Levey's attempts to schedule meetings with Treasury officials were ignored. The Diem project was cancelled in January 2022, and that month, Silvergate bought Diem's remaining assets to "pursue its own stablecoin plans." Silvergate Capital, Silvergate Bank's holding company, purchased Diem's technology assets on January 31, 2022 for $182 million. At the time, Silvergate CEO was Alan Lane. As of late 2022, the stablecoin had not yet launched. Barron's reported that Silvergate's shares surged after buying the assets from Diem. By the start of 2023, however, the bank announced it had shelved any plan to launch its own stablecoin, and had recorded a $196 million loss related to its write-off of Diem assets.

=== FTX exposure, drop in liquidity, and winding down ===
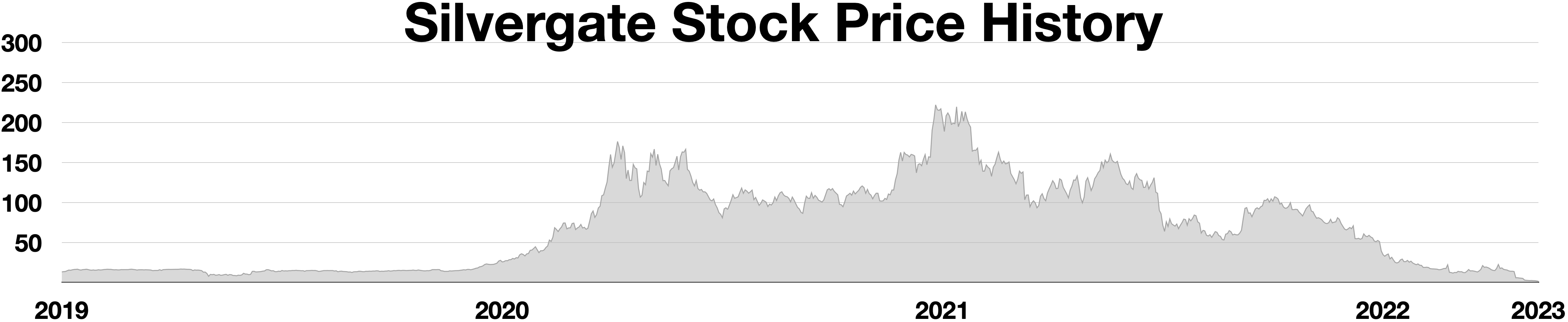
Silvergate stock price history

In March 2022, Silvergate invested in a $200 million fundraising round for Aptos, a cryptocurrency startup founded by ex-Diem employees. In the first part of 2022, Silvergate made a $205 million loan to the analytics software company Microstrategy, which used the funds to buy bitcoin. By November 2022, the bank was led by Lane as CEO and Ben Reynolds as president, while Eisele remained in the leadership as chief credit officer.

In late 2022—following a fall in cryptocurrency prices and the collapse of many cryptocurrency exchanges and schemes such as FTX—concerns were raised about potential effects on Silvergate due to loss of deposits and credit exposure from SEN leverage, as well as potential ramifications of issues for the wider cryptocurrency ecosystem due to Silvergate's key role in it. Some short sellers raised the prospect of a bank run. The share price of Silvergate had fallen 89% from its November 2021 all-time-high to $25 by 5 December 2022, and its deposits fell to $9.8 billion. Silvergate reported in November 2022 that it had adequate liquidity, that it only held FTX deposits, and that it was not exposed to FTX via lending. Senators Elizabeth Warren, Roger Marshall, and John Kennedy requested that the bank explain its relationship to FTX in December 2022. By December 2022 deposits at Silvergate had fallen to $3.8 billion.

=== Liquidation ===
On March 8, 2023, it was announced that Silvergate Bank would wind down its operations and liquidate. After the liquidation, Silvergate did repay its advances, selling investment securities to do so. As of November 2023, all deposits had been repaid, with banking operations ceasing shortly after that. CNBC later noted that Silvergate Capital, the owner of the bank, had after 2023 stated that despite the bank run, its operations had "stabilized" and it had the "capability to continue to serve its customers," and said its insolvency was the result of "increased supervisory pressure" on Silvergate and other similar crypto-asset businesses.

=== Investigations and settlements ===
The Federal Reserve Board and California Department of Financial Protection and Innovation (DFPI) on July 1, 2024, stated that its joint investigation against Silvergate had found deficiencies in the bank's internal transaction monitoring, and Silvergate would be paying out a combined $63 million in penalties to the agencies. An SEC penalty was levied separately from the $63 million, and also on July 1, the SEC announced it had charged Silvergate Capital Corporation for allegedly misleading investors about the strength of its anti-money laundering compliance program, noting it had failed to detect what the SEC called "nearly $9 billion in suspicious transfers among FTX and its related entities." Silvergate settled without admitting to or denying the allegations, paying $50 million to the SEC. Silvergate stated the settlement concluded investigations by the Federal Reserve, DFPI, and SEC. According to Reuters, the $50 million assessed by the SEC was offset by the payments to the Fed and DFPI. Also, Silvergate said it was surrendering its bank charter.

On September 18, 2024, Silvergate Capital filed for Chapter 11 bankruptcy protection, listing assets between $100 million and $500 million and liabilities between $10 million and $50 million. In April 2025, the Wall Street Journal reported that following a request from an activist shareholders, an examiner had been appointed to look into an investigation conducted by a director, concluding it had been tainted by the use of the company's own law firm.
