= Flooz.com =

Former internet payment service

- Type: Corporation (closed)
- Industry: Internet payments
- Founded: February 1999; 27 years ago in New York City
- Defunct: August 26, 2001
- Headquarters: New York City
- Products: Flooz
- Website: flooz.com (web archive)

Flooz.com was a dot-com venture, now defunct, based in New York City that went online in February 1999. It was promoted by comic actress Whoopi Goldberg in a series of television advertisements. Started by iVillage co-founder Robert Levitan, the company attempted to establish a currency unique to Internet merchants, somewhat similar in concept to airline frequent flyer programs or grocery store stamp books. The name "flooz" was based upon the Arabic word for money, فلوس, fuloos. Users accumulated flooz credits either as a promotional bonus given away by some internet businesses or purchased directly from flooz.com which then could be redeemed for merchandise at a variety of participating online stores. Adoption of flooz by both merchants and customers proved limited, and it never established itself as a widely recognized medium of exchange, which hindered both its usefulness and appeal.

== Use by crime syndicate ==
In 2001, Flooz.com was notified by the Federal Bureau of Investigation that a Russian-Filipino organized crime syndicate used $300,000 worth of Flooz and stolen credit card numbers as part of a money-laundering scheme, in which stolen credit cards were used to purchase currency and then redeemed. Levitan has stated that fraudulent purchases accounted for 19% of consumer credit card transactions by mid-2001.

== Closure ==
The company announced its closure on August 26, 2001, perceived as an early indicator of the growing dot-com bubble burst. Upon the company's closing, all unused flooz credits became worthless and nonrefundable. Over its short history, flooz.com reportedly exhausted from $35 million to $50 million in venture capital. The company's bankruptcy was cited as having approximately 325,000 creditors.

== See also ==
- Beenz.com
- Digital currency
- InternetCash.com
- Virtual currency
- Diem (digital currency)
