= Beenz.com =

Defunct website

- Industry: Online commerce
- Founded: 1998
- Founder: Charles Cohen
- Defunct: 2001
- Fate: Sold to Carlson Marketing Group
- Headquarters: London
- Website: beenz.com at the Wayback Machine (archived 2000-05-11)

beenz.com was a website that allowed consumers to earn beenz, a type of online currency, for performing activities such as visiting a web site, shopping online, or logging on through an Internet service provider. The beenz e-currency could then be spent with participating online merchants.

The marketing and brand concept positioned Beenz as "universal, incentive-based currency for online merchants… a globally acceptable alternative to money that would influence and reward on-line consumer behavior". The Beenz management team raised almost $100 million from venture capitalists including Apax Patricof, Larry Ellison of Oracle, Michael Saylor of Microstrategy, François Pinault of PPR, Vivendi Universal, Italian financier Carlo de Benedetti and Hikari Tsushin of Japan.

Since launching a new currency is illegal in many countries, beenz management and its legal teams had to meet with finance ministers across Europe to assure them that Beenz would be categorized as virtual points. Beenz's offices in London were visited by the Financial Services Authority (FSA) on suspicion of operating an unlicensed bank.

Beenz operated in the United States, Sweden, France, Germany, Italy, Japan, Singapore, Australia, and China. At its peak, there were offices in 15 countries, and translations of the beenz website into several languages.

After the dot-com bubble burst, the company replaced its CEO, Philip Letts, with a team including the founder, Charles Cohen, and other Board directors Stephen Limpe, Don McGuire, and Sean Lane. The company could not go public, further funding did not materialise, and the company was sold to US-based Carlson Marketing Group in 2001 for an undisclosed sum.

Carlson planned to integrate the beenz system into the customer relationship management tools they offered to clients. After the sale of the company to Carlson, beenz account holders were given a period of time to redeem their beenz before it became integrated. Competitors like Amazon, who, along with Visa, built systems allowing direct online payments via debit or credit cards, meant many of Beenz's clients moved to these new platforms, and Beenz eventually lost most of its clients.

Carlson did not renew the domain name. In June 2008, CNET counted Beenz among the greatest dotcom disasters.

== Partnerships ==
One of the company's partnerships was with MasterCard, enabling holders of the "rewardz card" to transfer earned beenz to their credit card account. This was one of the first relationships of its kind between a traditional finance company and a dot-com enterprise.

== Founders ==
The inventor of Beenz was Charles Cohen, from the UK. He co-founded the parent company and joined forces with former reality television star Neil Forrester, whom Cohen had met whilst the pair were students at Oxford University. After tossing around the idea of Beenz and trying to get it off the ground Charles joined forces with Dave King, John Hogg, and Philip Letts to take Beenz forward. They quickly divided roles - Charles would take on the tasks of website development, becoming CTO, Dave was Head of Sales, Philip became CEO, and John Hogg headed Marketing. Philip took on Nicolas De Santis to develop the much-vaunted Beenz logo and brand vision. After an intensive period of fundraising, Beenz launched with a guerrilla marketing campaign designed by the crew and Nick Band of Band and Brown. John Hogg moved over, and De Santis became Chief Marketing Officer. Letts led Beenz to raise nearly 100 million dollars and spearheaded the expansion worldwide. He moved the head office to New York from London and brought on Philippe Cothier as European president, Mitch Feigen as US president, and opened an Asian division.

Letts left Beenz after closing the last big round of over 30 million and went on to run Tradaq.com, a business-to-business exchange that allowed companies to buy and sell products and services without using cash.

De Santis left a few months after that and became the Chief Marketing Officer of Opodo.

Cohen used his experience with Beenz.com to write a book in 2002 called Corporate Vices: What's Gone Wrong With Business (ISBN 978-1-84112-435-3). He now runs Probability plc in the UK, a mobile gambling business that he co-founded in 2004. Before beenz, Cohen worked with Thought Interactive (a web design business). Initially, the concept was heavily dependent on the English-speaking world. To change that, the company recruited such characters as the Swedish entrepreneur Mikael Karlmark to launch its first non-English subsidiary.

== Business model ==
The beenz business model was based upon arbitrage. Companies purchased beenz from the company at a locally determined exchange rate. They could then award these to consumers for actions to which the issuer attached value, such as making online purchases. Beenz were collected by the user clicking on a Java Applet and entering their email address linked to a beenz account. Consumers were then able to use their beenz to purchase goods from online merchants. Each merchant was free to exchange beenz at any notional value they liked, the company assuming that the market would settle the exchange value of each beenz. Merchants were then able to sell beenz back to the company itself at a predefined exchange rate. The company made its margin on the spread between the sell and the buy price of beenz in the market. In the later stages, a professional economist was employed to model the behaviour of prices and flows of money in this micro-economy, and keep it healthy.

Cohen's stated long-term aim was eventually to allow consumers to purchase beenz directly from the company and for the "beenz economy" to eventually resemble that of a real economy. However, at the time, this was fraught with difficulty, as some countries (such as France) expressed a view that such alternative currency schemes were undesirable and that they would seek to prevent them from operating.

In 1999, a million beenz were given away by accident as a vendor mistakenly offered 100,000 beenz (worth $1,000) for an action. Beenz took them back after a software fraud monitor triggered when 1.5 million beenz were given out.

== See also ==
- Bitcoin
- Digital currency
- Electronic money
- Flooz.com
- InternetCash.com
- Virtual currency
- Shadow bank
