= Hap Inc. =

Japanese video game developer

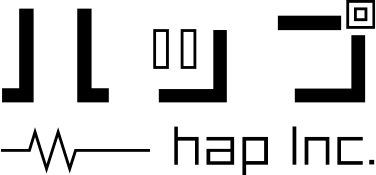
- Native name: 株式会社ハップ
- Romanized name: Kabushiki gaisha Happu
- Industry: Video games; mobile apps
- Founded: March 6, 2007; 19 years ago
- Headquarters: Yoyogi, Shibuya, Tokyo, Japan
- Area served: Worldwide
- Key people: Yūsaku Ishimoto (founder and sole employee)
- Brands: Mom Hid My Game!, others
- Number of employees: 1 (2015)
- Website: app.hap.ne.jp

Hap Inc. (株式会社ハップ, Kabushiki gaisha Happu; 'Hap' short for 'happy') is an independent Japanese video game developer best known for the Mom Hid My Game! series. The company is well-known for its "poorly" English-translated titles.

== History ==
hap inc. released their first game, 10 Dice, on July 3, 2012, an app where the user rolled dice. On August 8, 2016, hap inc. released Mom Hid My Game! for the iOS and Android, which would be the first installment in the series with the same name. Later on January 3, 2017, a sequel to Mom Hid My Game! was released, titled Hidden my game by mom 2, and a third installment, Hidden my game by mom 3, was later released on July 17, 2018.

== Products ==
- 10 Dice - 2012
- Handris! - 2013
- Crazy Freekick - 2014
- Crazy Pitcher - 2014
- Toast Girl - 2014
- Crazy Horizontal bar - 2014
- Crazy Batting Center - 2015
- Vice captain - 2015
- Nyardle - 2015
- Hide & Dance! - 2016
- Mom Hid My Game! - 2016
- Mom Hid My Game! 2 - 2017
- My brother ate my pudding - 2017
- Tokimeter - 2017
- Hidden my game by mom 3 - 2018
- Mr Success - 2018
- Home Runtaro - 2019
- Home Fighter - 2020
- Hidden my game by mom 4 - 2020
- Mominesweeper- 2022
- Tokyo Game Brain - 2022
- Who Is It - 2023
- Hidden my game by mom 5 - 2025
