= Facebook Credits =

Virtual currency used on Facebook

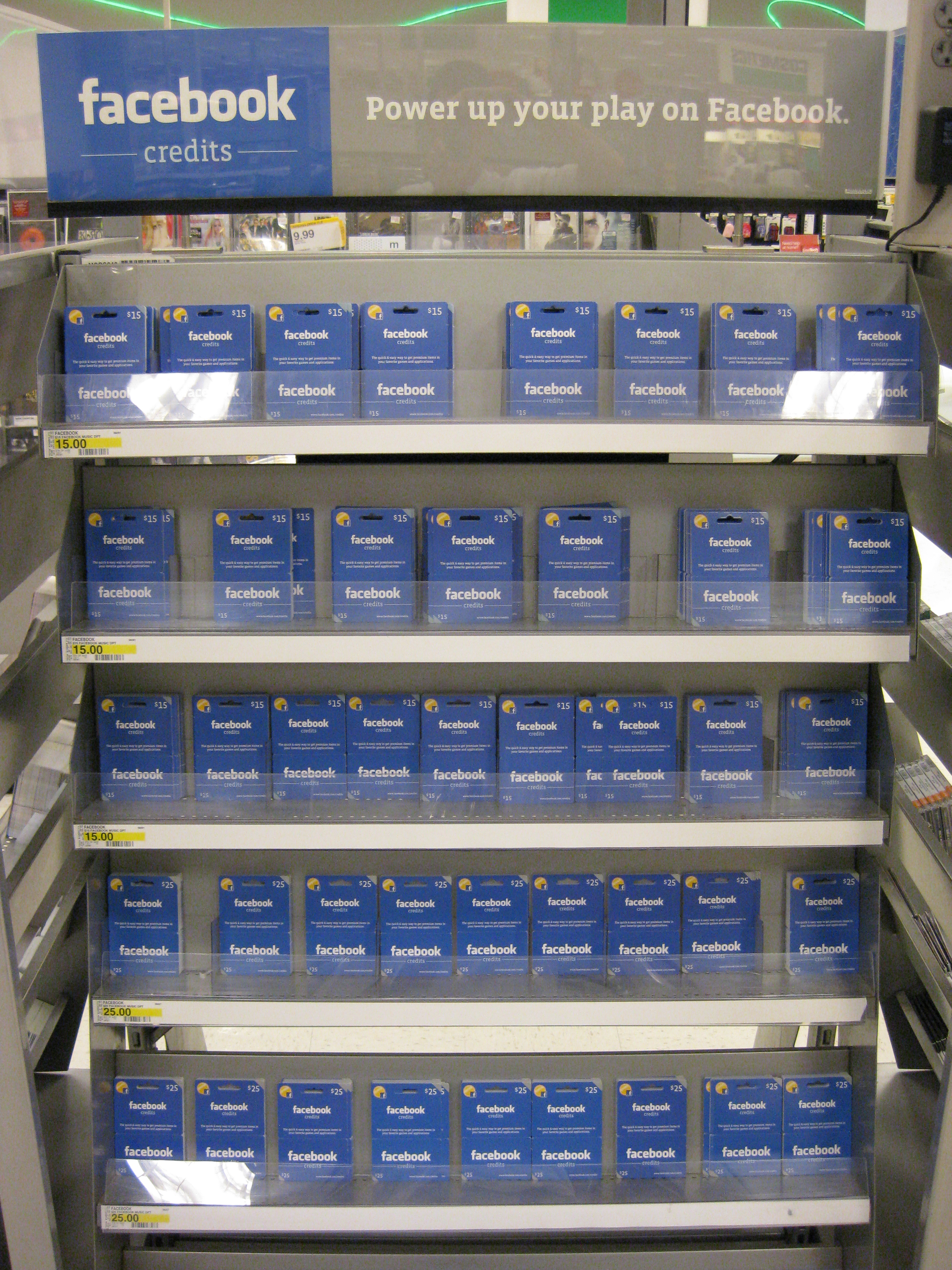
Facebook Credits for sale at a Target store in Colorado Springs, September 2010

Facebook Credits was a virtual currency that enabled people to purchase items in games and non-gaming applications on the Facebook Platform. One U.S. dollar was the equivalent of 10 Facebook Credits. Facebook Credits were available in 15 currencies including U.S. dollars, pound sterling, euros, and Danish kroner. Facebook was hoping eventually to expand Credits into a micropayment system open to any Facebook application, whether a game or a media company application. Facebook deprecated Credits in favour of users' local currencies.

Facebook Credits went into its alpha stage in May 2009 and progressed into the beta stage in February 2010, which ended in January 2011. At that time, Facebook announced all Facebook game developers would be required to process payments only through Facebook Credits from July 1, 2011.

Facebook retains 30% and developers get 70% of all revenue earned through Credits. Credits is a single currency that can be used in multiple games and applications, and its introduction led former PayPal executives to comment on whether or not Credits could soon replace PayPal as the leader in virtual payments. By the end of 2010, it was expected that Facebook users would purchase Credits to pay for the majority of virtual goods sold on the social network.

In March 2011, Facebook created an official subsidiary to handle payments: Facebook Payments Inc.

In June 2012, Facebook announced it would no longer use its own money system, Facebook Credits. Users with credits will see them converted into their own currencies. Facebook Credits was officially removed from Facebook in September 2013.

== Implementation ==
Over 150 developers used Facebook Credits in more than 650 Facebook games and applications, which represented over 70% of virtual goods purchased on Facebook. Developers who offered Facebook Credits include Zynga (FarmVille, FrontierVille), CrowdStar (Happy Aquarium, HelloCity), and PopCap Games (Bejeweled Blitz) as well as Playdom, Playfish, RockYou, and 6waves.

In September 2010, it was announced that Facebook Credits would become the exclusive payment method for all Zynga-developed games hosted on Facebook. Zynga is the number one Facebook application developer and was expected to earn $500 million in 2010 from virtual goods.

It was announced in April 2011 that Facebook users would be able to use Credits to purchase vouchers redeemable for real goods and services through the "Deals" offering.

== Obtaining Credits ==
In addition to purchasing Facebook Credits directly, there were several online and offline channels for earning or buying them.

- Gift cards — In the U.S., Target, Walmart, Best Buy, Radio Shack, GameStop, and Safeway sold Facebook credit gift cards in their stores. Facebook Credits gift cards were sold in Tesco and Game shops in the U.K. Facebook Credits gift cards were also sold in over 500,000 outlets in five Southeast Asian countries, India, Australia, and New Zealand.
- Rixty let users get Facebook Credits by buying a prepaid Rixty giftcard with coins or cash at stores and then converting it to Facebook Credits.
- shopkick allowed users to earn Facebook Credits by checking into stores with an iPhone or Android application.
- ifeelgoods enabled online retailers to offer Facebook Credits as incentives for making purchases, signing up for e-mail newsletters, and other actions.
- AppDog awarded users with an Apple or Android mobile device with free Facebook Credits in exchange for downloading apps. Downloaded apps can be free or paid.
- (TrialPay) issued Facebook Credits as an incentive for users to sign up for advertiser services (i.e. sign-up for a Netflix account), complete market research surveys or interact with brand-sponsored videos/engagements. Users could access TrialPay on the Facebook platform through a variety of ways including in-game icons DealSpot or an 'Earn Credits' tab within the game environment.

== Regulations ==
In March 2013, FinCen announced new guidance relating to the regulation of virtual currencies such as Facebook Credits and bitcoin These regulations will have an impact of those who deal in virtual currencies and is seen as FinCen's first step towards regulating virtual currency (as opposed to Fiat money.) As regulation of such currencies expands, individual U.S. citizens may be required to report substantial holdings of these currencies on their tax returns.

== See also ==
- Diem (digital currency)
- Digital currency
- Token money
