= Layer-1 blockchain =

Base protocol of a blockchain network

Layer-1 blockchain refers to the base protocol of a blockchain network that operates independently and can process and finalize cryptocurrency transactions without relying on another blockchain.

Bitcoin was the first Layer-1 blockchain. Others, such as Ethereum, Solana, and Sui, emerged to support more complex decentralized interactions through smart contracts and decentralized applications (dApps).

Layer-1 blockchains differ from Layer-2 solutions, which are secondary protocols built on top of Layer-1 networks to enhance scalability and transaction speeds.
