= University Gardens High School =

Magnet secondary school in San Juan, Puerto Rico

Coordinates: 18.4056°N 66.0659°W

- Spanish: Escuela Superior University Gardens
- Hato Rey Sur, San Juan, Puerto Rico; United States

University Gardens High School (Spanish: Escuela Superior University Gardens, generally abbreviated as UGHS), formally University Gardens Community School Specialized in Science and Mathematics, is a secondary magnet school located in Hato Rey Sur, San Juan, Puerto Rico. University Gardens is run by the Puerto Rico Department of Education and is overseen by its Specialized Schools Unit (UnEE, for its initials in Spanish).

University Gardens is known for its high standards, its "hard work" culture coming into the national culture. Recognized for featuring some of the highest standardized test scores in Puerto Rico, it has been criticized for having 27.8% of its student population come from living below the poverty line.

== History ==
Since at least 1972 a high and middle school already existed in the gated eponymous community, located in the Río Piedras district. The University Gardens neighborhood is located right along PR-52, and close to the University of Puerto Rico, Río Piedras campus. It has historically been composed mostly of middle class and upper lower class families, and serves as "serves as a buffering zone between the rich and lower class areas of San Juan". Currently, there has been an influx of upper class individuals, who have transformed some residence into mansions. In 1976, it was converted into a magnet school.

Roxánna I. Duntley-Matos described the school's appearance as it was in 1981 as:

[having] a one level concrete building with modern aluminum-lined see-through glass doors. It gleamed of science—air conditioned science—surrounded by tropical concrete benches in the front patio, embraced by what seemed to be a square wired fence. Youth, dressed in yellow polos and dark blue pants, strolled around the yard discussing each other's romantic adventures, the latest movies, the upcoming parties or school special events, the homework they had failed to complete or tests they would soon have to face.

— Roxanna I. Duntley-Matos, Transformative Accomplices: Multicultural Community Organizing in a Transnational Educational Context,

It used to offer grades 10th–12th; however, this was changed by a Department of Education reorganization.

=== Earthquakes and COVID-19 ===
After the 2019–20 Puerto Rico earthquakes UGHS was evaluated and, while the field inspector declared the school "suitable for immediate operation and occupancy," they did note that there were fissures on the walls, as well as the façade of a wall that was close to breakings off.

During February 2021, it was one of 172 public schools identified as "suitable to open" that formed part of an initial phase proposed by the Department to resume in-person teaching starting in March. Nevertheless, this plan was abandoned, and in-person classes did not occur until 13 May.

On the first day of class seniors came in a caravan on the first day of school, as part of their traditional celebration for the beginning of their final school year. Due to the COVID-19 pandemic, from August 2021 onwards, classes will start at 8:00 a.m. and end at 1:00 p.m., after students receive their take-out only lunch.

== School community ==
=== Accreditation ===
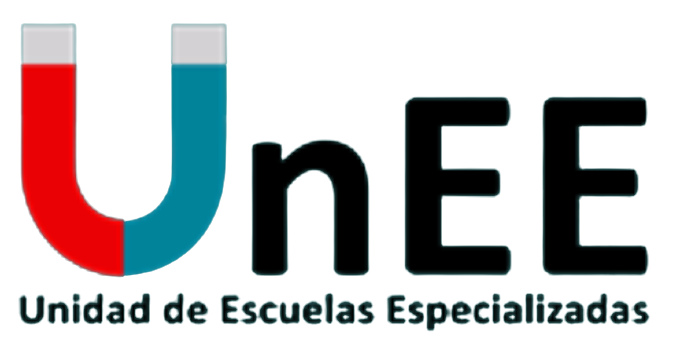
The Specialized Schools Unit's logo, the Department of Education's magnet school division

Accreditation is obtained from the Puerto Rico Education Council for six years. However, in 2014, it was approved, but not accredited, by the Council.

University Gardens is part of the Puerto Rico Department of Education's Specialized Schools Unit (UnEE, for its initials in Spanish), which at times has been under the Assistant Secretary for Academic Services, Educational Transformation Projects, Curriculum and Pedagogical Innovation Division, and the Undersecretariat for Academic and Program Affairs. In 1990, University Gardens was classified as an "Effective School", as instruction was based on Ronald Edmonds' model.

Being what is considered a five star school by the Department of Education, it receives less funds than those given to underperforming school, which receive more money for teachers' professional development. Recognized for featuring some of the highest standardized test scores in Puerto Rico, it has been criticized for having 27.8% of its student population come from living below the poverty line, as of 2018, down from 32.3% in the 1997-1998 school year, when it counted with a 758 total student population.

=== Superlatives ===
In 2018, six students from UGHS were selected to partake in the National Grid Engineering Pipeline Program in Syracuse, sponsored by National Grid, providing them with an all-expenses paid trip to visit the Fruit Belt Neighborhood Solar Partnership, the Niagara Power Project and Syracuse University.

=== School grounds ===
The Department of Education tends to use the school to interview applicants for posts at other schools. The school library was one of the first three public high school libraries to be chosen to participate in the Puerto Rico Librarian's Society's Puerto Rican Library Information and Documentation Network (PRILINET) in 1979.

=== School personnel ===
==== List of Principals ====
Principals	Denisse Valderrama Cintrón	August 2019	Incumbent
