= Mom Hid My Game! =

2016 video game

- Official artwork depicting two of the game's main characters, the playing character, a young boy, and his mother
- Developer: hap Inc.
- Publishers: Kemco hap Inc. (mobile)
- Programmer: Yuusaka Ishimoto
- Series: Mom Hid My Game
- Platforms: iOS; Android; Nintendo 3DS; Nintendo Switch; PlayStation 4
- Release: August 8, 2016: iOS/Android; WW: August 8, 2016 Nintendo 3DS; JP: July 12, 2017; WW: December 21, 2017 Nintendo Switch; WW: December 21, 2017 PlayStation 4; JP: August 12, 2020
- Genre: Puzzle
- Mode: Single-player

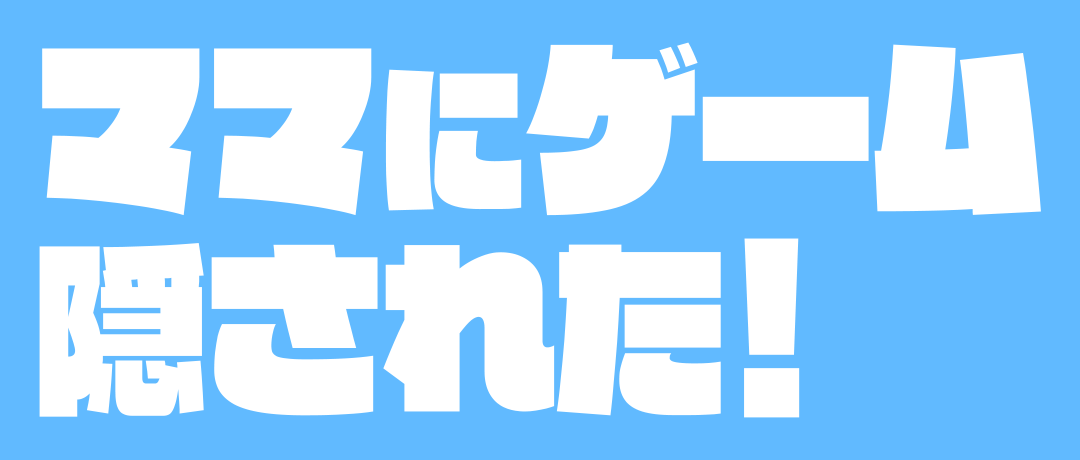
Japanese version logo

Mom Hid My Game! (Note: Japanese: ママにゲーム隠された, Hepburn: Mama ni Gēmu Kakusareta), originally released in English as Hidden my game by mom, is a 2016 puzzle video game developed and published by hap inc. for iOS and Android and later localized and published by Kemco for the Nintendo 3DS and Nintendo Switch in 2017. Later in 2020, the game was released on PlayStation 4.

== Gameplay ==
The game features the player as a young boy looking for his video game console (which heavily resembles a Nintendo DS), which was hidden by his mother. The game console is found by solving puzzles, such as moving items to certain spots to be able to reach the console.

In the Nintendo Switch release, a mode involving a man swinging around a pole was added. The minigame is presumably a reference to hap inc's older game Crazy Horizontal bar.

== Development ==
In an interview with The Verge in 2018, the game's developer, Yuusaku Ishimoto, stated that the game was inspired by manga, with each level being designed as if they were comic strips. In the same interview, Ishimoto stated that the game's characters were modeled after his childhood.

Initially, the game was released as Hidden My Game By Mom for iOS and Android. The game was developed by a one man team created by Yuusaku Ishimoto, with a grammatically incorrect title being taken with a help of Google Translate. The publisher for the console versions pointed out that the translation was off, prompting Ishimoto to correct the mistake.

The updated version was first showcased in a Nindies Showcase hosted by Nintendo on August 30, 2017. Later in early December 2017, the game was put on the Nintendo Switch eShop's "coming soon" list.

== Reception ==
Reception

Aggregate score
Aggregator	Score
Metacritic	73/100 (Switch) (Note: Based on 9 reviews.)

Review scores
Publication	Score
Destructoid	6.5/10 (Switch)
Nintendo Life	6/10 (Switch)
Nintendo World Report	9/10 (Switch)

Mom Hid My Game! received "mixed or average reviews" from critics, receiving a 73/100 on review aggregator Metacritic.

Polygon's Allegra Frank praised the game's premise of controlling a boy "who's obsessed with his Nintendo 3DS-style handheld." Frank also stated that the game's randomness made it "well-suited for [the] [Nintendo] Switch."

In July 2018, GameSpot's Chris Reed stated that Mom Hid My Game! was one of the best Nintendo Switch eShop games available in North America that were on sale.

In a review for Destructoid, Dan Roemer criticized the game's graphics and how the game feels "tame" compared to the mobile releases in the Hidden game by mom series but praised the game's sense of Japanese humor.

Nintendo Life's Jon Cousins stated that Mom Hid My Game! was "as easy to adore as it [was] to dismiss," and also said that the game's low production value gave it a unique charm.

In a review for Nintendo World Report, Neal Ronaghan praised the game's "amusing puzzle design," "clever and surprising gags and jokes," and "frantic pace," but criticized the game's short length, but also said that the short length was still "okay."

Vice Media's Janine Hawkins stated that Mom Hid My Game! has similarities to Nintendo's WarioWare series.
