= Clements Worldwide =

Insurance company

- Industry: International Insurance
- Founded: 1947
- Founder: Robert Clements; M. Juanita Guess-Clements
- Headquarters: Washington D.C., United States
- Area served: Worldwide
- Key people: Jon B. Clements (Chairman); Tarun Chopra (President & CEO); Smita Bhargava (Senior VP)
- Services: Insurance services: International Automobile; International Property & Liability Insurance; International Life & Health; K&R Insurance
- Website: clements.com

Clements Worldwide, originally Clements & Company and later Clements International, is a global insurance company founded in 1947 and headquartered in Washington, D.C., with offices in London and Dubai. Presently, the company provides international insurance for individuals and organizations with an emphasis on individual expatriates, international organizations, and global businesses. Clients include contractors serving in Iraq and Afghanistan.

== History ==
The company was originally founded as Clements & Company in 1947 in Washington, D.C., by husband and wife Robert S. Clements and M. Juanita Guess-Clements. The company’s headquarters are in Washington, D.C., with additional offices located in London, Dubai, Dublin, Gibraltar, and Brussels.

In 2007, at age 89, co-founder Robert Clements died. The company joined the Council of Insurance Agents and Brokers (CIAB) in 2008.

Clements provides Defense Base Act (DBA) insurance and other insurance products for contractors working for the U.S. government and others around the world.

Following the establishment of the company's first wholly owned international subsidiary in London in 2010, Clements International rebranded and became Clements Worldwide in 2011. On March 20, 2013, Clements Worldwide opened its third international office, in Dubai.

In 2010, Clements became licensed by the UK's Financial Services Authority (FSA) following its acquisition of the International Vehicle Risk Management (IVRM) business from Lockton Companies.

On February 20, 2013, Clements Worldwide announced its acquisition of UK-based expat insurance provider Italsure.

== Current Leadership ==
- Jon B. Clements – Chairman
- Tarun Chopra – President & CEO
- Smita Bhargava – Senior Vice President
