= Aptos Labs =

American technology company

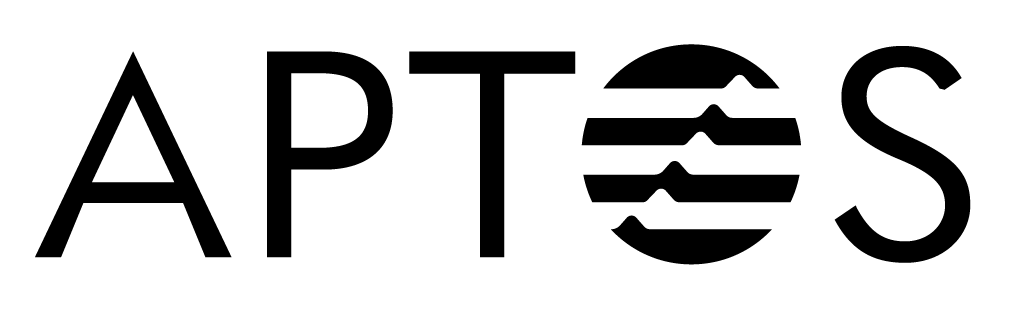
- Type: Private
- Industry: Blockchain, Cryptocurrency, Web3
- Founded: 2021; 5 years ago
- Founder: Avery Ching, Mo Shaikh
- Headquarters: Palo Alto, California, U.S.
- Website: Official website

Aptos Labs is a blockchain technology company headquartered in Palo Alto, California, known for developing the Aptos blockchain, a Layer-1 blockchain in the Web3 space. It was founded in 2021 by Avery Ching and Mo Shaikh, former employees of Facebook. Many other former Libra employees ended up joining Aptos Labs.

== History ==
Aptos Labs was founded in 2021 following the dissolution of Meta's Diem project, an attempt by the social media company to develop a stablecoin and blockchain ecosystem. Founded and led by Avery Ching and Mo Shaikh, who worked on Diem, leveraged their experience to create Aptos Labs. The Aptos blockchain, which uses the Move programming language, was designed to address limitations in scalability and efficiency that exist in other blockchain technologies.

Since its founding, Aptos Labs has secured funding from various investors. Avery and Mo raised $400 million ($200m series seed, $200m series A), with backing from notable venture capital firms such as Andreessen Horowitz, Apollo Global Management, and Franklin Templeton.

The company has partnered with Microsoft to explore the integration of blockchain technology with AI and data services. In addition, Google Cloud has collaborated with Aptos Labs to provide infrastructure support and run a validator on the Aptos network. The company has also worked with NBC Universal to create blockchain-based digital experiences.

In February 2023, Aptos Labs made an equity investment in the short-video social media app Chingari.

Aptos Labs is one of 11 firms selected to participate in the second phase of Hong Kong's e-HKD pilot program, an initiative led by the Hong Kong Monetary Authority (HKMA) to explore the feasibility of central bank digital currencies and tokenized deposits. Aptos Labs along with Boston Consulting Group and Hang Seng Bank, will test the commercial value of settling a tokenized fund using digital money on a public blockchain.

In October 2024, Aptos Labs has expanded into the Japanese blockchain market through the acquisition of HashPalette Inc., the developer of Palette Chain. In November, Aptos Labs led a $10 million funding round for the decentralized gaming network KGeN, bringing the network's valuation to $500 million.

On December 19, 2024, Mo Shaikh, stepped down from his position as CEO to “start a new chapter,” while remaining a strategic adviser. He was succeeded by Avery Ching, co‑founder and chief technology officer, who took over as CEO to lead the company into its next phase of technical innovation and ecosystem growth.
