= Colegio Rosa Bell =

School located in Guaynabo, Puerto Rico

Colegio Rosa-Bell

Location
- Calle Oviedo No. 42; Guaynabo, Puerto Rico 00968
- Coordinates: 18°23′20″N 66°07′06″W

Information
- School type: Independent Private School
- Established: 1968
- Founder: Rose P. Rodríguez and Rosa A. Laó
- CEEB code: 542111
- Director: Mr. Eduardo Rodríguez
- Faculty: 46
- Grades: Nursery-12
- Gender: Co-Ed
- Average class size: 20-25
- Language: Spanish/English
- Color: Green
- Slogan: La alternativa de excelencia
- Athletics: Puerto Rico High School Athletic Alliance
- Mascot: Cougars
- Website: www.rosabell.com

Colegio Rosa Bell is a private, co-educational school located in the Torrimar area in Guaynabo, Puerto Rico.

The school is accredited by the Puerto Rico Department of Education and the Middle States Association of Colleges and Schools and holds membership in the Asociación de Educación Privada de Puerto Rico, CITA and the College Board.

== History ==
In 1956, Sra. Poventud de Rodriguez established a small scholar building in her home to kids at her neighborhood, in Guaynabo. Instantly, more admissions for entry were received. After that, Rodriguez united forces with Sra. Acosta de Lao in 1968 and both rented a bigger building near the previous position, in Guaynabo. From there, it was established the year right before kindergarten (Pre-K) and Rosa-Bell with a start of about 230 students. Both directors decided to start a new adventure and, by kids parents' choice, begin elementary school. First grade started in 1970–1971. Because of great success, the directors decided to add a grade to the school every year, accredited by the Department of Public Instruction of Puerto Rico (DIPP). Finally, the school finished its high school in the academic year 1981–1982. The public registration increased, and they were forced to find new facilities. In 1974, they relocated to a new building, still closer to the previous spot, in the same city it is now. Since then, more facilities have been added, buildings have been remolded and improved, and better services with more classrooms have been presented.

== Curriculum ==
Rosa Bell has a set of varied elective classes (dance, photography, sketchbook, theater, French, German, Italian, engineering, marketing, home economics, physical education, art, chemistry, biology, environmental sciences, and many more). Students have been Presidential Scholars, National Hispanic Scholars, and National Merit Scholars.

== Extracurricular activities ==
Student groups and activities include Beta Club, Close-Up, National Honor Society, Presidential Classroom, and student council.

=== Athletics ===
Colegio Rosa Bell is also recognized for their excellent athletic programs, having a Varsity programs in 3 sports (volleyball, basketball, soccer, indoor soccer, tennis, track & field, golf, softball, cross country and swimming). They compete in the PRHSAA (Puerto Rico High School Athletic Alliance), where the most prestigious schools in Puerto Rico compete. They are known in sports as the Cougars since it is the school mascot. The athletic program is best known for their volleyball achievements. The current volleyball coach is Alejandro "Alejo" Román, former assistant coach of the Puerto Rico National Volleyball Team. The volleyball teams has had championships in the "El Nuevo Dia/ Burger King" Cup, "Primera Hora" Cup and in the PRHSAA.
