= Colegio Sagrados Corazones (Guaynabo, Puerto Rico) =

Catholic school, private school in Guaynabo, Puerto Rico

Sacred Hearts School, Guaynabo

Location
- 208 Ave Esmeralda; Urb. Ponce de León; Guaynabo, Puerto Rico 00969
- Coordinates: 18.371416°N 66.101472°W

Information
- Type: Catholic School, Private School
- Established: 1964
- CEEB code: 542112
- Grades: PK–12

Colegio Sagrados Corazones (Sacred Hearts School) was a Catholic day school in the municipality of Guaynabo in the metropolitan area of Puerto Rico. It offered PK-12 with a traditional educational approach and offered courses in the Spanish language. SSCC (as commonly abbreviated) was aimed at the Catholic denomination and offered a level of preschool and elementary in their academic program. The school was founded in 1964 and due to financial difficulties was permanently closed in 2019.
