= Diem (digital currency) =

Cryptocurrency project

- Diem's logo

Denominations
- Symbol: ≋

Development
- White paper: Diem whitepaper
- Initial release: Cancelled
- Code repository: github.com/diem/diem
- Development status: Announced
- Written in: Rust
- Developer: Diem Association
- Source model: Open source
- License: Apache License 2.0

Website
- Website: diem.com

Diem (formerly known as Libra) was a permissioned blockchain-based stablecoin payment system proposed by the American social media company Facebook. The plan also included a private currency implemented as a cryptocurrency. The launch was originally planned to be in 2020, but only rudimentary experimental code was released.

The project, currency, and transactions would have been managed and cryptographically entrusted to the Diem Association, a membership organization of companies from payment, technology, telecommunication, online marketplace and venture capital, and nonprofits. Before December 2020, the project was called "Libra", although this was changed to Diem following legal challenges regarding its name and logo.

The project generated backlash from government regulators in the European Union (EU), the United States, other countries, and among the general public over monetary sovereignty, financial stability, privacy, and antitrust concerns which ultimately helped kill the project. The Diem Association (originally the Libra Association) shut down in January 2022 and sold the project to Silvergate Bank. Silvergate wrote off their Diem investment in January 2023.

== History ==
Morgan Beller started working on cryptocurrency and blockchain at Facebook in 2017, and was initially the only person working on Facebook's blockchain initiative. Facebook vice president David A. Marcus moved from Facebook Messenger to a new blockchain division in May 2018. First reports of Facebook planning a cryptocurrency, with Marcus in charge, emerged a few days later. By February 2019, there were more than 50 engineers working on the project. Confirmation that Facebook intended a cryptocurrency first emerged in May 2019. At this time it was known as "GlobalCoin" or "Facebook Coin".

The project was formally announced on June 18, 2019, under the name Libra. The creators of the coin are listed as Morgan Beller, David Marcus and Kevin Weil (Novi's VP of Product). The first release was planned for 2020. On July 15, 2019, Facebook announced the currency would not launch until all regulatory concerns had been met and Libra had the "appropriate approvals". On September 18, 2019, during a meeting with top Senate Democratic leaders, Mark Zuckerberg said that Libra would not be launched anywhere in the world without first obtaining approval from United States regulators. In October 2019 multiple companies left Libra Association: PayPal left on October 4, eBay, Mastercard, Stripe, Visa and Mercado Pago followed on October 11, and Booking Holdings on October 14.

According to a November 2020 report in the Financial Times, Libra would be launching a slimmed down plan that included the cryptocurrency being a stablecoin backed by the US dollar rather than a multiple currency collection. The newspaper also reported that the cryptocurrency would now be called Diem, which is Latin for "day". In December 2020, Libra was rebranded as Diem, and the Libra Association renamed Diem Association. As of December 2020, Diem Association had 27 members. In January 2022, it was reported that the Diem Association was winding down, with Diem's assets being sold to the California-based Silvergate Capital for a reported $200 million. Facebook was also reported to have planned to launch the token in the US with it being issued by Silvergate, although the Federal Reserve and the United States Department of the Treasury were not supportive of the project. In January 2023, Silvergate announced in their earnings call for Q4 2022 that they were writing down their entire investment in Diem. Silvergate Bank was shut down in March 2023.

== Currency ==
The plan was for the Libra token to be backed by financial assets such as a basket of currencies, and US Treasury securities in an attempt to avoid volatility. Facebook announced that each of the partners would inject an initial US$10 million, so Libra had full asset backing on the day it opened. As of January 2020, Libra was said to have dropped the idea of a mixed currency basket in favor of individual stablecoins pegged to individual currencies.

Libra service partners, within the Libra Association, would create new Libra currency units based on demand. Libra currency units would be retired as they were redeemed for conventional currency. Initial reconciliation of transactions would be performed at each service partner, and the blockchain's distributed ledger would be used for reconciliation between service partners. The intent was to help prevent everyone but members of the Libra Association from trying to extract and analyze data from the distributed ledger. In contrast to cryptocurrencies such as bitcoin which use permissionless blockchains, Libra was not planned to be decentralized, relying on trust in the Libra Association as "a de facto central bank".

In September 2019, Facebook announced that the reserve basket would be made up of: 50% United States dollar, 18% euro, 14% Japanese yen, 11% pound sterling, and 7% Singapore dollar. Libra considered using coins based on individual national currencies on the network, alongside the basket-based Libra token. This was first mooted publicly by David Marcus in October 2019, and by Mark Zuckerberg in his October 2019 Senate testimony. The idea was promoted again in March 2020.

On April 16, 2020, Libra announced plans to create an infrastructure for multiple cryptocurrencies, the preponderance of which would be backed by individual fiat currencies, and said the association was in talks with regulators from Switzerland for a payments license. In May 2021, Diem announced that it had withdrawn its application to the Swiss Financial Market Supervisory Authority and said that it would instead seek approval with the US treasury to register as a money services business.

== Diem Association ==
Facebook established the Libra Association (later renamed to Diem Association) to oversee the currency, founded in Geneva, Switzerland. As of December 2020, Diem Association included:

- Payments: PayU Checkout.com
- Technology and marketplaces: Facebook's subsidiary Novi Financial, Farfetch, Spotify, Shopify
- Taxis: Lyft, Uber
- Telecommunications: Iliad SA
- Blockchain: Anchorage, Bison Trails, Coinbase, Xapo
- Venture capital: Andreessen Horowitz, Breakthrough Initiatives, Ribbit Capital, Thrive Capital, Union Square Ventures, Slow Ventures, Temasek Holdings
- Nonprofit and multilateral organizations, and academic institutions: Creative Destruction Lab, Kiva, Mercy Corps, Women's World Banking, Heifer International

Seven other companies had been named as Libra Association members in the initial June 2019 announcement, but left before the first Libra meeting on October 14, 2019: Booking Holdings, eBay, Mastercard, Mercado Pago, PayPal, Stripe and Visa Inc. Visa chairman and CEO Alfred F. Kelly clarified in July that Visa had not joined, but had signed a nonbinding letter of intent; and that "no one has yet officially joined." He said that factors determining whether Visa would, in fact, join included "the ability of the association to satisfy all the requisite regulatory requirements." Vodafone joined the association in October 2019 but left in January 2020, saying they preferred to work on their mobile banking subsidiary M-Pesa.

Press coverage around the initial Libra announcement noted the absence of Apple Pay, Google Pay, Amazon and of any banks. Banking executives had been reluctant to join due to uncertainties surrounding regulation and feasibility of the scheme. In late February 2020, e-commerce site Shopify and cryptocurrency brokerage Tagomi joined. The association hoped to grow to 100 members with an equal vote. In late April 2020, the payment processing company, Checkout.com, announced they would be joining the association. In May 2020, Singapore state investor Temasek Holdings, cryptocurrency investor Paradigm Operations and private equity firm Slow Ventures announced they would join the association. Libra Association was renamed to Diem Association on December 1, 2020, as part of the rebranding from Libra to Diem.

== Reception ==
The project faced criticism, as well as opposition from central banks. The use of a cryptocurrency and blockchain for the implementation was questioned.

=== European Union regulatory response ===
The first regulator response to Libra came within minutes of the launch announcement, from French Finance Minister, Bruno Le Maire, who was being interviewed on French radio station Europe 1. He said that Libra could not be allowed to become a sovereign currency, and would require strong consumer protections. Le Maire then warned the French Parliament of his concerns about Libra and privacy, money laundering and terrorism finance. He called on the central bank governors of the Group of Seven to prepare a report on Facebook's plans. Bank of England governor Mark Carney said there was a need to keep an "open mind" about new technology for money transfers, but "anything that works in this world will become instantly systemic and will have to be subject to the highest standards of regulation."

German MEP Markus Ferber warned that Facebook could become a shadow bank. His colleague Stefan Berger sees Libra's power potential as a threat to the economic stability of the euro zone and its democracies: Libra could make Facebook its central bank. Berger argues in favor of the development of a European stablecoin in order to be able to offer a secure alternative to the Facebook currency. Berger will be in charge of the European report of Markets in Crypto-Assets (MiCA) which will serve as base for a regulatory framework for crypto-assets. On September 13, 2019, Le Maire stated that France would not allow development of Libra in the European Union, as it would have been a threat to the monetary sovereignty of states. He also spoke about the potential for abuse of marketing dominance and systemic financial risks as reasons for not allowing stablecoins to operate yet within the EU.

According to a Reuters report, German Finance Minister Olaf Scholz said following a video conference of G7 finance ministers that Germany and Europe cannot accept Diem currency entry into the market while the regulatory risks are not adequately addressed. Scholz stated that he does not support private-sector digital currencies, and his remarks could be detrimental to Diem and JPMorgan Coin. Valdis Dombrovskis, Executive Vice-President of the European Commission for An Economy that Works for People, stated at the Digital Finance Outreach 2020 Closing Conference that the European Union was preparing a new cryptocurrency regime that may include stricter requirements for "global stablecoin" projects like Libra. In addition, Dombrovskis stated in his address that stablecoins that function on a global scale can "present new concerns" as they can disturb financial and monetary stability.

=== United States regulatory response ===
US regulators and politicians expressed concerns within hours of the mid-2019 announcement. Maxine Waters, Chairperson of the United States House Committee on Financial Services Committee asked Facebook to halt the development and launch of Libra, citing a list of recent scandals and that "the cryptocurrency market currently lacks a clear regulatory framework". The US House Committee on Financial Services Democrats sent a letter to Facebook asking the company to stop development of Libra, citing concerns of privacy, national security, trading, and monetary policy. Jerome Powell, chairman of the Federal Reserve, testified before Congress on July 10, 2019, that the Fed had "serious concerns" as to how Libra would deal with "money laundering, consumer protection and financial stability." President Donald Trump tweeted on July 12, 2019, that "If Facebook and other companies want to become a bank, they must seek a new Banking Charter and become subject to all Banking Regulations."

US regulators contacted Visa, PayPal, Mastercard and Stripe, asking for a complete overview of how Libra would fit into their anti-money-laundering compliance programs. Since several participants left the project in late 2019, the Libra Association worked to address concerns from United States regulators with the development of a "Libra 2.0" blueprint. According to CNBC, Diem reportedly withdrawn its application for a Swiss payment license in 2021, intending to instead move its activities to the United States. Diem announced that it would relocate its operating headquarters from Geneva to Washington with an intend to establish its payment system in the United States.

=== Other countries ===
David Marcus told the US Senate that the Swiss Federal Data Protection and Information Commissioner would oversee privacy for Libra, but the commissioner said that it had not heard from Facebook at all. The government of Japan began the process of investigating Libra and doing an analysis on the effect on Japan's monetary policy and financial regulation. In July 2019, Japanese officials formed a working committee, consisting of the Bank of Japan, the Ministry of Finance and the Financial Services Agency, to coordinate policies to address Libra's impact on regulation, monetary policy, tax, and payments settlement. The working group would coordinate measures to handle Libra's influence on regulation, monetary policy, tax, and payments settlement. This would be done before the Group of Seven meeting in France between August 24 and 26, 2019.

Data protection regulators internationally issued a statement, asking Facebook to protect personal data of users, and to detail Libra's planned practices for handling personal data, in the light of "previous episodes where Facebook's handling of people's information has not met the expectations of regulators, or their own users." Finance Watch described Libra as a "huge risk to public monetary sovereignty", and concluded that "Libra is a bad idea – for its users, for the stability of our financial system, and last but not least for our democracy." On September 16, 2019, officials from the Libra consortium, including J.P. Morgan and Facebook, met with officials from 26 central banks, including the Federal Reserve and Bank of England, in Basel, Switzerland and the meeting was chaired by European Central Bank board member Benoît Cœuré, a vocal Libra critic.

=== Privacy concerns ===
Industry observers have speculated whether Libra would provide meaningful privacy to its users. Facebook's plan was to let its subsidiary Novi Financial manage Libra for Facebook users, and Facebook executives had stated that Novi would not share account holder's purchase information with Facebook without authorization; however, the system was also planned to include a friend-finder search function, and the use of this function would constitute permission for Novi to combine the account holder's transaction history with their Facebook account.

According to an August 2018 report by CNBC, top data protection officials including Democratic FTC commissioner Rohit Chopra, UK Information Commissioner Elizabeth Denham, EU Data Protection Supervisor Giovanni Buttarelli, and other top regulators from Australia, Canada, Albania, and Burkina Faso in a joint statement expressed doubts over Facebook's proposed digital currency project Libra (Diem). According to CNBC, Facebook confirmed that governments and regulators throughout the world were scrutinizing Libra. In general, consumer advocates and public interest groups have opposed Diem on privacy grounds and rejected the tethering of financial services to mass surveillance.

=== Antitrust concerns ===
Scholars highlighted several antitrust risks associated with Diem, namely, a risk of collusion between association members, a risk of tying between Diem and Novi, and a risk of exclusivity agreements if Novi is required to use Diem within Facebook environment.

=== Fake Libra websites ===
Facebook tried to police inaccurate information and fake Libra websites on its platform. According to The Washington Post, nearly a dozen fake accounts, pages, and groups on Facebook and Instagram advertised themselves as legitimate centres for the Libra digital currency, in some cases trying to sell discounted Libra which was not yet accessible. Numerous of these counterfeit pages used the Facebook logo, images of Facebook CEO Mark Zuckerberg, and Libra's official marketing material. The growth of fake pages and groups devoted to Libra added to Facebook's difficulties with global authorities.

== Legal issues ==
Diem Association (formerly Libra Association) faced legal challenges as both the name and the logo of the digital currency were already in use within different territories. Finco Services Inc filed a lawsuit with New York Southern District Court against Facebook, Inc., Novi Financial, Inc., Jlv, LLC and Character SF, LLC for an alleged trademark infringement, arising out of the use by the latter of a logo similar to the start-up bank operated by Finco Services, Inc. The plaintiff requested a preliminary and permanent injunctive relief as well as monetary relief from the defendants. A settlement conference in this matter was scheduled for March 26, 2020, in the United States Courthouse, while the parties did not consent to conducting the proceedings before a magistrate judge and requested to be tried to a jury.

In Europe, Libra Association filed an application with the European Union Intellectual Property Office for the registration of the word "LIBRA" as a verbal trademark. The proceeding already received five oppositions to registration from four European companies based mainly on the alleged likelihood of confusion with their prior trademarks. The opposing companies are Lyra Network, Libra Internet Bank, Libri GmbH and Advanced New Technologies Co., Ltd. In April 2020, the parties would have reached the adversarial part of the opposition proceedings, unless a settlement was reached during the cooling-off period.

== Implementation ==
=== Blockchain consensus ===
Diem stated it would not rely on cryptocurrency mining. Only members of Diem Association would have been able to process transactions via the permissioned blockchain. Diem hoped to begin transitioning to a permissionless proof-of-stake system within five years, although their own materials admitted that no solution existed "that can deliver the scale, stability, and security needed to support billions of people and transactions across the globe through a permissionless network."

=== Software ===
Diem source code was written in Rust and published as open source under the Apache License on GitHub. In June 2019, Elaine Ou, an opinion writer at Bloomberg News, tried compiling and running the publicly released code for Libra. At the time, the software did little more than allow fake coins to be put in a wallet; almost none of the functionality outlined in the white paper was implemented, including "major architectural features that have yet to be invented." Ou was surprised that Facebook "would release software in such a state".

=== Digital wallet ===
In June 2019, Facebook announced plans to release a digital wallet called Calibra in 2020, as a standalone app and also to integrate it within Messenger and WhatsApp. In May 2020, Calibra was renamed Novi.

=== Move ===
Move is a statically typed programming language originally developed for the Diem blockchain's smart contract and custom transactions system. It is compiled to bytecode and features resource-oriented programming with strong safety guarantees. The Move language was initially introduced in the Move white paper and has since been fully documented and implemented across multiple blockchain platforms. An example of Move syntax from the original white paper shows its resource-handling capabilities:

public main(payee: address, amount: u64) {
    let coin: 0x0.Currency.Coin = 0x0.Currency.withdraw_from_sender(copy(amount));
    0x0.Currency.deposit(copy(payee), move(coin));
}

The language's key feature is the ability to define custom resource types with semantics inspired by linear logic: a resource can never be copied or implicitly discarded, only moved between program storage locations. These safety guarantees are enforced statically by Move's type system. Following Diem's discontinuation, Move development has continued and evolved through implementations in other blockchain ecosystems including Aptos and Sui.

== See also ==
- Beenz – an earlier attempt at an Internet-wide digital currency
- Facebook Credits
- Flooz – an earlier attempt at an Internet-wide digital currency
- List of online payment service providers
