= Commonwealth-Parkville School =

College prep school in Puerto Rico

Commonwealth High School
- Commonwealth-Parkville School (CPS)

Location
- Urb. Roosevelt; 100 Cesar Castillo; San Juan 00918; Puerto Rico
- 18°25′03″N 66°03′51″W

Information
- Established: 1952
- Status: Open
- Director: Dr. Vanessa M. Fernández
- Head of school: Brian Dolinger, Ed.D.
- Faculty: 32
- Grades: 7–12
- Age range: 12–18
- Hours in school day: 7:45 a.m – 2:45 p.m.
- Colors: Red, Grey, Black and White
- Website: www.cpspr.org

Parkville Campus
- Commonwealth-Parkville School (CPS)

Location
- Guaynabo, Puerto Rico; Puerto Rico
- 18°22′17″N 66°05′34″W

Information
- Established: 1964
- Status: Open
- Director: Aida Portela
- Head of school: Brian Dolinger, Ed.D.
- Faculty: 100
- Grades: PPK–6
- Age range: 3–11
- Average class size: 18 students
- Hours in school day: 7:45 a.m – 2:45 p.m. Afterschool Program: 3:00 p.m. – 5:30 p.m.

Commonwealth–Parkville School (CPS), founded in 1952, and incorporated in Puerto Rico, is a private, college preparatory day school. It is a non-sectarian, not-for-profit, co-educational institution governed by a board of trustees. CPS provides an integrated PPK–12 curriculum in English with a strong program in Spanish. It is located on two campuses: Parkville Campus in Guaynabo, PR (grades PPK-6), and Commonwealth Campus in Hato Rey, San Juan, PR (grades 7–12).

== History ==
Commonwealth-Parkville School (formerly known as Caribbean Preparatory School) is a private, college preparatory day school founded in 1952 and incorporated in Puerto Rico. It is a non-sectarian, not-for-profit, co-educational institution governed by a board of directors. CPS provides an integrated PPK-12 curriculum in English with a program in Spanish. CPS’ history dates back to 1951 when several families relocated to Puerto Rico to work with the Economic Development Administration (Fomento). The main obstacle these parents faced was the lack of English language schools for their children. They began looking for physical facilities and studying the requirements to create an English school that would fulfill their need for education.

They rented a community center located in the Roosevelt neighborhood in Hato Rey, where Commonwealth Middle and High School are located today. The school began with 92 students, eight teachers, and eight classrooms. Every year a new grade was added until 1961, when Commonwealth School graduated its first twelfth grade class of 10 students. Parallel to Commonwealth High School's founding is the history of the San Juan School by the Sea. These two schools instituted a new educational system in the history of education in Puerto Rico. Seven parents started the San Juan by the Sea Elementary School. It consisted of a kindergarten through sixth grade and was located in a rented apartment in Condado. Later, the school moved to a property in Punta Las Marías.

In 1964, Commonwealth Middle and High School was at capacity and grades kindergarten through twelfth needed more classrooms to accommodate all students. Parkville School in Guaynabo was then built to serve as the elementary campus. The three schools: Commonwealth, San Juan by the Sea, and Parkville, constituted the Caribbean Consolidated Schools system, which was incorporated in 1964. In 1979, the board of directors voted to sell San Juan by the Sea and improve facilities at Parkville and Commonwealth Campuses.

In 2014, a teacher from Commonwealth-Parkville won "most influential teacher" and was honored by the US Department of Education.

== Academics ==
CPS offers a variety of AP courses and is fully accredited by the MSA. CPS is a member of the Network of Complementary Schools. Graduates matriculate into the top colleges and universities in the United States, Puerto Rico and around the world.

In 2019, students from CPS were among others participating in a forum on whether there is participatory democracy in Puerto Rico.

== Athletics ==
As member of the Puerto Rico High School Athletic Alliance (PRHSAA) and Liga Atlética Mini Escuelas Privadas, Inc. (LAMEPI), CPS has volleyball, soccer, swimming, basketball, indoor soccer, softball, bowling, cross country, table tennis, track and field, tennis, and golf varsity and junior varsity teams.

== Notable alumni ==
- Olga Merediz
