= Virtual currency =

Unregulated means of exchange within a user group

Virtual currency, or virtual money, is a digital currency that is typically unregulated, issued and usually controlled by its developers, and used and accepted electronically among the members of a specific virtual community as part of a virtual economy. In 2014, the European Banking Authority defined virtual currency as "a digital representation of value that is neither issued by a central bank or a public authority, nor necessarily attached to a fiat currency but is accepted by natural or legal persons as a means of payment and can be transferred, stored or traded electronically." A digital currency issued by a central bank is referred to as a central bank digital currency.

== Definitions ==
In 2012, the European Central Bank (ECB) defined virtual currency as "a type of unregulated, digital money, which is issued and usually controlled by its developers, and used and accepted among the members of a specific virtual community".

In 2013, the Financial Crimes Enforcement Network (FinCEN), a bureau of the US Treasury, in contrast to its regulations defining currency as "the coin and paper money of the United States or of any other country that [i] is designated as legal tender and that [ii] circulates and [iii] is customarily used and accepted as a medium of exchange in the country of issuance", also called "real currency" by FinCEN, defined virtual currency as "a medium of exchange that operates like a currency in some environments, but does not have all the attributes of real currency". In particular, virtual currency does not have legal tender status in any jurisdiction.

In 2014, the European Banking Authority defined virtual currency as "a digital representation of value that is neither issued by a central bank or a public authority, nor necessarily attached to a fiat currency, but is accepted by natural or legal persons as a means of payment and can be transferred, stored or traded electronically."-

In 2018, Directive (EU) 2018/843 of the European Parliament and of the Council entered into force. The Directive defines the term "virtual currencies" to mean "a digital representation of value that is not issued or guaranteed by a central bank or a public authority, is not necessarily attached to a legally established currency and does not possess a legal status of currency or money, but is accepted by natural or legal persons as a means of exchange and which can be transferred, stored and traded electronically."

== History of the term ==
In a 2013 congressional hearing on virtual currencies, Ben Bernanke said they "have been viewed as a form of 'electronic money' or area of payment system technology that has been evolving over the past 20 years," referencing a 1995 congressional hearing on the Future of Money before the Committee on Banking and Financial Services. The Internet currency Flooz was created in 1999. The term "virtual currency" appears to have been coined around 2009, paralleling the development of digital currencies and social gaming.

Although the correct classification is "digital currency", the US government prefers and has uniformly adopted the term "virtual currency". The FinCEN was first, followed by the FBI in 2012, the General Accounting Office in 2013, as well as the government agencies testifying at the November 2013 US Senate hearing on bitcoin, including the Department of Homeland Security, the US Securities and Exchange Commission, and the Office of the Attorney General.

== Limits on being currency ==
Attributes of a real currency, as defined in 2011 in the Code of Federal Regulations, such as real paper money and real coins are simply that they act as legal tender and circulate "customarily".

In March 2014, the IRS decided to treat bitcoin and other virtual currencies as property for tax purposes, not as currency. Adam Levitin, a law professor at Georgetown University, suggested that this made bitcoins not fungible, that is one bitcoin is not identical to another bitcoin, unlike one gallon of crude oil being identical to another gallon of crude oil and making bitcoin unworkable as a currency. Others have stated that a measure like accounting on average cost basis would restore fungibility to the currency.

== Categorization by currency flow ==
=== Closed virtual currencies ===
Virtual currencies have been called "closed" or "fictional currency" when they have no official connection to the real economy, for example, currencies in massively multiplayer online role-playing games such as World of Warcraft. While there may be a grey market for exchanging such currencies or other virtual assets for real-world assets, this is usually forbidden by the games' terms of service.

=== Virtual currencies with currency flow into one direction ===
This type of currency, units of which may also be circulated as (printed) coupons, stamps or reward points, has been known for a long time in the form of customer incentive programs or loyalty programs. A coupon loses its face value when redeemed for an eligible asset or service (hence: flow in one direction), may be valid for only a limited time and subject to other restrictions set by the issuer. The business issuing the coupon functions as a central authority. Coupons remained unchanged for 100 years until new technology enabling credit cards became more common in the 1980s, and credit card rewards were invented. The latest incarnation drives the increase of internet commerce, online services, development of online communities and games. Here virtual or game currency can be bought, but not exchanged back into real money. The virtual currency is akin to a coupon. Examples are frequent flyer programs by various airlines, Microsoft Points, Nintendo Points, Facebook Credits and Amazon Coin.

=== Convertible virtual currencies ===
A virtual currency that can be bought with and sold back is called a convertible currency. A virtual currency can be decentralized, for example bitcoin, a cryptocurrency. Transacting or even holding convertible virtual currency may be illegal in particular jurisdictions and to particular national citizens at particular times and the transactor/recipient/facilitator liable for prosecution by the State.

== Centralized versus decentralized ==
FinCEN defined centralized virtual currencies in 2013 as virtual currencies that have a "centralized repository", similar to a central bank, and a "central administrator".

A decentralized currency was defined by the US Department of Treasury as a "currency (1) that has no central repository and no single administrator, and (2) that persons may obtain by their own computing or manufacturing effort". Rather than relying on confidence in a central authority, it depends instead on a distributed system of trust.

== Money matrix ==
Digital currency is a particular form of currency which is electronically transferred and stored, i.e., distinct from physical currency, such as coins or banknotes. According to the European Central Bank, virtual currencies are "generally digital", although their enduring precursor, the coupon, for example, is physical.

A cryptocurrency is a digital currency using cryptography to secure transactions and to control the creation of new currency units. Since not all virtual currencies use cryptography, not all virtual currencies are cryptocurrencies.

Cryptocurrencies are not always legal tender, but some countries have moved to regulate cryptocurrency-related services as they would financial institutions. Ecuador is the first country attempting a government run a cryptography-free digital currency; during the introductory phase from Christmas Eve 2014 until mid February 2015 people can open accounts and change passwords. At the end of February 2015 transactions of electronic money will be possible.

Estonia has been exploring various possibilities for blockchain technology, such as Estcoin and the use of crypto tokens within its e-residency program, which gives both Estonians and foreigners a digital form of identification.

The money matrix adapted from an ECB work, Virtual Currency Schemes			Money format		
The money matrix adapted from an ECB work, Virtual Currency Schemes			Physical	Digital	
The money matrix adapted from an ECB work, Virtual Currency Schemes			Physical	Cryptography-free	Cryptography-based or cryptocurrency
Legal status	Unregulated	Centralized	Coupon	Internet coupon (Note: The cells with the blue background denote a virtual currency.)	
Legal status	Unregulated	Centralized	Coupon	Mobile coupon	
Legal status	Unregulated	Centralized	Local currencies	Centralized virtual currencies	
Legal status	Unregulated	Decentralized	Physical commodity money	Digital currency, Ripple, Stellar	Decentralized cryptocurrencies
Legal status	Regulated		Banknotes, coins, and cash	E-money	
Legal status	Regulated		Banknotes, coins, and cash	Commercial bank money (deposits)	

== Regulation ==
Virtual currencies pose challenges for central banks, financial regulators, departments or ministries of finance, as well as fiscal authorities and statistical authorities. Gareth Murphy, Central Bank of Ireland, described the regulatory challenges posed by virtual currencies as relating to:

- Economic statistics
- Monetary and exchange rate policy
- Tax leakage
- Payment systems and settlement infrastructure
- Consumer protection
- Anti–money laundering
- Impact of financial regulation on financial service providers

=== United States ===
==== Commodity Futures Trading Commission guidance ====
The US Commodity Futures Trading Commission (CFTC) has determined virtual currencies are properly defined as commodities in 2015. The CFTC warned investors against pump and dump schemes that use virtual currencies.

==== Internal Revenue Service guidance ====
The US Internal Revenue Service (IRS) ruling Notice 2014-21 defines any virtual currency, cryptocurrency and digital currency as property; gains and losses are taxable within standard property policies.

==== Treasury guidance ====
On 20 March 2013, the Financial Crimes Enforcement Network issued a guidance to clarify how the US Bank Secrecy Act applied to persons creating, exchanging and transmitting virtual currencies.

==== Securities and Exchange Commission guidance ====
In May 2014 the US Securities and Exchange Commission (SEC) "warned about the hazards of bitcoin and other virtual currencies".

==== State regulations ====
===== New York state regulation =====
In July 2014, the New York State Department of Financial Services proposed the most comprehensive regulation of virtual currencies to date commonly referred to as a BitLicense. Unlike the US federal regulators it has gathered input from bitcoin supporters and the financial industry through public hearings and a comment period until October 21, 2014, to customize the rules. The proposal, per NY DFS press release "sought to strike an appropriate balance that helps protect consumers and root out illegal activity". It has been criticized by smaller companies to favor established institutions, and Chinese bitcoin exchanges have complained that the rules are "overly broad in its application outside the United States".

=== European Union ===
==== European Central Bank guidance ====
In February 2015 the ECB concluded "Virtual currency schemes, such as Bitcoin, are not full forms of money as usually defined in economic literature, nor are virtual currencies money or currency from a legal perspective. Nevertheless, Virtual currency may substitute [for] banknotes and coins, scriptural money and e-money in certain payment situations". In a May 2019 report ECB expressed concerns that "crypto assets provide opportunity for anonymous participation in illegal activities of all sorts".

==== Legal classification ====
In the European Union, a legal definition of cryptocurrency was introduced to be broadly be regarded as "a digital representation of value that can be digitally transferred, stored or traded and is accepted… as a medium of exchange" in the 5th Anti Money Laundering Directive. This also means that within the European Union cryptocurrencies and cryptocurrency exchanges are considered "obliged entities" subject to the European Union's Anti-Money Laundering Directives, and face the same CFT/AML regulations. As of July 20, 2021, the European Commission has proposed replacing the previous Directive 2015/849/EU with provisions from the 6th Anti-Money Laundering Directive.

Virtual currencies are defined as "a digital representation of value that is not issued or guaranteed by a central bank or a public authority, is not necessarily attached to a legally established currency and does not possess a legal status of currency or money, but is accepted by natural or legal persons as a means of exchange and which can be transferred, stored and traded electronically".

The fact that European Union lawmakers regard Bitcoin as the archetypal example of virtual currencies and that Bitcoin therefore fulfills all elements of the legal definition can serve as an anchor point for interpretation. Basically, the definition consists of six elements:

1. Virtual currencies are digital representations of value. Thus, digital assets must have a certain value in business transactions in order to be considered virtual currencies under EU law.
2. Virtual currencies are not issued or guaranteed by a central bank or public authority. Issuing is the first placement of a digital asset in the market. Guaranteeing is the assumption of third-party or own liabilities. If digital assets are issued or guaranteed by a central bank or public body, they are not virtual currencies.
3. Virtual currencies can be attached to a legal currency. Attachment is a legal or economic mechanism that links the value of the digital asset to a legal currency.
4. Virtual currencies do not have the legal status of a currency or money. This depends on the status of a digital asset in the EU or a Member State.
5. Virtual currencies are accepted by natural or legal persons as a means of exchange. This is the core element of the legal definition: The term "medium of exchange" is best understood in negative terms and requires that a digital asset is neither e-money as defined by the EU E-Money Directive, nor a payment service or payment instrument as defined by the EU Payment Services Directive II, nor any other means of payment as defined by the EU Capital Requirements Directive IV. The concept of acceptance requires a certain minimum of actual demand for the digital asset on the market to be considered a virtual currency.
6. Virtual currencies can be transferred, stored and traded electronically. Only digital assets that can be transferred electronically to a person (transfer), whereby the owner also has the option of preventing transfers without his intervention (storage), fulfill this concept.

The authors of the legal definition under EU law primarily had blockchain technology in mind – and Bitcoin as an archetypal form. Against this background, it is remarkable that the definition does not contain any elements tailored to the use of a particular technology. On the contrary, the legal definition is strikingly technology neutral.

== See also ==
- Complementary currency
- List of digital currencies
- Token money
- Virtual goods
