= Roberto Cofresí in popular culture =

Depictions of the Puerto Rican pirate

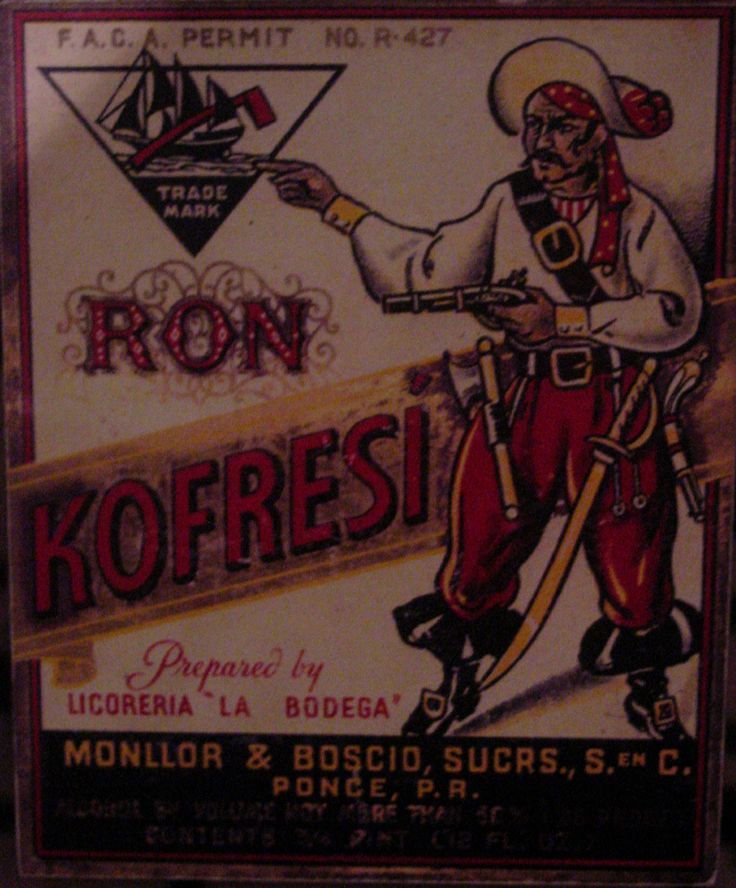
A label of Ron Kofresí depicts Cofresí wearing some of the cliché elements attributed to pirates in popular culture and others that are distinctive of his representation in Puerto Rican culture, such as the Ax of Cabo Rojo.

Regarded as the last successful pirate of the Caribbean during the 19th century's suppression era, the life of Roberto Cofresí has been romanticized in his native Puerto Rico and neighboring nations. Already possessing a reputation as hard to capture in life, the freebooter became a symbol for an archipelago immersed in the political unrest caused by its status as a colony within the struggling Spanish Empire. Under these circumstances, Cofresí was soon characterized as a benign and generous thief. In a similar trend, he was also associated with the Puerto Rican independence movement of the era. During the late 19th and early 20th century, the abundant oral tradition led to a subgenre of folk hero literature which depicted Cofresí as a benevolent force and contradicted the other pirate-related works of the time, including the well known Treasure Island and Peter Pan. A century later, this contrast became the subject of sociological study. Research to uncover the historical figure behind these myths has also been published by authors linked to the Puerto Rican Genealogical Society, which creates a parallel to this narrative.

While in prison, Cofresí claimed to possess at least 4,000 pieces of eight still accessible after the authorities confiscated his ship, mentioning them in an unsuccessful attempt to bribe an officer in exchange for his freedom. (Note: This quantity is equivalent to 31.25 pounds of silver.) This made him one of the few pirates that are implied to have kept a hidden cache, a rare occurrence despite its prominence in popular culture due to their tendency to divide and misspend the earnings, and fueled legends of buried treasures waiting to be found. All sort of objects serve as the subjects of these tales, from magic guitars made of solid gold to chests that are bound to chains that emerge from the sea. This tendency had extended to Hispaniola by the end of the 19th century, with a novel claiming that the island served as the locale of such treasures. During the 20th century, the destination marketing organizations in the region took notice of them and began exploiting the association of certain places and the pirate to attract tourism. Raising his profile during this time period also led to several non-profit homages. Cofresí has since served as the namesake of several sport teams and events, vehicles, companies, alcoholic brands and hotels. Figures such as Alejandro Tapia y Rivera, Luis Lloréns Torres, Rafael Hernández Marín and Juan Emilio Viguié worked to adapt the legends to other mediums, including plays, popular music and films. Cofresí is also the only pirate of the pre-flight era to have a copycat crime in his stead recorded during the 20th century. This happened when his name was employed as an alias during the first act of sky piracy involving an American airline.

An entirely different class of myths was created by those that were directly affected by his actions, be it politically or economically. The first to vilify the pirate and his deeds were the merchants that suffered severe losses during the peak of his career, who described him as nothing more than a tyrant. A mistranslated letter that actually reports the death of a crewmember, but misidentifies it as "Cofresin", may have been the catalyst behind several legends that grant Cofresí a connection to the supernatural. These come in two classes, those that portray him as being nearly impossible to eliminate, employing magic to survive lethal wounds such as being stabbed in the heart or even reincarnating if successfully killed, and those that grant extraordinary powers to his ghost. A variety of reasons are given for these abilities, from a pact with the Devil to the practice of witchcraft or mysticism. Some curses are also associated to his figure, of which at least one is purported to have been fulfilled with the shipwreck of the U.S.S. Grampus. Of these, most concern those that loot the treasures that he left behind and usually conclude with the victim dead or dragged to Davy Jones's locker.

== Traits and popular perception ==
As is the case with other pirates, the actual traits of Cofresí became romanticized and entangled in the mythic aura that surrounds his person long ago. Cofresí was known to be bold and risky, to the point that Salvador Brau argues in Historia de Puerto Rico that had he lived during the 18th century, he would have even eclipsed the accomplishments of Miguel Enríquez. Historian Walter Cardona Bonet also supports this notion, noting that he acted with "a lot of courage and bravery", with his leadership being further established by his "charisma [and] intelligence". This particular aspect, has been heavily mystified, with most legends emphasizing his bravery. The Spanish authorities actually recognized this trait, which Pedro Tomas de Córdova notes in his compilation, Memorias, and may have unwittingly help develop a cult of personality around his figure. During his lifetime, the colonial government of Puerto Rico made efforts to portray him as a fierce and violent criminal. His epithet, "The Terror of the Seas", reflects his position as the unopposed "Pirate Lord" of the region during the early 19th century. In the United States, the media did its part by sensationalizing Cofresí's death row confession of having murdered around 400 victims. This had the effect of portraying him as an antithesis to authority in a troubled society. Author Robert Fernández Valledor notes that the legends that follow his life basically emerge from this status as "Puerto Rico's first rebel". As a consequence of the power void following his death, there was a sharp decline in piracy as no other figure could gather the support of the local population in this fashion. This tendency was reflected throughout the Caribbean, where no pirate would be involved in instigating a similar number of homicides until "The Rajah" John Boysie Singh in the 20th century.

Cofresí is said to have possessed a rebellious personality and to have been rather independent, taking decisions under his own criteria. He also appeared to be very keen, to the point of being capable of causing the ridicule of the authorities that pursued him. His nautical savvy and familiarity with naval strategy have been attributed to a privileged education and growing in a harbor town. According to historian Enriquez Ramírez Brau's Cofresí: historia y genealogía de un pirata, 1791-1825, the siblings went to private school in their hometown of Cabo Rojo, where the young Roberto was mentored by Ignacio Venero. This figure is said to have taught him Roman Catholic catechism, literature and arithmetic, among other subjects. The young Cofresí is said to have displayed a particular interest in geography. Living in a coastal municipality, the brothers often came into contact with visiting sailors. They were inspired to become seamen by the tales that they heard from the sailors who visited their town. Cofresí eventually purchased a small boat. His brothers attempted to convince him to quit these ventures, but their requests were ignored. According to popular belief, his first vessel was known as El Mosquito or Relámpago, depending on the account. (Note: Mosquito was the name of a United States schooner captured by the Spanish corsair Fortuna while Joaquín "El Campechano" Hernánez served on board. It is possible that due to his subsequent appearances as a member of Cofresí's crew the boundary between events was lost and both were associated. Another possibility is that it was taken from "Mosquito Fleet", a colloquial name for the West Indies Squadron.)

Cofresí's physical appearance has been idealized, often being described as athletic, muscular, agile, with masculine traits and of medium height. However, as part this process he has also been differentiated from most contemporary Puerto Ricans, with multiple authors describing him as possessing blue eyes and curly blonde hair. Based on both tradition and the physical appearance of those related to him, historian Ursula Acosta supports this notion, stating that he most likely had blonde or brown hair and light-colored eyes. She also notes that the Ramírez de Arellano lineage also had a heavy Nordic origin. Some accounts incorrectly label him as tanned or mestizo, product of Taíno and Spanish bloodlines. These likely attempted to adapt Cofresí to what is now regarded as the common Puerto Rican ethnicity composed of Spanish, Taíno and African heritage. In 1846, reporter Freeman Hunt introduced several of these elements to his North American public by describing a scene that took place after the pirate's final arrest. He states that the authorities were surprised after finding a "handsome" young man with an "intelligent" and "very amiable" facial expression, who due to a "gentlemanly bearing" would "never have been taken for a murderer or a pirate". Besides emphasizing his brilliance and a "suavity of the Spanish manner", Hunt takes note of a reputation for "daring", "energy" and "celebrity".

Stories have linked him to a host of women, including an account where he serves as the lover of a Cacique's wife, despite the fact that by the 19th century the Taíno's domain had fallen apart. One particular tale names his lover "Ana", after his ship. These contradict historic documents that actually place Cofresí close to Juana throughout his life, offering no further evidence supporting this reputation. However, given the era's cultural approach and customs there is a possibility that he may have had several unrecorded lovers. This interpretation of Cofresí's personality found its way to the angloparlant media during the first half of the 20th century. The September 17, 1939, edition of The Milwaukee Sentinel relays an account in which the pirate crew capture a schooner that had several Spanish women as passengers. According to this story, the captured ship attempted to escape under the cover of darkness. However, the crew of the schooner was unfit to travel under stormy weather and the vessel came close to sinking. The account concludes with Cofresí defying the weather and rescuing the women, but not before charming them with his manners.

== Influence in modern culture ==
=== Oral tradition ===
Cofresí's life and death have inspired several myths and stories. These included those depicting him as a generous figure, who used to share what he stole with the region's poor population. In these myths he is generally described as a benevolent person, with authors writing about his supposed personality. Others take note of his purported sense of humor. In general, these portray him as a noble gentleman who became a pirate out of necessity or as a generous man, claiming that on one occasion he provided money for the upbringing of a baby girl that he had saved. Others depict a brave man, showing disregard for his life on several occasions. The "generous thief" archetype that is associated with Cofresí was predominant during the 19th century, being promoted by the romanticism present in the work of several prominent authors. Further influenced by an anti-establishment sentiment that arose from the dire conditions of the general population, the poor people quickly identified with these "rebels", "who were simply trying to make justice in an unfair social structure where the poor would always take the worst part". Shortly after his death, the popular songs that described his life painted his actions in a positive light, as "feats" instead of crimes. Another copla testifies how the general public praises his bravery, while labeling the authorities as cowards. However, the merchant class also had its own oral tradition, which portrayed him as a "tyrant" of the seas and celebrates that with him gone the business would be normalized. An example from Guayama claims that the pirates would bait the crews of passing vessels by disembarking at Cayo Caribe and posing as shipwrecked sailors, murdering them after the ships ran aground in the shallows. The Spanish government tried to create a parallel reputation, perpetuating Cofresí as a vile murder and thief. The American government fueled this, describing him as a "famous piratical chief" that ran a "bloodthirsty" leadership.

Axe in hand, Cofresí, followed by his crew, jumped with agility and quickly onto the boarded ship and attacked body by body the defenders of the brick. They were not prepared for an attack with a cold weapon. With the sound of three or four shots the tweendeck was clear. The sailors of the brigantine took refuge in the hold. Cofresí quickly seized the ship bringing death to the helmsman and a few sailors that remained on deck. Afterwards they closed the hatches trapping the rest of the brick's crew below deck. The Danish captain was besides the sail's pole, in a pool of blood, his head opened by an axe ...

— El pirata Cofresí by Cayetano Coll y Toste.

In modern oral tradition, the fact that no other pirate, regardless of nationality, has been said to recurrently share his loot with the poor is emphasized. With time, popular culture has come to grant Cofresí the quality of chivalry, describing him as a gentleman, especially with women. For example, the tradition at Aguada claims that Cofresí would share his loot and throw banquets in the municipality to gain the public's favor. According to these, due to this tendency a peak used as a lookout to oversee the Aguada Bay, Pico Atalaya, played a key role in the capture of the pirates. This contrast is further noted when rival pirates are portrayed as ruthless cutthroats, that only want to invade his territory. In reality, little is known about the interactions between Cofresí and other pirate groups, but a folktale claims that when another captain named Hermenegildo "El Tuerto" López attempted to plunder the Ana, he defeated them and adopted the survivors into his own crew. Another local story claims that Cofresí's career began forcefully, when he was shanghai'd into a crew after killing their captain. Cofresí is further dignified with accounts that place him freeing captive slaves during a time where slavery was both accepted and widespread. Besides the widespread notion that he was generous, folklore has also claimed that he would protect the weak, in particular children. Ibern Fleytas claims that Cofresí was also protective of his daughter, once confiscating a set of emerald earrings that another crew-member had given to her. He is also portrayed a fervent protector of women and guardian of their well being. Ultimately, the depiction of Cofresí fits within the same swashbuckler archetype seen in modern media, but precedes the genre's popularization in film by several years. The use of an ax or hatchet is seen frequently in oral tradition, to the point that the weapon is even named "Arturo" and described as an "inseparable friend". The axe is actually associated with Cabo Rojo, due to a territory dispute where its residents defended their land with said tool, and has since become the symbolic representation of its inhabitants. Its inclusion in the myths is likely meant to reflect the municipality's cultural identity. His physical appearance has been largely able to escape the modern stereotype of the pirates in popular culture, being rarely described with clichéd elements like an eye patch, large hat or a wooden leg.

Several of these oral stories deviate from the historical account and from each other. One particular aspect that is rarely consistent are the circumstances of his death, which has been described from a peaceful death along his wife in Caja de Muertos to mutiny or being hanged at Ponce or Humacao. The commander of a failed mission in search of some pirates, Ramón Aboy, has been said to be the one to capture him. Another prefers to say that Cofresí died by drowning, in an effort to deny the government any credit. Another notable contrast in the myths is that he is also often depicted as a man that was a pirate by choice, since belonging to a wealthy family meant that he had no economic need to do so, instead living as a pirate to donate the wealth. His birthplace is mostly correct, but some stories vary with Mayagüez and even the middle of the sea being mentioned. Even his background is inconsistent, with him being portrayed as both a member of an influential family and of a working low class family. There are other miscellaneous accounts, such as a moralistic story in which Cofresí confessed the location of his treasure to his lover while drunk, only for her to betray him and plunder it along another man. Even his ship and crew have been mystified. There are stories that depict the vessel as partially submersible and made from bamboo, which made it capable of easily ambushing potential victims. After his death, Juan Portugués became the subject of his own legend and part of Mona's folklore. Ramírez Brau details accounts that place Campechano dying in 1894, having lived to the age of 153 at Santo Domingo.

=== Cofresí's treasure ===
By intercepting merchant vessels that traveled from Europe to the West Indies, Cofresí is said to have gathered a significant amount of loot. To this day the location of his buried treasures remains a key aspect of the oral tradition surrounding his figure. In Puerto Rico, the undiscovered loot is said to be dispersed throughout the beaches in the west coast. The locations have been several, ranging from Cabo Rojo to Rincón. Specific beaches such as Guajataca, Puerto Hermina, Pico de Piedra or La Sardinera are mentioned depending the municipality where the stories originate. The lesser known Saona, a former pirate's nest, has been quoted as well. His treasure has been placed as far north as Añasco River's mouth and as far east as Tamarindo del Sur in Vieques, where fishermen reportedly saw boxes tied with chains. Some excavations have met moderate success near these places, with people retrieving a small quantities of silver and gold coins in Guaniquilla (part of southern Cabo Rojo), which further fueled the idea that a larger treasure could be nearby. Similar legends are recorded in the adjacent Aguada, where several stories claim that the Ana's water supply was taken from local water sources. Historian Pedro Vélez of the Aguada Museum claims that coin caches found in the municipality lend some credibility to these stories. During the 1950s, numerous excavation were held at Cayo Pirata in Culebra, which found Taíno remains. The same happened at the eponymous Cayo Cofresí, near the vicinity of Jobos Bay and Salinas, where native ceramics were excavated.

Few of these accounts agree with each other, but a ritual where he would kill a crewmember and leave his body besides the treasure is recurrent and seen in most accounts, even some with notable variations. These were promoted by Richard Winer, who in The Devil's Triangle 2 reported finding a small amount of coins in a vase next to a human skull during an expedition to Mona in 1957. Another story claims that while a countryman traversed a road to a nearby town, he encountered a well dressed man riding a white horse. While casually discussing the fate of Cofresí's treasure, the man began irradiating with a yellow light and revealed the location of it under an higüero. However, the countryman was terrified and only took a single gold coin, which he used to pay in a tavern that he frequented. The owner of the establishment asked where he found the coin and was told the entire account, ordering his sons to retrieve the treasure. When the countryman returned to the location, the treasure was gone.

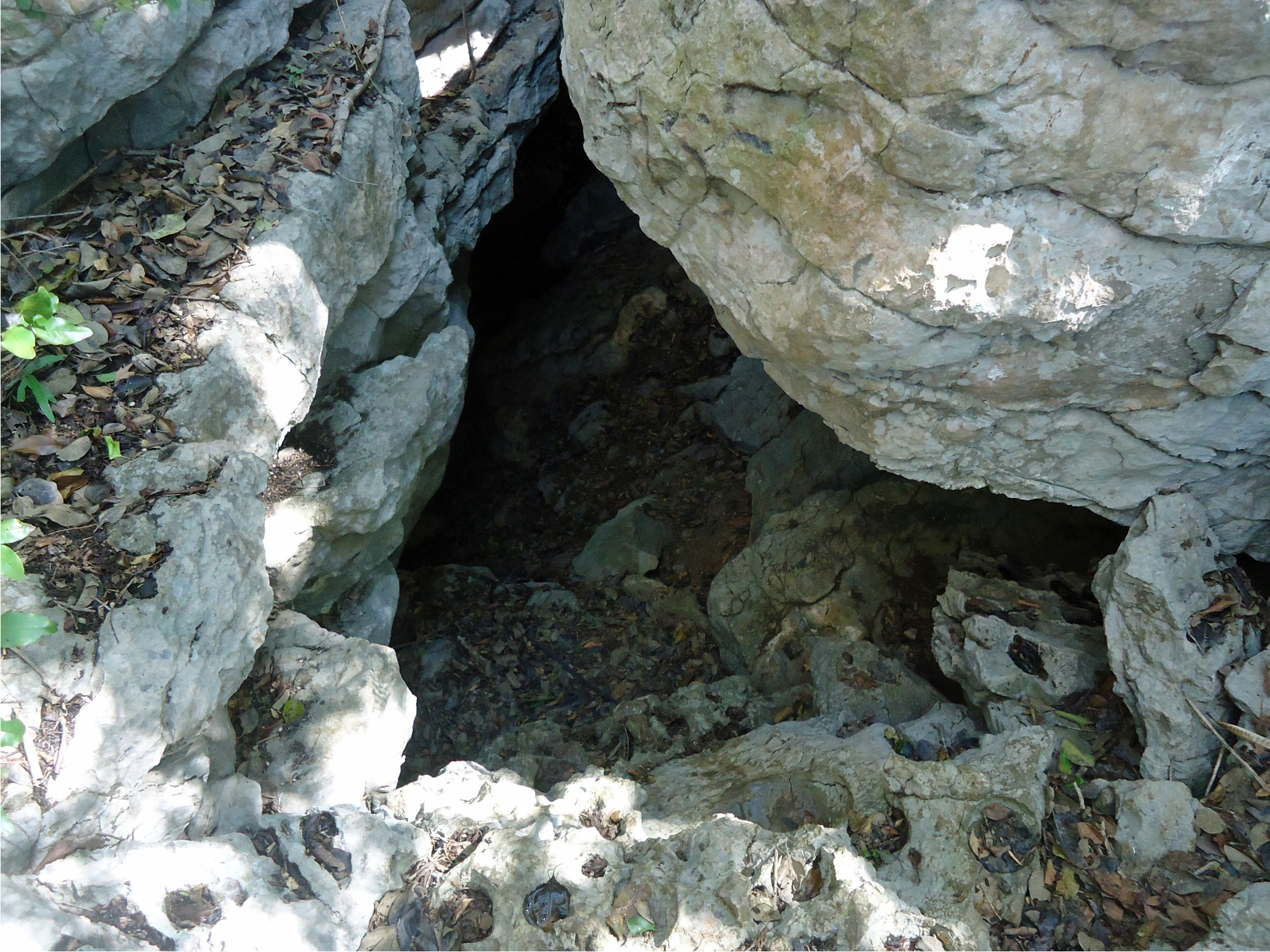
The entrance of Cueva Cofresí, known as Cofresí's Cave in English, an eponymous grotto found in Cabo Rojo which is frequently associated with purported hidden treasures.

A story claims that after boarding a ship in Aguada, he buried the treasure captured under a palm tree, as well as the body of a comrade that fell during that battle. According to this legend, the spirit of the dead pirate would guard it to this day. Another story elaborates on this version, claiming that Cofresí would ask his crew who wanted to guard the loot and if he noticed anyone being particularly enthusiastic, he would bring that person along him when he went ashore, murdering his companion and Burying him along with the treasure. An alternative presents him as a hoarder, placing everything in a large chest that was bound with chains (sometimes claimed to be made of gold), which he eventually cast into the sea, which still protects it to this day by turning rough when approached. Another version of this account claims that he would throw the chests in the sea along the head of a member of his crew, which as was the case in other myths, would guard them for eternity. If someone is lucky enough to find one of his treasures, it is said that bad luck or madness will follow them for the rest of their life.

Some legends were darker in nature. Among these, one claims that the chest containing the loot was hidden in the water under a Ceiba tree and was only visible while the light of the full moon directly illuminated it. According to this legend, the treasure was guarded by a school of fish that would constantly swim around it to keep it disguised under the murky water and were also capable of transforming into sharks, devouring any one that approached it when there was no moonlight and taking their souls to Davy Jones' Locker. A similar account has the pirate baiting a woman named Yadira with an illusion of a jewel encrusted bracelet, only to be dragged underwater by a shadow and become the guard fish herself. Death was also said to be the price for looting a chest hidden at the El Ojo del Buey, a rock formation in Dorado. A myth from Aguadilla, says that when a fisherman tried to retrieve a treasure buried in the sector of Playitas, Cofresí's soul manifested itself as a bull and tried to prevent the liberation of the pirate that had been left behind as guardian. In Cabo Rojo, folklore claims that his treasure might be buried at the end of an anchor's chain, but that when trying to pull it out with bulls, the animals won't budge after perceiving the presence of death nearby. Another claimed that at Poza Clara in Isabela there was a large loot, but that the only way to reach it was to sacrifice a newborn at the site, an action that would cause the water to part and allow access to the area without interacting with its guardian soul.

Outside Puerto Rico, there are similar accounts. El Uvero in Mona is supposed to hold a treasure waiting to be discovered. A second account explores the notion that Cofresí killed a crewmate when burying loot, claiming that after noticing that Hermenegildo "El Tuerto" López was planning to kill him, he took the initiative and murdered him instead, throwing the body on top of the chest that they intended to hide. Several caves located on that island such as Cueva del Pirata and Cueva Esqueleto have been associated with the pirates. In the Dominican Republic, the pirates are purported to have buried treasure in several locations. Among the places listed are Gran Estero in Santo Domingo, where he is supposed to have hidden a large amount of loot, Bahía Escocesa, Río San Juan, Sosúa, Cabarete, Puerto Plata and Maimión. These legends claim that Cofresí would leave hints so that he could retrieve them, which included planting recognizable trees nearby. Other accounts list other distinctions, including a series of silver medallions engraved with the initials "R.C." or a chain that emerged from the sea and went into the jungle. Throughout the Dominican Republic, there are supposedly nearly 30 locations where loot was buried along these medallions, most of which remain undiscovered.

=== Cofresí and the supernatural ===
The soldiers followed them: they went on the defense: then the second, who was a Portuguese named Cofresin lost his hand and took a mortal wound in the head from which he died. Several of the crew were wounded, also the Captain, who along the others escaped: six were made prisoners, who equal to the dead Portuguese, were conducted to Mayagüez.

— Article announcing the supposed death of Cofresí

Several legends grant Cofresí a connection to the supernatural. Historian Roberto Fernández Valledor argues that a letter published in El Colombiano erroneously claiming that he was killed might have been a catalyst for these. According to this report the coronel in command of the Spanish military in the west half of Puerto Rico, comprised by the regions of Ponce through Arecibo, ordered an incursion in Mona. A small boat with a crew of 20 was sent, but as soon as the pirates noticed it they docked in the coast and ran inland. According to the letter, the soldiers pursued the pirates and managed to maim and kill one of them, which was misidentified as a "Portuguese named Cofresin". However, the document also notes how despite receiving some injuries, several of the pirates including their captain (presumably the actual Cofresí) managed to escape. The body of the misidentified victim, was transported to Mayagüez, where its head and severed hand were placed on display. His nationality was misreported because he was also confused with José Joaquín Almeida, a Portuguese privateer that was known by the nickname of "El Portugués", who was executed at San Juan years later. Six other pirates were captured and sent to the mainland along the body. Similarly, a late 19th-century author and poet named Félix Matos Bernier used the pen name "Cofresí", despite still remaining under the domain of the same Spanish authorities that executed him. This might have fueled the rumors that the pirate still roamed Puerto Rico.

Other myths and stories describe Cofresí as an evil or demonic figure. Among them there are myths that claim that during his life he had sold his soul to the devil in order to "defeat men and be loved by women". According to legend, Cofresí maldijo (placed a curse on) Captain Sloat and the USS Grampus before he died. In 1848, the schooner was lost at sea with all hands aboard. However, Captain Sloat was not among those who perished, he went on to become the Commander of the Norfolk Navy Yard. Accounts of apparitions of his spirit include versions claiming that when summoned in medium sections, the strength of Cofresí's spirit was excessive, to the point of killing some of the hosts he possessed. An article authored by Margarita M. Ascencio and published in Fiat Lux, a magazine published in Cabo Rojo, notes that several persons in that municipality have said that they have witnessed the pirate's spirit. This was explained in an account stating that the reason for these is that his soul can not rest until somebody finds one of his buried chests. And so, every seven years he appears on seven consecutive nights, looking for someone to free him of this curse. According to this tradition, he appears engulfed in flames and has been witnessed by several fishermen in Aguada. Another claims that he possessed a mystical characteristic known as "Capilares de María", a series of capillaries arranged in unique fashion in one of his arms and which rendered him immortal, being able to even survive being stabbed through the heart. Folklore also lists the Bioluminescent Bay of the adjacent La Parguera as a favored route of escape, citing that he would sail into the illuminated waters while his pursuers would disengage, fearing some sort of supernatural influence in what they believed to be a cursed area. In the Dominican Republic, folktales attribute magic abilities to Cofresí, who has been referred to as a mystic; these say that he was able to make his boat disappear when surrounded or that he was resuscitated by wicked forces after his death. This was based on a hideout that he had established in a cave located in a nearby beach. Some even suggest that he was reincarnated in another body after dying.

=== Origin and retribution stories ===
The reasons behind Cofresí's turn toward piracy are unclear, but most popular theories ignore his previous criminal record and propose alternative motivations. For example, Cofresí is popularly said to have worked a route between Puerto Rico and the Dominican Republic for some time, until a Spanish vessel stole his goods in a move that is purported to have influenced his move towards piracy. A variant of this tale blames the Spanish Civil Guard, which is also made responsible for the death of his girlfriend. An alternative theory blames the British. This one, presented by historian Ramón Ibern Fleytas, claims that Cofresí attempted to sell fish and fruit to the crew of a brigantine. However, since the sailors did not understand Spanish they mocked these intentions and pushed him off the boat, precipitating a fall. Despite this incident, Cofresí was stated to continue as a merchant. He was subsequently recruited to deliver several documents to another British ship, since the vessels' captain had forgotten them at customs. Cofresí completed this task, but was still assaulted by one of the sailors when he picked some sugar from a barrel. A few days later, another ship rammed his ship and damaged it. According to this version, the sailors aboard ignored his requests for help, forcing him to swim to the coast by himself. These acts are said to have pushed him towards a life of piracy. Like the rest of the oral tradition, the actual accounts contradict each other and depending on the story he would become a pirate for something as pedestrian as other fishermen stealing his haul to serious transgressions. The latter class includes features such as the rape of his sister and the murder of his father or son.

In 1846, Boston Traveller reporter Freeman Hunt published a short biography in Hunt's Merchants' Magazine describing an account of Cofresí's life that was purportedly narrated by the pirate himself. According to this version "his father was a gentleman of wealth, but was cheated out of it", precipitating the young man to adopt a life of gambling and piracy "to get back what the world owed him". Despite these inclinations, Hunt notes that Cofresí was well educated and describes him as possessing an "eye of remarkable brilliancy", which was reflected in an "intelligent countenance", who even expressed disdain in the lack of bravery that the average member of his crew exhibited. This biography includes an origin story, where he began plundering aboard a canoe with two black men as his crew, only to be dragged to the Dominican Republic during a storm, where he was placed in jail. There Cofresí gained the thrust of the jailer's wife and daughter, who would request him to do menial tasks and treat him as a member of the family. After waiting for a year, he is said to have employed another storm as a distraction to escape along his crew, docking at the Mona Passage for food before eventually returning to Cabo Rojo. From there the pirate took a "large boat" with his original underlings and forced the sailors to join them. According to Hunt, Cofresí adopted a rule specifying that "no witnesses [were allowed] to remain unless they joined his crew", which made their number grow in a fashion that allowed them to secure some "rich captures" early, which they "gambled away" before returning to sea for more. This author notes that this tendency would backfire, recounting an instance where the authorities were alerted about the pirate's presence in a covert gaming house in the woods of Cabo Rojo, stealthily mobilizing a captain and twenty soldiers during the night. Being the only one to act on intuition, Cofresí is said to have jumped out of a window, only managing to escape after clearing a seven-foot fence.

Popular beliefs state that Cofresí was influenced by the secessionist faction which was supporting Puerto Rico's independence from Spain. According to these accounts, he felt that the Spaniards were oppressing the Puerto Ricans in their own home and then began assaulting Spanish ships, particularly those that were being used to export local resources such as gold, as well as American and English vessels that visited the local ports to trade. Cofresí would do this in order to debilitate the Spanish economy, justifying it by allegedly saying that he "wouldn't allow foreign hands to take a piece of the country that saw his birth". In a twist to the British origin theory, his move towards piracy has also been blamed on the United States and said to have originated when he was once caught eating sugar from an American cargo ship without paying, being injured by the ship's captain. Authors from the 19th century fed off this theory, writing that Cofresí generally ignored the ships that came from other nations including those from France, the Netherlands and England, with his attacks being mainly focused on ships from the United States. According to these depictions, Cofresí had declared war on all of those that operated under the flag of the United States. He is portrayed displaying a cruel behavior against hostages that were on these vessels, including an interpretation where he ordered that his captives were to be nailed alive to El Mosquito's deck. In reality, Spain and the United States were experiencing diplomatic and political differences, therefore the administrators of the colonial government would not pursue Cofresí or his crew as long they assaulted American ships. The government would interpret such actions as patriotic, due to the collateral effect of disrupting the trade of its adversary.

=== Tributes and homages ===
In Puerto Rico, several places are named after Cofresí. Playa Cofi in Vieques was named in his honor, since he was known to frequent the island and sail its waters. Cayo Pirata near Ensenada Honda in Culebra is named after the pirate, having also served as a brief hideout. Supposedly a series of excavations near its vicinity retrieved gold coins (mostly Spanish doubloons) and jewels. Cofresí's Cave is located in a sector of Cabo Rojo called Barrio Pedernales found south of Boquerón, which also hosts a plaza named after him. According to local legend, after Cofresí shared some of his treasure with his family and friends, he would hide what was left over in this grotto. Throughout the years no one has found any treasure in the cave. A similar tale surrounds another cavern, Cueva de las Golondrinas, located in Aguadilla. Another example of "Cofresí's Cove" is found at Boca de Yuma in the La Altagracia province of the Dominican Republic, where several such homages are found. North of this place is the eponymous town of Cofresí, found ten kilometers west of Puerto Plata. This province also features Playa Cofresí, which was named to serve as a tourist trap, with the intent of attracting foreigners that were interested in the legends despite the fact that no historical accounts place the pirates near its vicinity.

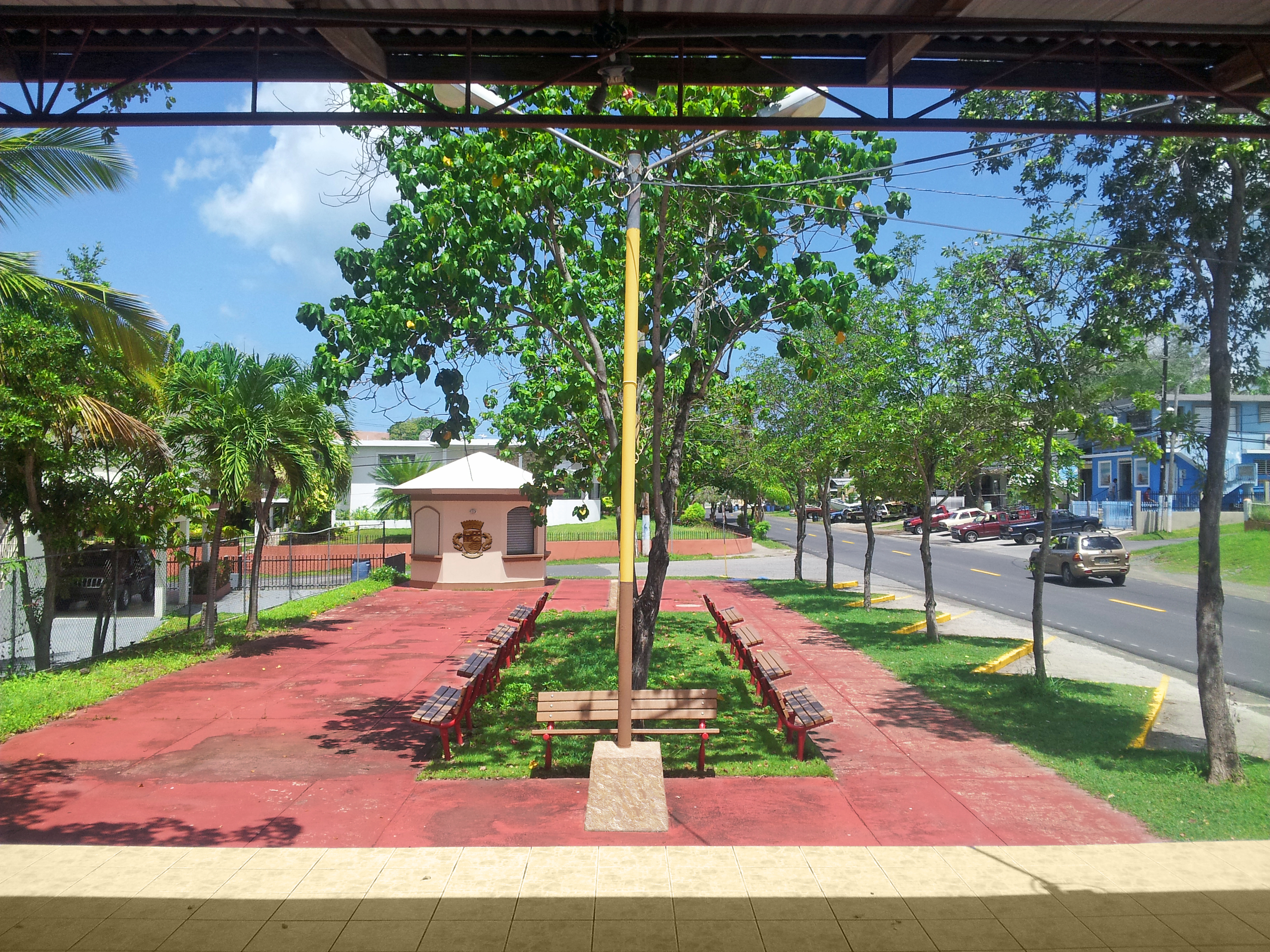
The vertical perspective of a small public plaza named after Cofresí in Boquerón, Cabo Rojo.

Local lore claims that among the hideouts used by Cofresí was a fortress located in Quebradillas, Puerto Rico. The small structure was constructed in the 18th century in the Puerto Hermina beach, serving as a storage building for Spanish customs where materials that entered through the local port were held. According to these legends, the pirates would use the merchant activity to pass unnoticed and use the rivers to go inland, where they hid the plundered treasure inside sewer systems. Employing this tendency for smuggling in his favor, Cofresí supposedly used this fortress as his strategic base and was supported by the local population, which he rewarded for its support. The remains of the stone masonry structure still stand in the coast, having become a tourist attraction due to the mysticism surrounding it. To this day, the municipality of Quebradillas is nicknamed La guarida del pirata (lit. "The pirate's hideout") and several of its sports teams are named after these stories, including its most notable one, the Baloncesto Superior Nacional's Piratas de Quebradillas.

In his native Cabo Rojo, he is honored by the Roberto Cofresí Soccer Club (affiliated to the Liga Nacional de Fútbol) and the Roberto Cofresí Cup, both in the discipline of association football. In 1972, the Cofresí Motorcycle Club was also established in this municipality. Other kinds of tributes have been made to commemorate Cofresí both locally and internationally. In Puerto Rico, a monument in his image was built by José Buscaglia Guillermety in Boquerón Bay. This made Cabo Rojo the first municipality in Hispanic America to erect a statue commemorating a pirate. Despite the fact that tributes within the aviation industry are scarce, the few examples that cite Cofresi's name have been linked to notable events. Puertorriqueña de Aviación, the earliest flag carrier company recorded in Puerto Rico, christened its first seaplane with the cognomen of "Kofresí". In the only copycat crime dedicated to his name, Antulio Ramírez Ortíz adopted the pseudonym "Elpirata Cofresí" when he seized control of National Airlines' Flight 337 and redirected it to Cuba by holding the pilot hostage with a knife. This was the first act of air piracy that involved an American airline in the history of the United States.

=== Literature and fine arts ===
Pedro Tomás de Córdova was the first to publish a formal book where Cofresí figured as a topic, recounting the pirate's career in his 1832 Memorias geográficas, históricas, económicas y estadísticas de la isla de Puerto Rico. However, in 1946 Fernando José Géigel notes in Corsarios y piratas de Puerto Rico his belief that the Spanish manipulated the reports employed by his predecessor. Among the works created by Alejandro Tapia y Rivera, the most notable Puerto Rican playwright of the 19th century, was the first novel based on the life of Cofresí. The eponymous narrative was directly based on Memorias and was initially released as a serial in a magazine named La Azucena on October 31, 1875, before being gathered in a volume the following year. In this work, the pirate undergoes a pseudo-deification, receiving abilities rivaling those of a Homeric hero such as commanding the wind with a simple whisper. An early example of a fictional novel is Ricardo del Toro Soler's 1897 Huracán: novela basada en la leyenda del pirata Roberto Cofresí. Since then, Cofresí has been the subject of numerous biographical books which include El Marinero, Bandolero, Pirata y Contrabandista Roberto Cofresí by Walter R. Cardona Bonet; El Mito de Cofresí en la Narrativa Antillana by Roberto Fernandez Valledor and Roberto Cofresí: El Bravo Pirata de Puerto Rico by Edwin Vázquez. Despite being a historical biography, Historia y Genealogía del pirata Roberto Cofresí by Ramírez Brau employed the symbolism of pirates in popular culture.

In 1934, Bienvenido G. Camacho published El Aguila Negra; ó Roberto Cofresí: intrépido pirata puertorriqueño, el terror de los navegantes., a book that claimed to be a historical account of Cofresí's life, but was actually a fictional novel. Corsario: Última Voluntad y Testamento Para La Posteridad del Capitán Don Roberto Cofresí y Ramírez de Arellano de Cabo Rojo by Luis Ascencio Camacho, El caribe huele a pólvora: La verdad sobre un corsario llamado Roberto Cofresí by Joaquín Rozas Joaco and ¡Cofresí en Armas! ¡Presente! by Osvaldo Torres Santiago are semi-fictional and based on the research of its authors. Other pieces of historical fiction are directed towards a juvenile audience. Painter Roland Borges Soto has published a series of works including the coloring books The boy who dreamed of being a Pirate: Cofresi's Treasures and Piratas: Coloring Book, as well as a novel titled Último Pirata del Caribe: Cofresí. Poet Georgina Lázaro wrote Leyendas del Oeste de la Isla: El Pirata Cofresi y El Milagro de Hormigueros, which introduces the mythical aspects of the pirate to this audience. A comic adaptation was published by José A. Rabelo in 2011. El Corsario Cofresí: Héroe Puertorriqueño, by Josefina Barceló Jiménez and Midiam Astacio Méndez, reinterprets the theory that Cofresi could have been a privateer in a children-friendly manner.

Several foreign authors have also depicted him in their works, notably those from the adjacent Dominican Republic. In La gloria llamó dos veces, author Julio González Herrera offers a tale that links the pirate with one of that country's most iconic figures, Juan Pablo Duarte, which serves as a reflection of the impact that he retained throughout the Caribbean. In a similar context, fellow Dominican Francisco Carlos Ortea published El tesoro de Cofresí, which follows a modern family that travels to Mona and finds a hidden treasure. However, this influence has expanded beyond Latin American countries, reaching Europe in the form of Germany, where Angelika Mechtel published Das Kurze Heldenhafte Leben Des Don Roberto Cofresí. In 1999, Robert L. Muckley collaborated with Adela Martínez-Santiago on Stories from Puerto Rico, which translated some popular legends into English. David K. Stone and Lee Cooper wrote a book titled The Pirate of Puerto Rico, which offers a fictional account that was aimed to portray the Cofresí as a positive role model to English-speaking children. The pirate also plays a prominent role in the 2014 romance novel Wind Raven, authored by Regan Walker. The pirate also plays secondary parts in other works. In Anthony Bjorklund's I Just Had To Go Back To Di Island his treasures serve as a plot element. Reyna Ramírez-Arellano, a major character of Rick Riordan's The Blood of Olympus, is portrayed as a descendant of Cofresí and Marion Frederic Ramírez de Arellano.

Roberto, because you are a symbol of our race, and through its veins all sort of romantic madness is baked, my romance feeds off your legend and fame, and in assonant rhymes I served it laid in pages so that one day, my people can drink it ... And it reaches their soul.

— Romancero de Cofresí by Gustavo Palés Matos (1942)

Several short stories detailing legends have been published in compendiums. An early example of these was Cayetano Coll y Toste's '1928 book Leyendas Puertorriqueñas. This novel was adapted for theater as Leyendas Puertorriqueñas de Cayetano Coll y Toste by general director of the Ateneo Puertorriqueño Roberto Ramos Perea and debuted on November 29, 2010. In 1973, his granddaughter Isabel Cuchí Coll published a similar piece named Un patriota y un pirata. Defunct newspaper, El Imparcial distributed a series of folkloric accounts, among which was a story titled Cofresí authored by José Luis Vivas Maldonado. Pueblos Hispanos, a weekly publication based in New York, dedicated a section to the analytical work, El Buen Borincano. In Cuentos de la tierra y cuentos del mar, Néstor A. Rodríguez Escudero includes three different narratives. Some of these publications where even used in public instruction. In 1926, professor Paulino Rodríguez published Gotas del estío, which included a brief work titled La caja de Cofresí. A story written by Juan B. Huyke for his book Cuentos y leyendas was selected by the Puerto Rico Department of Public Instruction for Secretos y Maravillas, which was used in public schools. Another titled El Puerto Rico Ilustrado, published several notes that discuss the topic, including a short story titled Palabra de militar by Vicente Palés Matos, which portrays the life of the pirate from the perspective of the people and politicians involved. The first crossover of the legends into English literature was carried out by John Alden Mason and Aurelio M. Espinosa, who first published it in the Journal of American Folklore and eventually compiled it in a book titled Porto Rican Folklore: Folk-tales in 1929.

In 1934, he was the topic of a nine-act play titled El Tesoro del Pirata. Between 1944 and 1945, another play written by Edna Coll was staged in the University of Puerto Rico's Río Piedras Campus, where it won the first place on a theater contest. In the 1940s, Rafael Hernández Marín, one of the most notable composers in Puerto Rico during the 20th century, presented an operetta simply titled Cofresí. Luis Palés Matos collaborated with the script based on the novel by Tapia. The musical was first staged on December 21, 1949, at Teatro Tapia in San Juan. Nearly 30 years after, the Puerto Rican Zarzuela and Operetta Foundation held a second function. However, afterwards it was lost with time. The operetta was reinterpreted in 2013 for the Interamerican University of Puerto Rico's 100th anniversary, with a script based on the original by Gustavo Palés Matos and adapted by Pablo Cabrera. The cast was heavily local, led by Rafael Dávila as Cofresí and counting with Elaine Ortiz Arandes, Manolo González, Guido Lebrón, Ilca López and Gil René as support cast. With the help of Rafael's son, Alejandro "Chalí" Hernández, the work had to be reconstructed from remnants of the original version, with the process taking two years. Directed by Roselin Pabón, the play was recorded live by the Puerto Rico Symphony Orchestra for an eponymous album produced by Julio Bagué along Gerardo Lopez, Alfonso Ordoñez, Juan Cristobal Losada and Michael Bishop. The production was nominated in the "Best Classical Album" category of the Latin Grammy Awards of 2013. Cofresí ... O un bubulú caribeño, a musical written by José Luis Ramos Escobar and featuring choreography by José Félix Gómez debuted at the theatre of the University of Puerto Rico on November 3, 1990. The play featured talent from the campus' drama department and was headlined by Gustavo Rodríguez, Marcos Garay, Sonia Gándia, Julio Augusto Cintrón, Tony Váldes, Víctor Corrian and Miguel Morales, with scenography by Cheko Cuevas and wardrobe by Gloria Sáez. In 2007, a play based on Cofresi was presented at the Distrito Federal in Mexico. On October 30, 2011, the Western Ballet Theatre debuted Howard Phillips's El Pirata Cofresí at the Theatre Festival held at Caguas, Puerto Rico.

Cofresí has also been the inspiration behind a number of paintings. Besides the common canvas representation, the pirate has also been featured in other mediums. In 1971, Rafael Rivera Garcia painted a mural titled "El Pirata Cofresí", which was restored in 2002 with the patronage of the Interamerican University of Puerto Rico. The artwork was installed in the library of that the Bayamón campus of institution and re-inaugurated along a new painting. Other pieces use the pirate as an allegory, while depicting a scene that requires critical analysis to establish a connection. Among the earliest of these is José R. Oliver's 1961 acrylic painting "Barquitos de Pápel". The work itself features a single paper ship sailing away from (or towards, depending on perspective) an origami flotilla of three identical vessels, all of which is happening in a tranquil and rocky waterside setting. Despite not being immediately apparent, Oliver was actually depicting a naval engagement between Cofresí and corsairs, from which the pirate emerged victorious. Another example is a piece of expressionist art bearing his name and elaborated by Ibsen Espada.

=== Sociohistorical and subjective analysis ===
During the 20th century, the interest in the romanticism of Cofresí turned towards formal study. In 1914, Agustín Navarrete presented his research on the mystification of the pirate's figure during a presentation titled "La piratería combatida en Puerto Rico", which was later adapted into a book. Based on his actions and the political environment of his time, the possibility that Cofresí may have been an insurgent privateer instead of a pirate has also been explored, both by historians and in narratives. His career as a pirate coincided directly with Simón Bolívar's independence movement, which gathered the participation of figures from several other Latin American countries and colonies, reaching Puerto Rico in the figure of Antonio Valero de Bernabé. In 1819, this campaign resulted in the creation of the Republic of Colombia, now known as Gran Colombia, in its original constitution. This country emerged from direct conflict against the Spanish Empire and soon became antagonized by the postures of the United States. Both Cuba and Puerto Rico were listed by Bolívar as future targets for his movement, but this was mostly deterred due to internal problems within Colombia. Citing a source from the United States as support for this theory, Juan Antonio Corretjer noted how he believed that under these circumstances, Cofresí's own interest influenced him to join this revolution by working as privateer for Bolívar. It has been proposed that among his cooperations with this campaign, he may have donated captured ships during the ongoing Venezuelan War of Independence.

In a study discussing the transition of Puerto Rico's society from mostly rural to predominantly urban, sociologist Ángel Quintero Rivera notes that Cofresí's capture put a symbolic end to the era of the marronage. This term refers to a time period dominated by wealthy European landowners, when slaves that were brought from Africa would escape the Haciendas and settle down in uninviting terrains. Quintero emphasizes that in this early rural setting, the Maroons were the first laborer class to exist within the local society. He also notes that the 19th century brought changes that ultimately brought an end to this model. Quintero concludes that "[the] capture of Cofresi [sic] represents the last fatal blow to the dying world of marronage, of [Puerto Rico's] first peasantry." Soon afterwards, centralized commerce would take over as economic model. Another of his possible motivations has also been analyzed. In the comedic work The Code of the Zombie Pirate: How to Become an Undead Master of the High Seas, satirist Scott Kenemore discusses how Cofresí and other notorious pirates decided to baptize their ships with names that do not sound threatening, in direct contrast to their reputation. El Mosquito is mentioned among several other examples, including Bartholomew Roberts' Little Ranger and several of Edward Low's vessels such as Fancy, Rose Pink and Merry Christmas. In line with the comedic tone of the book, the author questions if this ironic naming was a display of machismo or if it was done intentionally, so that sailors would avoid facing them just to prevent the ridicule of reporting their loss to a ship with an inoffensive name.

In Piracy, Globalization and Marginal Identities: Navigating Gender and Nationality in Contemporary Hispanic Fiction, Alana B. Reid notes how the narratives based on Cofresí differ from the mainstream format seen in other Spanish work. These were mostly used in a political manner that either served as propaganda for the Spanish Empire or to cast their opponents as villains. As a rebel hometown hero, Cofresí's depiction is an antithesis of the norm. She also lists how it differs from contemporary pirate literature, where the authors choose to depict pirates that share their own cultural identity as vile and unredeemable characters. This is the case with angloparlant writers J. M. Barrie and Robert Louis Stevenson, who created the villainous figures of Captain Hook and Long John Silver. She traces this depiction of Cofresí as a righteous pirate to Tapia y Rivera, who portrays him as a moral man who had trouble retaining his faith in a world filled with injustice. Reid links this to the fledgling Puerto Rican nationalism during the 19th century, with subsequent authors adopting the same editorial line during the next century as a way to reinforce a now established identity that continues in conflict with an ambiguous political status. To this end, he has also been depicted wielding the machete, a weapon commonly associated with Puerto Rican nationalism and resistance.

Social historian Alice M. del Toro Ruiz agrees with Reid's assessment in an essay titled La narrativa fundacional: Cofresí de Alejandro Tapia y Rivera (1876). She calls the work of this author an "identity fable" that is part of Puerto Rico's fundamental fiction. In 2014, Wladimir Márquez Jiménez prepared a thesis discussing the contrasts between Tapia's Cofresí and Ricardo del Toro Soler's Huracán. This author divides the literary depictions of Cofresí in three classes: autonomist, independentist and anti-imperialist. He notes that these are product of the desire to reflect present problems in an early 19th-century narrative. The publishing of a second edition of Cofresí and the reappearance of its serial version in the political publications El Mundo, Pueblos Hispanos and Alma Latina between 1943 and 1945, is seen as a reflection of the prominence that the status issue was gaining. Márquez Jiménez argues that the third edition of Tapia's work was published under similar conditions in 1968. The author struggles to classify this depiction of Cofresí in a manner that would adapt to the work of others, such as Nina Gerassi Navarro or Juan Pablo Dabove, instead noting that he "is something else". After contrasting it to American and British depictions, Márquez concludes that the pirate's conversion ends the novel on a positive note despite the death of the main character. This, combined with the death of the more violent and rebellious character of Caín, is interpreted by the author as a call for diplomacy.

When reviewing Huracán, Márquez notes that the book was published and received awards in Ponce, then the epicenter of the autonomist and independentist movements. The novel was also published in a time when the conflicts that eventually led to the Spanish–American War were at its height, and the author believes that its narrative was directed towards those that saw an ally in the United States, noting that in essence they were after the same imperial goals as Spain. Márquez states that the pirate's motives are portrayed in two different fronts, the local and international scenarios, with a hint of mystification labeling him as the first Puerto Rican rebel. Like Reid, the author soon notices the contrast between this etic representation of the pirate and the cutthroat stereotypes of contemporary literature. Ultimately, this version of Cofresí portrays a "champion of the Puerto Rican cause" that faces off against the Imperial powers of the era, with the virtue of valor being represented as fundamental beyond social classes, a symbol of Del Toro's desire to promote a collective alliance. As was the case with Tapia's Cofresí, here the death of the pirate serves to create this multisectorial union. Márquez concludes that both authors used their books to argue for a solution to Puerto Rico's status as a colony of Spain, but that Tapia's work inclined towards negotiating while Del Toro emphasized the need for resistance.

Janice Hume studied a different tendency in a paper titled The Buccaneer as Cultural Metaphor: Pirate Mythology in Nineteenth-Century American Periodicals, which was presented at the 84th Annual Meeting of the Association for Education in Journalism and Mass Communication held in 2001. The study focuses on the influence of pirates in the advent of sensational crime coverage during this timeframe and its impact on the public consciousness and popular culture. In it, Hume notes how Hezekiah Niles' Weekly Register adopted a hard-line approach when it came to piracy, actively lobbying to promote the death sentence as its only punishment and opposing a resolution that was proposed in the United States Senate that would modify this custom. In order to further this goal, the capture, execution and purported gibbeting of his crew was highlighted. However, Hume notices a subtle change in the tone of the article when it comes to the defiant honesty in Cofresí's last words, as if "the Register seemed to admit a grudging respect for the death of the leader of this gang".

=== Miscellaneous ===
Outside his reputation as a pirate, Cofresí has also been directly linked to the creation of what later became the official beverage of Puerto Rico, the piña colada. According to this account, when the crew's morale was low, he would mix them a beverage that contained coconut, pineapple and white rum. This connection has been commercially exploited by different elements of the alcohol industry. In 2014, California-based The Bruery introduced a piña colada variant of the traditional American sour ale and named it "El Pirata Cofresí" after this legend. During the 20th century, a rum brand adopted his patronymic as its namesake. Ron Kofresí was distributed in Puerto Rico and was merchandised in a bottle that depicted a stereotypical pirate, wearing a large black hat, belts, and wielding a sword and a gun around his waist. Since then the namesake has been used by other distilleries, including Dominican-produced Ron Cofresí and the New York-based Cofresí Rum Company.

Although they didn't name the product after him, Bacardi exploited the legends of his purported treasure in a viral campaign used to launch Ron Orbucán in the market of Levante, Spain. The company hid a reward in the island of Tabarca and then commissioned advertising agency Seis Grados to create a mock-up legend. The organization granted control of the campaign to publicist Cira López, who in 2005 created a fake blog named El tesoro del Orbucán where she posed as a college student named "Iván Fuentes". Under this persona, López claimed to have found an encrypted diary, discussing the hints hidden in a book purportedly authored by Edgar J. Howles, a disciple of Howard Pyle, and requested help decoding it. The document published online was populated with covert hints of the reward's location and narrated the fictional encounter of a Spanish friar named Pietro Benincasa with Cofresí at Málaga. The conclusion of the story depicts the pirates escaping from the authorities and taking control of a galleon full of gold, the location of which was purportedly hidden and the map to it given to the friar before they boarded a schooner and left Spain with the Armada in pursuit. López then claimed that in 1942 an American named Thomas Hearne deciphered the hints with the help of a cryptologist uncle named William R. Newbold and found the treasure in Cabo Rojo, from where he took it to Cádiz. The following year, the agency the took a multimedia approach, involving journalists and street marketing. The reward was found on June 1, 2007, with the final reference to the pirates being the real reward, a dagger made of gold and worth €11,000.

Other products and services have been merchandised under the "Cofresí" brand, including belts, terrace building companies and a brand of windows named Grand Corsair. Furthermore, countless businesses have used the pirate's reputation to attract customers. There are schools, bakeries, small inns, hotels, grocery stores, bars and villas bearing his name. Restaurants Villa Cofresí in Rincón and la Guarida del Pirata in Toa Baja are among the most notorious. His name is also used by brands in other markets including presses, clothing and costume lines and ointments to alleviate rheumatism. Non-commercially, a pirate outfit inspired by his legends and incorporating some stereotypical elements was created by designer Carlos Alberto for Miss Puerto Rico 2007 Uma Blasini. The piece was featured during Miss Universe 2007's National Costume Presentation. This trend even made its way to the United States, where an international moving and hauling company, Agencia Cofresí, was named after him. The name holds such notoriety, that Enrique Laguerre once considered writing a book based on his life but intended to rename the protagonist "Roberto Caribe", to avoid exploiting Cofresí's reputation. The author immediately noticed how the work lost its merchantability. Cofresí was the inspiration for numerous folk songs, which reached the commercial music industry via Italian singer Tony Croatto and were also recorded as a bilingual rock opera by Pedro Candelaria.

The very first cinematographic company was Cine Puerto Rico established in 1912, which produced films until going bankrupt in 1917. After this organization closed, renowned poet Lloréns Torres purchased its production materials and created his own entity, Cine Tropical. After his first film was a success, Llorens programmed a series of projects. The first scheduled was Los misterios de Cofresí, also known as El Tesoro de Cofresí, which was meant to be released in the chapter play format. However, the filming was stopped in mid-production when the lead actor, Aquiles Zorda, suddenly left Puerto Rico and did not return. The onset of World War I prevented the continuation of Cine Tropical, which was now unable to import materials, and the movie was never finished. In 1919, Juan Emilio Viguié began filming another production titled La Vida de Cofresí. The municipality of Ponce served as setting, but like its predecessor the film could not be completed. Another attempt was made in 1973 when Boquerón Films, Inc. employed several actors and began a study of the myths in Cabo Rojo. Anecdotes were recorded in order to prepare a script. A completed film was exhibited during the 1980s, but its content was mostly fictitious.

== Flags of Cofresí ==
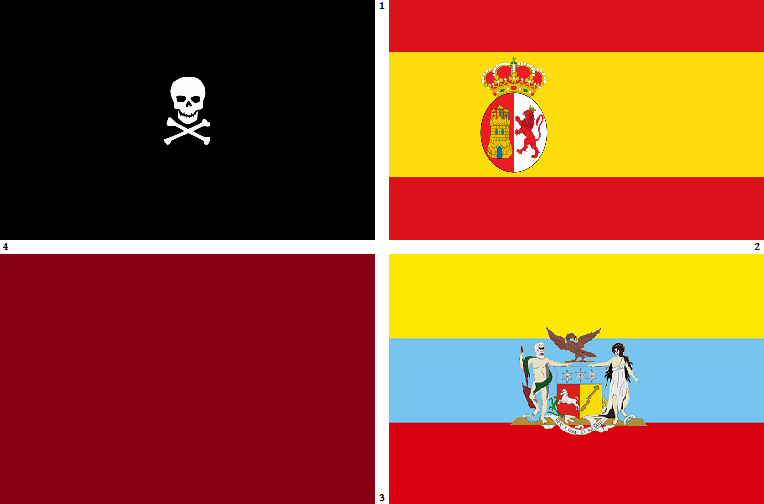
A collection of flags that have been associated with Cofresí. Clockwise: 1) The stereotypical Jolly Roger. 2) The naval flag of the Kingdom of Spain. 3) The flag of Gran Colombia. 4) The red flag associated with social resistance during the 19th century.

When Spain issued a decree blocking foreign countries from trading, selling or buying merchandise in its Caribbean colonies, the entire region became engulfed in a power struggle among the naval superpowers. The newly independent United States later became involved in this scenario, complicating the conflict. As a consequence, Spain increased the issuing of privateering contracts, a development that was in turn exploited by pirates. In the midst of this chaos, Cofresí freely hoisted the flags of Spain and Colombia, sailing under them with the intent of approaching unsuspecting ships before plundering their cargo. He was known to use this tactic in attacks that took place in the coastlines of Ponce, Fajardo, Vieques, Peñuelas, Guayama and Patillas. Other flags have been associated with Cofresí, however, no historical proof has been provided to support their use.

In his literary work El Pirata Cofresí, author Coll y Toste links him to the traditional Jolly Roger, describing his use of the "flag of death" or "the black flag used by pirates", without elaborating further. While other sources state that upon capture, Anne was flying "the red flag of Puerto Rico". Ensigns of this color were historically used by pirates to notify that no quarters would be granted, but its local use is different. This coloration became a symbol for several social and political struggles in Puerto Rico throughout the 19th century. The earliest recorded use of a red flag locally was in a military conspiracy within the Regimiento de Granada and led by Andrés Vizcarrondo, Buenaventura Valentín Quiñones and Juan Vizcarrondo, which intended to assassinate several key figures before declaring independence. The ensign would remain in use for the following decades and was unfurled by Manuel Rojas, General Commander of the Liberation Army during the Grito de Lares. Despite the widespread use, its association with Cofresí is most likely anachronistic and related to the several legends linking him to the Puerto Rican independence movement. This trend is repeated in A History of the United States Navy, where author Fletcher Pratt directly states that the pirates would sail under the "flag of the independent Puerto Rico Republic".

== See also ==
- Blackbeard in popular culture
- Antonio Correa Cotto
- Antonio García López
