= María Luisa Penne =

Puerto Rican painter

María Luisa Penne Rullan de Castillo
- Born: María Luisa Penne Rullan; 11 September 1913; Ponce, Puerto Rico
- Died: 6 October 2005 (aged 92); San Juan, Puerto Rico
- Education: Pratt Institute; University of Puerto Rico; Art Institute of Chicago; Columbia University
- Known for: Painter, Artist, and Educator
- Notable work: "Las Tres Luisas"
- Movement: Impressionism
- Awards: Institute of Puerto Rican Culture
- Patrons: Institute of Puerto Rican Culture; Museum of Art of Puerto Rico

María Luisa Penne Rullan de Castillo (11 September 1913 – 6 October 2005), born in Ponce, Puerto Rico, was a painter, artist, and educator who taught and influenced the work of well-known artists such as Noemí Ruiz, Jaime Carrero, Rafael Rivera Garcia, and printmaker Susanna Herrero among others.

== Early life ==
Doña María Luisa was born in Ponce, Puerto Rico on September 11, 1913.

== Education ==
Doña Maria Luisa attended the Pratt Institute in New York from 1932 to 1935 and became the first Puerto Rican to graduate from the prestigious art and design institute. She continued her studies, obtaining a Bachelor of Arts from the University of Puerto Rico in 1939 and a master's in Art from the Art Institute of Chicago in 1947. Her doctoral studies were conducted at Columbia University in New York.

After returning to Puerto Rico, Mrs. Castillo or "la teacher" - as she was known to her disciples - began to work for the empowerment of women in the art world, a field traditionally reserved for male members of society. She firmly believed in the importance of education as a means to achieve such empowerment. Therefore, she decided to get involved in the field of art education.

Penne Rullan designed and implemented the art curriculum for the Polytechnic Institute of San Germán (now known as the Inter-American University of Puerto Rico) and for the Colegio de Mayaguez also known as the University of Puerto Rico at Mayagüez. She was Head of the Department of Fine Arts at both institutions from 1940–1961 and 1961–1980, respectively.

== Personal life ==
Penne Rullan married Don Francisco Castillo Amy and had two children.

== Death ==
Penne died in San Juan, Puerto Rico in October 2005.

== Disciples ==
Among Penne's students was Rafael Rivera Garcia.

== Artist work and legacy ==
Some of her art work can be seen at the collection of the Institute of Puerto Rican Culture and at the Museum of Art of Puerto Rico.

== Important expositions in her honor ==
Name of Exposition	Sponsor	Date
Pinturas y Artes Applicadas de María Luisa P. de Castillo	University of Puerto Rico	1948
Cuadros para el hogar: Acuarelas de María Luisa P. de Castillo	Hotel Condado	1952
Exposición de acuarelas de María Luisa P. De Castillo	Colegio de Agricultura y Artes Mecánicas de Mayaguez	1961
Retrospectiva de María Luisa P. de Castillo	Departamento de Instrucción Pública	1972
Exposición Homenaje a María Luisa Castillo	Universidad Interamericana, Recinto de San Germán	1979
Exposición Homenaje a María Luisa Castillo	Ateneo Puertorriqueño	1985
Exposición Retrospectiva: María Luisa Penne de Castillo	Museo Casa Roig	1998
Las Tres Luisas	Universidad del Sagrado Corazon	2010

== Some collective expositions ==
Name of Exposition	Sponsor	Date
Primera Exposición Arte Independiente de Puerto Rico en la UPR	Universidad de Puerto Rico	1939
Liga de Artistas Americanos	Ateneo Puertorriqueño	1945
El paisaje de Puerto Rico	Instituto de Cultura Puertorriqueña	1961
Museo de Arte de Ponce	Museo de Arte de Ponce	1968
IV Bienal de San Juan del Grabado Latinoamericano		1979
Exposición Colectiva de Mujeres Artistas dedicada a la Prof. María Luisa Castillo	La Fortaleza	1979
Pintura y gráfica de los años 50	Instituto de Cultura Puertorriqueña	1985
Mujeres Artistas de Puerto Rico	Museo de Bellas Artes del Instituto de Cultura Puertorriqueña	1986
De Oller a los Cuarenta: La pintura en Puerto Rico 1898–1948	Museo de Historia, Antropología y Arte de la Universidad de Puerto Rico	1988
Mujeres Artistas: Protagonistas de los Ochenta	Museo de Arte Contemporáneo de Puerto Rico	1990
Los tesoros de la pintura puertorriqueña	Museo de Arte de Puerto Rico	2000

== See also ==
- List of Puerto Ricans
