= Roland Perusse =

American political scientist and author

Roland I. Perusse (May 18, 1921 – July 27, 2007) was the author of Haitian Democracy Restored: 1991–1995, a book about the coup-to-democracy period in Haiti, a political history.

He was a Professor of Political Science at the Interamerican University of Puerto Rico.
