= Benjamín López =

Filmmaker

- Born: East Chicago, Indiana, U.S.
- Education: Interamerican University of Puerto Rico (BFA)
- Occupation: Filmmaker
- Years active: 2005–present

Benjamín "Benji" López is a Puerto Rican filmmaker. He started his career directing the film Taínos in 2005. After that, he went on to direct the teen comedy Mi Verano con Amanda, which became very popular. It was followed by two sequels, both directed by López.

== Early years and education ==
Benjamín López was born in East Chicago, Indiana. After six years, his family moved to his father's hometown of Comerío, Puerto Rico. When he was 15 years old, he became the lead vocalist of the rock group Taba Co, releasing two albums. López went on to study at the Interamerican University of Puerto Rico where he completed a bachelor's degree in communications with a concentration in Media Production. While studying, he also gained practical experience as an audiovisual technician at the audiovisual rental company Stage Crew, Inc.

== Career ==
While studying in college, López directed a short film as part of a homework assignment. This project inspired him to launch the Puerto Rican-based production company Innova Entertainment, along with his business partner Eduardo Correa. It is through this company that he released his first film, Taínos, in 2005. López also became a prolific director for television commercials and music videos. In 2008, he released the teen comedy Mi Verano con Amanda. The film was very popular, earning various awards at the 2009 Rincón Film Festival including Best Local Movie. The film was followed by two sequels, also directed by López.

In 2013, López released his fourth full-feature film, ¿Quién Paga la Cuenta?. This film was set in Honduras and became one of the Top 10 highest-grossing films in Central America. The film still holds the record as the highest-grossing local film in Honduras. In 2020, López directed the TV movie Amores que Matan.

== Filmography ==
=== Feature films ===
Year	Title	Director	Writer	Cinematographer	Editor	Notes
2005	Taínos	Yes	Yes	Yes	Yes	
2008	Mi Verano con Amanda	Yes	Yes	Yes	Yes	Also producer
2011	Mi Verano con Amanda 2	Yes	Yes	No	Yes	Cameo role: Demetrio
2013	Mi Verano con Amanda 3	Yes	Yes	No	Yes	
2013	¿Quien paga la cuenta?	Yes	Yes	No	Yes	
2020	Amores Que Matan	Yes	No	No	Yes	
2024	Padres	Yes	No	No	No	

=== Short films ===
Year	Title	Director	Writer	Editor	Notes	
2009	The End	Yes	Yes	Yes	Yes	
2021	Delirium	Yes	No	Yes	Yes	Also co-producer
