= Hermann Kesten Prize =

German PEN Center award

- Awarded for: outstanding efforts in support of persecuted writers
- Sponsored by: Hessian Ministry of Higher Education, Research and the Arts
- Country: Germany
- Presented by: PEN Centre Germany
- Formerly called: Hermann Kesten Medal
- Reward: €20,000
- Website: kesten.de/pen-kesten-preis/

The Hermann Kesten Prize (German: Hermann-Kesten-Preis), formally the Hermann Kesten Medal (German: Hermann-Kesten-Medaille), is a German literary award presented annually for outstanding efforts in support of persecuted writers, on behalf of PEN Centre Germany according to the principles of the Charter of International PEN. In 1985, the PEN Center of the Federal Republic of Germany awarded the first Hermann Kesten Medal. It is named in honor of the German novelist and dramatist Hermann Kesten (1900–1996).

Until 1993, it was awarded every two years, since 1994 it has been given annually. As of 2025, the Hessian Ministry of Higher Education, Research and the Arts has endowed the award with a prize of €20,000.

The award is one of many PEN awards sponsored by International PEN affiliates in over 145 PEN centres around the world.

== Prize winners ==
- 1985 Bishop Helmut Frentz
- 1987 Kathleen von Simson
- 1989 Angelika Mechtel
- 1991 Christa Bremer
- 1993 Johannes Mario Simmel
- 1994 Carola Stern
- 1995 Günter Grass
- 1996 Victor Pfaff
- 1997 SAID
- 1998 Hermann Schulz
- 1999 Alexander Tkatshenko
- 2000 Nenad Popovic
- 2001 Harold Pinter
- 2002 Sumaya Farhat Naser and Gila Svirsky
- 2003 Anna Politkovskaya
- 2004 Bunt statt Braun
- 2005 Journaliste en danger
- 2006 Leonie Ossowski
- 2007 Hrant Dink
- 2008 Memorial
- 2009 Baltasar Garzón
- 2010 Liu Xiaobo
- 2011 Egyptian Publisher Mohammed Hashim
- 2012 Iryna Khalip (Iрына Халiп) Belarusian Journalist
- 2013 Index on Censorship
- 2014 Wolfgang Kaleck
- 2015 Gefangenes Wort e.V. and Madjid Mohit
- 2016 Translate for Justice
- 2017 Thomas B. Schumann
- 2018 Gioconda Belli
- 2019 Philippe Lançon
- 2020 Günther Wallraff
- 2021 Irena Brežná
- 2022 Meena Kandasamy
- 2023 Joan Manuel Serrat
- 2024 Fabio Stassi
- 2025 Marcia Sá Cavalcante Schuback

== See also ==
- German literature
- List of literary awards
- List of poetry awards
- List of years in literature
- List of years in poetry
