= Hermann Kesten =

German novelist and dramatist (1900–1996)

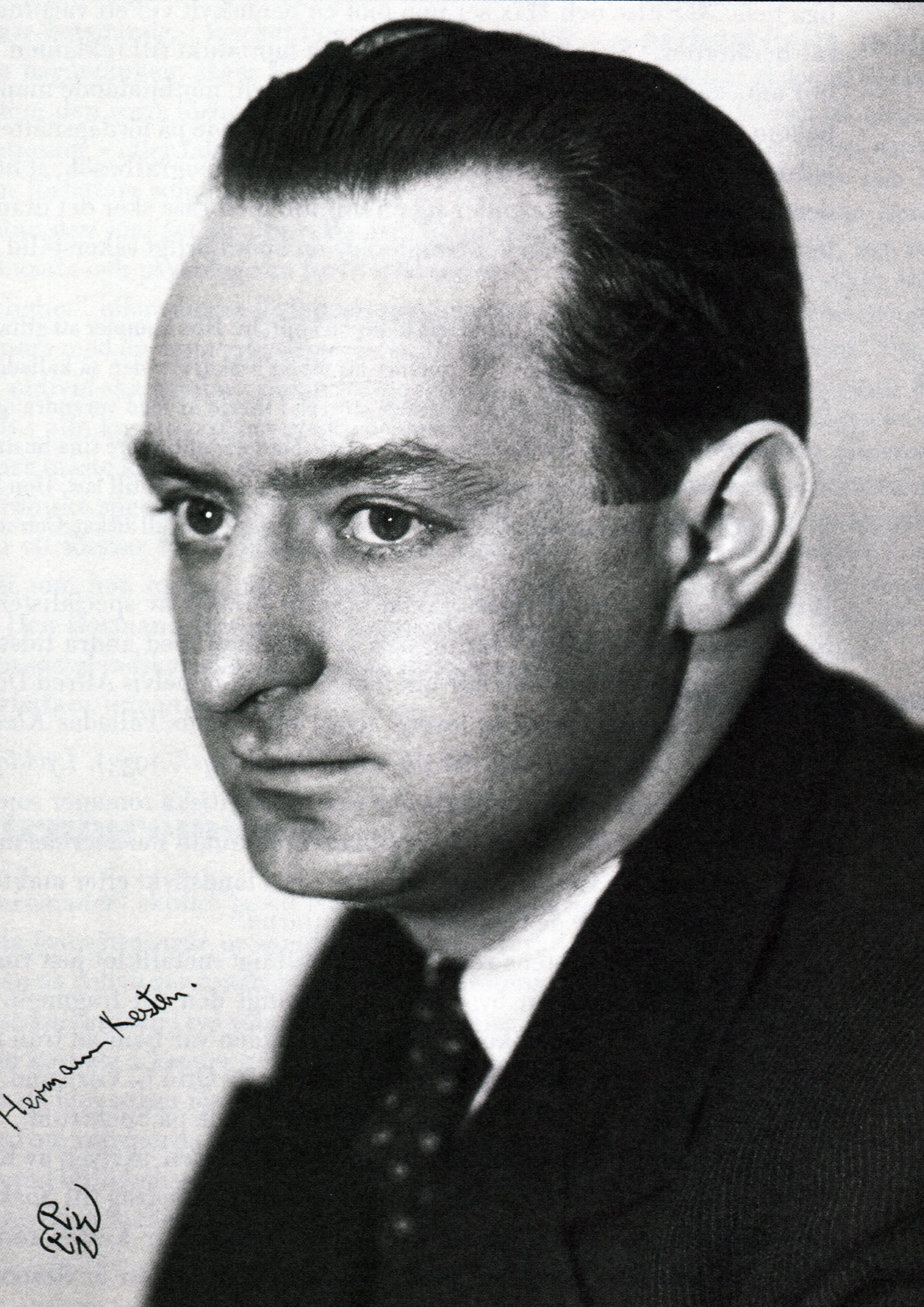
Kesten in c. 1935

Hermann Kesten (28 January 1900 – 3 May 1996) was a German novelist and dramatist. He was one of the principal literary figures of the New Objectivity movement in 1920s Germany.

The literary prize Hermann Kesten Medal has been given in his honor since 1985.

== Life ==
Kesten was born in Pidvolochysk (Galicia (Eastern Europe), Austro-Hungarian Empire) in 1900, a son of a Jewish merchant. The family moved to Nuremberg in 1904. In the early 1920s, while a student in Frankfurt, he was already writing plays and forging literary plans. Even at this early stage, he seems to have envisaged twin careers for himself, as a writer and as a publisher. Personal contacts – Kesten always relished the company of fellow writers and publishers – facilitated the move to Berlin to take up, in 1928, a post as an editor with the left-wing publisher Kiepenheuer. In the same year he published his first novel, Josef sucht die Freiheit ("Josef breaks free"). Two more novels quickly followed: Ein ausschweifender Mensch ("Running Riot", 1929) and Glückliche Menschen ("Happy Man", 1931).

1933, when Hitler came to power, he left Germany, and in Paris Kesten began working for the Amsterdam publisher Allert de Lange. Amsterdam became a centre of exile for German book-publishing in the 1930s and Kesten, who moved there and became part of it, took seriously the task of creating communities and preserving continuities, editing banned writers known and unknown, past and present, from Heinrich Heine to Bertholt Brecht. In 1940 Kesten emigrated to New York and later acquired American citizenship.

Throughout the Hitler years and beyond, Kesten continued to write prolifically. Indeed, the experience of those troubled times yielded fiction and nonfiction: novels tracing contrasting fates – Die Zwillinge von Nürnberg ("The Twins of Nuremberg", 1946) – or a Jew's recovery, against the odds, of his faith – Die fremden Götter ("Strange Gods", 1949) – or biographies of seekers after varieties of freedom – Copernicus (1948) and Casanova (1952).

Kesten's periodic moves (he lived in New York, Munich, Switzerland and for many years in Rome) did not sever his links with Germany. Distance and seniority gave him a special status as Germany, and German literature, in particular, emerged from the ruins. In the Group 47, by far the most influential grouping of writers and critics in the 1950s and early 1960s, he was regarded as "the Old Master", "the kindly, almost paternal mentor". He embodied, it seemed, a continuity reaching back into the far-distant 1920s. The recognition was there – Kesten received many prizes and acted as President of the West German PEN from 1972 to 1976.

== Works ==
=== Novels ===
- Josef sucht die Freiheit (1927)
- Ein ausschweifender Mensch (Das Leben eines Tölpels) (1929)
- Glückliche Menschen (1931)
- Der Scharlatan (1932)
- Der Gerechte (1934)
- Ferdinand und Isabella (1936)
- König Philipp II. (1938)
- Die Kinder von Gernika (1939)
- Die Zwillinge von Nürnberg (1947)
- Die fremden Götter (1949)
- Ein Sohn des Glücks (1955)
- Die Abenteuer eines Moralisten (1961)
- Die Zeit der Narren (1966)
- Ein Mann von sechzig Jahren (1972)

=== Novella collections ===
- Vergebliche Flucht und andere Novellen (1949)
- Die 30 Erzählungen von Hermann Kesten (1962)
- Dialog der Liebe (1981)
- Der Freund im Schrank (1983)

=== Biographies, Essays ===
- Copernicus und seine Welt (1948)
- Casanova (1952)
- Meine Freunde die Poeten (1953)
- Der Geist der Unruhe (1959)
- Dichter im Café (1959)
- Filialen des Parnaß (1961)
- Lauter Literaten (1963)
- Die Lust am Leben. Boccaccio, Aretino, Casanova (1968)
- Ein Optimist (1970)
- Hymne für Holland (1970)
- Revolutionäre mit Geduld (1973)

=== Stories ===
- Ich bin, der ich bin. Verse eines Zeitgenossen (1974).
- Ein Jahr in New York

== See also ==
- Exilliteratur
