= Luis Germán Cajiga =

Puerto Rican painter, poet and essayist

- Born: August 21, 1934; Quebradillas, Puerto Rico
- Died: June 28, 2025 (aged 90)
- Education: Antillean Adventist University (1969); Interamerican University of Puerto Rico (MA) (1975)
- Known for: Screen printing (serigraphy)

Luis Germán Cajiga was a Puerto Rican painter, poet and essayist known for his screen printing depicting Puerto Rico's natural landscape, its creole culture, and religious motifs. He was born in 1934, in the municipality of Quebradillas, Puerto Rico, and his studio was based in the Old San Juan.

== Early life ==
Cajiga was born on August 21, 1934 in barrio Cacao in Quebradillas, Puerto Rico. When he was a young man he moved to San Juan, where he studied graphic art. In 1955 he became a Seventh-day Adventist. While in the military he served in the Canal Zone in Panama, as a medic. In 1975 he got a master of arts degree in counseling and guidance at Interamerican University of Puerto Rico.

== Art work ==
=== Early work ===
He began his artistic education in the studio of the “División de Educación de la Comunidad en San Juan” (San Juan's Community Education Division). There, under the tutelage of Fran Cervoni, Cajiga furthered his interest for Old San Juan, a subject that permeated his art.

Cajiga dedicated a great deal of his time on serigraphic work (silk-screening). During the early years, he prepared and printed the works of Homar and Tufiño. These in return provided him with support and instruction. He continued to perfect the technique, which remained a significant part of his later work. His first two oil paintings may be found in the palace of Santa Catalina and at the Museo de Arte de Ponce. "Calle Mercado" one of the two aforementioned oils was acquired by Governor Luis A. Ferré. Among his exhibiting venues in Puerto Rico are: Ateneo Puertorriqueño, Instituto de Cultura Puertorriqueña (Institute of Puerto Rican Culture), Museo de la Universidad de Puerto Rico, Pontificia Universidad Católica de Puerto Rico, Universidad Interamericana, Museo de Arte de Ponce, various educational and cultural centers in the island, and commercial galleries. Many of his paintings, especially posters, were printed by the artist from Adjuntas, Puerto Rico Don Samuel Maldonado Plaza in the 1980s. The printing was done in the silkscreen shop of Don Gildo Rivera Santiago in Ponce, Puerto Rico.

Doris M. Vázquez, from the Yale-New Haven Teachers Institute considered him one of the most “outstanding artists of the fifties”. As a witness to that we find his artwork in the following collections:

- Museum of History, Anthropology, and Art, University of Puerto Rico, Río Piedras Campus, San Juan, Puerto Rico
- The Governor's Mansion: La Fortaleza, San Juan, Puerto Rico
- Instituto de Cultura Puertorriqueña, San Juan, Puerto Rico
- Museo de Arte de Ponce, Ponce, Puerto Rico
- Ateneo Puertorriqueño, San Juan, Puerto Rico
- Museum of Art of Puerto Rico, San Juan, Puerto Rico

=== Later work ===
He produced a poster for the United States Hispanic Heritage Month in 1997, and a mural in New York for the Heineken Mural Art Series in 2002.

== Poetry and other writings ==
Cajiga has published five poetry books as well as novels and short stories. Of notable mention is the book “Génesis: Décimas” a poetic transcription of the Book of Genesis published by the Institute of Puerto Rican Culture. He has also published various works of a religious nature as well as vegetarian recipe books.

Cajiga has been featured in various publications.

- Catalogues:
  - Babín, María Teresa. Programa de la Cultura Puertorriqueña.
  - "Fuego Divino", Libro de Poemas Ilustrados.
  - "Pintores Puertorriqueños Contemporáneos", San Juan, Puerto Rico.
  - "Portafolio", Instituto de Cultura Puertorriqueña, San Juan, Puerto Rico, 1958.
  - "Pintores Puertorriqueños", Portafolio Museo de Arte de Ponce, Ponce, Puerto Rico
- Magazines/Journals:
  - Boletín Academia de Artes y Ciencia, núm. 2, Tomo IV, 1969.
- Newspaper Articles:
  - Periódico El Mundo, Suplemento Dominical, (San Juan, PR), 11 de julio de 1971.
  - Periódico El Nuevo Día, (San Juan, PR), 28 de agosto de 1976.
  - Periódico El Mundo, (San Juan, PR), 27 de marzo de 1974.
  - Periódico El Mundo,(San Juan, PR), 26 de septiembre de 1976.
  - Periódico El Mundo, (San Juan, PR), 18 de enero de 1976.
  - Periódico La Hora, 27 de septiembre de 1973. The San Juan Star, (San Juan, PR), 19 de enero de 1975.
- Periódico El Mundo, (San Juan, PR), 4 de octubre de 1973.
- Periódico El Mundo, (San Juan, PR), 14 de enero de 1975.

== Awards, decorations, and recognitions ==
- 1957- Puerto Rico Fire Department Contest - 2nd Place
- 1965- IBEC, Caguas, Puerto Rico - 1st Place
- 1969- San Juan Town Hall Contest - 2nd Place
- 1972- Sterling House, Christmas Plate Design Contest
- High Council of Art- Agüeybana de Oro
- Libre Empresa Award
- Support from UNESCO-Puerto Rico has brought his artwork to Latin America and the European Union.

== Death ==
Luis Germán Cajiga died on June 28, 2025 at age 90.

== See also ==
- List of Puerto Ricans
