= Interamerican University of Puerto Rico, School of Optometry =

Inter American University of Puerto Rico School of Optometry
- Type: Private
- Established: 1981
- Parent institution: Inter American University of Puerto Rico
- Dean: Dra. Iris Cabello Rivas
- Students: 60 students per academic year(Four Year Terms)
- Location: 500 Dr. John W. Harris, Bayamon, 00957, Puerto Rico
- Website: www.optonet.inter.edu

Founded in 1981, the Inter American University of Puerto Rico, School of Optometry (IAUPR) offers a four-year Doctor of Optometry program and is located in Bayamón, Puerto Rico. In 1992, the School of Optometry became a separate autonomous academic unit within the Inter American University of Puerto Rico system. Inter American University of Puerto Rico- School of Optometry is an accredited institution and a member of the Middle States Commission on Higher Education (MSCHE). IAUPR- School of Optometry accreditation status is Accreditation Reaffirmed. The Commission’s most recent action on the institution’s accreditation status on 2013 was to reaffirm accreditation. MSCHE is an institutional accrediting agency recognized by the U.S. Secretary of Education and the Council for Higher Education Accreditation (CHEA). The Accreditation Council on Optometric Education (ACOE) has granted the Inter American University of Puerto Rico, School of Optometry the accreditation status of “Accredited with Conditions.” Accredited with Conditions, a probationary status, is a classification granted to an educational program with major deficiencies or weaknesses with reference to the Standards of accreditation that compromise the educational effectiveness of the program. The School is a member of the Association of Schools and Colleges of Optometry (ASCO). The School of Optometry is accredited by the American Optometric Association (AOA) for the maximum term of eight years. In 2025, ASCO reported that IAUPR students had a 16.67% first-time pass rate of the Part I ABS exam and a 75% overall pass rate for all Board exams. The average across all US optometry schools were 66.71% and 85.88%, respectively.
