= Mi Verano con Amanda =

- Directed by: Benjamín López
- Written by: Benjamín López
- Produced by: Benjamín López; Eduardo Correa
- Starring: Joel Contreras; Erik Rodríguez; Francis Rosas; Eugene Rodríguez; Tania Rodríguez
- Cinematography: Benjamín López
- Edited by: Benjamín López
- Production company: Innova Entertainment
- Release date: November 9, 2008
- Running time: 92 minutes
- Country: Puerto Rico
- Language: Spanish
- Budget: $300,000

Mi Verano con Amanda is a 2008 American coming-of-age teen comedy film directed, written, and produced by Benjamín López. The film's main ensemble cast includes Joel Contreras, Erik Rodríguez, Francis Rosas, and Eugene Rodríguez. The film became a local cult hit and spawned two sequels.

== Cast ==
- Joel Contreras as Gaby
- Erik Rodríguez as Chicho
- Francis Rosas as Fabio
- Eugene Rodríguez as RS
- Tania Rodríguez as Amanda

== Sequels ==
The film was followed by two sequels, Mi Verano con Amanda 2 (2011) and Mi Verano con Amanda 3 (2013). In December 2024, López announced that the film will be re-released in cinemas in January 2025.
