= Irena Brežná =

Swiss German-language writer of Slovak origin

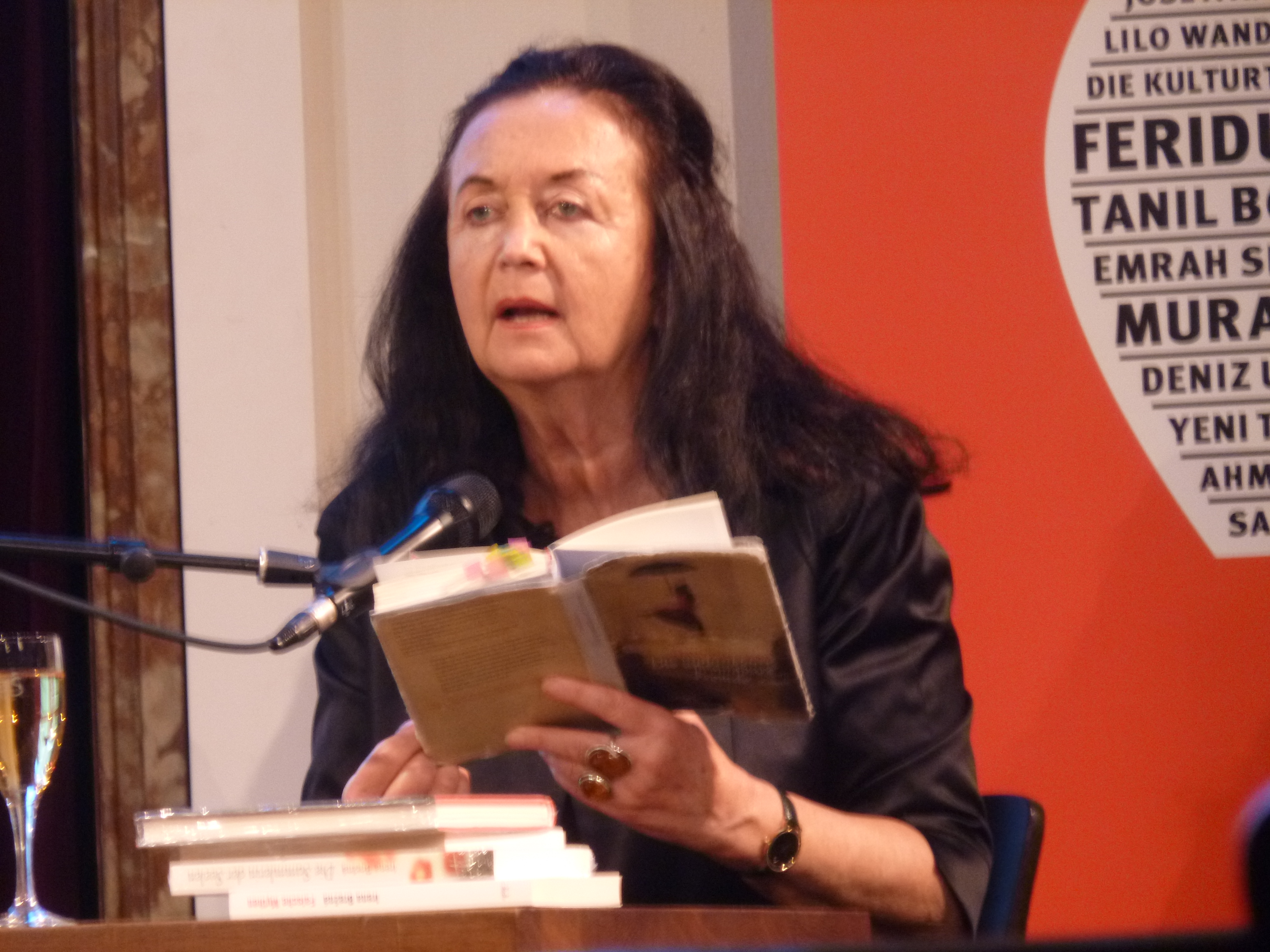
- Born: 26 February 1950 (age 76); Bratislava, Czechoslovak Republic
- Occupations: journalist, writer, activist

Irena Brežná (born 26 February 1950) is a Slovak-Swiss writer, journalist and human rights activist writing in German.

== Early life and education ==
Irena Brežná was born on 26 February 1950, in Bratislava. She grew up in Trenčín. Her parents were repressed by the communist Czechoslovak authorities, her mother spent a year in prison after an unsuccessful attempt to flee to Sweden, and her father – a lawyer – was forbidden from working in his professional field. Eventually, her family emigrated in 1968 to Switzerland. In 1975, Brežná began studying Psychology, Philosophy and Slavic studies at University of Basel. She worked as a psychologist and translated from Russian into German.

== Career ==
During Cold War, Brežná worked as a radio correspondent for the BBC Radio, Deutsche Welle and the Slovak branch of Radio Free Europe. She also actively participated in the works of Amnesty International, focusing on humanitarian and women's rights issues in Guinea and Chechnya. Since the 1980s, she has been a regular contributor to the German and Swiss press, including Die Zeit, Tages-Anzeiger, Neue Zürcher Zeitung, Basler Zeitung and Süddeutsche Zeitung. In the 1990s, she began regularly visiting Slovakia and contributing to a Slovak magazine, Aspekt.

Brežná writes in German. In her work, she often deals with the themes of alienation and injustice. She debuted in 1989 with an anti-racist children's book cowritten with Alpha Oumar Barry, titled Biro & Barbara. Her autobiographical work Die Beste aller Welten (2008) placed in Swiss bestseller lists.

Brežná is the recipient of a Swiss Literature Award for her 2012 novel Die undankbare Fremde. She was also awarded the Slovak Dominik Tatarka Award (2016) and Hermann Kesten Prize (2021). Her journalist work has brought her Emma-Journalistinnen-Preis, Theodor Wolff Prize and Zürcher Journalistenpreis. In 2022, she was awarded the Pribina Cross (2nd Class), a Slovak state order. In 2024, she was awarded the Order of Friendship by the Chechen government in exile for her support of Chechnya.

Brežná lives in Basel.

== Publications ==
- Brežná, Irena; Barry, Alpha Oumar (1989). Biro und Barbara. Gümligen: Zytglogge. ISBN 978-3-7296-0322-6. OCLC 611544616.
- —— (1991). Karibischer Ball : Erzählungen und Reportagen (in German). Zürich: EFeF-Verlag. ISBN 3-905493-15-2. OCLC 25657738.
- —— (2008). Die beste aller Welten : Roman (in German). Berlin: Ebersbach. ISBN 978-3-938740-72-9. OCLC 253609306.
  - Ірэна Брэжна. Найлепшы з усіх светаў : Раман / пераклад з нямецкай Лізаветы Касмач (in Belarusian). — Вільня: Логвінаў, 2015. — 126 с.
- —— (2010). Schuppenhaut ein Liebesroman (in German). Berlin: Ed. Ebersbach. ISBN 978-3-86915-025-3. OCLC 658235637.
- —— (2012). Die undankbare Fremde Roman (in German). Berlin: Galiani. ISBN 978-3-86971-052-5. OCLC 782970332.
- —— (2018). Wie ich auf die Welt kam in der Sprache zu Hause (in German). Zürich: Rotpunktverlag. ISBN 978-3-85869-795-0. OCLC 1048391953.
