= Noemí Ruiz =

Puerto Rican painter

- Born: 7 January 1931; Mayagüez, Puerto Rico
- Died: 10 May 2023 (aged 94)
- Education: Interamerican University of Puerto Rico (BA); New York University (MFA)
- Known for: Abstract painting

Noemí Ruiz (7 January 1931-10 May 2023) was a Puerto Rican painter, graphic artist and teacher. She was said to be a pioneer of abstraction in Puerto Rico. Her works can be found in many significant collections, and she represented Puerto Rico in many international exhibitions.

== Education ==
Noemí Ruiz studied at the Interamerican University of Puerto Rico in San Germán, where she earned a Bachelor of Arts Education and Arts Administration degree in 1953. She earned a Master of Fine Arts degree from New York University in 1956. At NYU, she studied painting, art education, supervision and administration. Ruiz also began experimentation with abstract art under George McNeil in the 1960s. At the Complutense University of Madrid in Spain, Ruiz completed took doctoral courses before studying lithography at the University of California, Berkeley.

== Career ==
Noemí Ruiz was acting director of the Fine Arts Department at the Inter-American University from 1959 to 1961, the same university where she earned her bachelor's degree. Ruiz was also a Founding Member of the Museum of Contemporary Art of Puerto Rico, as well as on its board of directors. Ruiz's other professions included teacher and professor, designer, department directors, lecturer, event and project organizer.

As professor and teacher, she worked in San German's public education system, at Inter-American University on the San German and Metropolitan campuses, and at Escuela de Artes Plasticas. She was a Department Director at the Inter-American University; Fine Arts twice, Artistic Education Program, and Art & Music.

Many times Ruiz helped coordinate and organize events and programs such as the Visiting Artists Program at Inter-American University (1976–77), Visit and Exhibition of Larry Rivers (1976–77), Art Appreciation Seminar (Inter-American University) (1968), Post Conference Tour of the National Education Association (1968), Seminars for Art Teachers - Department of Education (1962–63), and Second Seminar on Artistic Education (1964–65).

Ruiz died on 10 May 2023.

== Style ==
Noemí Ruiz's paintings are abstract in a non-representational style that interprets Latin American reality by using rhythmic color and alternating forms, trying to convey it all in a symbolic way. With sensitivity, discipline and mastery, Ruiz embodied her essential forms in the reality. Conceptually and symbolically, personal and natural elements can be seen in her pieces. Red and blue are common colors in her work, and at least one of the two seems to be present in every painting.

“Intention and result combine in the work of Noemí Ruiz to achieve a Latin American and Caribbean presence that proves to be outstanding in contemporary Puerto Rican art.”

– Jeannette Miller, Dominican writer and professor.

=== List of works ===
Telluric Presence

==== Museo de Arte de Puerto Rico ====
- Jazz (20th C)
- Caribbean land, texture and heat (21st C)
- Time Space-Sidereal plan I (21st C)
- Rhythm of blues and hidden labyrinth (21st C)
- Shooting star line (path), a Fall wish (21st C)
- Forms floating in space and breath of life (21st C)
- Study-composition of form and color (21st C)
- Red Space and sailboats on the time (20th C)
- Blue encounter with a Mask (20th or 21st C)
- Intruder coquí (20th C)
- Summer's Heat (20th C)

==== Coleccion Reyes-Veray ====
- Civilization (20th C)
- Good Luck Charm
- My Green Island (21st C)
- Tension (21st C)
- Veladuras del Viento (21st C)

==== Biaggi-Faure ====
- Espacio Rojo y Veleros en el Tiempo (21st C)
- Recuerdo Ancestral (21st C)
- Cuba: Paisaje de Playa con Destellos y Habana Blue (20th C)
- Vida: Composición de Formas y Sentires (21st C)
- Jardín del Pensamiento (21st C)

=== Collections ===
- Museo de Arte Contemporaneo de Puerto Rico (San Juan)
- Museo de Arte de Puerto Rico (San Juan)
- Cooperativa de Seguros Multiples de Puerto Rico (San Juan)
