= Angelika Mechtel =

German writer (1943–2000)

- Born: 26 August 1943; Dresden, East Germany
- Died: 8 February 2000 (aged 56); Cologne, Germany
- Resting place: buried at sea, bay of Boquerón in Puerto Rico
- Occupation: writer
- Known for: many genres
- Spouse: married c.1962, divorced 1985
- Partner: Gerd E. Hoffmann (1983–)
- Children: 2 daughters
- Parents: Walter Mechtel (father); Gisela Altendorf (mother)

Angelika Mechtel (26 August 1943 – 8 February 2000) was a German writer.

== Life ==
Angelika Mechtel was born in Dresden, the daughter of the journalist Walter Mechtel, who was a foreign correspondent for ARD in Beirut (Lebanon) and was shot dead in Aden, Yemen, on 18 November 1967. Her mother, the actress Gisela Altendorf from Oppenheim in Rheinhessen, died in 1994.

After her parents fled Kamenz in 1945, Angelika Mechtel grew up in West Germany and attended Waldorf and a convent school. She dropped out of school in 1962 before she could take her A-levels because she was pregnant. She married and gave birth to her daughter Anke in the same year. Her second daughter, Silke, was born in 1965. Angelika Mechtel divorced in 1985; she had lived with the writer Gerd E. Hoffmann since 1981.

Mechtel worked in many genres and wrote novels, poems, short stories, reportages, children's books, radio plays and scripts for television films. Her first volume of poetry, Gegen Eis und Flut, was published in 1963. Her first major success came in 1968 with the collection of stories Die feinen Totengräber. In Das gläserne Paradies (1973), she caricatures the bourgeois family. In 1975, she began writing for children. Her first children's book was called Hello, Vivi!

At the writers' congress in Mainz in March 1983, she was elected to the federal board of the Verband deutscher Schriftsteller (VS), today in ver.di, of which she was a member until April 1984. In 1989, she resigned from the VS because of what she saw as the association's half-hearted attitude in the Salman Rushdie case.

From 1983 to 1991, Mechtel was also Vice President of the West German PEN Centre; for the International PEN, she was the representative for the Writers-in-Prison-Committee.

Angelika Mechtel fell ill with breast cancer in 1987 and suffered a relapse in 1993, which forced her to give up her commitment to persecuted writers all over the world. She died in Cologne on 8 February 2000 at the age of 56.

After her death, at her request, her remains were cremated, and her ashes were buried at sea in the spring of 2000 where she had last lived – in the bay of Boquerón in Puerto Rico.
