= Rafael Rivera Garcia =

American painter

Rafael Rivera Garcia is an artist, muralist and professor of Art. Garcia was born in New York City, NY in 1930. As of 2012 he lives in Puerto Rico with his family. Garcia has a son who is also an artist and lives in Puerto Rico. He has painted murals in Puerto Rico, New York City, Miami, and Boston.

Garcia graduated from the High School of Music & Art in New York City. He had an art gallery in Rio Piedras, Puerto Rico in the 70’s. Garcia was a Professor of Art at University of Puerto Rico and was a visiting Professor of Art at Hunter College in New York City.

One of his murals of the Taino Indians has served as a neighborhood landmark in Jamaica Plain, Boston. The Boston Art Commission’s website describes the Taino mural as depicting the tribe’s wind goddess Huraca’n, from which the word for a tropical storm is derived. She is flanked by two gods Guatauba and Coatrisque, who represent in Taino mythology the respective powers of thunder and flooding water. According to a 2004 Boston Globe article reprinted on the Jamaica Plain Historical Society’s website, the mural grew out of Boston’s relationship with Dorado, Puerto Rico, and "affirmed JP and Hi-Lo as the heart of Boston’s Latino community.” Garcia work has been described as neo-figurative art. "Practitioners of neofiguration use recognizable images which are then molded and reconfigured—often focusing on form and color—according to the artist's own conceptual or interpretive constructs. While not embracing either realist or abstract conventions, the image evolves and is reinvented based on the painter's own vision or palette."

Another popular mural of Garcia's was painted in Taino Towers in East Harlem. ". . . two new murals celebrating the artistic tradition of the Taino Indians, the ancient people of Puerto Rico, began taking shape at the project. The murals, commissioned by Chembank, add a Caribbean explosion of color to the project's white concrete, black metal and neutral wood-grain surfaces.

Other murals by Garcia can be found in Miami, Florida, Guanico, Puerto Rico, San Juan, Puerto Rico, and Hunter College, New York.
