= Interamerican University of Puerto Rico =

Christian university in San Germán, Puerto Rico

Inter American University of Puerto Rico
- Universidad Interamericana de Puerto Rico
- Other name: Inter
- Type: Private university
- Established: 1912; 114 years ago
- Founder: Rev. John Will Harris
- Religious affiliation: Christian
- Academic affiliations: CONAHEC; Space-grant
- President: Rafael Ramírez
- Students: 40,000+ (all 11 campuses)
- Location: San Germán, Puerto Rico (main campus)
- Colors: Green and yellow
- Sporting affiliations: Liga Atlética Interuniversitaria, NCAA Division II
- Mascot: Tiger
- Website: www.inter.edu
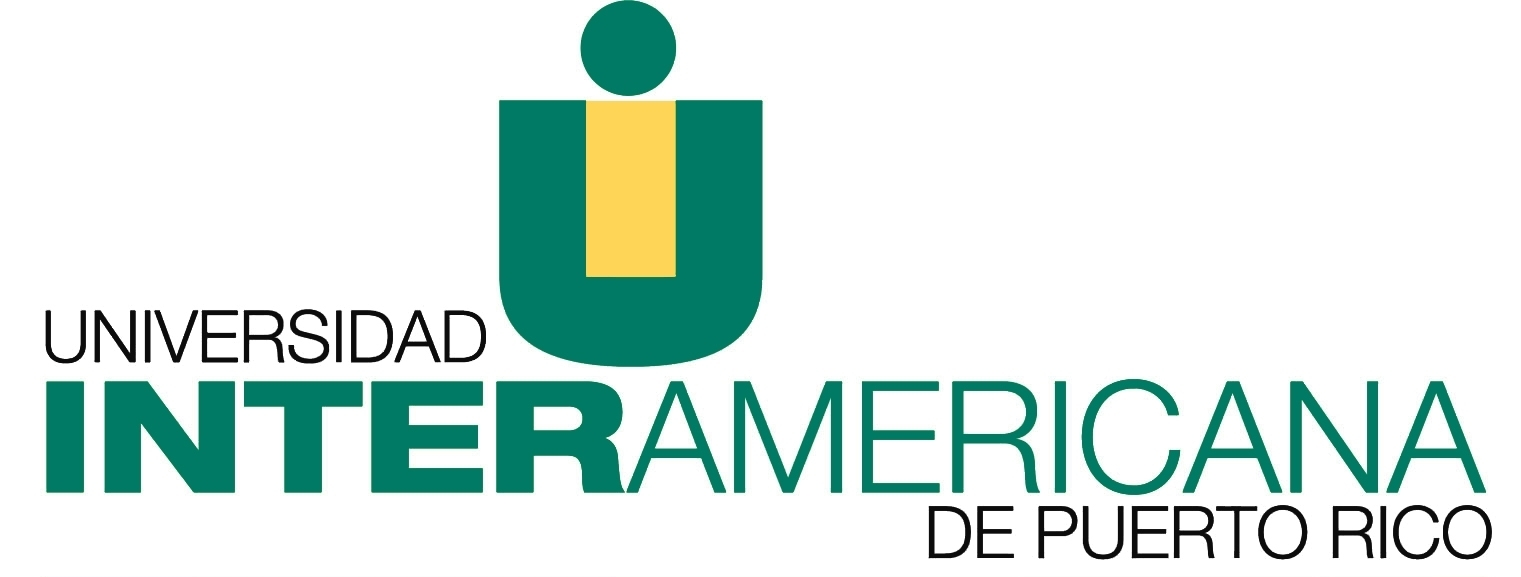

The Inter American University of Puerto Rico (Spanish: Universidad Interamericana de Puerto Rico; often abbreviated to UIPR or Inter) is a private Christian university with its main campus in San Germán, Puerto Rico. It also has campuses in Aguadilla, Arecibo, Barranquitas, Bayamón, Fajardo, Guayama, Ponce, and San Juan. The university also has three professional schools: School of Optometry, School of Law, and the School of Aeronautics. The Inter offers academic programs in 11 teaching units. It was founded in San Germán in 1912. The San Germán campus is also the home to the Inter American School, a private co-educational college-preparatory school.

== History ==
The Inter American University was founded as Polytechnic Institute of Puerto Rico in 1912 by Rev. John Will Harris, his brother Clarence Harris and Eusebio López Acosta. It was founded as an elementary and high school in the Lomas de Santa Marta sector of the town of San Germán in land now occupied by the university's San Germán Campus. In 1927, the first high school class graduation took place. In 1944, the institute was accredited by the Middle States Association of Colleges and Secondary Schools, thus becoming the first liberal arts college to receive such accreditation in Puerto Rico, as well as the first outside the continental United States. This accreditation has been maintained over the years.

== Governance ==
The governing body of the Inter American University of Puerto Rico is its self-perpetuating Board of Trustees. The faculty and administration of the Faculty of Law and School of Optometry determine their own programs and rules subject to approval by the president and trustees.

== Religious life ==
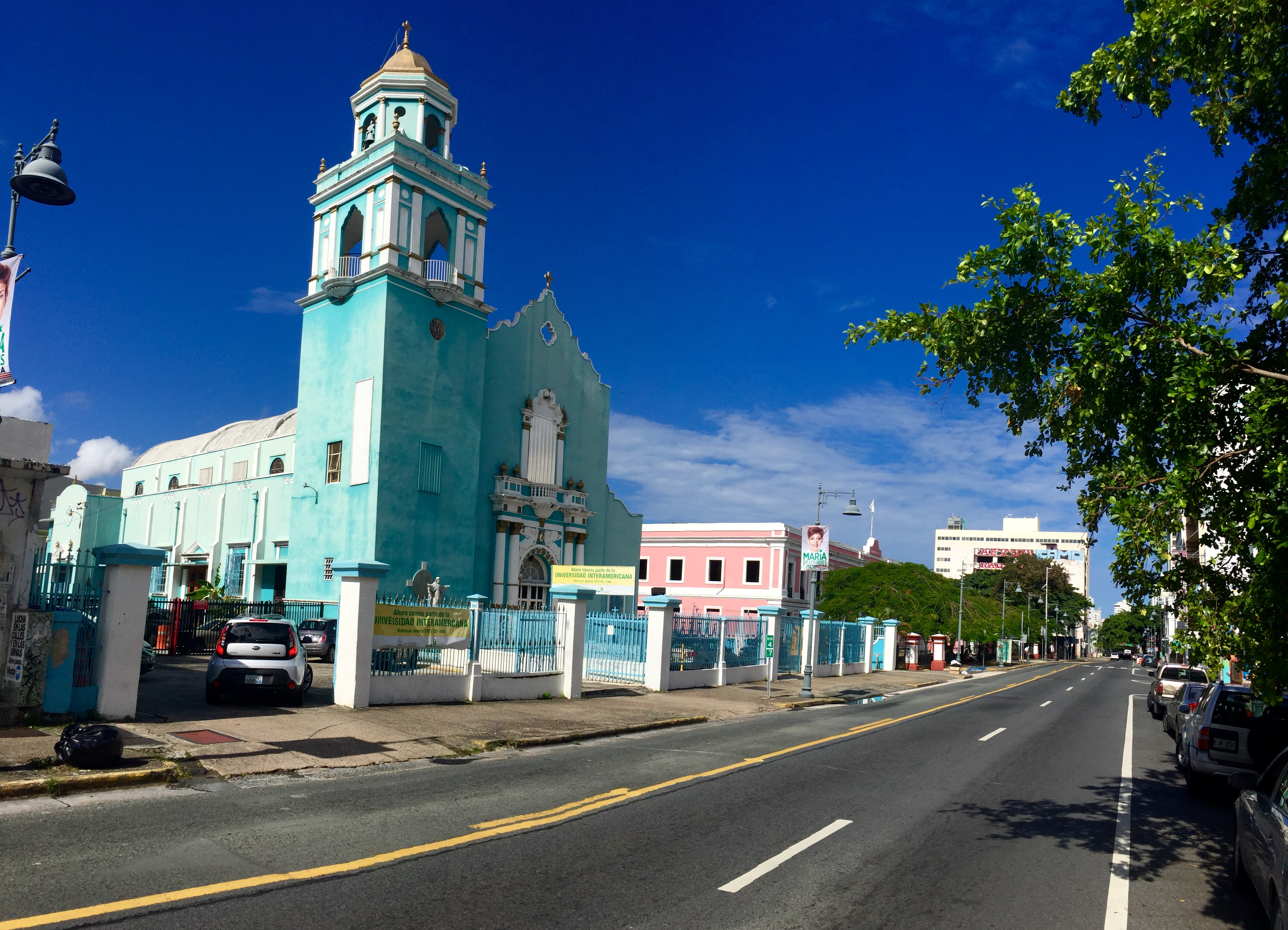
The school Academia Sagrado Corazón became part of the Universidad Interamericana in 2016; the name changed to Academia Interamericana Metro.

Although Interamerican University maintains a historic relationship with the Presbyterian Church (USA), it does not adhere to any one particular theology or ecclesiastical body.

== Accreditations ==
The eleven academic units of Inter American University of Puerto Rico are authorized by the Council on Education of Puerto Rico and accredited by the Middle States Commission on Higher Education to offer university studies of the undergraduate, graduate and professional levels, as the case may be. Likewise, the university is committed to the professional accreditation of its academic programs. For this reason, some academic units have programs accredited by organizations, such as:

- Accreditation Board for Engineering and Technology (ABET) Bayamón Campus
- Accreditation Council on Optometric Education (ACOE) School of Optometry
- American Bar Association (ABA) School of Law
- Council on Accreditation of Nurse Anesthesia Educational Program (CANAEP) Arecibo Campus
- Council on Social Work Education (CSWE) Arecibo and Fajardo campuses (B.A.) Metropolitan Campus (B.A., M.S.W.)
- International Association for Continuing Education and Training (IACET) Aguadilla, Arecibo, Barranquitas, Bayamón, Fajardo, Guayama, Metropolitano, Ponce and San Germán campuses, School of Law and School of Optometry
- International Assembly for Collegiate Business Education (IACBE) San Germán Campus (B.B.A., M.B.A, PhD)
- Joint Review Committee on Education in Radiologic Technology (JRCERT) San Germán Campus (A.A.S., B.S.)
- National Accrediting Agency for Clinical Laboratory Sciences (NAACLS) Metropolitano and San Germán campuses (BS, Professional Certificate)
- National League for Nursing Accrediting Commission (NLNAC) Aguadilla and Arecibo campuses (B.S.N.) Recinto Metropolitano (A.A.S., B.S.N.)
- Network of International Business Schools (NIBS) Metropolitan Campus (Division of Economic and Administrative Sciences)
- Teacher Education Accreditation Council (TEAC) Barranquitas, Fajardo, Metropolitan, Ponce and San Germán campuses (Teacher Education Program)

== Campuses ==
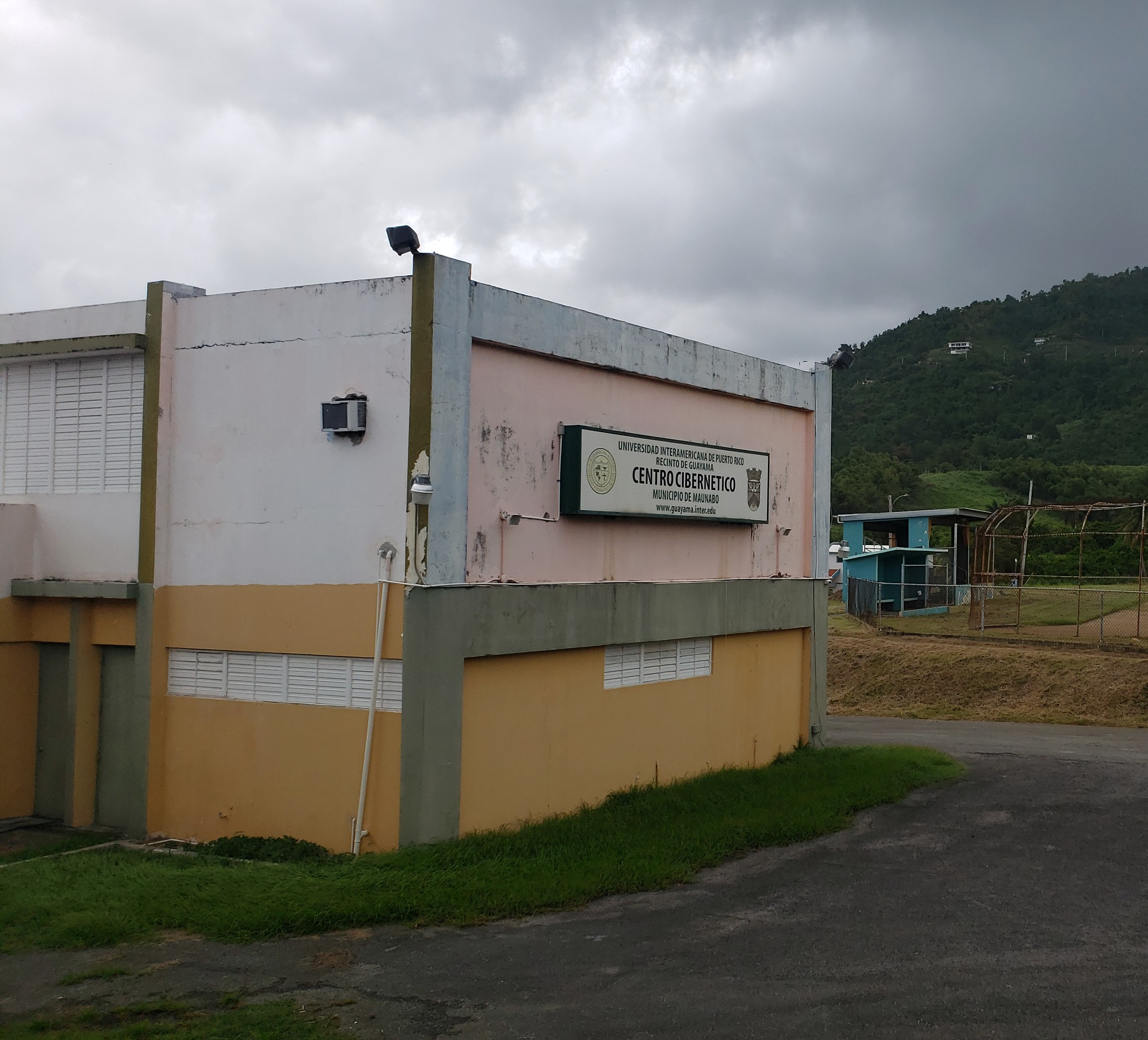
UIPR Cibernetic Center in Emajagua, Maunabo

- Aguadilla
- Arecibo
- Barranquitas
- Bayamón
- Fajardo
- Guayama
- Metropolitano
- Ponce
- San Germán

== Academics ==
Inter American University offers pre-university, undergraduate, graduate and professional academic programs for obtaining certificates and Associate, Bachelors, Masters and Doctoral degrees in subject matters normally offered by institutions of higher education of a nature, educational mission and goals similar to those of this university. The School of Law of Inter American University grants the Juris Doctor degree and the School of Optometry, the Doctor of Optometry degree. Graduate courses may be taught in Spanish.

== Notable alumni ==
- Luis Germán Cajiga - artist, painter
- Yiye Ávila – Pentecostal evangelist, writer and former bodybuilder
- Jaime Fonalledas – businessman and President of Empresas Fonalledas, which owns Plaza Las Américas
- Alejandro García Padilla – Former Governor of Puerto Rico
- Noemí Ruiz – artist
- Antonio Sanchez - Puerto Rican television and radio personality
- Tony Santiago - military historian
- Luguelín Santos – Dominican sprinter
- Joan Smalls – Supermodel
- Raymond Dalmau - basketball player
- Rubén Colón Tarrats – orchestra director
- Wanda Vazquez Garced - Former Governor of Puerto Rico

== See also ==
- Universidad Interamericana de Puerto Rico, Recinto de Ponce
- Centro Cibernético Orlando, Florida
