= Gubernatorial lines of succession in the United States =

The following is the planned order of succession for the governorships of the 50 U.S. states, Washington, D.C., and the five organized territories of the United States, according to the constitutions (and supplemental laws, if any) of each. Some states make a distinction whether the succeeding individual is acting as governor or becomes governor.

From 1980 to 1999, there were 13 successions of governorships. From 2000 to 2019 this number increased to 29. The only instance since at least 1980 in which the second in line reached a state governorship was on January 8, 2002, when New Jersey Attorney General John Farmer Jr. acted as governor for 90 minutes between Donald DiFrancesco and John O. Bennett's terms in that capacity as president of the Senate following governor Christine Todd Whitman's resignation. In 2019, Secretary of Justice of Puerto Rico Wanda Vázquez Garced became governor when both the governor and secretary of state resigned in Telegramgate.

From 1945 to 2016, 39 of those who succeeded to the governorship ran for and won election to a full term.

== States ==
=== Alabama ===
Established by Article V, Section 127 of the Constitution of Alabama.

#	Office	Current officeholder
	Governor of Alabama	Kay Ivey (R)
1	Lieutenant Governor	Will Ainsworth (R)
2	President pro tempore of the Senate	Garlan Gudger (R)
3	Speaker of the House of Representatives	Nathaniel Ledbetter (R)
4	Attorney General	Steve Marshall (R)
5	Auditor	Andrew Sorrell (R)
6	Secretary of State	Wes Allen (R)
7	Treasurer	Young Boozer (R)

=== Alaska ===
Established by Article III, Section 10 of the Constitution of Alaska.

#	Office	Current officeholder
	Governor of Alaska	Mike Dunleavy (R)
1	Lieutenant Governor	Nancy Dahlstrom (R)

=== Arizona ===
Established by Article V, Section 6 of the Constitution of Arizona.

#	Office	Current officeholder
	Governor of Arizona	Katie Hobbs (D)
1	Lieutenant Governor	Vacant
2	Secretary of State	Adrian Fontes (D)
3	Attorney General	Kris Mayes (D)
4	Treasurer	Kimberly Yee (R)
5	Superintendent of Public Instruction	Tom Horne (R)

=== Arkansas ===
Established by Article VI, Section 5 of the Constitution of Arkansas as amended.

#	Office	Current officeholder
	Governor of Arkansas	Sarah Huckabee Sanders (R)
1	Lieutenant Governor	Leslie Rutledge (R)
2	President pro tempore of the Senate	Bart Hester (R)
3	Speaker of the House of Representatives	Brian S. Evans (R)

=== California ===
Established by Article V, Section 10 of the Constitution of California and Title 2, Division 3, Part 2, Chapter 1, Articles 5.5 and 6 of the California Government Code.

#	Office	Current officeholder
	Governor of California	Gavin Newsom (D)
1	Lieutenant Governor	Eleni Kounalakis (D)
2	President pro tempore of the Senate	Monique Limón (D)
3	Speaker of the Assembly	Robert Rivas (D)
4	Secretary of State	Shirley Weber (D)
5	Attorney General	Rob Bonta (D)
6	Treasurer	Fiona Ma (D)
7	Controller	Malia Cohen (D)
8	Superintendent of Public Instruction	Tony Thurmond (NP/D) (Note: The office is officially nonpartisan, but Superintendent Thurmond identifies with the Democratic Party.)
9	Insurance Commissioner	Ricardo Lara (D)
10	Chair of the Board of Equalization	Sally Lieber (D)
11	List of 4–7 people named by the governor (subject to confirmation by the Senate) in the case of war or enemy-caused disaster.	

=== Colorado ===
Established by Article IV, Section 13(7) of the Constitution of Colorado.

#	Office	Current officeholder
	Governor of Colorado	Jared Polis (D)
1	Lieutenant Governor	Dianne Primavera (D)
2	President of the Senate (Note: Must be the same party as the outgoing governor. If the current officeholder is not a member of the same party, skip to the next on the list.)	James Coleman (D)
3	Speaker of the House of Representatives	Julie McCluskie (D)
4	Minority Leader of the Senate	Cleave Simpson (R)
5	Minority Leader of the House (Note: If the minority leader of the House is not a member of the same party as the outgoing governor, succession goes back to the president of the Senate.)	Jarvis Caldwell (R)

=== Connecticut ===
Established by Article IV, Sections 18–21 of the Constitution of Connecticut.

#	Office	Current officeholder
	Governor of Connecticut	Ned Lamont (D)
1	Lieutenant Governor	Susan Bysiewicz (D)
2	President pro tempore of the Senate	Martin Looney (D)

=== Delaware ===
Established by Article III, Section 20 of the Constitution of Delaware.

#	Office	Current officeholder
	Governor of Delaware	Matt Meyer (D)
1	Lieutenant Governor	Kyle Evans Gay (D)
2	Secretary of State	Charuni Patibanda-Sanchez (D)
3	Attorney General	Kathy Jennings (D)
4	President pro tempore of the Senate	David Sokola (D)
5	Speaker of the House of Representatives	Melissa Minor-Brown (D)

=== Florida ===
Established by Article IV, Section 3 of the Constitution of Florida and Florida Statute 14.055.

#	Office	Current officeholder
	Governor of Florida	Ron DeSantis (R)
1	Lieutenant Governor	Jay Collins (R)
2	Attorney General	James Uthmeier (R)
3	Chief Financial Officer	Blaise Ingoglia (R)
4	Commissioner of Agriculture	Wilton Simpson (R)

=== Georgia ===
Established by Article V, Section 1, Paragraph V of the Constitution of Georgia.

#	Office	Current officeholder
	Governor of Georgia	Brian Kemp (R)
1	Lieutenant Governor	Burt Jones (R)
2	Speaker of the House of Representatives	Jon Burns (R)

=== Hawaii ===
Established by Article V, Section 4 of the Constitution of Hawaii and Title 4 §26-2 of the Hawaii Revised Statutes.

#	Office	Current officeholder
	Governor of Hawaii	Josh Green (D)
1	Lieutenant Governor	Sylvia Luke (D)
2	President of the Senate	Ron Kouchi (D)
3	Speaker of the House of Representatives	Nadine Nakamura (D)
4	Attorney General	Anne E. Lopez (D)
5	Director of Finance	Seth Colby
6	Comptroller	Keith Regan
7	Director of Taxation	Gary Suganuma
8	Director of Human Resources Development	Brenna Hashimoto

=== Idaho ===
Established by Article IV, Sections 12–14 of the Constitution of Idaho.

#	Office	Current officeholder
	Governor of Idaho	Brad Little (R)
1	Lieutenant Governor	Scott Bedke (R)
2	President pro tempore of the Senate	Kelly Anthon (R)

=== Illinois ===
Established by Article V, Section 6 of the Constitution of Illinois and the Governor Succession Act

#	Office	Current officeholder
	Governor of Illinois	J. B. Pritzker (D)
1	Lieutenant Governor	Juliana Stratton (D)
2	Attorney General	Kwame Raoul (D)
3	Secretary of State	Alexi Giannoulias (D)
4	Comptroller	Susana Mendoza (D)
5	Treasurer	Mike Frerichs (D)
6	President of the Senate	Don Harmon (D)
7	Speaker of the House of Representatives	Chris Welch (D)

=== Indiana ===
Established by Article V, Section 10 of the Constitution of Indiana.

#	Office	Current officeholder
	Governor of Indiana	Mike Braun (R)
1	Lieutenant Governor	Micah Beckwith (R)
2	Speaker of the House of Representatives (Note: Only eligible to serve until a new governor is elected by the General Assembly.)	Todd Huston (R)
3	President pro tempore of the Senate	Rodric Bray (R)
4	Treasurer	Daniel Elliott (R)
5	Auditor	Elise Nieshalla (R)
6	Secretary of State	Diego Morales (R)

=== Iowa ===
Established by Article IV, Sections 17–19 of the Constitution of Iowa.

#	Office	Current officeholder
	Governor of Iowa	Kim Reynolds (R)
1	Lieutenant Governor	Chris Cournoyer (R)
2	President of the Senate	Amy Sinclair (R)
3	Speaker of the House of Representatives	Pat Grassley (R)

=== Kansas ===
Established by KSA Statute 75–125 and the Emergency Interim Executive and Judicial Succession Act of 1994.

#	Office	Current officeholder
	Governor of Kansas	Laura Kelly (D)
1	Lieutenant Governor	David Toland (D)
2	President of the Senate	Ty Masterson (R)
3	Speaker of the House of Representatives	Dan Hawkins (R)
Eligible to serve as emergency interim governor if 1–3 are vacant
4	Secretary of State	Scott Schwab (R)
5	Attorney General	Kris Kobach (R)

=== Kentucky ===
Established by Sections 84, 85 and 87 of the Kentucky Constitution.

#	Office	Current officeholder
	Governor of Kentucky	Andy Beshear (D)
1	Lieutenant Governor	Jacqueline Coleman (D)
2	President of the Senate	Robert Stivers (R)
3	Attorney General (Note: Only eligible to serve until a new president of the Senate is elected.)	Russell Coleman (R)
4	Auditor of Public Accounts	Allison Ball (R)

=== Louisiana ===
Established by Article IV, Section 14 of the Constitution of Louisiana.

#	Office	Current officeholder
	Governor of Louisiana	Jeff Landry (R)
1	Lieutenant Governor	Billy Nungesser (R)
2	Secretary of State	Nancy Landry (R)
3	Attorney General	Liz Murrill (R)
4	Treasurer	John Fleming (R)
5	President of the Senate	Cameron Henry (R)
6	Speaker of the House of Representatives	Phillip DeVillier (R)

=== Maine ===
Established by Article V, Part 1, Section 14 of the Constitution of Maine.

#	Office	Current officeholder
	Governor of Maine	Janet Mills (D)
1	President of the Senate	Mattie Daughtry (D)
2	Speaker of the House of Representatives	Ryan Fecteau (D)
3	Secretary of State	Shenna Bellows (D)

=== Maryland ===
Established by Article II, Section 6 of the Constitution of Maryland.

#	Office	Current officeholder
	Governor of Maryland	Wes Moore (D)
1	Lieutenant Governor	Aruna Miller (D)
2	President of the Senate	Bill Ferguson (D)

=== Massachusetts ===
Established by Article LV of the Constitution of Massachusetts.

#	Office	Current officeholder
	Governor of Massachusetts	Maura Healey (D)
1	Lieutenant Governor	Kim Driscoll (D)
2	Secretary of the Commonwealth	William F. Galvin (D)
3	Attorney General	Andrea Campbell (D)
4	Treasurer and Receiver-General	Deb Goldberg (D)
5	Auditor	Diana DiZoglio (D)

=== Michigan ===
Established by Article V, Section 26 of the Constitution of Michigan, Section 10.2 of the Revised Statutes of 1846 and the Emergency Interim Executive Succession Act (PA 202 of 1959, Section 31.4)

#	Office	Current officeholder
	Governor of Michigan	Gretchen Whitmer (D)
1	Lieutenant Governor	Garlin Gilchrist (D)
2	Secretary of State	Jocelyn Benson (D)
3	Attorney General	Dana Nessel (D)
4	President pro tempore of the Senate	Jeremy Moss (D)
5	Speaker of the House of Representatives	Matt Hall (R)
Eligible to serve as emergency interim governor if 1–5 are vacant
6	List of 5 people named by the governor	State Treasurer Rachael Eubanks
7	List of 5 people named by the governor	Fmr. Lieutenant Governor John Cherry (D)
8	List of 5 people named by the governor	Wayne County Exec. Warren Evans (D)
9	List of 5 people named by the governor	Businessman Gary Torgow
10	List of 5 people named by the governor	Fmr. U.S. Senator Debbie Stabenow (D)

=== Minnesota ===
Established by Article V, Section 5 of the Minnesota Constitution and Minnesota Statute 4.06.

#	Office	Current officeholder
	Governor of Minnesota	Tim Walz (DFL)
1	Lieutenant Governor	Peggy Flanagan (DFL)
2	President of the Senate	Bobby Joe Champion (DFL)
3	Speaker of the House of Representatives	Lisa Demuth (R)
4	Secretary of State	Steve Simon (DFL)
5	Auditor	Julie Blaha (DFL)
6	Attorney General	Keith Ellison (DFL)

=== Mississippi ===
Established by Article V, Section 131 of the Constitution of Mississippi.

#	Office	Current officeholder
	Governor of Mississippi	Tate Reeves (R)
1	Lieutenant Governor	Delbert Hosemann (R)
2	President pro tempore of the Senate	Dean Kirby (R)
3	Speaker of the House of Representatives	Jason White (R)

=== Missouri ===
Established by Article IV, Section 11(a) of the Constitution of Missouri.

#	Office	Current officeholder
	Governor of Missouri	Mike Kehoe (R)
1	Lieutenant Governor	David Wasinger (R)
2	President pro tempore of the Senate	Cindy O'Laughlin (R)
3	Speaker of the House of Representatives	Jonathan Patterson (R)
4	Secretary of State	Denny Hoskins (R)
5	Auditor	Scott Fitzpatrick (R)
6	Treasurer	Vivek Malek (R)
7	Attorney General	Catherine Hanaway (R)

=== Montana ===
Established by Article VI, Section 6 of the Constitution of Montana and Montana Code 2-16-511 to 2-16-513.

#	Office	Current officeholder
	Governor of Montana	Greg Gianforte (R)
1	Lieutenant Governor	Kristen Juras (R)
2	President of the Senate	Matt Regier (R)
3	Speaker of the House of Representatives	Brandon Ler (R)
4	Most senior member of the Montana Legislature (Note: "Senior" is defined as the member of the legislature who has served "for the longest continuous period of time", with age being the tiebreaker (in favor of the older/oldest person) if multiple people qualify.) (Note: Only eligible to serve until a new governor is elected by a joint session of the Legislature.)	State Sen. Llew Jones (R)

=== Nebraska ===
Established by Article IV, Section 16 of the Constitution of Nebraska and Nebraska Revised Statutes 84-120 and 84-121.

#	Office	Current officeholder
	Governor of Nebraska	Jim Pillen (R)
1	Lieutenant Governor	Joe Kelly (R)
2	Speaker of the Nebraska Legislature	John Arch (NP/R) (Note: The Nebraska Legislature is officially nonpartisan, but Speaker Arch identifies with the Republican Party.)
3	Chair of the Executive Board of the Legislative Council	Ben Hansen (NP/R) (Note: The Nebraska Legislature is officially nonpartisan, but this senator identifies with the Republican Party.)
4	Chair of the Committee on Committees	Christy Armendariz (NP/R)
5	Chair of the Judiciary Committee	Carolyn Bosn (NP/R)
6	Chair of the Government, Military and Veterans Affairs Committee	Rita Sanders (NP/R)
7	Chair of the Appropriations Committee	Robert Clements (NP/R)
8	Chair of the Revenue Committee	Brad von Gillern (NP/R)
9	Chair of the Education Committee	Dave Murman (NP/R)
10	Chair of the Banking, Commerce and Insurance Committee	Mike Jacobson (NP/R)
11	Chair of the Natural Resources Committee	Tom Brandt (NP/R)
12	Chair of the Agriculture Committee	Barry DeKay (NP/R)
13	Chair of the Health and Human Services Committee	Brian Hardin (NP/R)
14	Chair of the General Affairs Committee	Rick Holdcroft (NP/R)
15	Chair of the Urban Affairs Committee	Terrell McKinney (NP/D) (Note: The Nebraska Legislature is officially nonpartisan, but this senator identifies with the Democratic Party.)
16	Chair of the Business and Labor Committee	Kathleen Kauth (NP/R)
17	Chair of the Transportation and Telecommunications Committee	Mike Moser (NP/R)

=== Nevada ===
Established by Nevada Revised Statute 223.080.

#	Office	Current officeholder
	Governor of Nevada	Joe Lombardo (R)
1	Lieutenant Governor	Stavros Anthony (R)
2	President pro tempore of the Senate	Marilyn Dondero Loop (D)
3	Speaker of the Assembly	Steve Yeager (D)
4	Secretary of State	Cisco Aguilar (D)

=== New Hampshire ===
Established by Part 2, Article 49 of the Constitution of New Hampshire.

#	Office	Current officeholder
	Governor of New Hampshire	Kelly Ayotte (R)
1	President of the Senate	Sharon Carson (R)
2	Speaker of the House of Representatives	Sherman Packard (R)
3	Secretary of State	David Scanlan (R)
4	Treasurer	Monica Mezzapelle

=== New Jersey ===
Established by Article V, Section I, Paragraph 7 of the Constitution of New Jersey and New Jersey Revised Statute 52:14A-4.

#	Office	Current officeholder
	Governor of New Jersey	Mikie Sherrill (D)
1	Lieutenant Governor	Vacant
2	President of the Senate	Nicholas Scutari (D)
3	Speaker of the General Assembly	Craig Coughlin (D)
Eligible to serve as emergency interim governor if 1–3 are vacant
4	Attorney General	Jennifer Davenport
5	Commissioner of Transportation	Priya Jain (acting)

=== New Mexico ===
Established by Article V, Section 7 of the Constitution of New Mexico

#	Office	Current officeholder
	Governor of New Mexico	Michelle Lujan Grisham (D)
1	Lieutenant Governor	Howie Morales (D)
2	Secretary of State	Maggie Toulouse Oliver (D)
3	President pro tempore of the Senate	Mimi Stewart (D)
4	Speaker of the House of Representatives	Javier Martínez (D)

=== New York ===
Established by Article IV, Sections 5–6 of the New York Constitution and Article 1-A, Section 5 of the Defense Emergency Act of 1951.

#	Office	Current officeholder
	Governor of New York	Kathy Hochul (D)
1	Lieutenant Governor	Antonio Delgado (D)
2	Temporary President of the Senate	Andrea Stewart-Cousins (D)
3	Speaker of the Assembly	Carl Heastie (D)
Eligible to serve as emergency interim governor if 1–3 are vacant
4	Attorney General	Letitia James (D)
5	Comptroller	Thomas DiNapoli (D)
6	Commissioner of Transportation	Marie Therese Dominguez
7	Commissioner of Health	James V. McDonald
8	Commissioner of Economic Development	Hope Knight
9	Commissioner of Labor	Roberta Reardon
10	Chair of the Public Service Commission	Rory M. Christian
11	Secretary of State	Walter T. Mosley (D)

=== North Carolina ===
Established by Article III, Section 3, of the Constitution of North Carolina and G.S. Section 147.11.1.

#	Office	Current officeholder
	Governor of North Carolina	Josh Stein (D)
1	Lieutenant Governor	Rachel Hunt (D)
2	President pro tempore of the Senate	Phil Berger (R)
3	Speaker of the House of Representatives	Destin Hall (R)
4	Secretary of State	Elaine Marshall (D)
5	Auditor	Dave Boliek (R)
6	Treasurer	Brad Briner (R)
7	Superintendent of Public Instruction	Mo Green (D)
8	Attorney General	Jeff Jackson (D)
9	Commissioner of Agriculture	Steve Troxler (R)
10	Commissioner of Labor	Luke Farley (R)
11	Commissioner of Insurance	Mike Causey (R)

=== North Dakota ===
Established by Article V, Section 11 of the Constitution of North Dakota.

#	Office	Current officeholder
	Governor of North Dakota	Kelly Armstrong (R)
1	Lieutenant Governor	Michelle Strinden (R)
2	Secretary of State	Michael Howe (R)

=== Ohio ===
Established by Article III, Section 15 of the Constitution of Ohio and Title I, Chapter 161 of the Ohio Revised Code.

#	Office	Current officeholder
	Governor of Ohio	Mike DeWine (R)
1	Lieutenant Governor	Jim Tressel (R)
2	President of the Senate	Rob McColley (R)
3	Speaker of the House of Representatives	Matt Huffman (R)
4	Secretary of State	Frank LaRose (R)
5	Treasurer	Robert Sprague (R)
6	Auditor	Keith Faber (R)
7	Attorney General	Andy Wilson (R)

=== Oklahoma ===
As provided by Article VI, Section 15 of the Constitution of Oklahoma and the Oklahoma Emergency Interim Executive and Judicial Succession Act.

#	Office	Current officeholder
	Governor of Oklahoma	Kevin Stitt (R)
1	Lieutenant Governor of Oklahoma	Matt Pinnell (R)
2	President pro tempore of the Senate	Lonnie Paxton (R)
3	Speaker of the House of Representatives	Kyle Hilbert (R)
Eligible to serve as emergency interim governor if 1–3 are vacant
4	State Auditor and Inspector	Cindy Byrd (R)
5	Attorney General	Gentner Drummond (R)
6	State Treasurer	Todd Russ (R)
7	Superintendent of Public Instruction	Lindel Fields (R)
8	Labor Commissioner	Leslie Osborn (R)
9	Corporation Commissioner (by length of tenure)	Todd Hiett (R)
10	Corporation Commissioner (by length of tenure)	Kim David (R)
11	Corporation Commissioner (by length of tenure)	Brian Bingman (R)

=== Oregon ===
Established by Article V, Section 8a of the Constitution of Oregon

#	Office	Current officeholder
	Governor of Oregon	Tina Kotek (D)
1	Secretary of State	Tobias Read (D)
2	Treasurer	Elizabeth Steiner (D)
3	President of the Senate	Rob Wagner (D)
4	Speaker of the House of Representatives	Julie Fahey (D)

=== Pennsylvania ===
Established by Article IV, Sections 13–14 of the Pennsylvania Constitution

#	Office	Current officeholder
	Governor of Pennsylvania	Josh Shapiro (D)
1	Lieutenant Governor	Austin Davis (D)
2	President pro tempore of the Senate	Kim Ward (R)

=== Rhode Island ===
Established by Article IX, Sections 9–10 of the Constitution of Rhode Island

#	Office	Current officeholder
	Governor of Rhode Island	Dan McKee (D)
1	Lieutenant Governor	Sabina Matos (D)
2	Speaker of the House of Representatives	Joe Shekarchi (D)

=== South Carolina ===
Established by Article IV, Sections 6 and 7 of the South Carolina Constitution and South Carolina Code of Laws sections 1-3-120, 1-3-130 and 1-9-30.

#	Position	Current officeholder
	Governor of South Carolina	Henry McMaster (R)
1	Lieutenant Governor	Pamela Evette (R)
2	President of the South Carolina Senate	Thomas C. Alexander (R)
3	Speaker of the House of Representatives	Murrell Smith (R)
Eligible to serve as emergency interim governor if 1–3 are vacant
4	Secretary of State	Mark Hammond (R)
5	Treasurer	Curtis Loftis (R)
6	Attorney General	Alan Wilson (R)

=== South Dakota ===
Established by Article IV, Section 6 of the Constitution of South Dakota.

#	Office	Current officeholder
	Governor of South Dakota	Larry Rhoden (R)
1	Lieutenant Governor	Tony Venhuizen (R)

=== Tennessee ===
Established by Article III, Section 12 of the Constitution of Tennessee and Acts 1941, Chapter 99 §1.

#	Office	Current officeholder
	Governor of Tennessee	Bill Lee (R)
1	Lieutenant Governor and Speaker of the Senate	Randy McNally (R)
2	Speaker of the House of Representatives	Cameron Sexton (R)
3	Secretary of State	Tre Hargett (R)
4	Comptroller of the Treasury	Jason Mumpower (R)

=== Texas ===
Established by Article IV, Sections 3a and 16–18 of the Constitution of Texas and Chapter 401.023 of Title 4 the Texas Gov't Code.

#	Office	Current officeholder
	Governor of Texas	Greg Abbott (R)
1	Lieutenant Governor	Dan Patrick (R)
2	President pro tempore of the Senate	Charles Perry (R)
3	Speaker of the House of Representatives	Dustin Burrows (R)
4	Attorney General	Ken Paxton (R)
Chief Justices of the Texas Courts of Appeals, in numerical order
5	1st Court of Appeals (Houston)	Terry Adams (R)
6	2nd Court of Appeals (Fort Worth)	Bonnie Sudderth (R)
7	3rd Court of Appeals (Austin)	Darlene Byrne (D)
8	4th Court of Appeals (San Antonio)	Rebeca Martinez (D)
9	5th Court of Appeals (Dallas)	J.J. Koch (R)
10	6th Court of Appeals (Texarkana)	Scott E. Stevens (R)
11	7th Court of Appeals (Amarillo)	Brian Quinn (R)
12	8th Court of Appeals (El Paso)	Maria Salas-Mendoza (D)
13	9th Court of Appeals (Beaumont)	Scott Golemon (R)
14	10th Court of Appeals (Waco)	Matt Johnson (R)
15	11th Court of Appeals (Eastland)	John M. Bailey (R)
16	12th Court of Appeals (Tyler)	Jim Worthen (R)
17	13th Court of Appeals (Corpus Christi)	Jaime E. Tijerina (R)
18	14th Court of Appeals (Houston)	Tracy Christopher (R)
19	15th Court of Appeals (Austin)	Scott Brister (R)

=== Utah ===
Established by Article VII, Section 11 of the Constitution of Utah and the Emergency Interim Succession Act (C53-2a-803).

#	Office	Current officeholder
	Governor of Utah	Spencer Cox (R)
1	Lieutenant Governor	Deidre Henderson (R)
2	President of the Senate	Stuart Adams (R)
3	Speaker of the House of Representatives	Mike Schultz (R)
Eligible to serve as emergency interim governor if 1–3 are vacant
4	Attorney General	Derek Brown (R)
5	Treasurer	Marlo Oaks (R)
6	Auditor	Tina Cannon (R)

=== Vermont ===
Established by Chapter II, Section 20 of the Constitution of Vermont, 3 VSA §1 and 20 VSA §183.

#	Office	Current officeholder
	Governor of Vermont	Phil Scott (R)
1	Lieutenant Governor	John Rodgers (R)
2	Speaker of the House of Representatives	Jill Krowinski (D)
3	President pro tempore of the Senate	Philip Baruth (D/VPP)
4	Secretary of State	Sarah Copeland-Hanzas (D)
5	Treasurer	Mike Pieciak (D)

=== Virginia ===
Established by Article V, Section 16 of the Constitution of Virginia.

#	Office	Current officeholder
	Governor of Virginia	Abigail Spanberger (D)
1	Lieutenant Governor	Ghazala Hashmi (D)
2	Attorney General	Jay Jones (D)
3	Speaker of the House of Delegates	Don Scott (D)
4	House of Delegates convenes to fill the vacancy	

=== Washington ===
Established by Article III, Section 10 of the Constitution of Washington.

#	Office	Current officeholder
	Governor of Washington	Bob Ferguson (D)
1	Lieutenant Governor	Denny Heck (D)
2	Secretary of State	Steve Hobbs (D)
3	Treasurer	Mike Pellicciotti (D)
4	Auditor	Pat McCarthy (D)
5	Attorney General	Nick Brown (D)
6	Superintendent of Public Instruction	Chris Reykdal (NP/D) (Note: The office is officially nonpartisan, but Superintendent Reykdal identifies with the Democratic Party.)
7	Commissioner of Public Lands	Dave Upthegrove (D)

=== West Virginia ===
Established by §6A-1-4a of the West Virginia Code.

#	Office	Current officeholder
	Governor of West Virginia	Patrick Morrisey (R)
1	President of the Senate	Randy Smith (R)
2	Speaker of the House of Delegates	Roger Hanshaw (R)
3	Attorney General	JB McCuskey (R)
4	State Auditor	Mark Hunt (R)
5	Ex-Governors in inverse order of service (Note: Must still reside in the state to be eligible.)	Jim Justice (R)
6	Ex-Governors in inverse order of service	Earl Ray Tomblin (D)
7	Ex-Governors in inverse order of service	Joe Manchin (I)
8	Ex-Governors in inverse order of service	Bob Wise (D)
9	Ex-Governors in inverse order of service	Gaston Caperton (D)

=== Wisconsin ===
Established by Article V, Sections 7 and 8 of the Constitution of Wisconsin.

#	Office	Current officeholder
	Governor of Wisconsin	Tony Evers (D)
1	Lieutenant Governor	Sara Rodriguez (D)
2	Secretary of State	Sarah Godlewski (D)

=== Wyoming ===
Established by Article IV, Section 6 of the Wyoming Constitution.

#	Office	Current officeholder
	Governor of Wyoming	Mark Gordon (R)
1	Secretary of State	Chuck Gray (R)

== Federal district ==
=== Washington, D.C. ===
Established by Title IV, Section 421(c)(2) of the District of Columbia Home Rule Act.

#	Office	Current officeholder
	Mayor of Washington, D.C.	Muriel Bowser (D)
1	Chair of the D.C. Council	Phil Mendelson (D)

== Organized territories ==
=== American Samoa ===
Established by Article IV, Section 4 Constitution of American Samoa and Section 4.0106 of the American Samoa Codes Annotated.

#	Office	Current officeholder
	Governor of American Samoa	Pula Nikolao Pula (NP/R) (Note: Elections in American Samoa are officially nonpartisan, but Gov. Pula and Lt. Gov. Ae, and Speaker Ale identify with the Republican Party.)
1	Lieutenant Governor	Pulu Ae Ae (NP/R)
2	Speaker of the House of Representatives	Savali Talavou Ale (NP/R)

=== Guam ===
Established by Subchapter 1, Section 1422(b) of the Guam Organic Act of 1950.

#	Office	Current officeholder
	Governor of Guam	Lou Leon Guerrero (D)
1	Lieutenant Governor	Josh Tenorio (D)
2	Speaker of the Legislature	Frank Blas (R)

=== Northern Mariana Islands ===
Established by Article III, Section 7 of the Northern Mariana Islands Commonwealth Constitution.

#	Office	Current officeholder
	Governor of the Northern Mariana Islands	David Apatang (I)
1	Lieutenant Governor	Dennis Mendiola (R)
2	President of the Senate	Karl King-Nabors (R)

=== Puerto Rico ===
Established by Article IV, Section 8 of the Constitution of Puerto Rico and Law No. 7 of 2005

#	Office	Current officeholder
	Governor of Puerto Rico	Jenniffer González-Colón (PNP/R)
1	Secretary of State	Rosachely Rivera (PNP/D)
2	Secretary of Justice	Lourdes Gómez Torres
3	Secretary of Treasury	Ángel Pantoja Rodríguez
4	Secretary of Education	Eliezer Ramos Parés (PNP)
5	Secretary of Labor and Human Resources	María del Pilar Vélez Casanova
6	Secretary of Transportation and Public Works	Ángel Cruz Nolasco
7	Secretary of Economic Development and Commerce	Sebastián Negrón Reichard (PNP)
8	Secretary of Health	Víctor Ramos Otero

=== U.S. Virgin Islands ===
Established by Subsection IV §1595(b, e) of the Revised Organic Act of the Virgin Islands and the Executive Succession Act of 1972

#	Office	Current officeholder
	Governor of the United States Virgin Islands	Albert Bryan (D)
1	Lieutenant Governor	Tregenza Roach (D)
2	President of the Legislature	Milton E. Potter (D)
3	Vice President of the Legislature	Kenny Gittens (D)
4	Commissioner of Finance	Kevin McCurdy
5	Attorney General	Gordon Rhea
6	Director of the Office of Management and Budget	Julio Rhymer Sr.
7	Commissioner of Education	Dionne Wells-Hedrington
8	Commissioner of Public Works	Rueben Jennings (Acting)
9	Commissioner of Sports, Parks and Recreation	Vincent Roberts
10	Police Commissioner	Mario Brooks

== See also ==
- United States presidential line of succession
