= Puerto Rico Department of Economic Development and Commerce =

Government of Puerto Rico

- Departamento de Desarrollo Económico y Comercio de Puerto Rico
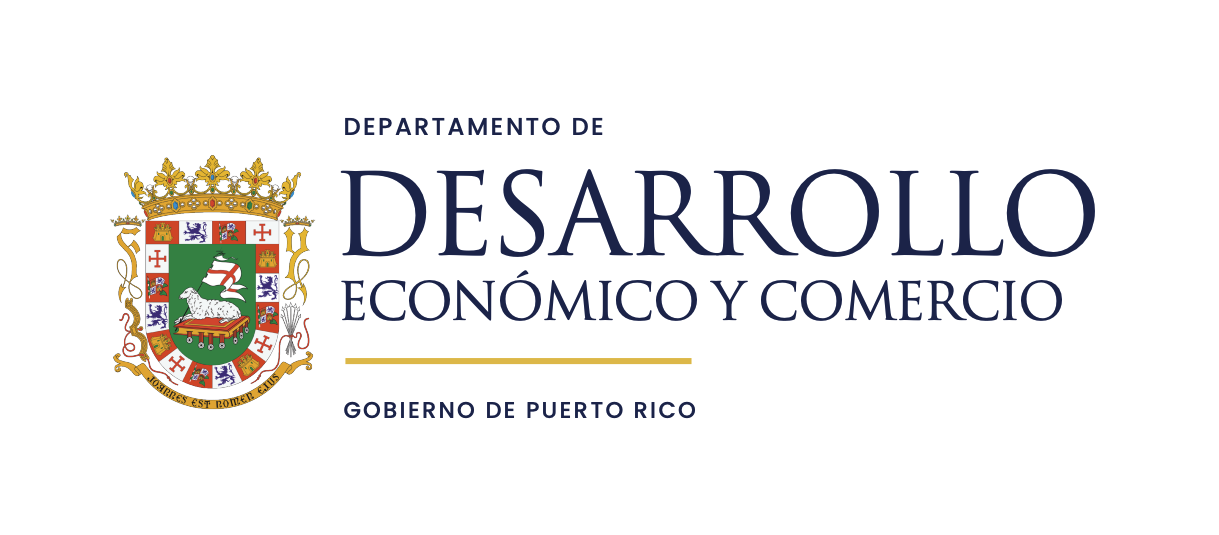

Department overview
- Formed: June 22, 1994; 32 years ago
- Jurisdiction: executive branch
- Headquarters: San Juan, Puerto Rico
- Department executive: Sebastián Negrón Reichard, Secretary, Secretary
- Child agencies: Puerto Rico Industrial Development Company; Puerto Rico Tourism Company; Puerto Rico Trade and Export Company
- Key document: Reorganization Plan No. 4
- Website: ddec.pr.gov

The Puerto Rico Department of Economic Development and Commerce (Spanish: Departamento de Desarrollo Económico y Comercio de Puerto Rico) is the executive department of the government of Puerto Rico responsible for the economic development in the U.S. Commonwealth of Puerto Rico and all its commerce related matters.

== History ==
The Department of Economic Development and Commerce was created by Pedro Rosselló in 1994 as an umbrella organization under which several economic development agencies would operate in a more coordinated fashion. Its first Secretary was Luis Fortuño, who appointed its former head, José Pérez Riera, after being elected Governor in 2008.

== Agencies ==
Among the agencies under its jurisdiction is the Puerto Rico Industrial Development Company (PRIDCO), the Puerto Rico Tourism Company, the Puerto Rico Trade and Export Company and several smaller agencies dealing with cooperatives and horse-racing.

== Secretary ==
- 1994–1999: Luis Fortuño
- 2005–2006: Jorge Silva Puras
- 2007–2009: Bartolomé Gamundi
- 2009–2013: José R. Pérez Riera
- 2013–2016: Alberto Bacó Bagué
- 2017–2020: Manuel A.J. Laboy
- 2020–2024: Manuel Cidre
- 2024–Present: Sebastián Negrón Reichard
