= Bartolomé Gamundi =

Puerto Rican politician (1939–2023)

Secretary of Economic Development and Commerce of Puerto Rico
- In office 2007–2009
- Governor: Anibal Acevedo Vilá

Personal details
- Born: Bartolomé Gamundi Cestero; May 18, 1939 La Vega, Dominican Republic
- Died: June 4, 2023 (aged 84) San Juan, Puerto Rico
- Party: New Progressive Party
- Education: McGill University; Interamerican University of Puerto Rico

Bartolomé Gamundi Cestero (May 18, 1939 – June 4, 2023) was a Dominican-born Puerto Rican businessman who was appointed by Governor Aníbal Acevedo Vilá as his last Secretary of the Puerto Rico Department of Economic Development and Commerce and president of the Commerce and Export Company of the government of Puerto Rico and confirmed unanimously by the Senate of Puerto Rico on June 30, 2008. Prior to obtaining a bachelor's degree in industrial engineering at McGill University in Montreal, Quebec, Canada, he studied at the University of Puerto Rico at Mayagüez. His master's degree is from the Interamerican University of Puerto Rico.

A general manager at Electro Biology Corp., and an executive at Arthur Andersen, Price Waterhouse, GE and Weston Instruments, Gamundi was a president of the Puerto Rico Manufacturers Association and of the Puerto Rico Chamber of Commerce. First as Chamber President and subsequently as Secretary of Economic Development, he was a member of the multi-sectorial committee that drafted Puerto Rico's Economic Development Law passed in June 2008. Gamundi served as a business book reviewer for the Sunday business section of El Nuevo Día, Puerto Rico's highest circulation daily newspaper.

Gamundi died of cancer on 4 June 2023, at the age of 84.

== Books ==
- Nuevas Direcciones para Líderes y Organizaciones del Futuro, July 2000
- La sociedad del conocimiento. 10 estrategias para transformar el mundo empresarial

== Awards and recognitions ==
- President, Puerto Rico Manufacturers Association
- President, Puerto Rico Chamber of Commerce (resigned in midterm upon appointment to the Governor's cabinet)
- Reach for Excellence Award, Electro-Biology Inc.
- Boy Scouts of America, Exemplary Citizen Award, 1987
- Industrial Engineer of the Year, Puerto Rico Institute of Industrial Engineers, 1994
- Top 10 Businessmen, Caribbean Business newspaper, 1996
- Distinguished Alumni, Interamerican University, 1996
- Presidential Medal for Civic Merit, awarded by the President of the Dominican Republic, 2002
- Héctor Jiménez Juarbe Award, Puerto Rico Manufacturers Association, 2004
