= New Hampshire Department of State =

Government agency in the U.S. state of New Hampshire

- State seal

Agency overview
- Formed: 1784 (242 years ago)
- Jurisdiction: New Hampshire
- Headquarters: New Hampshire State House Concord, New Hampshire
- Agency executive: David Scanlan, Secretary of State
- Website: sos.nh.gov

The New Hampshire Department of State is a government agency of the U.S. state of New Hampshire, based at the State House in Concord. The department is led by the Secretary of State, who is chartered to oversee all state elections and keep the official records of the state per the Constitution of New Hampshire as adopted in 1784. The Secretary is elected biannually by the New Hampshire General Court (state legislature).

== Organization ==
The department is organized into seven divisions:

- Administration Division
- Corporation Division
- Division of Archives and Records Management
- Division of Uniform Commercial Code
- Division of Elections
- Division of Securities Regulation
- Division of Vital Records Administration

Administratively attached to the department are:

- New Hampshire Board of Auctioneers
- New Hampshire–Canadian Trade Council
- New Hampshire Ballot Law Commission

The department also commissions notaries public within the state.
