= New Hampshire Division of Archives and Records Management =

Division within the New Hampshire State Department

- State seal

Agency overview
- Jurisdiction: New Hampshire
- Headquarters: State House, Concord, NH
- Agency executive: Ashley Miller, State Archivist
- Parent agency: N.H. Dept. of State
- Child agency: New Hampshire Division of Vital Records Administration
- Website: https://sos.nh.gov/

The New Hampshire Division of Archives and Records Management, or NHDARM, is a division within the New Hampshire Department of State, responsible for the proper management and archival of other agencies' records and for the preservation of historic documents viewable to the public. The division is led by the State Archivist, a position currently held by Ashley Miller.

== Activities ==
The Division of Archives and Records Management is responsible for numerous tasks related to records and their handling, including the following:

- Management and archival of other agencies' records
- Handling and preservation of historic public documents
- Auditing and verification of state election results, such as the 2022 New Hampshire Senate election.
