= El Mesón Sándwiches =

Fast-casual restaurant chain based in Puerto Rico

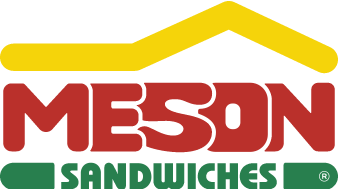
- Type: Private
- Industry: Fast Food
- Founded: 1972; 54 years ago Aguadilla, Puerto Rico
- Founder: Felipe Pérez Valentín
- Headquarters: Mayagüez, Puerto Rico
- Number of locations: 46 (2022)
- Areas served: Puerto Rico; Central Florida
- Key people: Felipe Pérez Grajales (President); Gil Pérez Grajales (Executive Vice President)
- Products: Sandwiches, Salads, Breakfast, Coffee
- Operating income: $80 million (2015)
- Owner: El Mesón de Felipe, Inc.
- Number of employees: 2,000+
- Website: ElMesonSandwiches.com (Spanish); MesonSandwiches.com (English)

El Mesón Sándwiches (marketed in Central Florida and sometimes in Puerto Rico as Meson Sandwiches) is a Puerto Rican fast-casual restaurant chain that primarily sells sandwiches, salads and breakfast items, which it serves all day long. Based in Mayagüez, Puerto Rico, it is Puerto Rico's largest restaurant chain. In 2012 it was named one of the world's top fast food chains by Travel & Leisure magazine. The chain is family-owned and operated and began franchising in 2018. It has 42 locations in Puerto Rico and four in Central Florida, located at The Florida Mall, in Kissimmee, at Lee Vista Promenade, and in Lake Nona. El Mesón Sándwiches units average $2 million in sales per year; system-wide sales in 2015 were just under $80 million.

== History ==
El Mesón Sándwiches was founded by Felipe Pérez Valentín in 1972, with its first restaurant in the beach town of Aguadilla, Puerto Rico. The original restaurant was known primarily for its home-style sandwiches in a family-style atmosphere. Many of its early customers were mainland American surfers who came early in the day asking for big, healthy breakfasts. Their requests prompted Pérez Valentín to create a sandwich stuffed with fresh vegetables and soy-based protein, dubbed "The Surfer". In 1987, El Mesón's second location opened and rapid growth followed shortly after Pérez Valentín's son returned from college.

== Products ==
El Mesón's sandwiches are mostly served on criollo bread, a sweet, French-style bread with a Caribbean flavor. Most are pressed on a hot grill and served with cabbage, tomatoes, mayonnaise and margarine. The Delicioso sandwich comes with turkey and bacon. The White House is grilled with roast beef, turkey and mushrooms. El Mesón also serves sandwiches on baked potatoes.

== Current leadership ==
Felipe Pérez Grajales is the current president of El Mesón Sándwiches, born in 1965, son of the chain's founder and the eldest of three brothers; one of which, Gil, is the executive vice president of the chain. From the early 1970s through his high school years, the eldest Pérez Grajales worked in the original El Mesón restaurant in Aguadilla. In 1983 he left Puerto Rico to attend Jacksonville University. Though he received several offers from companies in the mainland United States, he returned to Puerto Rico in 1987 to help expand the family business.

Pérez Grajales has been recognized as an outstanding businessman by Ernst & Young, the Puerto Rico Chamber of Commerce, the Sales & Marketing Executives (SME) Association, and the House of Representatives and Senate of Puerto Rico. He was president of the Organizing Committee for the 2010 Central American and Caribbean Games in Mayagüez and is president of the Mayagüez 2010 Foundation.
