= Benning Wentworth =

American merchant and colonial administrator (1696–1770)

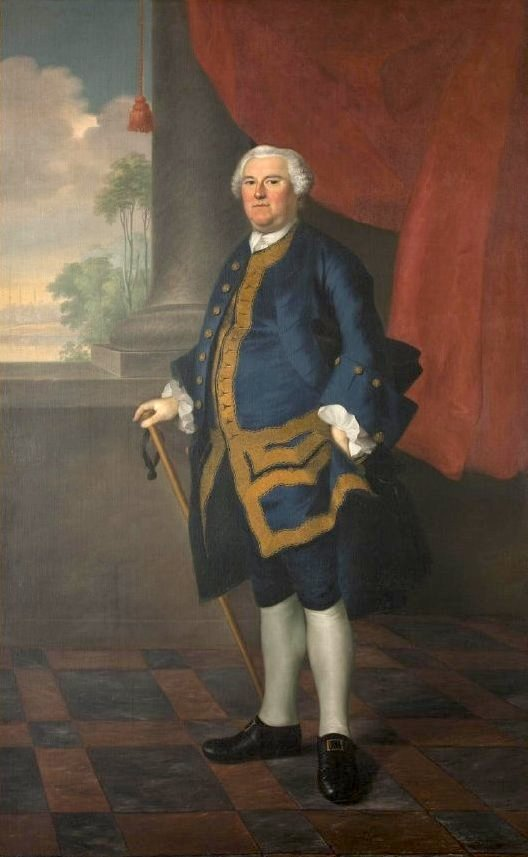
- Portrait by Joseph Blackburn, 1760

Governor of New Hampshire
- In office 1741–1766
- Monarchs: George II (1741–1760); George III (1760–1766)
- Preceded by: Jonathan Belcher
- Succeeded by: John Wentworth

Personal details
- Born: August 3, 1696 Portsmouth, New Hampshire
- Died: October 14, 1770 (aged 74) Portsmouth, New Hampshire
- Spouse(s): Abigail Ruck (m. 1719–1755); Martha Hilton (m. 1760–1770)
- Children: 3
- Parent(s): John Wentworth; Sarah Hunking Wentworth
- Profession: Merchant, colonial administrator
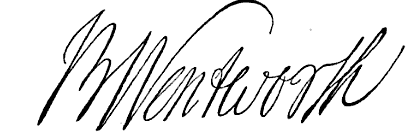
- Signature
- Nickname(s): Don Granada; Don Diego

Benning Wentworth (August 3, 1696 – October 14, 1770) was an American merchant, landowner and colonial administrator who served as the governor of New Hampshire from 1741 to 1766. He is best known for issuing a series of land grants between 1749 and 1766 in territory disputed with the Province of New York, for land which now makes up a significant portion of the state of Vermont. Born in Portsmouth, New Hampshire into a prominent local family, Wentworth was groomed by his father John to take over the family business before Wentworth's misbehavior at Harvard College led him to be sent by his father to Boston to undergo an apprenticeship at his uncle's counting house.

In Boston, Wentworth developed a profitable trading business before returning to Portsmouth in 1730 following the death of his father in order to assume control over the family estate. In New Hampshire, Wentworth soon became involved in the colony's political scene, being elected to the general assembly in 1732 and being appointed to sit on the governor's council in 1734. In 1733, a timber sale to Spain went unpaid, which soon brought Wentworth to the edge of bankruptcy. Efforts to resolve the debt led Wentworth to be appointed as the governor of New Hampshire in 1741, succeeding Jonathan Belcher.

During his tenure as governor, Wentworth focused primarily on issuing land grants, placating potential enemies, and appeasing New Hampshire's timber industry by turning a blind eye to the controversial white pine laws. In 1748, Wentworth sparked a crisis in the general assembly, but it was resolved in his favor in 1752. His land grants led New York to appeal to the Board of Trade, which came down against Wentworth in 1764. The controversy over the grants led Wentworth to step down in 1766, and he died four years later in Portsmouth. In Vermont, Bennington and Bennington County are named in his honor.

== Early life ==
Benning Wentworth was born on August 3, 1696, in Portsmouth, New Hampshire into a colonial family that "dominated both the economic and political life of New Hampshire from 1715 to the Revolutionary War". His father John was a ship's captain, businessman and colonial administrator who served as the lieutenant-governor of New Hampshire from 1717 until 1730. Wentworth's mother Sarah was the daughter of Captain Mark Hunking, a rich and influential resident of Portsmouth. John married Sarah in 1693, and spent two years at sea in Mark's footsteps before purchasing a tavern with his wife in 1695.

Wentworth was initially groomed by his father to take over the family business, though John changed his mind after sending his son to Harvard College in Massachusetts. While studying at Harvard, Wentworth exhibited numerous bouts of poor behavior, including setting a new record in the number of windows broken and fines paid. Following Wentworth's graduation in 1715, John arranged for him to undergo an apprenticeship at a Boston counting house owned by Wentworth's uncle Samuel. There, Wentworth established a business with the help of Hugh Hall, a half-brother and Wentworth's Barbados agent.

With heavy assistance from his father and Hall, Wentworth developed his business into a profitable trade company which traded in timber, wine and brandy with the West Indies and Spain for approximately a decade. Despite being based in Boston, he never bought real estate in the city and declined the town office of constable after being elected to the position. Following John's death on December 12, 1730, Wentworth returned to Portsmouth to assume control over his inheritance, which included 2,000 pounds, extensive real estate in New Hampshire, and the family's long-standing masts and timber trade.

== Political career ==
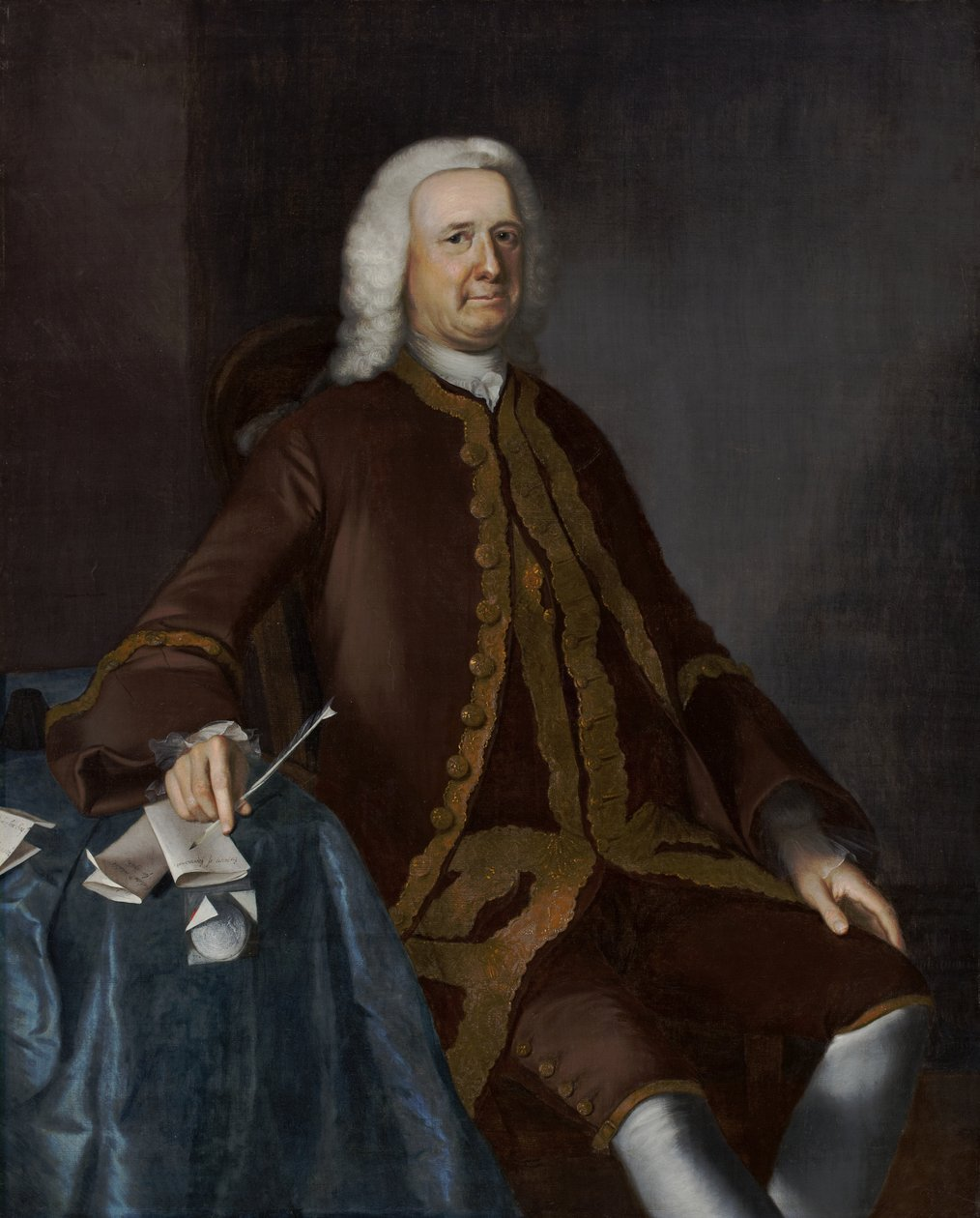
Theodore Atkinson, a major political ally of Wentworth

Following his return to New Hampshire, Wentworth quickly became involved in the colony's political sphere, which at the time was dominated by tensions between New Hampshire and Massachusetts, which exercised a large degree of control over the former. In 1730, governor of New Hampshire Jonathan Belcher was appointed as the governor of Massachusetts, and the relationship between the two turned sour over land grants issued by New Hampshire officials in territory disputed with Massachusetts. To oppose Belcher and his local ally Richard Waldron, Wentworth allied with Theodore Atkinson.

Wentworth was elected to the colony's general assembly in August 1732, and was appointed to the governor's council in 1734; both times, Wentworth was chosen thanks to the influence of David Dunbar, a political ally and opponent of Belcher who was then serving as the colony's lieutenant-governor. Wentworth's rise to power was opposed by Belcher, who described him as a "rascal" and "contemptible simpleton". Belcher was particularly angered by Wentworth's issuing of land grants in disputed territory. Eventually, the council was evenly divided between Wentworth's and Belcher's supporters, which "brought the colonial government to a halt".

In 1733, Wentworth arranged to sell a quantity of timber to Spain after his principal customer, the British Admiralty, began purchasing timber from Northern European sellers instead. However, soon after the deal was signed Anglo-Spanish relations soured following the establishment of the Province of Georgia by British colonizers in 1732 and Spanish authorities refused to pay the 11,000 pounds owed to Wentworth. Wentworth proceeded to borrow 11,000 pounds from London creditors to pay the same amount owed to Boston creditors who had financed the deal. Wentworth lodged a claim against the British government for the money he borrowed.

In 1738, Wentworth, on the verge of bankruptcy, went to London to negotiate a deal with his British contacts. While he was there, a commission was established to determine the disputed boundary between New Hampshire and Massachusetts, and eventually issued a ruling in support of New Hampshire. Meanwhile, one of Wentworth's London contacts formulated an agreement where in exchange for 300 pounds and dropping his claim Wentworth would be chosen as New Hampshire's governor. Wentworth's allies in New Hampshire quickly raised the sum, and on December 12, 1741 Wentworth officially succeeded Belcher as governor.

== Governorship and death ==
During his tenure as governor, Wentworth proved himself to be a "shrewd, compromising, and accommodating politician". He spent most of his tenure issuing land grants, placating potential rivals by appointing them as justices of the peace and officers in the militia, and appeasing New Hampshire's timber industry by turning a blind eye to the controversial Broad Arrow Policy, allowing merchants free access to the colony's forests in order to cut down white pine trees so long as they kept selling masts to his brother Mark, who sold them to the Admiralty. During the 1740s, Wentworth converted to Anglicanism and began supporting the Church of England's Society for the Propagation of the Gospel by issuing the society several land grants in New Hampshire to assist in its missionary efforts.

In 1748, Wentworth sparked a constitutional crisis by extending representation in the general assembly to newly established settlements which supported him politically. He also vetoed the assembly's decision to nominate Waldron as speaker of the house as Wentworth's political opponents had by now gained a majority in the assembly. The assembly objected, which led to a political impasse as both sides refused to concede. In 1749, Wentworth began issuing a series of land grants to expand the borders of New Hampshire. Between 1749 and 1766, he issued a total of 135 land grants in territory disputed with New York, which appealed to the Board of Trade. Wentworth's grants were cheaper than what New York authorities offered, making them more appealing to purchasers.

Both disputes Wentworth was involved in were eventually resolved by the Crown. Wentworth eventually received instructions from Crown officials in 1752 supporting his position regarding settlement representation and Waldron's nomination, which led to the standoff with the general assembly being resolved in his favor. On July 26, 1764, the Board of Trade issued a ruling on the disputed land grants in favor of New York. The land grant controversy led Wentworth to quietly step down as governor on July 30, 1766. His nephew John, who had prevented Wentworth from being dismissed in disgrace, succeeded him as governor in 1767. Wentworth retired to his mansion in Portsmouth where he died on October 14, 1770. He was buried in the cemetery of Queen's Chapel, Portsmouth.

== Personal life, family and legacy ==
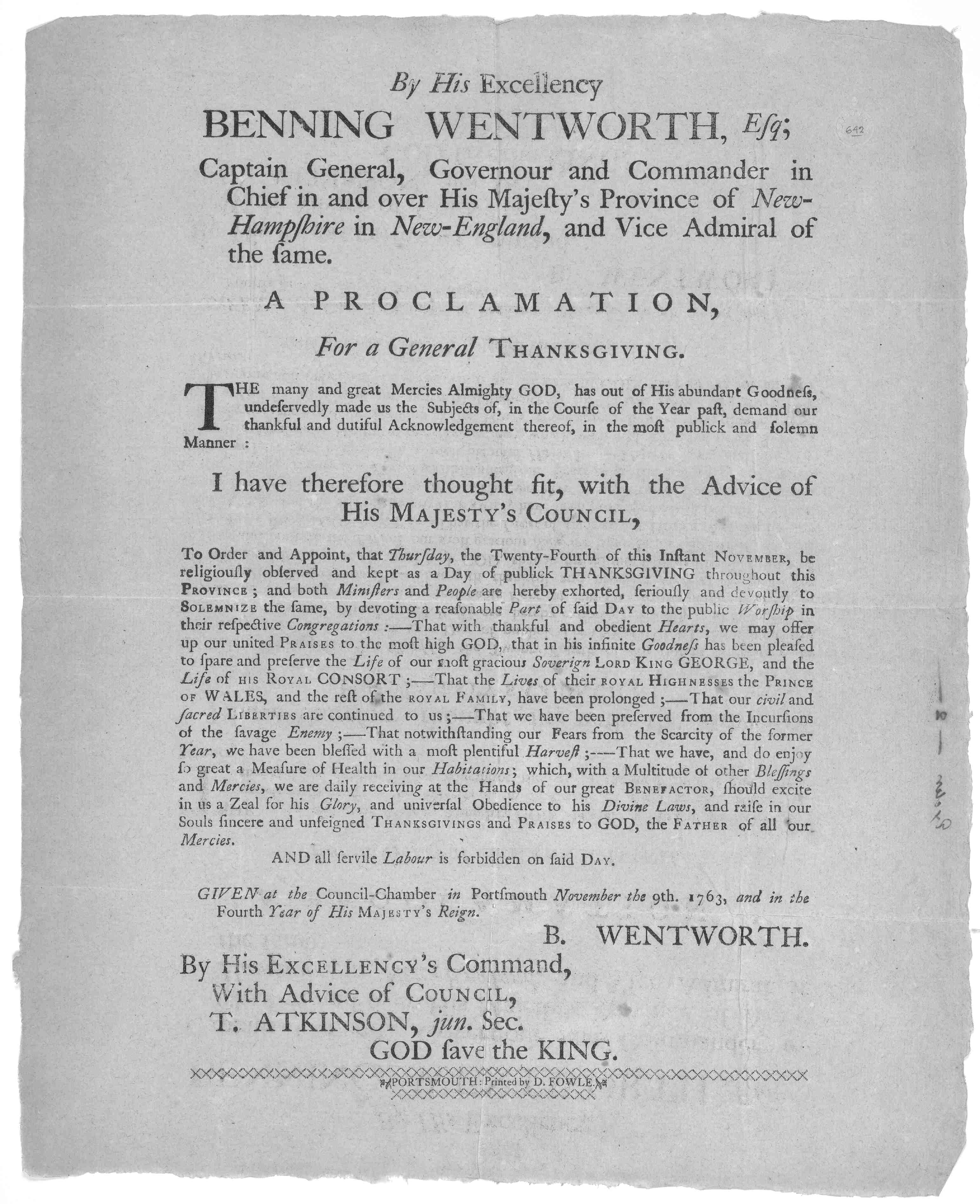
A Thanksgiving proclamation issued by Wentworth on November 9, 1763

Over the course of his career, Wentworth gained a "reputation of being haughty and arrogant yet shrewd and tenacious", and was pejoratively nicknamed "Don Granada" and "Don Diego" by his political opponents. He was described by the American historian David E. Van Deventer as being "able to [both] maintain a family dynasty and Portsmouth's control of the prosperous mast trade for a generation", becoming "perhaps even British America's first political machine." The American journalist Mark Bushnell argued Wentworth saw land and land grants "as the key to enriching himself and his family and to securing political power".

Wentworth had eight brothers and five sisters. Several followed Wentworth into political careers, while others married his associates, including Hannah, who married Atkinson in 1734. In 1719, Wentworth married Abigail Ruck, the daughter of a wealthy Boston merchant. The couple had three sons, all of whom died before Wentworth. After Abigail's death in 1755, Wentworth remarried in 1760 to his 23-year-old housekeeper, Martha Hilton. He had several children with her, though all were stillborn. Angered by his family shunning him for marrying Martha, Wentworth gave his entire estate to her in his will, leaving them with nothing.

Wentworth used his mercantile and political career to acquire a significant fortune, which included 10,000 guineas and several real estate properties. Harvard Magazine described him as "the very type of British colonial aristocrat" whose Portsmouth residence "was one of the colonies' most famous stately homes". In 1760, Joseph Blackburn painted a portrait of Wentworth, which as of 1995 is in the collections of the New Hampshire Historical Society. The many land grants Wentworth issued led to several places being named after him; in Vermont the town of Bennington along with Bennington County are both named in his honor.

Legal offices
Preceded by Jonathan Belcher	Governor of New Hampshire; 1741–1766	Succeeded by John Wentworth
