= Ezra Scollay Stearns =

American author and politician

Ezra S. Stearns
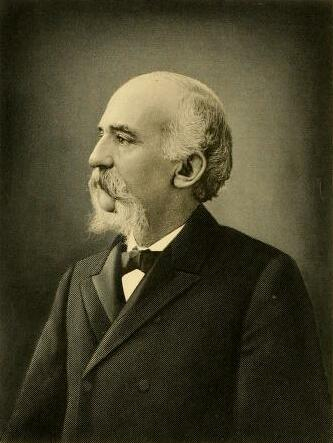
- Hon. Ezra S. Stearns

New Hampshire Secretary of State
- In office 1891–1899
- Governor: Hiram A. Tuttle; John Butler Smith; Charles A. Busiel; George A. Ramsdell
- Preceded by: Clarence B. Randlett
- Succeeded by: Edward N. Pearson

Personal details
- Born: September 1, 1838 Rindge, New Hampshire
- Died: March 9, 1915 (aged 76) Fitchburg, Massachusetts
- Party: Republican

Ezra Scollay Stearns (1838–1915) was an American historian, genealogist, and politician. He was Secretary of State for New Hampshire for twelve years, and for five years a member of the House of Representatives of that state.

== Early life ==
Ezra Scollay Stearns was born at Rindge, Cheshire County, New Hampshire, on September 1, 1838. He received a common-school education in his native town, and subsequently pursued abroad a thorough course of study. From 1858 to 1862 he was an instructor in the Chester Institute, Chester, New Jersey. Returning to Rindge, he devoted himself to study, was connected with prominent publishing firms in Boston, New York and Philadelphia, and in 1876 and 1877 was manager and editor-in-chief of the Chronicle at Fitchburg, Massachusetts.

== Politics ==
Stearns came of age at about the time the Republican Party was organized, and he soon became prominent as one of the stanchest members. In 1864 he was elected a member of the House of Representatives, and was re-elected in 1865–66–67 and in 1870, serving on the committees on judiciary, railroads, elections, and education, being chairman of the last two committees. He was one of the commissioners appointed by Governor Smyth in 1866 for ascertaining the war expenses of every city and town in New Hampshire, and at the June session submitted a report to the Governor. He was chairman of a special committee to take this report into consideration, and through his efforts the committee decided not to recommend the assumption of the town and city debt by the state, which decision the House sustained. Stearns was moderator of Rindge for twenty years and was elected Republican state senator in 1886. In the Senate of 1887 he was chairman of committee on revision of laws, and member of committee on judiciary elections and agriculture. He was re-elected to the Senate of 1889, and was chairman of committee on revision of laws, and member of committee on banks, manufactures, claims, and on towns and parishes.

In 1890 he was elected to the House of Representatives, and made chairman of committee on railroads. By joint convention of the two branches of the legislature he was elected Secretary of State for New Hampshire, and in March, 1891, he resigned his seat in the House and entered the office of Secretary of State. According to The National Cyclopaedia of American Biography, "Stearns took up its work with an accurate knowledge of its varied duties and familiarity with the state archives. His administration presents unqualified evidence of efficiency and popular approval."

== Writing ==
In 1876, Stearns published the History of Rindge and in 1887 the History of Ashburnham, both of which were well received throughout New England, and entitled him to a foremost rank among local historians. He was a resident member of the New Hampshire Historical Society, and an honorary member of several kindred societies in other states. For many years he manifested a lively interest in genealogy and in local history, contributed many excellent sketches and addresses to the literature of those subjects. According to the Cyclopaedia, "His literary style is graceful and terse, and as a speaker he is both clear and persuasive. His manner is courteous and unassuming, and he has the gift of making friends and keeping them." The degree of A.M. was conferred upon him by Dartmouth College in 1887.

== Death ==
Stearns died at his home in Fitchburg, Massachusetts, on March 9, 1915, at the age of seventy-six after a prolonged illness following a general breakdown. He was buried in his native town of Rindge, New Hampshire on March 11. As a mark of respect to his memory flags on Ingalls Library and other public buildings were at half mast. The following sonnet, which was written by Herbert Ingalls, a friend and former fellow-townsman of Stearns, was printed by the Fitchburg Daily Sentinel to mark the occasion:

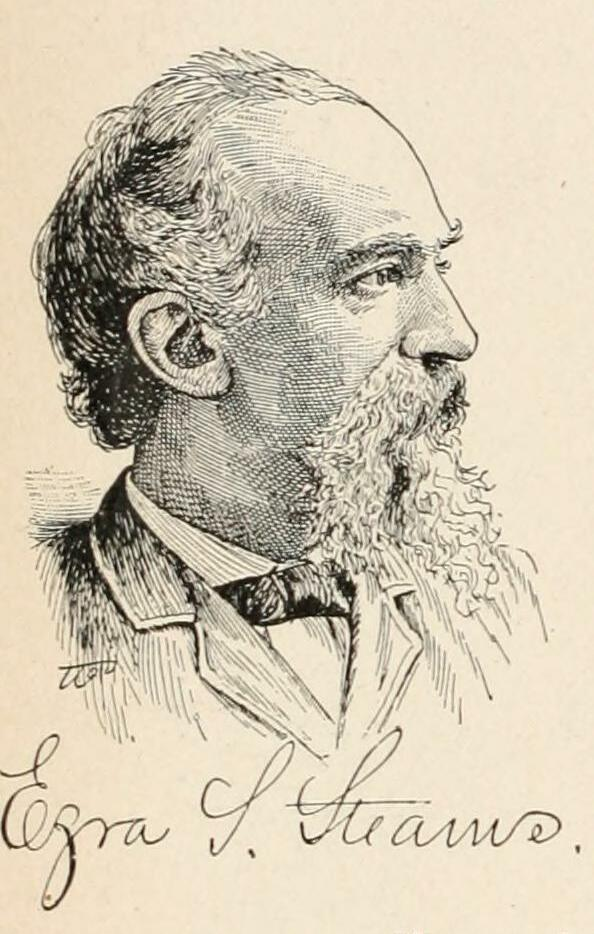
Likeness and signature (1901)

Sonnet—To a Historian
[To E. S. S.]

His work was done by conscientious toil
'Mongst faded manuscripts and time-worn books,
By faithful searches in forgotten nooks,
And earnestness which hindrance could not foil:
By frequent burning of the midnight oil,
By careful thought which seldom overlooks
A clue to truth, and never fully brooks
Defeated purpose. Children of the soil
Whose records thus are rescued from decay
Cannot but thank the patient, constant mind
That journeys down an ever-darkening way
To gather up its scattered lore, and bind
Remotest annals to a future day,
And moves clear-sighted where ourselves were blind.
