= Lawrence Park =

Lawrence Park may refer to:

== People ==
- Lawrence Park (art historian) (1873–1924), American art historian, architect, and genealogist

== Places ==
- Lawrence Park, Toronto, Canada
- Lawrence Park Township, Erie County, Pennsylvania, United States
- Lawrence Park Historic District, Bronxville, New York, United States
- Lawrence Gardens, Lahore, Pakistan

== Sports venues ==
- Lawrence Park (stadium), stadium in Lodi, California, United States
