= New Hampshire Administration Division =

Division within the New Hampshire State Department

- State seal

Division overview
- Jurisdiction: New Hampshire
- Headquarters: State House, Concord, NH
- Parent division: N.H. Dept. of State
- Website: sos.nh.gov/administration/administration/administration-division/

The New Hampshire Administration Division, or NHAD, is a division within the New Hampshire Department of State. The division includes the governor, their executive council, the Secretary of State and the state's justices of the peace. The division has a variety of responsibilities and administrative tasks, including presidency of the Board of Claims and the Board of Auctioneers, the application of apostilles and the issuing of special marriage licenses.

== Activities ==
The Administration Division has several responsibilities to its constituents, including the following:

- Authorizing an apostille or certification for a legal document, via notarization or a justice of the peace's signature.
- Appointing new notaries and justices of the peace to their respective positions.
- Authorizing and overseeing athlete agents in the state.
- Overseeing the state's board of auctioneers, including appointing new members, maintaining minutes from all past and future sessions dating from 2001 - 2030, and authorizing new rules.
- Managing key prepaid petroleum sales contracts for hundreds of vendors in the state.
- Overseeing the Board of Claims of the state of New Hampshire.
- Authorizing new Bonded Warehouses and Public Warehousemen and regulating current Bonded Warehouses.
- Appointing a Commissioner of Deeds for a period of five years.
- Authorizing new hawkers & peddlers, and regulating their sale of products.
- Licensing and regulating itinerant vendors in the state of New Hampshire.
- Authorizing special marriage licenses for ministers who reside out-of-state.
