= Winning New Hampshire =

- DVD Cover
- Release date: 2004
- Country: United States
- Language: English

Winning New Hampshire is a documentary film on the New Hampshire primary for President of the United States. Traditionally, the state of New Hampshire holds the first primary election of the presidential nominating process, and the New Hampshire primary is famous for its strong influence over the selection process of each party's presidential nominee. Produced during the beginning of the 2004 Presidential election, the film highlights the importance of this one small New England state in determining the eventual nominees, as exemplified by John Kerry's unexpected political comeback against then frontrunner Howard Dean in 2004. His victory in New Hampshire helped to secure his nomination and pitted him against incumbent President George W. Bush.

The film covers several topics, including the political youth movement, the media, third-party candidates and the voter's decision-making. Known for their fiercely independent political spirit, New Hampshire voters appear throughout the film and present themselves as political aficionados, attuned to every candidate's position on every issue.

Filmmakers Aram Fischer, Mark Lynch and Will Rabbe tracked candidates Wesley Clark, Joseph Lieberman, John Edwards, Howard Dean and John Kerry as they campaigned vigorously throughout the state. At times, the film captures comedic moments and at times pokes fun at the carnivalesque nature of the grassroots campaigns. One such moment arises when third-party protest candidate Vermin Supreme arrives wearing flipper shoulder pads and a boot on his head. More discreet tongue-in-cheek humor is evident in the score and the dramatization of otherwise low-key and intimate gatherings.

Other appearances include Bill Gardner (the New Hampshire Secretary of State), U.S. Senator Ted Kennedy, Congressman Ed Markey, Vanessa Kerry and Martin Sheen.
