= Frankie Chévere =

Puerto Rican politician and lawyer

Executive Director Puerto Rico Trade and Export Company
- Incumbent
- Assumed office January 2, 2013
- Governor: Alejandro García Padilla
- Preceded by: José Pérez Riera

Personal details
- Born: Francisco Chévere Mouriño Ponce, Puerto Rico
- Party: Popular Democratic Party
- Education: Georgetown University (BA); University of Pennsylvania Law School (JD)
- Occupation: attorney at-law
- Nickname: Frankie

Francisco "Frankie" Chévere Mouriño was an attorney and the executive director of the Puerto Rico Trade and Export Company.

== Biography ==
In his youth, Chévere studied saxophone and clarinet at the Juan Morel Campos School in Ponce and played in the school’s jazz band.

Chévere has a Bachelor in Arts from Georgetown University, a juris doctor degree from the University of Pennsylvania Law School and participated in a one-year study abroad GY-Program taking Masters-level courses in economics and political science at the University of Sussex.

At Georgetown, he performed in the university orchestra and sang in the choir. As an adult, he became a coach and manager of youth league baseball teams.

== Career ==
Before his appointment at the Trade and Export Company, Chévere was a renowned lawyer in labor law. For more than 25 years, Chévere worked at the law firm McConnell Valdés, where he became a partner.

In 2013, Chévere was appointed head of the Puerto Rico Trade and Export Company (Compañía de Comercio y Exportación de Puerto Rico, CCE). During his tenure, he implemented measures to promote small and medium-sized enterprises (SMEs) and strengthen their role in the Puerto Rican economy.

Under his leadership, the agency oversaw the administration of the Empleos Ahora Act, which aimed to stimulate job creation and investment, and supported the passage of Act 120, providing permanent incentives for SME employment and retention.

Chévere also promoted initiatives to encourage entrepreneurship, export growth, and international visibility, including the participation of Puerto Rican companies in the Epcot Food & Wine Festival in Florida and trade missions across the Caribbean and the Americas. He emphasised reducing bureaucratic barriers and positioning SMEs as a key driver of economic diversification and innovation in Puerto Rico.

He was also an active participant in the Popular Democratic Party where he was a former candidate for mayor of Guaynabo and the biggest fundraiser for the gubernatorial campaign of Alejandro García Padilla, the governor of Puerto Rico. He is the Executive Director at Catholic Charities of the Diocese of Palm Beach, Inc.

== Family ==
Two of his three sons, Francisco (Kiko) and Hiram (Tato), became professional baseball players.
