= Puerto Rico Trade and Export Company =

Agency overview
- Formed: December 28, 2003; 22 years ago
- Jurisdiction: executive branch
- Headquarters: San Juan, Puerto Rico
- Agency executive: Karla Michelle Angleró-González, Executive Director
- Parent department: Department of Economic Development and Commerce
- Key document: Law No. 323 of 2003
- Website: www.comercioyexportacion.com

The Puerto Rico Trade and Export Company —Spanish: Compañía de Comercio y Exportación de Puerto Rico (CCE)— is the government-owned corporation of Puerto Rico that establishes the island's public policy for the development of its trade industry.

== Directors ==
- 2009–2013: José Pérez Riera
- 2013–2017: Frankie Chévere
- 2017–present: Karla Michelle Angleró-González
