= Bill Gardner (politician) =

American politician (born 1948)

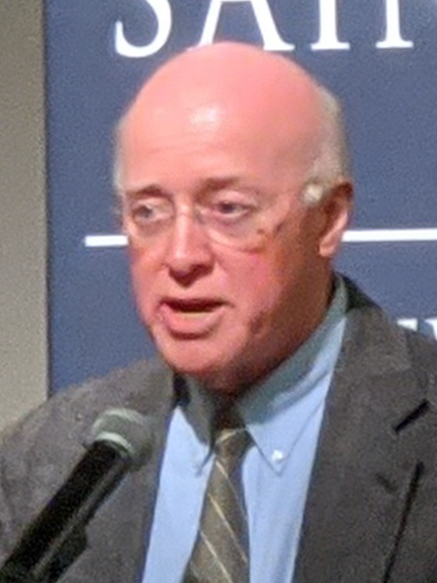

Secretary of State of New Hampshire
- In office December 2, 1976 – January 10, 2022
- Governor: See list: Meldrim Thomson Jr.; Hugh Gallen; Vesta M. Roy (acting); John H. Sununu Judd Gregg; Ralph D. Hough (acting); Steve Merrill; Jeanne Shaheen; Craig Benson; John Lynch; Maggie Hassan; Chuck Morse (acting); Chris Sununu
- Preceded by: Ed Kelly (acting)
- Succeeded by: David Scanlan

Member of the New Hampshire House of Representatives from the 30th Hillsborough district
- In office December 6, 1972 – December 1, 1976 Serving with Mary Sullivan, Edward Clancy, Frank Conway, Dorothy Drewniak
- Preceded by: William Cullity; John Welch; Walter McDermott
- Succeeded by: Gary Girolimon; Edward Crotty; Rudolph Juneau

Personal details
- Born: October 26, 1948 (age 77) Manchester, New Hampshire, U.S.
- Party: Democratic
- Education: University of New Hampshire (BA); Harvard University (MPA); London School of Economics (MSc); University of North Carolina, Greensboro (MA)

Bill Gardner (born October 26, 1948) is an American politician who was the New Hampshire Secretary of State from 1976 to 2022. In that role, he was in charge of the department that oversees all general elections, primary elections, voter registration and recounts within the state, including the New Hampshire primary. His tenure was among the longest of any Secretary of State in U.S. history. He is a member of the Democratic Party.

== Career in politics ==
Gardner began his career in New Hampshire politics as a state representative and was elected Secretary of State in 1976 by the state legislature. He was kept in office by both Democratic and Republican legislatures for more than 40 years. After the November 2018 election, he was narrowly re-elected over Colin Van Ostern in a vote on December 5, 2018.

A strong supporter of New Hampshire's standing as the first in the nation primary state, Gardner wrote Why New Hampshire with the late former Governor Hugh Gregg in October 2003, detailing the history and significance of the New Hampshire primary. He also appears in Winning New Hampshire, released in 2004. As New Hampshire's Secretary of State, he described the principal charge as "protecting the sanctity of New Hampshire’s status as first to hold a full-fledged primary".

Gardner participated in President Donald Trump's voter fraud commission, which was set up by Trump in the wake of Trump's unsubstantiated claims of voter fraud in the 2016 election. Gardner has been criticized for legitimizing the commission, which failed to find evidence of substantial voter fraud. At his opening address for the commission, Gardner called for an analysis of the value of photo ID laws in improving public confidence in elections.

Gardner supported a New Hampshire law which imposed stricter residency requirements for out-of-state students to vote in New Hampshire. The law was later blocked in court. In 2017, Gardner criticized Trump's unsubstantiated claim that out-of-state voters were being bused into New Hampshire to vote.

On January 3, 2022, Gardner announced that he would retire as secretary of state, and resign from the position before the next legislative election for the post. David Scanlan, his deputy since 2002, succeeded Gardner in an acting role a week later.

Political offices
Preceded by Ed Kelly; Acting	Secretary of State of New Hampshire; 1976–2022	Succeeded by David Scanlan
