= William Foye =

Canadian politician

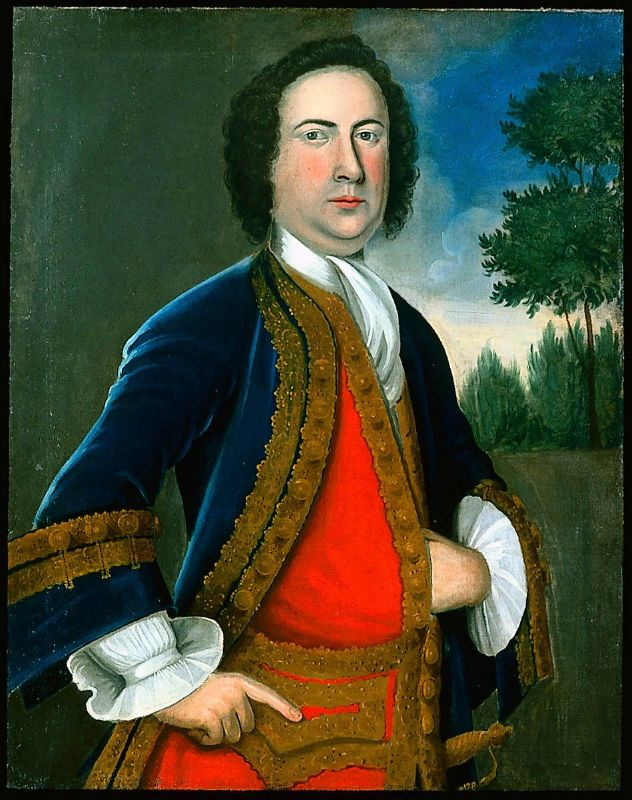
Portrait of William Foye, by Joseph Badger, ca. 1750

William Foye (November 1, 1716 – September 1, 1771) was a political figure in Nova Scotia. He was a member of the Nova Scotia House of Assembly from 1758 to 1759.

He was born in Boston, Massachusetts, the son of William Foye, who served as treasurer and receiver-general of Massachusetts, and Elizabeth Campbell. Foye was educated at Harvard College. He served as lieutenant in the expedition against Cartagena. Foye came to Halifax with Edward Cornwallis in 1749. He served as provost marshal for the province from 1749 until his death and was lieutenant-colonel in the Halifax militia. He died in Halifax at the age of 54.
