= Joseph Pearson (New Hampshire politician) =

American politician

New Hampshire Secretary of State
- In office 1786–1805
- Preceded by: Ebenezer Thompson
- Succeeded by: Philip Carrigan

Personal details
- Born: Joseph Pearson; 1737 Exeter, New Hampshire
- Died: January 1823 (aged 85–86) Concord, New Hampshire
- Education: Harvard College (BA)

Joseph Pearson (1737 – January 1823) was an American politician who served as the New Hampshire Secretary of State from 1786 to 1805. He was also an instructor at Phillips Exeter Academy.
