= Joseph Blackburn (painter) =

English painter

Joseph Blackburn (died 1787) was an English painter who worked mainly in British North America. His notable works include portraits of Hugh Jones (circa 1777) and Colonel Theodore Atkinson (circa 1760).

== Life and career ==
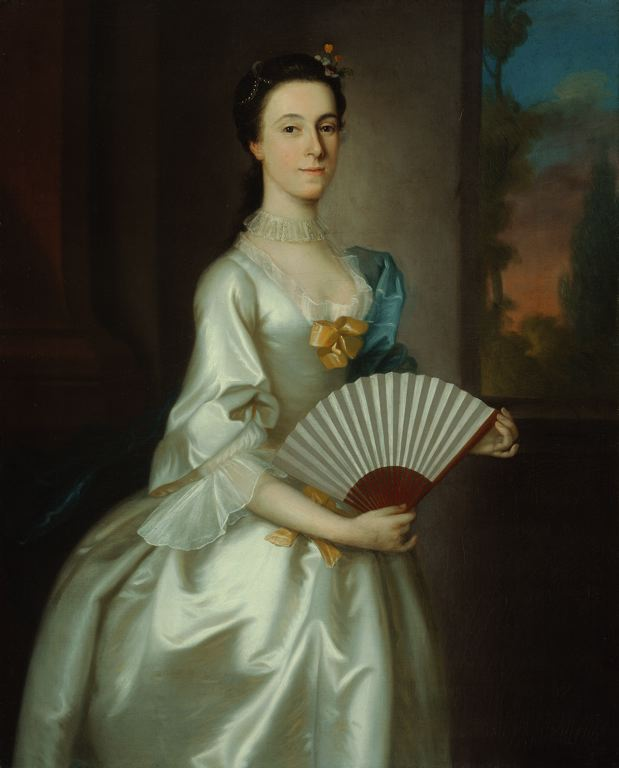
Abigail Chesebrough (Mrs. Alexander Grant), oil on canvas of 1754, in the Art Institute of Chicago

He seems to have been the son of a painter, and to have had a studio in Boston from 1755 until 1765; among his patrons were many important early American families, including the Apthorps, Amorys, Bulfinches, Lowells, Ewings, Saltonstalls, Winthrops, Winslows and Otises of Boston. Blackburn spent time in Bermuda (1752–1753), Newport (1754), Boston (1755–1758), and Portsmouth (1758–1762). In late 1763 he returned to London and painted portraits in southwestern England, Wales, and Dublin between 1768 and 1777. Approximately one hundred fifty of Blackburn's portraits survive. He excelled at painting textiles (i.e., representing the shimmer of silks, the texture of laces, and the folds of fabrics).

Some of his portraits are in the possession of the public library of Lexington, Massachusetts, and of the Massachusetts Historical Society, but most of them are privately owned and are scattered over the country, the majority being in Boston. One portrait, of Elizabeth Browne Rogers completed in 1761, is part of the permanent American art collection at Reynolda House Museum of American Art located in Winston-Salem, North Carolina.

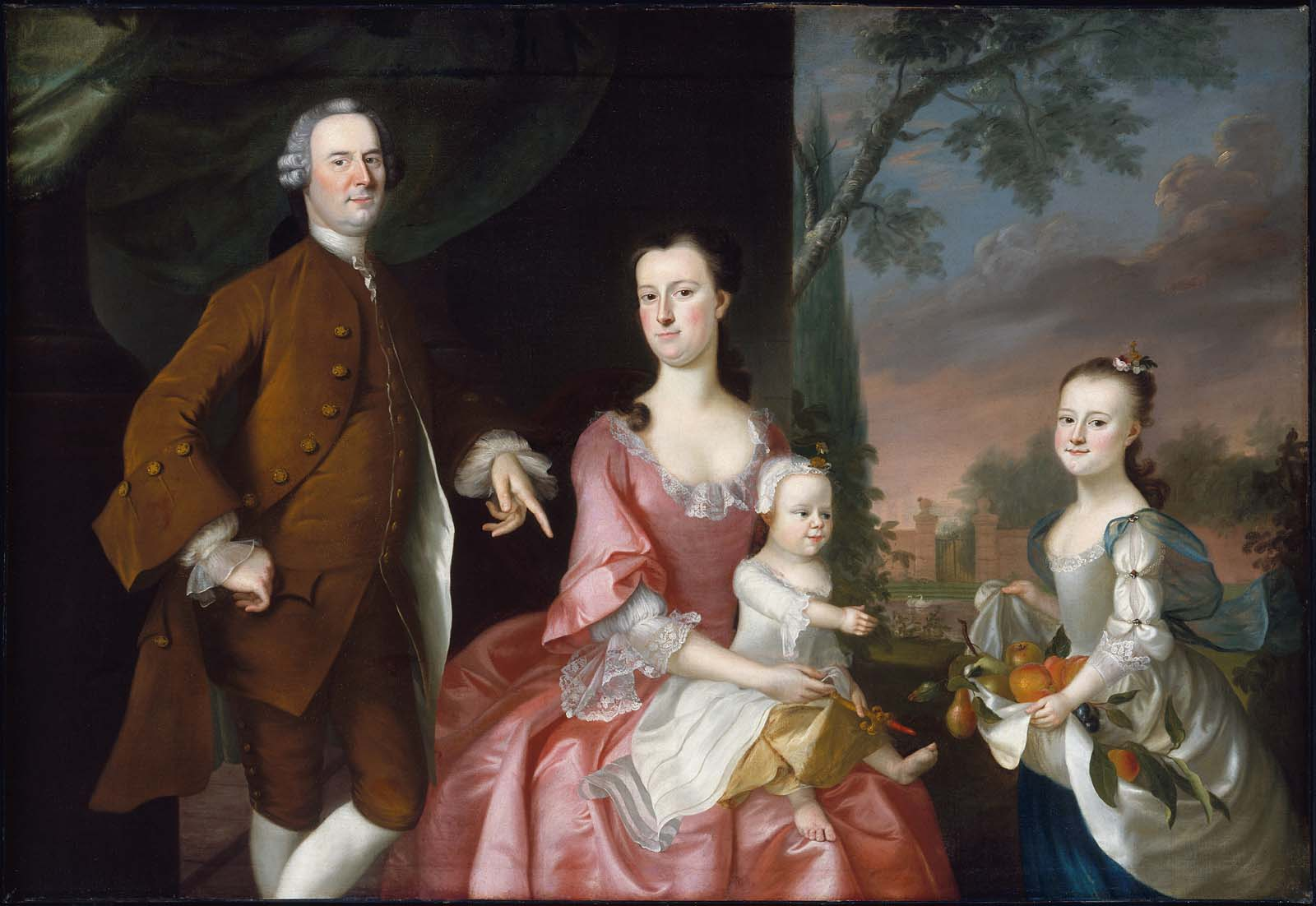
This painting of Isaac Winslow and family, by Joseph Blackburn, is one of the first group portraits in America. Subjects: Isaac Winslow (1707–1770; his wife, Lucy Waldo (1724–1768; m. 1747); elder daughter, Lucy Winslow (1749–1770); child in mother's lap, Hannah Winslow (1755–1819). The painting is in the Museum of Fine Arts, Boston.

John Singleton Copley was Blackburn's pupil, and it is said that he finally left his studio in Boston, through jealousy of Copley's superior success. His pictures were long attributed to Copley.

"Now, thanks to evidence found within records held in our collections, we are able to confirm that Joseph Blackburn lived and died in the city of Worcester. He and his family lived in Broad Street in the parish of St. Nicholas. The exact date they moved there is unclear, but he certainly is a resident in 1768. They also leased properties around St. Martins Gate in the city, including The White Horse pub. Joseph inherited the lease for the properties after his father, Joseph Blackburn, gentleman, of Kinfare, (now Kinver), Staffordshire, and possibly his aunt, Henrietta Blackburn of Worcester died in 1759.

"The 1759 will of Henrietta mentions Joseph’s wife Mary and their two daughters, Henrietta and Elizabeth. His daughters both married local men: Henrietta to William Hill and Elizabeth to George Squire, but both women appear to have died without children. ..."

Art historian Lawrence Park authored, and the American Antiquarian Society published, the first biographical and critical study of Blackburn in 1923, restoring this long-overlooked artist to the attention of scholars and connoisseurs.

== Dates of birth and death ==
There is a degree of confusion about the dates of birth and death of Blackburn. The most common suggestion for year of death is 1778 (see for instance the Encyclopædia Britannica and the American Artists Bluebook) whereas Microsoft Encarta suggests 1774. 1730 is usually posited as the year of birth but it is at best an estimate.

Some sources still give 1700–1765 as Blackburn's years. These most likely derive from the 1911 Encyclopædia Britannica, published prior to Lawrence Park's review, "Joseph Blackburn – Portrait Painter", printed in the Proceedings of the American Antiquarian Society in 1922, which established many of the known works of Blackburn.

In 2015 Worcestershire Archives announced that they had located details of Blackburn's burial in Worcester in 1787.

== Artworks ==
Selected artworks

Year	Title	Image	Dimensions	Collection	Comments
1756	Portrait of William Browne, oil on canvas			Bermuda Historical Society, Hamilton, Bermuda	Subject: College portrait of William Brown of Salem, Massachusetts, while attending Harvard College; He was a Massachusetts Judge and later Royal Governor of Bermuda.
1760	Portrait of Colonel Theodore Atkinson, oil on canvas	view	50 × 40 1/4 in. (127.0 × 102.2 cm.) [also reported as 47 1/2 × 39 1/4 in. (120.7 × 99.7 cm.)]	Worcester Art Museum, Worcester, Massachusetts	Subject: lived 1697–1779; husband of Hannah Wentworth (1700-1769); colonial chief justice of New Hampshire Superior Court. IAP 80970127 and IAP 23570023
1760	Benning Wentworth, oil on canvas		H-93.5 W-58 inches	New Hampshire Historical Society, Concord, New Hampshire	Subject: lived 1696–1770, governor of New Hampshire, Bennington, Vermont is named after him.
1760	Portrait of Mrs. Theodore Atkinson, oil on canvas	view	49 1/8 × 39 1/8 in. (124.8 × 99.4 cm.)	Worcester Art Museum, Worcester, Massachusetts (listed in collection of Cleveland Museum of Art, Cleveland, Ohio)	Subject: Hannah Wentworth (1700-1769); sister of first royal governor of New Hampshire; wife of Colonel Theodore Atkinson (colonial chief justice of New Hampshire Superior Court). IAP 41000005
1761	Thomas Wentworth, oil on canvas			San Diego Museum of Art, San Diego, California	Subject: Thomas Wentworth (1740-1768)
1761	Portrait of Elizabeth Browne Rogers, oil on canvas	view	50 × 40 in. (127.0 × 101.6 cm.)	Reynolda House Museum of American Art, Winston-Salem, North Carolina	Subject: Elizabeth Browne (1741-1813); youngest daughter of Rev. Arthur Browne (1699-1773; Anglican rector of socially prominent Queen's Chapel in Portsmouth, New Hampshire); wife of Robert Rogers (1731–1795; well-known French and Indian War hero of Rogers' Rangers fame; m. 1761); later wife of John Roche (sea captain, fur-trader). IAP 80960021 and IAP 40010032
1762	Portrait of Ann Saltonstall, oil				IAP 71930550
1762	Portrait of Anne Saltonstall, oil on canvas		30 1/2 × 24 7/8 in. (127.6 × 102.6 cm.)	San Antonio Museum of Art, San Antonio, Texas	IAP 67930001
1762	Portrait of Samuel Cutts (1762-1763), oil on canvas	view	50 1/4 × 40 3/8 in. (127.6 × 102.6 cm.)	Metropolitan Museum of Art, New York City	Subject: lived 1726–1801. IAP 71560037
1762	Portrait of Mrs. Samuel Cutts (1762-1763), oil on canvas	view	50 1/4 × 40 1/2 in. (127.6 × 102.9 cm.)	Metropolitan Museum of Art, New York City	Subject: lived 1735–1812. IAP 71560038
1764	Portrait of Hugh Jones, last known dated portrait by this artist		50 9/16 × 40 1/4 in. (128.4 × 102.2 cm.)	Worcester Art Museum, Worcester, Massachusetts	IAP 23570266
