= Joseph Badger =

American artist (1707–1765)

- Born: c. 1707; Boston, Massachusetts, Great Britain
- Died: 11 May 1765 (aged c. 58); Boston, Massachusetts, Great Britain
- Spouse: Katharine Felch (m. 1731)
- Parent(s): Stephen Badger; Mercy Kettell

Joseph Badger (c. 1707 – 11 May 1765) was a portrait artist in Boston, Massachusetts, in the 18th century. He was born in Charlestown, Massachusetts, to tailor Stephen Badger and Mercy Kettell. He "began his career as a house-painter and glazier, and ... throughout his life continued this work, besides painting signs, hatchments and other heraldic devices, in order to eke out a livelihood when orders for portraits slackened." In 1731 he married Katharine Felch; they moved to Boston around 1733. He was a member of the Brattle Street Church. He died in Boston on 11 May 1765, when "on Saturday last one Mr. Badger, of this Town, Painter, was taken with an Apoplectic Fit as he was walking in his Garden, and expired in a few Minutes after." Works by Badger are in the collections of the Worcester Art Museum, the Museum of Fine Arts Boston, and Historic New England's Phillips House, Salem, Mass. While respected in his own time, subsequent scholars and connoisseurs largely overlooked Badger's significance until Lawrence Park wrote a book about him in 1918.

== Portrait subjects ==
- James Bowdoin (1676–1747), father of Massachusetts governor James Bowdoin
- Elizabeth Campbell, wife of William Foye
- William Cooper (1716–1743), pastor of the Brattle St. Church, Boston
- Andrew Croswell (1709–1785), pastor of King's Chapel, Boston
- Thomas Cushing (1696–1746), speaker of the Massachusetts House of Representatives, and father of Thomas Cushing
- Thomas Dawes
- Jonathan Edwards
- Josiah Flagg and Jane Flagg Greene, descendants of Jane Franklin, sister to Benjamin Franklin
- William Foye
- Esther Orne Gardner (c. 1714-1755)
- Ellis Gray (1715–1753), pastor of Old North Church, Boston
- John Haskins (1729–1814), grandfather of Ralph Waldo Emerson
- John Homans (1753–1800), doctor
- Joseph Jackson (1707–1790)
- John Larrabee (1686–1792), commanding officer of Castle William, Massachusetts
- Rev. Dudley Leavitt (1720–1762)
- Mrs. Dudley Leavitt (née Mary Pickering) (1733–1805), sister of Timothy Pickering
- Elizabeth Marion (1721–1746), wife of William Story, and grandmother of Joseph Story
- John Marston (1715–1786), proprietor of Boston's Bunch-of-Grapes tavern during the American Revolution
- Lois Orne, wife of William Paine
- Rebecca Orne
- Thomas Prince
- William Scott, shoemaker, Boston
- Elizabeth Storer, wife of Boston merchant-shipowner Isaac Smith (1719–1787)
- William Tyler (1688–1758), business partner of Thomas Hancock
- Cornelius Waldo (1684–1753)
- George Whitefield

== Image gallery ==
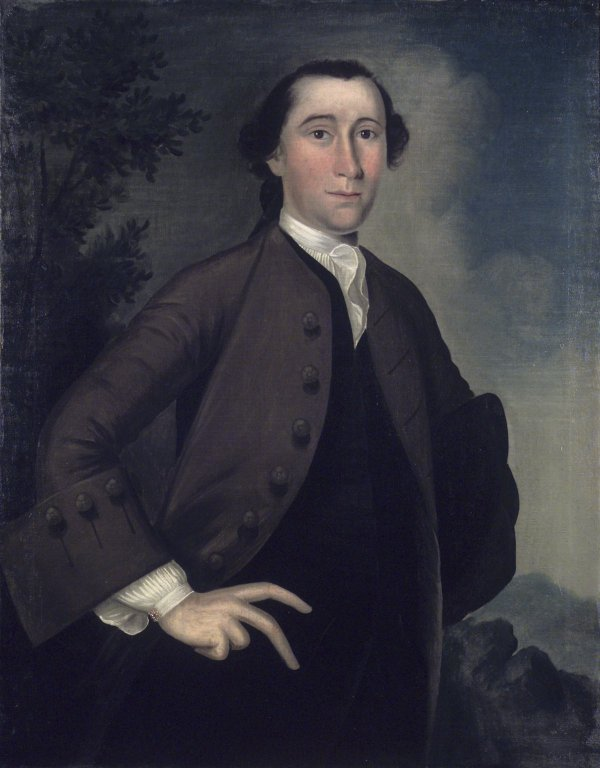
John Haskins, 1759 (Brooklyn Museum)

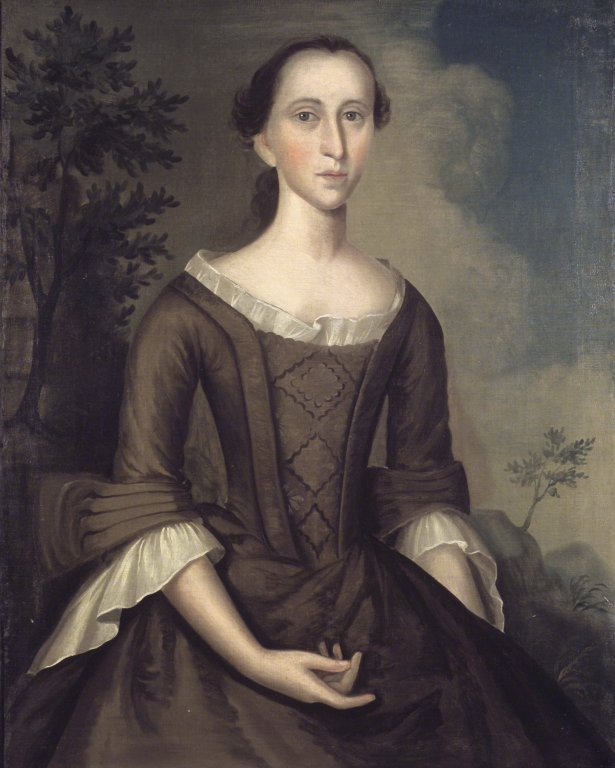
Mrs. John Haskins (née Hannah Upham), 1759 (Brooklyn Museum)

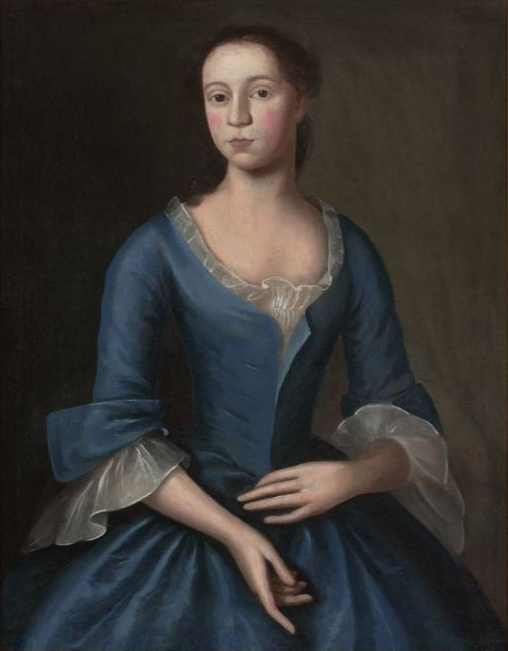
Portrait of Elizabeth Storer, around 1746 (Museum of Fine Arts, Boston)

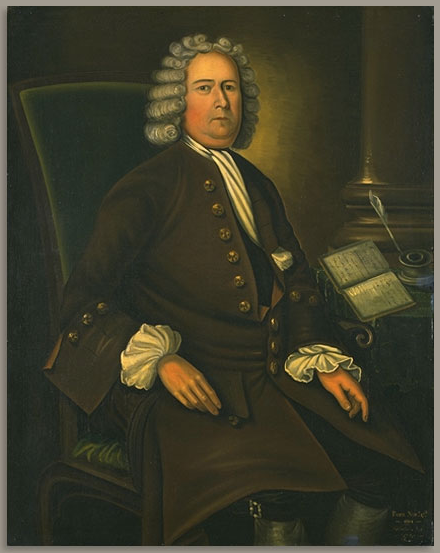
Portrait of Cornelius Waldo, 1750 (Worcester Art Museum, Massachusetts)

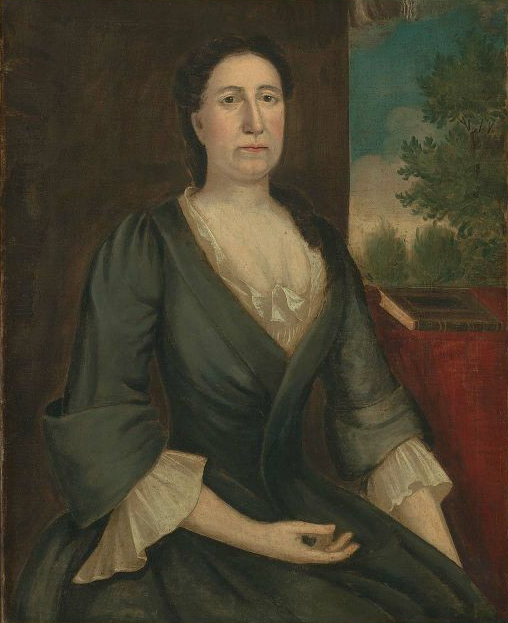
Portrait of Elizabeth Campbell, around 1750 (Museum of Fine Arts, Boston)

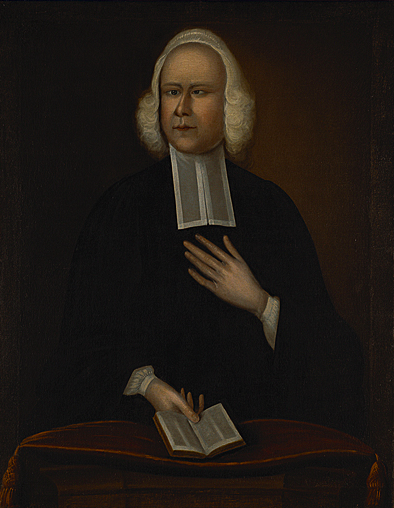
Portrait of George Whitefield, around 1755, attributed to Badger (Harvard University)

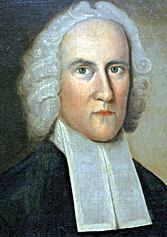
Detail of portrait of Jonathan Edwards (Yale University)

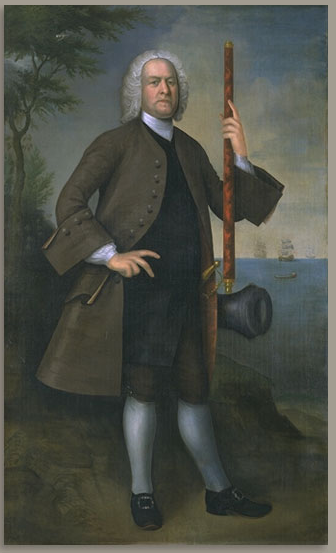
Portrait of John Larrabee, around 1750 (Worcester Art Museum, Massachusetts)

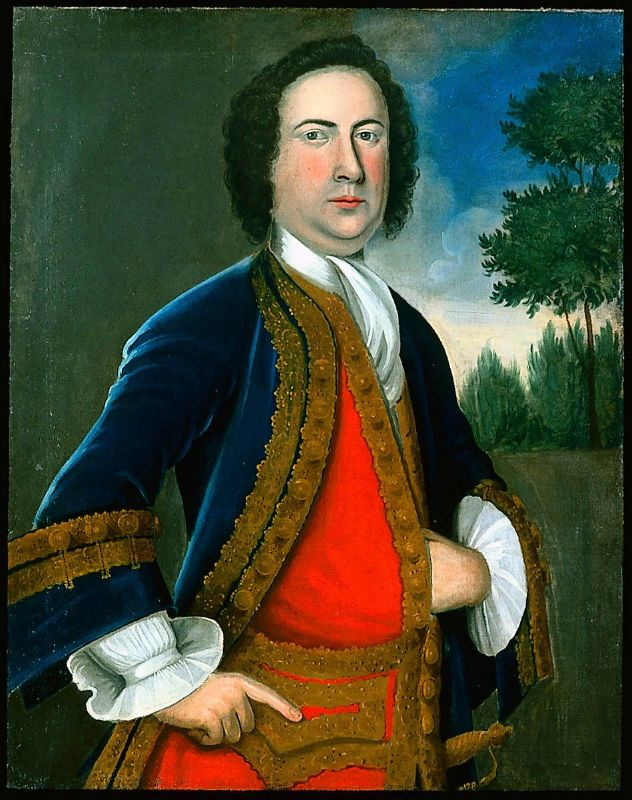
Portrait of William Foye, Jr., around 1750 (Museum of Fine Arts, Boston)

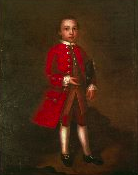
Portrait of Thomas Dawes, around 1764
