= Theodore Atkinson Jr. =

American politician

New Hampshire Secretary of State
- In office 1762–1769
- Preceded by: Theodore Atkinson
- Succeeded by: Theodore Atkinson

Personal details
- Born: Theodore Atkinson Jr. 1737 Portsmouth, New Hampshire
- Died: October 28, 1769 (aged 31–32) Portsmouth, New Hampshire
- Education: Harvard College (BA)

Theodore Atkinson Jr. (1737 - October 28, 1769) was an American politician who served as the New Hampshire Secretary of State from 1762 to 1769. His term ended when he died of tuberculosis.
