= Craig A. Downing =

American politician

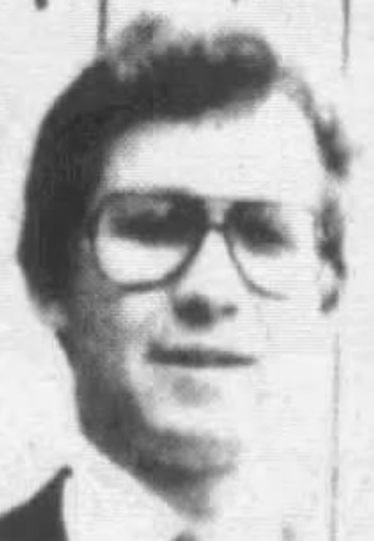
- Downing in 1982

Member of the New Hampshire House of Representatives from the Grafton 11th district
- In office 1982–1984
- Preceded by: William J. Driscoll; Neil F. McIver
- Succeeded by: David Scanlan

Personal details
- Party: Republican
- Education: Keene State College

Craig A. Downing is an American politician. A member of the Republican Party, he served in the New Hampshire House of Representatives from 1982 to 1984.
