= Edward Nathan Pearson =

American politician (1859-1924)

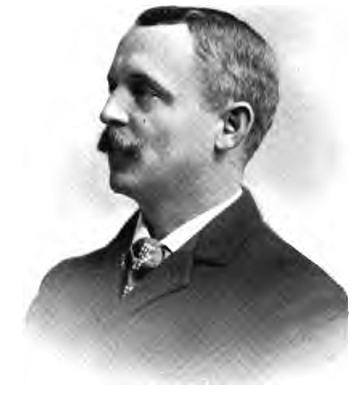
Edward Nathan Pearson

Edward Nathan Pearson (September 7, 1859 – January 26, 1924) was the New Hampshire Secretary of State from 1899 to 1915.

== Biography ==
He was born in West Boscawen, New Hampshire, September 7, 1859, the son of John Couch and Elizabeth S. (Colby) Pearson. He prepared for college in the high school at Warner and the academy at Penacook and graduated from Dartmouth College in the class of 1881. Immediately upon graduation he entered the employ of the Republican Press Association at Concord, New Hampshire, as city editor of the Concord Evening Monitor. With the exception of one year spent in Washington, D.C., as teacher in a public school, Pearson continued his connection with the Republican Press Association and its papers, the Evening Monitor and Independent Statesman, for almost twenty years, acting during nearly half that time as managing editor of the papers and business manager of the plant.

During his connection with the Republican Press Association he was elected Public Printer of the state and served from 1894 to 1895. In 1899 he was chosen Secretary of State.

Pearson was for several years a member of the Board of Health of Concord and an officer of the Association of Boards of Health of the state. He resigned these positions upon his election to the Board of Education of the Union School District in Concord. He was a vice-president of the general alumni association of Dartmouth College and served on the committee for the nomination of candidates for alumni trustee. He was also an officer of the New Hampshire Press Association and of other organizations. He was a member of the Patrons of Husbandry and other fraternal orders and attended South Congregational Church in Concord. On December 8, 1882, he was married to Addie Marie Sargent of Lebanon. They had four children. Person died at the age of 64 on January 26, 1924, in Concord, where he is interred at the Blossom Hill Cemetery.
