= New Hampshire Division of Vital Records Administration =

Division within the New Hampshire State Department

- State seal

Agency overview
- Jurisdiction: New Hampshire
- Headquarters: State House, Concord, NH
- Employees: 10
- Agency executive: Denise M. Gonyer, Director of Vital Records
- Parent department: N.H. Dept. of State
- Website: https://sos.nh.gov/

The New Hampshire Division of Vital Records Administration, or NHDVRA, is a division within the New Hampshire Department of State, responsible for the administration and proper archival of vital records and certificates, such as birth certificates, death certificates, marriage certificates among other important documents. The department, consisting of ten employees, is led by the Director of Vital Records, a position currently held by former Gilford town clerk, Denise M. Gonyer, since July 15, 2019.

== Activities ==
The Division of Vital Records Administration is responsible for the administration, archival and maintenance of birth, death, marriage and divorce certificates. The NHDVRA contracts Client Network Services, Inc. to maintain their records portal, the New Hampshire Vital Records Information Network.

== Notable events ==
=== NeCOD app ===
In 2020, the New Hampshire Division of Vital Records Administration released a groundbreaking medical app called "NeCOD" (National Electronic Certification of Death), which allows for the remote tracking, issuing and viewing of death certificates. The app, the first of its kind to be released in the United States, was developed in response to the COVID-19 pandemic, when first responders could only make limited contact with infected patients without risking infection themselves. The Centers for Disease Control and Prevention (CDC) praised the NHDVRA, stating "NeCOD is the only application available with those technological advances".
