= Theodore Atkinson =

American politician, lawyer and militia officer (1697–1779)

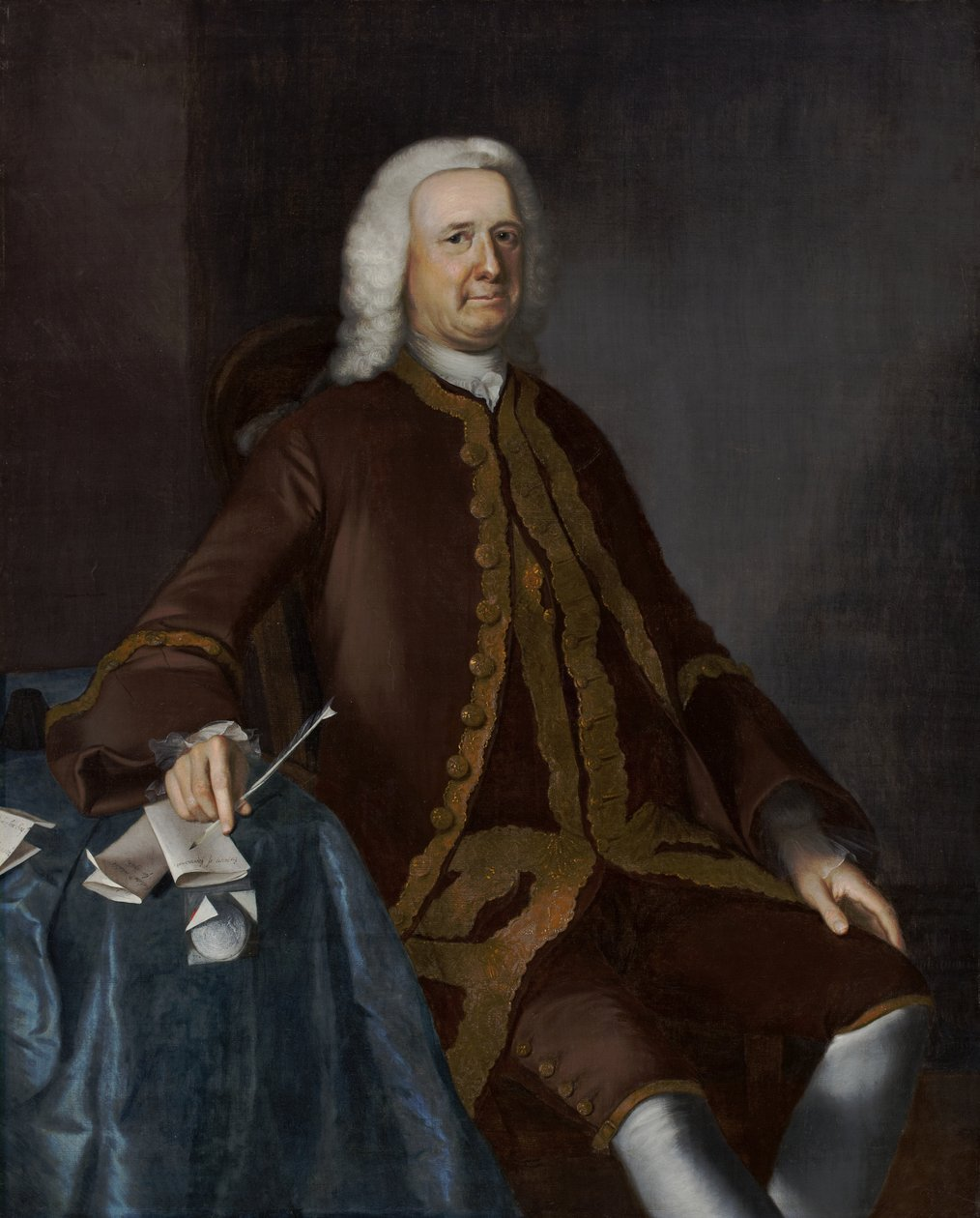
- Portrait by Joseph Blackburn, 1760

Secretary of New Hampshire
- In office 1741–1762
- Preceded by: Richard Waldron
- Succeeded by: Theodore Atkinson Jr.

Personal details
- Born: December 20, 1697 New Castle, New Hampshire
- Died: September 22, 1779 (aged 81) Portsmouth, New Hampshire
- Parent(s): Theodore Atkinson III; Mary Atkinson
- Education: Harvard College (g. 1718)
- Occupation: Politician, lawyer, military officer

Military service
- Allegiance: New Hampshire
- Branch/service: New Hampshire Militia
- Rank: Colonel

Colonel Theodore Atkinson (December 20, 1697 – September 22, 1779) was an American politician, lawyer and militia officer who served as the secretary of New Hampshire from 1741 to 1762.

== Early life ==
Theodore Atkinson was born in New Castle, New Hampshire on December 20, 1697. His parents were Colonel Theodore Atkinson III and his wife Mary. Atkinson was sent to study at Harvard College, graduating from the institution in 1718. A year later, his father died, and by the mid-1730's, Atkinson had moved to Portsmouth, New Hampshire, where he worked as a lawyer.

== Political and military career ==
In 1741, Atkinson was appointed as the secretary of New Hampshire, serving in the office until 1762, when he passed it to his son Theodore. However, after Theodore died in 1769, Atkinson once again served in the office until 1775. Atkins also served in the New Hampshire Militia at the rank of colonel.

== Later life and death ==
Atkinson died in Portsmouth on September 22, 1779.
