= Lawrence Park (art historian) =

American art historian, architect, and genealogist

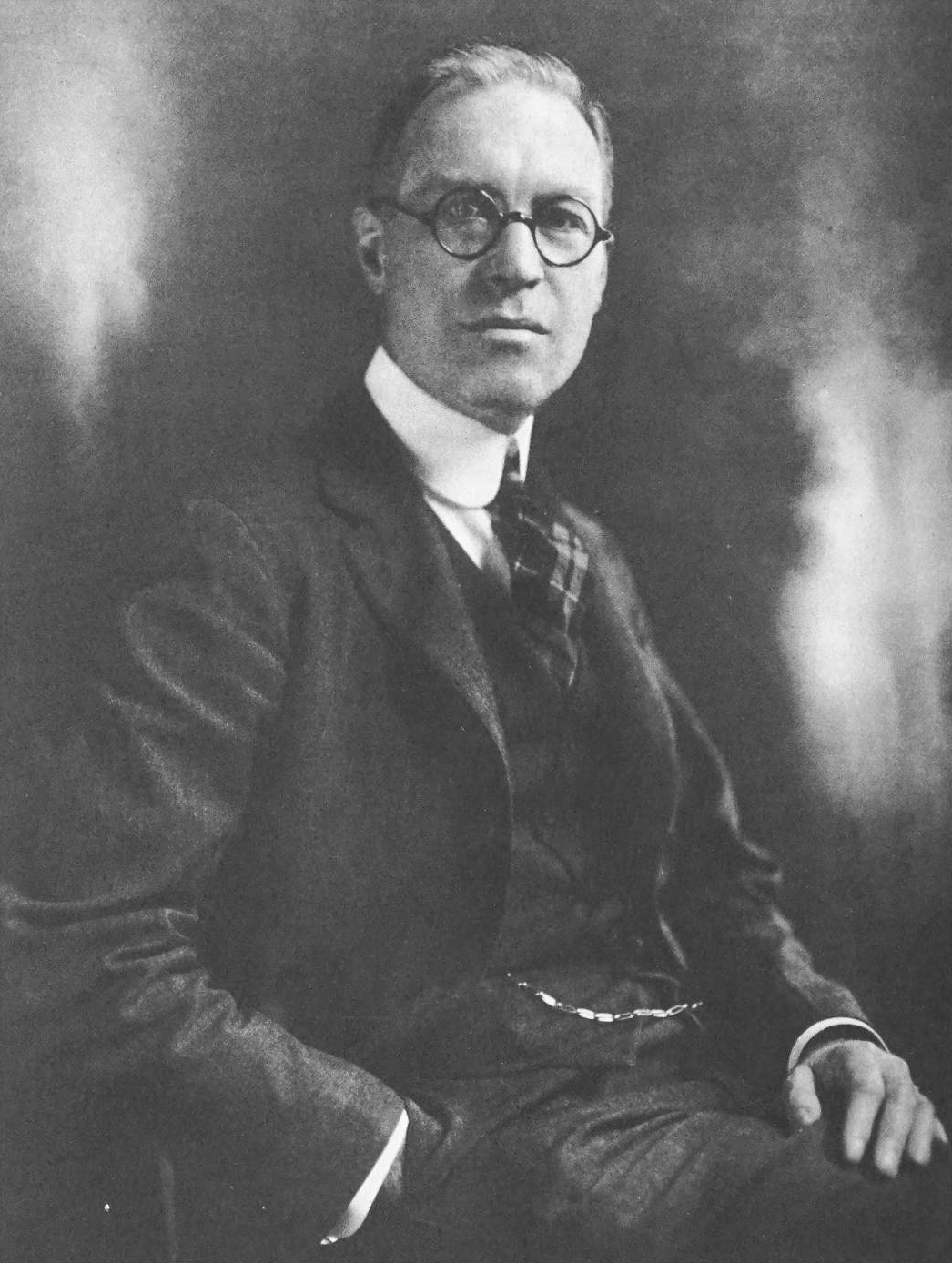
- Born: December 16, 1873; Worcester, Massachusetts, US
- Died: September 28, 1924 (aged 50); Groton, Massachusetts, US
- Education: Harvard University; School of the Museum of Fine Arts, Boston
- Occupations: Art historian, architect, genealogist
- Known for: Influential studies of early American portrait painters

Signature
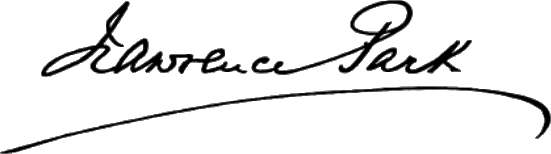

Lawrence Park (December 16, 1873 – September 28, 1924) was an American art historian, architect, and genealogist who authored pioneering critical and biographical studies of portrait painters Gilbert Stuart, Joseph Badger, and Joseph Blackburn, active during the colonial and early federal periods of the United States. Park's four-volume treatise on Stuart was published posthumously in 1926. Park's papers are held at the Winterthur Library and the Frick Art Reference Library.

== Early life and education ==
Park was born in Worcester, Massachusetts, to parents John Gray Park, a psychiatrist, and Elizabeth Bigelow Lawrence. He attended a private school in Worcester and attended Harvard University from 1892 to 1896 without receiving his degree. He studied at the School of Drawing and Painting at the Museum of Fine Arts, Boston from 1896 to 1897. He worked as a drafter at a well-known Boston architectural firm from 1897 to 1901, when he launched his own architectural firm, Park & Kendall, with partner Robert R. Kendall. On November 16, 1905, he married Maria Davis Motley, a grandniece of John Lothrop Motley; they had four children. Aided by family wealth, Park gave up his business in 1914 to focus on his historical and curatorial work.

== Historical and curatorial work ==
Long interested in genealogy and family portraits, Park embarked on his new career in 1914, when he published his first foray into historical scholarship, a genealogy called Major Thomas Savage of Boston and His Descendants (first published in the New England Historical and Genealogical Register, Vols. 67 and 68; reprinted by D. Clapp & Son of Boston in 1914).

Next, Park began researching early American portrait painters, traveling to view their works and making detailed notes and pencil sketches. His monograph on colonial Massachusetts painter Joseph Badger appeared in the Proceedings of the Massachusetts Historical Society in December 1917 (reprinted by the University Press of Boston as a standalone publication in 1918). Joseph Blackburn: A Colonial Portrait Painter appeared in Proceedings of the American Antiquarian Society in October 1922 (reprinted by the American Antiquarian Society as a standalone publication in 1923). Both books revived interest in these largely forgotten painters. Per art historian David Meschutt, his "thoroughly researched publications, each containing a biographical sketch of the artist and a catalog of his paintings, are the definitive studies of both painters."

Park's magnum opum, a four-volume biography and descriptive catalog of renowned American portraitist Gilbert Stuart, was completed and published posthumously in 1926. According to Meschutt, "his catalog of the work of Stuart, though now dated, was the first useful listing of that artist's extensive oeuvre and is still used today."

== Memberships and service ==
As his reputation mounted, Park became a member of the American Antiquarian Society, the Massachusetts Historical Society, the New England Historic Genealogical Society, the Massachusetts Society of Colonial Wars, the Society for the Preservation of New England Antiquities, and others. He became a member of the corporation of the Worcester Art Museum in 1917 and nonresidential curator of colonial art at the Cleveland Museum of Art in 1919. In 1921 he accompanied field researchers from the Frick Art Reference Library surveying early American portraits in Virginia, and the following year he accompanied a second Frick expedition to South Carolina.

== Personal life and death ==
Park's health began to fail soon after his return from the South. He died at his home in Groton, Massachusetts, in 1924 at the age of 50.

== Publications ==
- Park, Lawrence (1926). Gilbert Stuart: An Illustrated Descriptive List of His Works Compiled by Lawrence Park, with an Account of His Life by John Hill Morgan and an Appreciation by Royal Cortissoz. Vol. 1–4. New York: William Edwin Rudge – via HathiTrust.
- Park, Lawrence (1923). Joseph Blackburn: A Colonial Portrait Painter; With a Descriptive List of His Works. Worcester: American Antiquarian Society – via HathiTrust.
- Park, Lawrence (1918). Joseph Badger (1708–1765) and a Descriptive List of Some of His Works. Boston: The University Press – via HathiTrust.
- Park, Lawrence (1914). Major Thomas Savage of Boston and His Descendants. Boston: Press of David Clapp & Son – via HathiTrust.
