= José Pérez Riera =

Puerto Rican politician

José Ramón Pérez Riera was the former Secretary of Economic Development and Commerce of Puerto Rico. He served as chairman of the Board of several public corporations and was named to the Intergovernmental Policy Advisory Committee on Trade, which advises and makes recommendations to the U.S. Trade Representative. Has a Bachelor of Arts from Georgetown University and a Doctor in Law from the Georgetown University Law Center.
