= New Hampshire Secretary of State =

Constitutional officer in the U.S. state of New Hampshire

Secretary of State of New Hampshire
- State seal

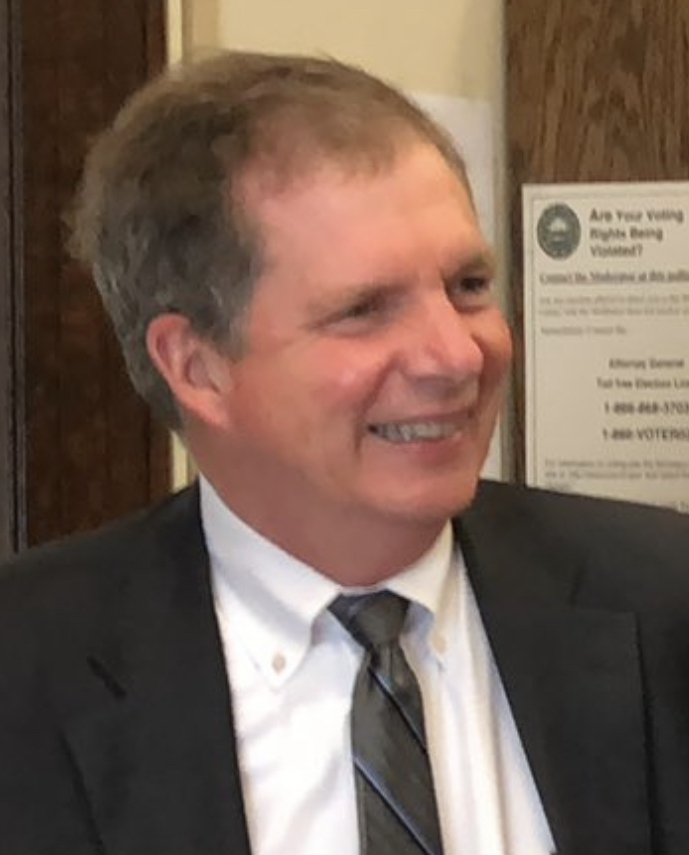
- Incumbent; David Scanlan since January 10, 2022
- Government of New Hampshire
- Seat: Concord, New Hampshire
- Term length: Two years, no term limit
- Constituting instrument: New Hampshire Constitution of 1776
- Formation: January 21, 1680 (346 years ago)
- Succession: Third
- Website: sos.nh.gov

The secretary of state of New Hampshire is a constitutional officer in the U.S. state of New Hampshire and serves as the exclusive head of the New Hampshire Department of State. The secretary is third in line for succession as acting governor of New Hampshire, following the state's president of the Senate and speaker of the House. The secretary oversees all state elections, including certifying the results, and keeps the official records of the state. The secretary is, by statute, the only person who can authorize use of the State Seal.

The secretary is elected biennially by the New Hampshire General Court (state legislature), as prescribed in the Constitution of New Hampshire as adopted in 1784. The position itself dates to 1680, when the Province of New Hampshire was under British rule.

== List of officeholders ==
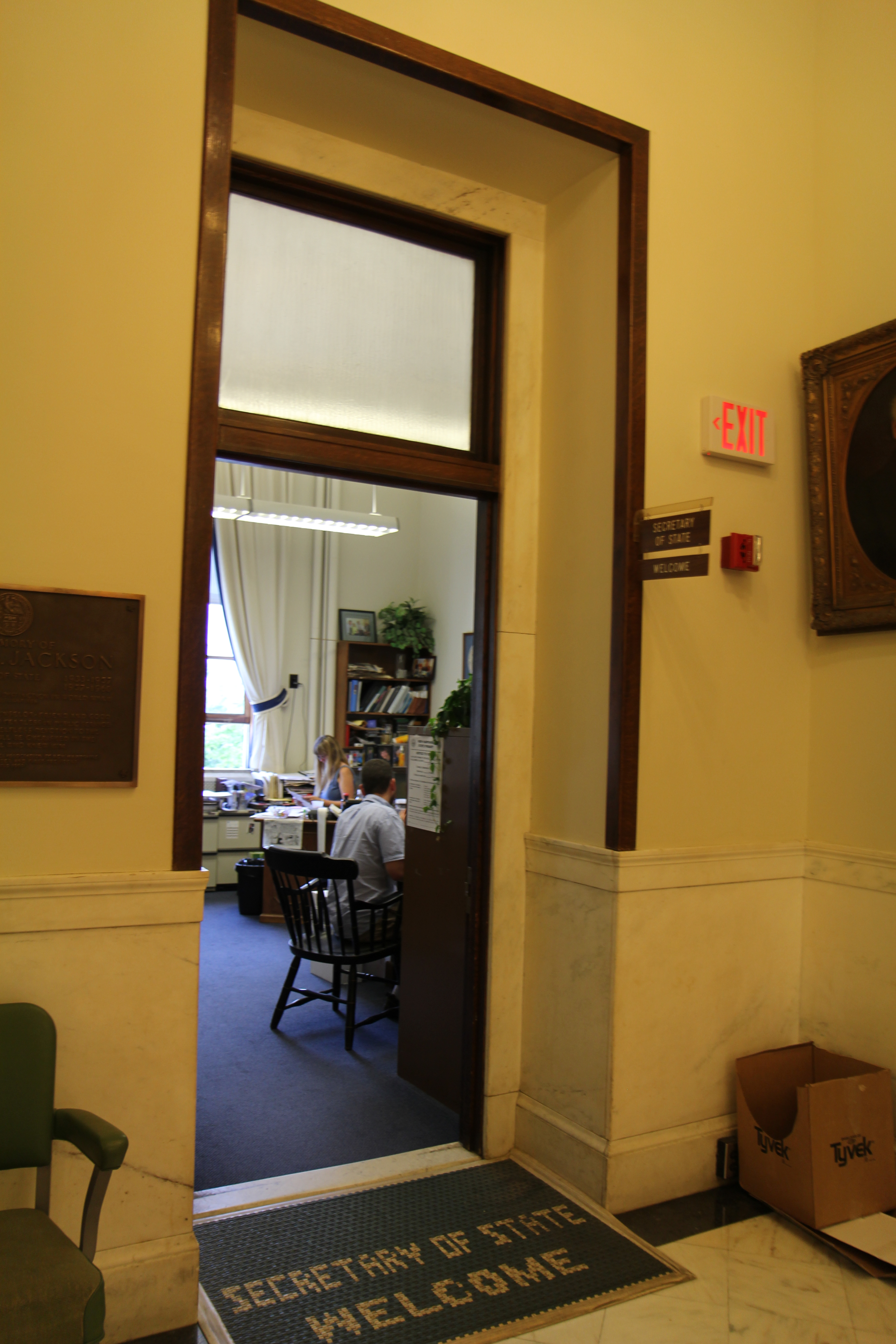
Office of the Secretary of State

#	Image	Name	Term of office	Party
1		Elias Stileman	1680–1682	
2		Richard Chamberlain	1682–1693	
3		Thomas Davis	1692–1693	
4		Thomas Newton	1693–1696	
5		Henry Penny	1696–1697	
6		Charles Story	1697–1698	
7		Henry Penny	1698	
8		Sampson Sheafe	1698–1699	
9		Charles Story	1699–1704	
10		Samuel Penhallow	1704–1705	
11		Charles Story	1705–1719	
12		Richard Waldron	1719–1730	
13		Richard Waldron Jr.	1730–1741	
14		Theodore Atkinson	1741–1762	
15		Theodore Atkinson Jr.	1762–1769	
16		Theodore Atkinson	1769–1775	
17		Ebenezer Thompson	1775–1786	
18		Joseph Pearson	1786–1805	
19		Philip Carrigan	1805–1809	
20		Nathaniel Parker	1809–1810	
21		Samuel Sparhawk	1810–1814	
22		Albe Cady	1814–1816	
23		Samuel Sparhawk	1816–1825	
24		Richard Bartlett	1825–1829	
25		Dudley S. Palmer	1829–1831	
26		Ralph Metcalf	1831–1838	Democratic
27		Josiah Stevens Jr.	1838–1843	
28		Thomas P. Treadwell	1843–1846	
29		George G. Fogg	1846–1847	Republican
30		Thomas P. Treadwell	1847–1850	
31		John L. Hadley	1850–1855	
32		Lemuel N. Pattee	1855–1858	
33		Thomas L. Tullock	1858–1861	
34		Allen Tenney	1861–1865	
35		Benjamin Gerrish Jr.	1865	
36		Walter Harriman	1865–1867	Union
37		John D. Lyman	1867–1870	
38		Nathan W. Gove	1870–1871	
39		John H. Goodale	1871–1872	
40		Benjamin F. Prescott	1872–1873	Republican
41		William Butterfield	1874–1875	
42		Benjamin F. Prescott	1875–1876	
43		Ali B. Thompson	1877–1890	
44		Clarence B. Randlett	1890–1891	
46		Ezra S. Stearns	1891–1899	Republican
46		Edward Nathan Pearson	1899–1915	Republican
47		Edwin C. Bean	1915–1923	Republican
48		Enos K. Sawyer	1923–1925	Democratic
49		Hobart Pillsbury	1925–1929	Republican
50		Enoch D. Fuller	1929–1957	Republican
51		Harry E. Jackson	1957–1960	Republican
52		Robert L. Stark	1960–1976	Republican
53		Bill Gardner	1976–2022	Democratic
54		David Scanlan	2022–present	Republican

== See also ==
- Attorney General of New Hampshire
