= Sebastián Negrón Reichard =

Puerto Rican attorney and politician

Secretary of Economic Development and Commerce of Puerto Rico
- In office February 3, 2025 – May 26, 2026
- Governor: Jenniffer González

Personal details
- Born: San Juan, Puerto Rico
- Party: New Progressive Party
- Education: University of Pennsylvania (Wharton School) (BS); University of Pennsylvania (BA); Harvard Law School (JD); Harvard Business School (MBA)

Sebastián Negrón Reichard is a Puerto Rican attorney and public servant who currently served as the Secretary of Economic Development and Commerce of Puerto Rico (DDEC) of Puerto Rico from 2025 to 2026. He was confirmed to the position by the Senate of Puerto Rico on February 3, 2025. Prior to his appointment, he held several key roles in both the public and private sectors, including serving as Chief of Staff for the Financial Oversight and Management Board for Puerto Rico.

== Early life and education ==
Negrón Reichard was born in San Juan, Puerto Rico. He graduated from Colegio San Ignacio de Loyola. He comes from a family with a history of public service in Puerto Rico.

He attended the University of Pennsylvania, where he completed the Huntsman Program in International Studies and Business. He earned a Bachelor of Science in Economics from the Wharton School and a Bachelor of Arts in International Studies. He later earned a joint Juris Doctor and Master of Business Administration (J.D./M.B.A.) from Harvard Law School and Harvard Business School.

== Career ==
Negrón Reichard began his career as a strategy consultant at Accenture in New York. In 2017, he joined the Financial Oversight and Management Board for Puerto Rico, where he eventually became Chief of Staff. In this role, he was involved in the restructuring of Puerto Rico's debt. An article from 2018 by the Centro de Periodismo Investigativo (Center for Investigative Journalism) mentioned him as the Deputy Office Director (subdirector de oficina) at the board.

In January 2025, he was appointed as the Secretary of the Department of Economic Development and Commerce (DDEC) of Puerto Rico. His appointment was confirmed by the Senate of Puerto Rico on February 3, 2025. As Secretary, he has focused on promoting economic growth independent of federal funds and redefining the island's economic priorities.

Negrón resigned as DDEC secretary on May 26, 2026, citing excessive interference by the administration of governor Jenniffer González-Colón.
