= Puerto Rico Chamber of Commerce =

Non-profit organization

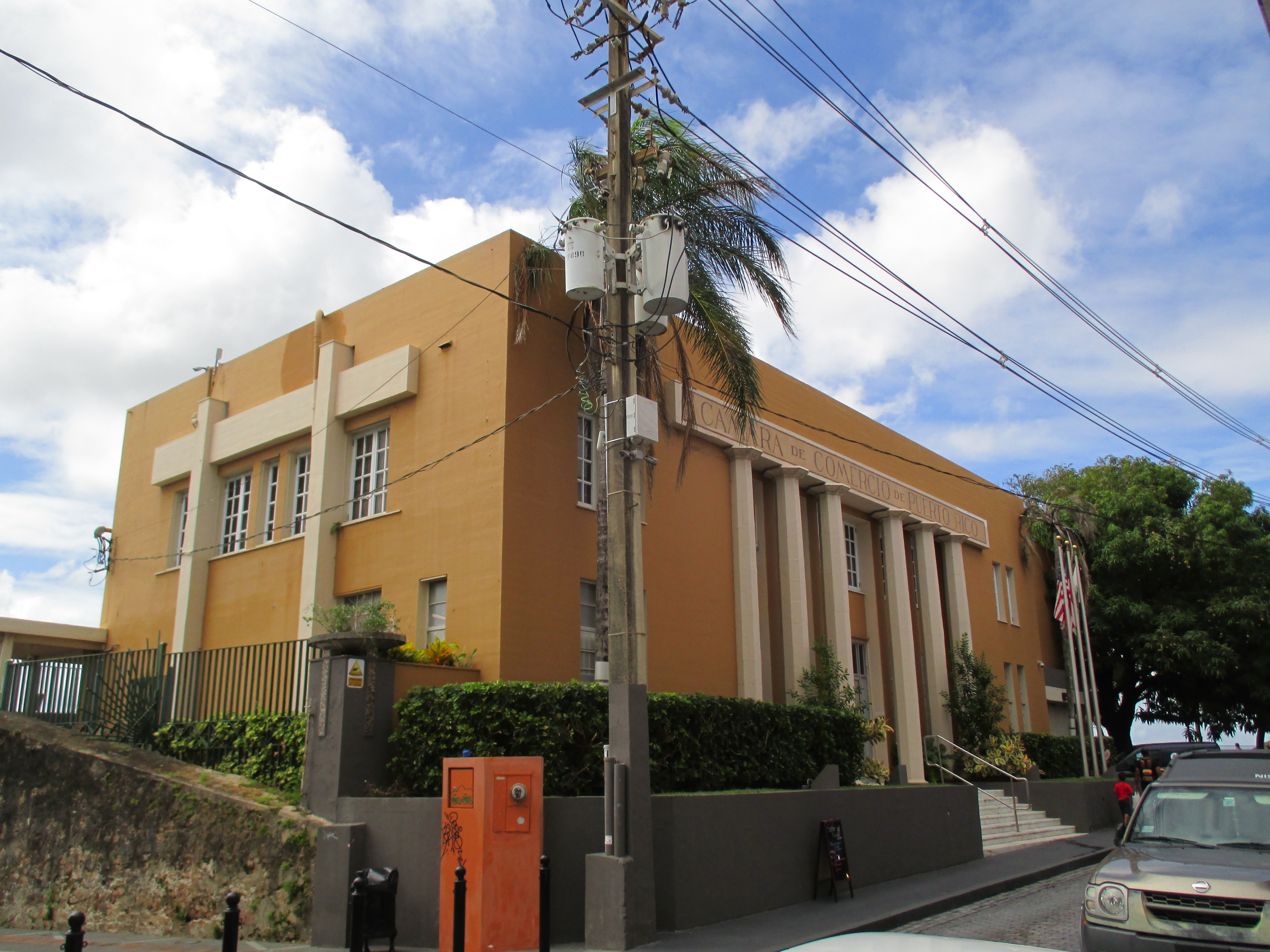
- Founded: 1913 (113 years ago)
- Type: chamber of commerce
- Purpose: commerce and trade
- Location: San Juan, Puerto Rico
- Region served: Puerto Rico
- Website: www.camarapr.org
- Formerly called: San Juan Securities and Supplies Llotja

The Puerto Rico Chamber of Commerce —Spanish: Cámara de Comercio de Puerto Rico (CCPR)— is a private, voluntary, and non-profit chamber of commerce in Puerto Rico. The Chamber was formed in 1913 as the San Juan Securities and Supplies Llotja (Spanish: Lonja de Valores y Víveres de San Juan) by a group of businessmen for the purpose of mutual protection in matters strictly related to their individual companies. Originally designed to serve as a board of arbitration for the settlement of disputes between merchants, the Llotja managed to become the center of thought and the business of San Juan, and to some extent the rest of the island. Today, the Chamber groups businesses with presence in Puerto Rico and serves as their primary lobby group upon the Legislative Assembly of Puerto Rico.
