= David Scanlan =

American politician

Dave Scanlan
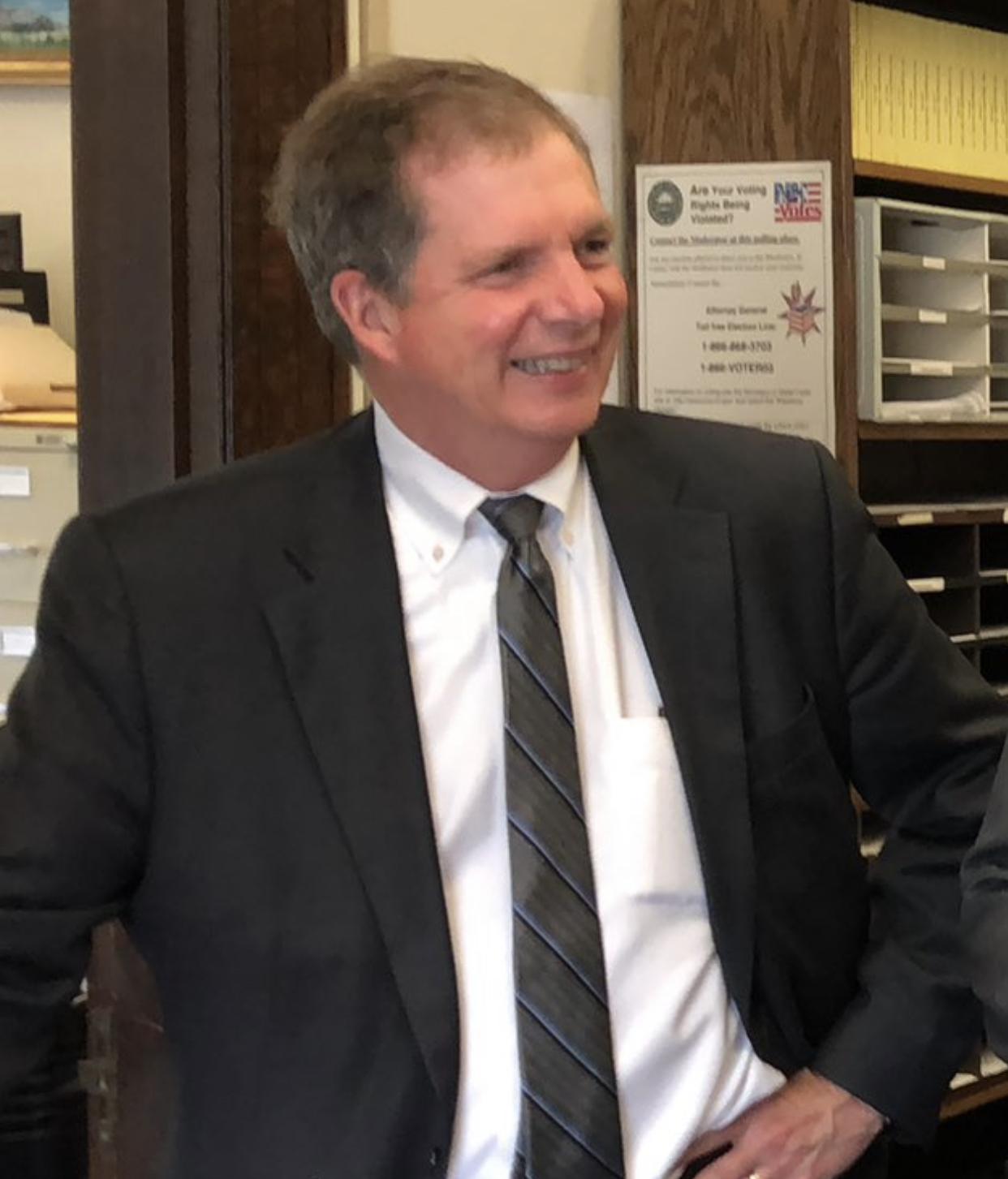

Secretary of State of New Hampshire
- Incumbent
- Assumed office January 10, 2022; Acting: January 10, 2022 – December 7, 2022
- Governor: Chris Sununu; Kelly Ayotte
- Preceded by: Bill Gardner

Majority Leader of the New Hampshire House of Representatives
- In office December 6, 2000 – December 4, 2002
- Preceded by: Gene Chandler
- Succeeded by: David Hess

Member of the New Hampshire House of Representatives from the Grafton 11th district
- In office December 5, 1984 – December 4, 2002
- Preceded by: Craig A. Downing
- Succeeded by: Edmond Gionet; Gregory Sorg

Personal details
- Born: June 14, 1956 (age 70) Bellefonte, Pennsylvania, U.S.
- Party: Republican
- Education: West Virginia University (BS)

David M. Scanlan (born June 14, 1956) is an American politician and election official serving as the 54th secretary of state of New Hampshire. A Republican, he assumed office as acting secretary of state upon the resignation of Bill Gardner on January 10, 2022. He was elected to a new two-year term as secretary of state by the New Hampshire General Court (state legislature) on December 7, 2022. He previously served as deputy secretary of state, since 2002 and served in the New Hampshire House of Representatives from 1984 to 2002, becoming majority leader.

== Early life and career ==
Scanlan was born in Bellefonte, Pennsylvania. Prior to entering politics, he worked as a forester. On January 3, 2022, the New Hampshire Secretary of State Bill Gardner announced his retirement as Secretary of State prior to the end of his term. Scanlan succeeded him on an acting basis to serve the remainder of Gardner's term. Scanlan was elected to a new two-year term in a joint legislative session on December 7, 2022.

New Hampshire House of Representatives
Preceded by Gene Chandler	Majority Leader of the New Hampshire House of Representatives; 2000–2002	Succeeded by David Hess
Political offices
Preceded by Bill Gardner	Secretary of State of New Hampshire; 2022–present	Incumbent
