= Secretary of Economic Development and Commerce of Puerto Rico =

Government of Puerto Rico

- Incumbent; Sebastián Negrón Reichard
- Department of Economic Development and Commerce
- Nominator: Governor
- Appointer: Governor with advice and consent from the Senate
- Term length: 4 years
- Formation: Established by Reorganization Plan No. 4
- Succession: Seventh
- Salary: US$80,000
- Website: ddec.pr.gov

The Secretary of Economic Development and Commerce of Puerto Rico heads the Puerto Rico Department of Economic Development and Commerce and is the chief economist of the government of Puerto Rico. The Secretary is responsible for the economic development of Puerto Rico and all its commerce related matters.

As of 2025, the Secretary is Sebastián Negrón Reichard, who took office in January of that year. He holds degrees from the Wharton School of the University of Pennsylvania (B.S. in Economics and B.A. in International Studies), as well as a J.D. and M.B.A. from Harvard Law School and Harvard Business School. His administration has focused on updating economic procedures, encouraging foreign investment, and promoting Puerto Rico as a center for manufacturing and advanced industries.
