= List of works by Joseph Blackburn =

Joseph Blackburn was an English portrait painter who worked mainly in Bermuda and colonial America.

== Artworks ==
Year	Title	Image	Dimensions	Collection	Comments
1750	Portrait of Mrs. Susannah Ulrich (?) (c. 1750), oil		43 1/2 × 33 in. (110.5 × 83.8 cm.)		Subject: thought to be Mrs. Susannah Ulrich. IAP 80970141
1752	Portrait of General Francis Jones (c. 1752), oil		50 × 40 in. (~127 × ~101.6 cm.)		Subject: lived 1698–1776; Commander-In-Chief and Vice-Admiral of Bermuda Islands. IAP 71930563, IAP 80045392, and IAP 80970099
1752	Portrait of Anne Jones, oil on canvas	view	30 1/2 × 25 in. (~77.6 × ~65 cm.)		Subject: lived 1748–1811. IAP 62642069, IAP 71930567 and IAP 80970098
1752	Portrait of Captain John Pigott (c. 1752–1753), oil on canvas		50 × 40 in. (127 × 101.6 cm.)	Los Angeles County Museum of Art, Los Angeles, California	Subject: husband of Frances (Fanny) Jones. IAP 71930564, IAP 80970102, and possibly IAP 80970103
1752	Portrait of Mrs. John Pigott (c. 1752–1753), oil on canvas		50 × 40 in. (127 × 101.6 cm.)	Los Angeles County Museum of Art, Los Angeles, California	Subject: Frances (Fanny) Jones. IAP 71930565
1752	Portrait of Miss Gilbert (c. 1752–1753), oil		35 × 27 1/2 in. (88.9 × 69.9 cm.)		IAP 80970093
1752	Portrait of Mr. Gilbert (c. 1752–1753), oil		31 × 24 in. (78.7 × 61.0 cm.)		IAP 80970094
1752	Portrait of Mrs. Gilbert (c. 1752–1753), oil		31 × 26 in. (78.7 × 66.0 cm.)		IAP 80970095
1752	Portrait of Mrs. Fisher (c. 1752–1753), oil		36 1/2 × 28 3/4 in. (92.7 × 73.0 cm.)		IAP 80970092
1752	Portrait of Mrs. John Harvey (c. 1752), oil on canvas	view	40 3/8 × 33 3/8 in. (102.5 × 84.7 cm.)	University of Arizona Museum of Art, Tucson, Arizona	Subject: Esther Jones. IAP 62642068, IAP 71930566, and IAP 01350036
1752	Portrait of Mrs. Henry Corbusier (c. 1752–1753), oil		47 × 38 in. (119.4 × 96.5 cm.)		Subject: Elizabeth Butterfield. IAP 80970091
1752	Portrait of Nathaniel Butterfield (c. 1752–1753), oil		29 1/2 × 24 1/2 in. (74.9 × 62.2 cm.)		Subject: General Nathaniel Butterfield (1694–1765). IAP 80970090
1752	Portrait of Mrs. Thomas Jones, oil		49 × 39 in. (124.5 × 99.1 cm.)		Subject: Mary Harvey (1729–1747). IAP 80045391 and IAP 80970100
1752	Portrait of Thomas Parsons (c. 1752–1753), oil		29 × 24 in. (73.7 × 61.0 cm.)		IAP 80970101
1752	Portrait of Thomas Tudor Tucker (c. 1752–1753), oil		19 1/2 × 12 3/4 in. oval (49.5 × 32.4 cm. oval)		Subject: Thomas Tudor Tucker (1745–1828); Bermuda-born American physician and politician representing Charleston, South Carolina; served as Treasurer of the United States (1801–28). IAP 80970105
1752	Portrait of William Hall (c. 1752–1753), oil		36 × 28 in. (91.4 × 71.1 cm.)		Subject: husband of Patience Stowe. IAP 80970096
1752	Portrait of Mrs. William Hall (c. 1752–1753), oil		36 × 28 in. (91.4 × 71.1 cm.)		Subject: Patience Stowe. IAP 80970097
1752	Portrait said to be of Sir William Phips (c. 1752–1760), oil		56 × 40 in. (142.2 × 101.6 cm.)		IAP 80970115
1753	Portrait of Colonel Henry Tucker (c. 1753), oil				Subject: Col. Henry Tucker (1713–1787). IAP 80960072
1753	Portrait of Mrs. Henry Tucker and Her Children, Elizabeth and Nathaniel, oil				Subjects: Anne Butterfield (1722–1797); wife of Colonel Henry Tucker (1713–1787); Elizabeth Tucker (1747–1830); Nathaniel Tucker (1750–1807). IAP 80960071
1753	Portrait of Gurdon Saltonstall (c. 1753–1763), oil on canvas	view	30 × 25 in. (76.2 × 63.5 cm.)	Lyman Allyn Art Museum, New London, Connecticut	Subject: Brigadier General Gurdon Saltonstall (1708–1785); son of colonial Connecticut Governor Gurdon Saltonstall (1666–1724) and Elizabeth Rosewell (1679–1710); husband of Rebecca Winthrop (1711–1776). IAP 07300020
1753	Portrait of Miss Deborah Bascombe, oil		34 × 27 1/2 in. (86.4 × 69.9 cm.)		Subject: lived 1715-after 1756. IAP 80970089
1753	Portrait of Mrs. John Harvey (c. 1753), oil		36 × 28 in. (91.4 × 71.1 cm.)	Bermuda National Gallery, Hamilton, Bermuda	Subject: Mary Lea. IAP 8A720010
1754	Portrait of Elizabeth Pelham Harrison		-	Redwood Library and Atheneum, Newport, Rhode Island	-
1754	Portrait of Mrs. Alexander Grant, oil on canvas		50 × 40 in. (127.0 × 101.6 cm.)	Art Institute of Chicago, Chicago, Illinois	Subject: Abigail Chesebrough (1734–1807); daughter of David Chesebrough (1702–1782, eminent merchant in Newport) and Abigail Rogers (1706–1738); wife of Alexander Grant (1730–1783); stepdaughter of Mrs. Margaret (Sylvester) Chesebrough (1719–1782). IAP 80970110, IAP 60630138, IAP 70580108, and IAP 12000314
1754	Portrait of Captain John Brown (c. 1754), oil on canvas		51 × 41 in. (129.5 × 104.1 cm.)	Nightingale-Brown House, Brown University, Providence, Rhode Island	Subject: Newport merchant (1696–1764); husband of Jane Lucas (1697–1775; m. 1717). IAP 80960019
1754	Portrait of Mrs. John Brown (c. 1754), oil on canvas		50 × 40 in. (127.0 × 101.6 cm.)	Nightingale-Brown House, Brown University, Providence, Rhode Island	Subject: Jane Lucas (1697–1775); wife of Captain John Brown (1696–1764; m. 1717; Newport merchant). IAP 80960020
1754	Portrait of George Jaffrey (c. 1754), oil		30 × 25 in. (76.2 × 63.5 cm.)	Albrecht-Kemper Museum of Art, St. Joseph, Missouri	Subject: lived 1717–1803; husband of Lucy Winthrop (1721–1776). IAP 71481248 and IAP 80044318
1754	Portrait of Mrs. George Jaffrey (c. 1754), oil		30 × 25 in. (76.2 × 63.5 cm.)	Albrecht-Kemper Museum of Art, St. Joseph, Missouri	Subject: Lucy Winthrop (1721–1776); wife of George Jaffery (1717–1803). IAP 71481249 and IAP 80044319
1754	Portrait of Mary Sylvester, oil on canvas, a pastoral portrait		49 7/8 × 40 1/4 in. (126.7 × 102.1 cm.)	Metropolitan Museum of Art, New York City	Subject: lived 1725–1794 (b. Southold, Long Island); daughter of Brinley Sylvester (1690–1752) and Mary Burroughs (1702–1751); sister of Margaret (later Mrs. David Chesebrough) (1719–1782); later wife of Thomas Dering (1720–1785). IAP 36120012
1754	Portrait of Mrs. David Chesebrough, oil on canvas		49 7/8 × 40 1/8 in. (126.7 × 101.9 cm.)	Metropolitan Museum of Art, New York City	Subject: Margaret Sylvester (1719–1782); daughter of Brinley Sylvester (1690–1752) and Mary Burroughs (1702–1751); sister of Mary Sylvester (1725–1794); wife of David Chesebrough (1703–1782, eminent merchant in Newport); stepmother of Abigail Chesebrough (1734–1807). IAP 36120011
1754	Portrait of Thomas Cranston (c. 1754–1755), oil	view	48 1/2 × 39 in. (123.2 × 99.1 cm.)	John Brown House Museum, Rhode Island Historical Society, Providence, Rhode Island	Subject: lived 1710–1785. IAP 47510054
1755	Portrait of Andrew Faneuil Phillips, oil on canvas		50 3/8 × 40 1/4 in. (127.9 × 102.2 cm.)	Smith College Museum of Art, Smith College, Northampton, Massachusetts	Subject: lived 1729–1775; son of Gillam Phillips (1695–1770) and Mary Faneuil (1708–1780). IAP 22280220 and IAP 80960052
1755	Portrait of Andrew Oliver Jr., oil on canvas	view	50 × 40 in. (127.0 × 101.6 cm.)		Subject: lived 1731–1799; son of Massachusetts lieutenant governor Andrew Oliver (1706–1774); husband of Mary Lynde (1733–1807; m. 1752); elected to American Philosophical Society in 1773. IAP 80960047
1755	Portrait of Mrs. Andrew Oliver Jr., oil on canvas	view	50 × 40 in. (127.0 × 101.6 cm.)		Subject: Mary Lynde (1733–1807); wife of Andrew Oliver (1731–1799; m. 1752). IAP 80960048
1755	Portrait of Colonel Benjamin Pollard (c. 1755), oil on canvas		33 1/2 × 25 1/2 in. (85.1 × 64.8 cm.)	(sometimes listed as copy after John Smibert's original of 1730)	Subject: lived 1696–1756; husband of Margaret Winslow (1724–1814); served as fourth sergeant Ancient and Honorable Artillery Company of Massachusetts (beginning in 1726); served as sheriff of Suffolk County (c. 1743 – 1756). IAP 61510786, IAP 80960058, and IAP 82110603
1755	Portrait of Chambers Russell (c. 1755), oil				Subject: lived 1713–1767. IAP 80960060
1755	Portrait of Mrs. Chambers Russell (c. 1755), oil		48 1/2 × 36 1/2 in. (123.2 × 92.7 cm.)		Subject: lived 1716–1762; wife of Chambers Russell (1713–1767). IAP 80960061 and possibly IAP 20440078
1755	Portrait of Gillam Phillips, oil on canvas		50 × 40 in. (127.0 × 101.6 cm.)	Smith College Museum of Art, Smith College, Northampton, Massachusetts	Subject: lived 1695–1770; husband of Mary Faneuil (1708–1780); father of Andrew Faneuil Phillips (1729–1775) and Ann Faneuil Phillips (1736- c. 1770). IAP 80960053
1755	Portrait of Mrs. Gillam Phillips, oil on canvas		50 × 40 in. (127.0 × 101.6 cm.)	Smith College Museum of Art, Smith College, Northampton, Massachusetts	Subject: Marie Faneuil (1708–1780); wife of Gillam Phillips (1695–1770); mother of Andrew Faneuil Phillips (1729–1775) and Ann Faneuil Phillips (1736- c. 1770). IAP 80960054
1755	Portrait of Isaac Winslow and His Family, oil on canvas, one of the earliest group portraits painted in Colonial America		54 1/2 × 79 1/4 in. (138.4 × 201.3 cm.)	Museum of Fine Arts, Boston, Massachusetts	Subjects: Isaac Winslow (1707–1777; one of Boston’s mercantile elite); his wife, Lucy Waldo (1724–1768; m. 1747); elder daughter, Lucy Winslow (1749–1770); child in mother's lap, Hannah Winslow (1755–1819). Setting: Scenery of idealized garden with swan pond behind elder daughter alludes to family’s prosperity. IAP 85520007 and IAP 82110940
1755	Portrait of James Otis, Jr., oil		28 5/8 × 23 1/2 in. (72.7 × 59.7 cm.) [also reported as 29 1/2 × 25 1/2 in. (74.9 × 64.8 cm.)]		Subject: James Otis Jr. (1725–1783); lawyer in colonial Massachusetts; son of James Otis Sr., (1702–1778); prominent lawyer in colonial Massachusetts) and Mary Allyne; husband of Ruth Cunningham (1728–1789; daughter of prominent Boston merchant; m. 1755); father of three children (James, Elizabeth, and Mary). IAP 81880451 and IAP 80960049
1755	Portrait of Mrs. James Otis (c. 1755), oil		28 7/8 × 23 1/2 in. (73.4 × 59.7 cm.)		Subject: Ruth Cunningham (1728–1789); daughter of prominenet Boston merchant; wife of James Otis Jr. (1725–1783; lawyer in colonial Massachusetts; m. 1755); mother of three children (James, Elizabeth, and Mary). IAP 80960050
1755	Portrait of John Erving, Jr., oil	view	49 1/4 × 39 1/4 in. (125.1 × 99.7 cm.)	Wadsworth Atheneum, Hartford, Connecticut	Subject: lived 1728–1816; husband of Maria Catherine Shirley (1729–1816). IAP 80960032
1755	Portrait of Mrs. John Erving, Jr., oil	view	49 × 38 7/8 in. (124.5 × 98.7 cm.)	Wadsworth Atheneum, Hartford, Connecticut	Subject: Maria Catherine Shirley (1729–1816); youngest daughter of William Shirley (1694–1771; colonial governor of Province of Massachusetts Bay, 1741–49 and 1753–56; Governor of the Bahamas in the 1760s) and Frances Barker (died 1746; Lady Frances Shirley); wife of John Erving Jr. (1728–1816). IAP 80960033
1755	Portrait of Miss Ann Phillips, oil on canvas		50 × 40 in. (127.0 × 101.6 cm.)	Smith College Museum of Art, Smith College, Northampton, Massachusetts	Subject: Ann Faneuil Phillips (1736- c. 1770); daughter of Gillam Phillips (1695–1770) and Mary Faneuil (1708–1780). IAP 80960051
1755	Portrait of Mrs. Epes Sargent (c. 1775), oil		50 × 40 in. (127.0 × 101.6 cm.)		Subject: Catharine Winthrop/Katherine Winthrop Browne (1711–1781). IAP 80970116
1755	Portrait of Mrs. George Bethune, oil on cavas		50 × 40 1/4 in. (127.0 × 102.2 cm.)	Museum of Fine Arts, Springfield	Subject: Mary Faneuil (1734–1797); daughter of Benjamin Faneuil (one of first paper manufacturers in Massachusetts); niece of Peter Faneuil (provided funds for Boston's public market and meeting house); wife of George Bethune (m. 1754, Boston); mother of George, Susan (Mrs. Edmond Dunkin), Penelope (Mrs. English), Jane (Mrs. William Hunt), and Ann (Mrs. Lovell). IAP 22930027
1755	Portrait of Mrs. Louis Boucher (c. 1755), oil		50 × 40 in. (127.0 × 101.6 cm.)		Subject: Sarah Middlecott. IAP 80970109
1755	Portrait of Mrs. Samuel Curwen, oil		29 × 24 in. (73.7 × 61.0 cm.)		Subject: Abigail Russell (1725–1793); wife of Samuel Curwen (1715–1802; m. 1750). IAP 80960027
1755	Portrait of Mrs. Thomas Flucker (c. 1755), oil on canvas	view	50 1/4 × 40 1/8 in. (127.6 × 101.9 cm.)	Bowdoin College Museum of Art, Brunswick, Maine	Subject: Hannah Waldo (1726–1785); wife of Thomas Flucker (1719–1783; m. 1750); sister of Lucy Waldo (1724–1768). IAP 17860012
1755	Portrait of Reverend Daniel Greenleaf, oil on canvas	view	29 7/8 × 25 1/4 in. (75.9 × 64.1 cm.)	Harvard Art Museums, Harvard University, Cambridge, Massachusetts	Subject: also known as Dr. Daniel Greenleaf (1679–1763); father of William Greenleaf (1725–1803). IAP 80970113 and IAP 82110320
1756	Portrait of a Military Officer, oil on canvas	view	30 1/2 × 25 1/8 in. (77.5 × 63.6 cm.)	National Gallery of Art, Washington, D.C.	Subject: unidentified officer in the Massachusetts Provincial Forces (once thought to be General Joshua Winslow). IAP 08600023
1756	Portrait of Benjamin Ellery III (c. 1756), oil on canvas		30 × 26 in. (76.2 × 66.0 cm.) [also listed as 24 1/2 × 29 1/2 in. (62.2 × 74.9 cm.)]	Newport Historical Society, Newport, Rhode Island	Subject: lived 1725–1799; son of William Ellery (1727–1820; signed United States Declaration of Independence as representative of Rhode Island). IAP 47330007, IAP 80970112, IAP 83190005 and IAP 81670011
1756	Portrait of Benjamin Green, oil on canvas		50 × 40 in. (127.0 × 101.6 cm.)	Montclair Art Museum, Montclair, New Jersey	Subject: Benjamin Green (1713–1772; merchant in Boston, Massachusetts; later merchant, judge, and political figure in Nova Scotia); son of Reverend Joseph Green and Elizabeth Gerrish; husband of Margaret Pierce (m. 1737). IAP 31620235
1756	Portrait of Colonel Henry Babcock, oil		49 3/4 × 39 3/4 in. (126.4 × 101.0 cm.)		Subject: Henry "Harry" Babcock (1736–1800). IAP 80960010
1756	Portrait of Elizabeth Naden, oil on canvas	view	30 × 25 in. (76.2 × 63.5 cm.)	New-York Historical Society, New York City	Subject: lived c. 1739 – 1808; daughter of Martha Naden Mortier; stepdaughter of Major Abraham Mortier; wife of John Appy (secretary to general and judge advocate of British Army in North America; m. 1757); later wife of Goldbrow Banyar Sr. (m. 1767). IAP 36360936
1756	Portrait of General Joseph Dwight, oil		49 × 38 in. (124.5 × 96.5 cm.)	Historical Society of Old Newbury, Newbury, Massachusetts	Subject: lived 1703–1765. IAP 80190023, IAP 80960031, and IAP 82110247
1756	Portrait of Margaret Pierce Green, oil on canvas		50 × 40 in. (127.25 × 101.6 cm.)	Montclair Art Museum, Montclair, New Jersey	Subject: wife of Benjamin Green (1713–1772; merchant in Boston, Massachusetts and Nova Scotia; m. 1737). IAP 31620032
1756	Portrait of Joshua Winslow (c. 1756), oil	view	30 × 25 in. (76.2 × 63.5 cm.)	Yale University Art Gallery, New Haven, Connecticut	Subject: lived 1694–1769. IAP 07260854 and IAP 20480273
1756	Portrait of Lieutenant Joshua Winslow, II, oil		30 1/2 × 25 in. (77.5 × 63.5 cm.)		Subject: lived 1726/27–1801. IAP 80970126
1756	Portrait of Mrs. Benjamin Pollard, oil on canvas		33 1/2 × 25 1/2 in. (85.1 × 64.8 cm.)	Yale University Art Gallery, New Haven, Connecticut	Subject: Margaret Winslow (1724–1814); wife of Benjamin Pollard (1696–1756). IAP 07260853
1756	Portrait of Mrs. John Greenleaf, oil		35 1/8 × 28 1/4 in. (89.2 × 71.8 cm.)		Subject: lived 1725-c. 1760. IAP 80960039
1756	Portrait of Mrs. John Tasker, oil		34 1/4 × 28 in. (87.0 × 71.1 cm.)		Subject: Deborah Skinner (1702–1768); wife of Judge John Tasker (Marblehead, Massachusetts). IAP 80970117
1756	Portrait of Nathaniel Cunningham (c. 1756), oil on canvas	view	48 1/2 × 39 in. (123.2 × 99.1 cm.)		Subject: Captain Nathaniel Cunningham Jr. (1725–1756); son of prominent Boston merchant; husband of Sarah Kilby (m. 1754); father of two daughters; buried in the Granary Burying Ground, Boston, Massachusetts. IAP 83340044
1756	Portrait of Mrs. Nathaniel Cunningham (c. 1756), oil on canvas		50 × 39 1/2 in. (127 × 100.3 cm.)	Colby College Museum of Art, Waterville, Maine	Subject: Sarah Kilby; wife of Nathaniel Cunningham Jr. (1725–1756; m. 1754); mother of two daughters. (probably IAP 18830150)
1756	Portrait of Rev. Peter Bours, oil	view	50 × 40 1/4 in. (127.0 × 102.2 cm.) [also listed as 53 7/16 × 43 3/8 in. (135.7 × 110.2 cm.); 29 1/4 × 24 1/2 in. (74.3 × 62.2 cm.)]	Harvard Art Museums, Harvard University, Cambridge, Massachusetts	Subject: lived 1726–1762. IAP 20780030 and IAP 27710034
1756	Portrait said to be of Woodbury Osborne, oil	view	30 × 25 in. (76.2 × 63.5 cm.)		IAP 61501605 and IAP 80970114
1757	Portrait of Edward Winslow, oil		29 3/4 × 24 3/4 in. (75.6 × 62.9 cm.)		Subject: lived 1669–1753. IAP 80970124
1757	Portrait of Hon. William Greenleaf, oil	view	50 1/2 × 40 in. (128.3 × 101.6 cm.)	Portland Art Museum	Subject: lived 1725–1803; son of Daniel Greenleaf (1679–1763); husband of Mary Brown (1728–1807). IAP 80960040
1757	Portrait of Mrs. William Greenleaf, oil	view	50 5/16 × 40 1/16 in. (127.8 × 101.8 cm.)	Portland Art Museum	Subject: Mary Brown (1728–1807); wife of Hon. William Greenleaf (1725–1803). IAP 80960041
1757	Portrait of James Pitts, oil on canvas	view	50 1/8 × 40 in. (127.3 × 101.6 cm.)	Detroit Institute of Arts, Detroit, Michigan	Subject: lived 1710–1776; husband of Elizabeth Bowdoin (1716–1771). Museum lists artist as Joseph Jonathan Blackburn. IAP 24150071
1757	Portrait of Mrs. James Pitts, oil on canvas	view	50 1/8 × 40 in. (127.3 × 101.6 cm.)	Detroit Institute of Arts, Detroit, Michigan	Subject: Elizabeth Bowdoin (1716–1771); wife of James Pitts (1710–1776). Museum lists artist as Joseph Jonathan Blackburn. IAP 24150072
1757	Portrait of Mrs. John Taylor, oil		29 1/4 × 24 1/4 in. (74.3 × 61.6 cm.)		Subject: Ann Winslow (1678–1773). IAP 80970118
1757	Portrait of Mrs. Joseph Blaney (c. 1757), oil on canvas		49 1/2 × 39 1/2 in. (125.7 × 100.3 cm.)	Museum of Fine Arts, Boston, Massachusetts	Subject: Abigail Browne. IAP 20490160 (SIRIS lists as attributed to Joseph Blackburn.)
1757	Portrait of Mrs. Nathaniel Dowse (c. 1757), oil on canvas		49 3/8 × 39 3/8 in. (125.4 × 100.0 cm.)		Subject: Margaret Temple (1724–1771). IAP 80960030 and IAP 82110233
1757	Portrait of Mrs. William Taylor, oil		28 1/4 × 24 1/2 in. (71.8 × 62.2 cm.)		Subject: Faith Winslow (b. 1712); daughter of Kenelm Winslow (1675–1757) and Abigail Waterman (1681–1729) of Marshfield, Massachusetts. IAP 80970119
1757	Portrait of Thomas Bulfinch (c. 1756), oil on canvas		30 × 26 in. (76.2 × 66.0 cm.)	Museum of Fine Arts, Boston, Massachusetts	Subject: prominent Boston physician; husband of Susan Apthorp (1734–1815; m. 1759). IAP 20490154
1757	Portrait of Mrs. Thomas Bulfinch, oil on canvas		50 × 40 in. (127.0 × 101.6 cm.)	Museum of Fine Arts, Boston, Massachusetts	Subject: Susan Apthorp (1734–1815); daughter of Charles Apthorp (British-born Boston merchant); wife of Thomas Bulfinch (prominent Boston physician; m. 1759). IAP 70080964 and IAP 20490155
1758	Mother and Child (c. 1758), oil		51 × 40 in. (129.5 × 101.6 cm.)		IAP 80041712
1758	Portrait of Charles Apthorp, oil		50 × 40 in. (127.0 × 101.6 cm.)		Subject: Charles Apthorp (1698–1758; British-born Boston merchant). IAP 80960003
1758	Portrait of Mrs. Charles Apthorp, oil		49 × 39 in. (124.5 × 99.1 cm.)		Subject: Grisselda "Grizzel" Eastwick (c. 1709 – 1796); wife of Charles Apthorp (1698–1758; British-born Boston merchant). IAP 80960004
1758	Portrait of Deacon Jonathan Simpson (c. 1758), oil		50 × 40 in. (127.0 × 101.6 cm.)	Museum of Fine Arts, Boston, Massachusetts	Subject: lived 1685–1763. IAP 22930028 and IAP 20490156
1758	Portrait of Jonathan Simpson, oil on canvas	view	49 1/2 × 39 1/2 in. (125.7 × 100.3 cm.)	Hood Museum of Art, Dartmouth College, Hanover, New Hampshire	Subject: lived c. 1712 – 1795. IAP 80960065
1758	Portrait of Mrs. Jonathan Simpson (c. 1758), oil on canvas	view B&W	50 3/4 × 40 1/4 in. (128.9 × 102.2 cm.)	Museum of Fine Arts, Boston, Massachusetts	Subject: Margaret Lechmere. IAP 20490157
1758	Portrait of Lieutenant General Jeffery Amherst, oil on canvas		31 1/2 × 26 1/16 in. (80.0 × 66.2 cm.)	Mead Art Museum, Amherst College, Amherst, Massachusetts	Subject: lived 1717–1779. IAP 80960001 and IAP 20090478
1758	Portrait of Mrs. George St. Loe, oil		30 × 25 in. (76.2 × 63.5 cm.)		Subject: Anne Browne (b. 1738). IAP 61512159, IAP 80960062, and IAP 38320244 (Munson-Williams-Proctor Arts Institute, Utica, New York)
1758	Portrait of Mrs. Richard Waldron (c. 1758), oil		49 × 39 in. (124.5 × 99.1 cm.)		Subject: Elizabeth Westbrook (1701–1758). IAP 81840242
1758	Portrait of Mrs. Samuel Gardner, oil		35 4/8 × 27 1/4 in. (90.2 × 69.2 cm.)		Subject: lived 1716–1789. IAP 80960038
1758	Portrait of Mrs. Wyseman Clagett (c. 1758–1762), oil on canvas		36 1/16 × 27 3/4 in. (91.6 × 70.5 cm.)	Brooklyn Museum, New York City	Subject: Lettice Mitchell; and later Mrs. Simon McQuesten. IAP 35680049
1759	Portrait of Hannah Babcock, oil on canvas	view	[likely 50 3/32 × 40 1/8 in. (127.2 × 101.9 cm.)]	Worcester Art Museum, Worcester, Massachusetts	Subject: lived 1743–1796 (16 at time of portrait; later bore 11 children [5 died in childhood; 4 died in infancy]; daughter of Dr. Joshua Babcock (1707–1783; physician, businessman, plantation owner, and postmaster in Westerly, Rhode Island; politician and Chief Justice of the Supreme Court in colonial Rhode Island; major general of Rhode Island militia) and Hannah Stanton Babcock (1714/7–1778); later wife of John Bours (1734–1815; m. July 7, 1762; merchant in Newport). (possibly IAP 23570197, date listed as 1761)
1760	Portrait of a Gentleman (c. 1760), oil on canvas	view	50 1/16 × 40 1/8 in. (127.2 × 101.9 cm.) [also reported as 56 × 40 in. (142.2 × 101.6 cm.)]	Corcoran Gallery of Art, Washington, D.C.	(possibly IAP 62441070 and IAP 08260832)
1760	Portrait of a Lady, oil		50 × 40 1/2 in. (127.0 × 102.9 cm.)	Yale University Art Gallery, New Haven, Connecticut	IAP 61505283, IAP 71930306, IAP 80043349, IAP 62440046, and IAP 62441068 (possibly IAP 07262074 [reported as 59.5 × 44 cm.])
1760	Portrait of Colonel Theodore Atkinson, oil on canvas	view	50 × 40 1/4 in. (127.0 × 102.2 cm.) [also reported as 47 1/2 × 39 1/4 in. (120.7 × 99.7 cm.)]	Worcester Art Museum, Worcester, Massachusetts	Subject: Theodore Atkinson; lived 1697–1779; husband of Hannah Wentworth (1700–1769); colonial chief justice of New Hampshire Superior Court. IAP 80970127 and IAP 23570023
1760	Portrait of Mrs. Theodore Atkinson, oil on canvas	view	49 1/8 × 39 1/8 in. (124.8 × 99.4 cm.)	Worcester Art Museum, Worcester, Massachusetts (listed in collection of Cleveland Museum of Art, Cleveland, Ohio)	Subject: Hannah Wentworth (1700–1769); sister of first royal governor of New Hampshire; wife of Colonel Theodore Atkinson (colonial chief justice of New Hampshire Superior Court). IAP 41000005
1760	Portrait of Theodore Atkinson, Jr., oil		49 5/8 × 39 5/8 in. (126.1 × 100.7 cm.)	Rhode Island School of Design, Providence, Rhode Island	Subject: lived 1736–1769. IAP 80960008
1760	Portrait of Colonel William Taylor, oil on canvas	view	30 × 25 in. (76.2 × 63.5 cm.)		Subject: prominent Boston merchant (1714–1789); husband of Sarah Cheever (m. 1765); captain of Artillery Company (elected 1760); died in Milton, Massachusetts. IAP 80960069
1760	Portrait of Daniel Henchman (c. 1760), oil		50 × 40 in. (127.0 × 101.6 cm.)		Subject: lived 1689–1761. IAP 80960042
1760	Portrait of Mrs. Daniel Henchman (c. 1760), oil		50 × 40 in. (127.0 × 101.6 cm.)		Subject: lived 1693–1767. IAP 80960043
1760	Portrait of David Mumford (c. 1760), oil on canvas	view	49 × 39 in. (124.5 × 99.1 cm.)		Subject: lived 1731–1807. IAP 73260397 and IAP 73262537
1760	Portrait of Mr. & Mrs. Bowdoin, oil		37 × 58 in. (94.0 × 147.3 cm.)		Subjects: said to be James Bowdoin [Jr.] and is wife, Elizabeth. IAP 81590015
1760	Portrait of Elizabeth Bowdoin and James Bowdoin III (c. 1760), oil on canvas	view	36 7/8 × 58 in. (93.7 × 147.4 cm.)	Bowdoin College Museum of Art, Brunswick, Maine	Subjects: James Bowdoin III (1752–1811) and his sister, Elizabeth (1750–1809; later Lady Temple, wife of John Temple [1731–1798; first British consul-general to United States]). IAP 17860011
1760	Portrait of General John Winslow (c. 1760), oil		29 3/4 × 25 3/4 in. (75.6 × 65.4 cm.)	Pilgrim Hall Museum, Pilgrim Society, Plymouth, Massachusetts	Subject: General John Winslow (c. 1702 – 1774). IAP 80960087, IAP 82110943, and IAP 22430002
1760	Portrait of Governor Benning Wentworth, oil on canvas		92 × 56 1/4 in. (233.7 × 142.9 cm.) [also reported as 92 × 57 1/4 in. (233.7 × 145.4 cm.)]	New Hampshire Historical Society Museum, Concord, New Hampshire	Subject: Benning Wentworth (1696–1770); governor of Province of New Hampshire (1741–66). IAP 80960083, IAP 83030251, and IAP 30490011
1760	Portrait of Lieutenant Governor Thomas Oliver, pastel		22 × 18 in. (55.9 × 45.7 cm.)	Museum of Fine Arts, Boston, Massachusetts	Subject: lived 1734–1815; served as last Royal Lieutenant-Governor of Province of Massachusetts Bay (1774–76). IAP 80970138
1760	Portrait of Marchioness of Wentworth (c. 1760–1767), oil on canvas	view	36 × 28 in. (91.4 × 71.1 cm.)	Minneapolis Institute of Arts, Minneapolis, Minnesota	IAP 80970123
1760	Portrait of John Browne (c. 1760), oil on canvas	view	48 1/2 × 39 in. (123.2 × 99.1 cm.)	Cleveland Museum of Art, Cleveland, Ohio	Subject: lived 1735–1789. IAP 80960022
1760	Portrait of Lieutenant-Governor John Wentworth, oil on canvas		92 × 57 1/4 in. (233.7 × 145.4 cm.)	New Hampshire Historical Society Museum, Concord, New Hampshire	Subject: John Wentworth (1671–1730); served as Lieutenant Governor of Province of New Hampshire (1717–30). IAP 70880028, IAP 80960084, and IAP 83030255
1760	Portrait of Mrs. George Scott (c. 1760), oil	view	50 × 40 in. (127.0 × 101.6 cm.)	Bayou Bend Collection and Gardens, Houston, Texas	Subject: Abigail Erving Scott (1733–1768). Wife of the Hon Major George Scott. IAP 80960063
1760	Portrait of Sir Francis Bernard, oil		49 × 39 1/4 in. (124.5 × 99.7 cm.)	Wadsworth Atheneum, Hartford, Connecticut	Subject: Sir Francis Bernard, 1st Baronet (1711/12–1779). IAP 06910012
1760	Portrait of Lady Amelia Bernard (c. 1760)		50 × 40 in. (127.0 × 101.6 cm.)	Wadsworth Atheneum, Hartford, Connecticut	Subject: Amelia Offley, wife of Sir Francis Bernard, 1st Baronet (m. 1741). IAP 06910001
1760	Portrait of Lieutenant Governor Thomas Hutchinson, oil		21 1/2 × 18 in. (54.6 × 45.7 cm.)	Museum of Fine Arts, Boston, Massachusetts	Subject: Thomas Hutchinson (1711–1780). IAP 80970135
1760	Portrait of Major John Wentworth (c. 1760), oil on canvas		48 3/4 × 39 1/2 in. (123.8 × 100.3 cm.) [also reported as 55 × 46 1/4 in. (139.7 × 116.8 cm.)]	New Hampshire Historical Society Museum, Concord, New Hampshire	Subject: lived c. 1720–1759. IAP 70880026, IAP 80960085 and IAP 83030258
1760	Portrait of Thomas Amory, oil		30 × 25 in. (76.2 × 63.5 cm.)		Subject: lived 1722–1784. IAP 80960002
1760	Portrait of Thomas Westbrook Waldron (c. 1760), oil		49 × 39 in. (124.5 × 99.1 cm.)		Subject: Thomas Westbrook Waldron (1721–1785). IAP 80970122 and IAP 81840243
1760	Portrait of Timothy Fitch (c. 1760), oil on canvas		48 1/2 × 39 1/2 in. (123.2 × 100.3 cm.)	Peabody Essex Museum, Salem, Massachusetts	Subject: lived 1725–1790; husband of Eunice Fitch (1731–1799; m. 1760). IAP 22620084
1760	Portrait of Mrs. Timothy Fitch (c. 1760), oil on canvas		48 1/2 × 39 1/2 in. (123.2 × 100.3 cm.)	Peabody Essex Museum, Salem, Massachusetts	Subject: Eunice Brown (1731–1799); wife of Timothy Fitch (1725–1790; m. 1760). IAP 22620083
1762	Portrait of Tristram Dalton, oil		35 1/4 × 27 1/4 in. (89.5 × 69.2 cm.)		Subject: Tristram Dalton (1738–1817; American politician); Senator from Massachusetts (1789–1791). IAP 80970111 and IAP 82110202
1761	Portrait of Colonel Jonathan Warner, oil on canvas		50 × 40 in. (127.0 × 101.6 cm.)	Museum of Fine Arts, Boston, Massachusetts	Subject: wealthy New Hampshire merchant (1726–1814). Through his second wife, Mary MacPheadris Osborne, Warner acquired the Portsmouth mansion built by Mary’s father, Archibald MacPheadris, known today as the MacPheadris-Warner House (listed on the National Register of Historic Places in 1960). IAP 20490158
1761	Portrait of Mrs. Jonathan Warner, oil		49 × 39 in. (124.5 × 99.1 cm.)	Warner House, Portsmouth, New Hampshire	Subject: Mary MacPheadris Osborne; second wife of Colonel Jonathan Warner (1726–1814; wealthy New Hampshire merchant). IAP 31020005
1761	Portrait of Dr. Joshua Babcock (c. 1761), oil on canvas		45 × 36 3/4 in. (114.3 × 93.3 cm.)	Museum of Fine Arts, Boston, Massachusetts	Subject: Joshua Babcock (1707–1783; physician, businessman, plantation owner, and postmaster in Westerly, Rhode Island; politician and Chief Justice of the Supreme Court in colonial Rhode Island; major general of Rhode Island militia); husband of Hannah Stanton (1714/7–1778). IAP 20490159
1761	Portrait of Mrs. Joshua Babcock, oil on canvas		44 3/8 × 35 5/8 in. (112.7 × 90.5 cm.)		Subject: Hannah Stanton (1714/7–1778); wife of Dr. Joshua Babcock (1707–1783; physician, businessman, plantation owner, and postmaster in Westerly, Rhode Island; politician and Chief Justice of the Supreme Court in colonial Rhode Island; major general of Rhode Island militia). IAP 80960012 and IAP 20480305
1761	Portrait of Elizabeth Browne Rogers, oil on canvas		50 × 40 in. (127.0 × 101.6 cm.)	Reynolda House Museum of American Art, Winston-Salem, North Carolina	Subject: Elizabeth Browne (1741–1813); youngest daughter of Rev. Arthur Browne (1699–1773; Anglican rector of socially prominent Queen’s Chapel in Portsmouth, New Hampshire); wife of Robert Rogers (1731–1795; well-known French and Indian War hero of Rogers' Rangers fame; m. 1761); later wife of John Roche (sea captain, fur-trader). IAP 80960021 and IAP 40010032
1761	Portrait of Mrs. George Jaffrey (c. 1761), oil		50 × 40 in. (127.0 × 101.6 cm.)	Warner House, Portsmouth, New Hampshire	Subject: Sarah Wentworth (1702–1778); first husband was Archibald MacPheadris; second husband was George Jaffrey. IAP 80960044, IAP 83030115, and IAP 31020001
1761	Portrait of Mrs. Nathaniel Barrell, oil on canvas	view	50 × 40 1/2 in. (127.0 × 102.9 cm.)	Historic New England, Boston, Massachusetts	Subject: Sarah "Sally" Sayward (1738–1805); daughter of Jonathan Sayward (a merchant and civic leader in colonial York Harbor, Maine); wife of Nathaniel Barrell (a prosperous merchant). IAP 80960014
1761	Portrait of Nathaniel Warner, oil		49 × 39 in. (124.5 × 99.1 cm.)	Warner House, Portsmouth, New Hampshire	Subject: brother of Colonel Jonathan Warner. IAP 31020002
1761	Portrait of Polly Warner, oil	view	49 × 39 in. (124.5 × 99.1 cm.)	Warner House, Portsmouth, New Hampshire	Subject: Mary "Polly" Warner (1749–1770); only daughter of Jonathan Warner (1726–1814) and Mary Nelson (m. 1748); wife of Samuel Sherburne (m. 1760). IAP 31020004
1761	Portrait of Samuel Warner, oil		49 1/2 × 40 in. (125.7 × 101.6 cm.)	Warner House, Portsmouth, New Hampshire	Subject: brother of Colonel Jonathan Warner. IAP 31020003
1761	Portrait of Thomas Wentworth, oil on canvas,		50 1/2 × 40 1/2 in. (128.3 × 102.9 cm.)	San Diego Museum of Art, San Diego, California	Subject: lived 1740–1768. IAP 03940006
1762	Portrait of a Gentleman of the Nubbel Family, oil		30 1/2 × 24 1/2 in. (77.5 × 62.2 cm.)		IAP 83340185
1762	Portrait of a Woman (c. 1762), oil on canvas		44 × 36 1/4 in. (111.8 × 92.1 cm.) [also reported as 50 × 40 in. (127.0 × 101.6 cm.); 36 × 28 in. (91.4 × 71.1 cm.); 29 × 24 in. (73.7 × 61.0 cm.)]	Brooklyn Museum, New York City	possibly IAP 80960073, IAP 80960074, IAP 80960075, IAP 80960077, and IAP 35680050
1762	Portrait of Ann Saltonstall, oil				IAP 71930550
1762	Portrait of Anne Saltonstall, oil on canvas		50 1/4 × 40 3/8 in. (127.6 × 102.6 cm.)	San Antonio Museum of Art, San Antonio, Texas	IAP 67930001
1762	Portrait of Catherine Saltonstall Richards, oil	view	29 3/4 × 24 3/4 in. (75.6 × 62.9 cm.)		IAP 71930549
1762	Portrait of Four Children of Governor Gurdon Saltonstall, oil		41 × 63 1/2 in. (104.1 × 161.3 cm.)	New Haven Museum and Historical Society, New Haven, Connecticut	Subjects: Martha, Henrietta, Gilbert and Sarah Saltonstall. IAP 07210130 and IAP 71930552
1762	Portrait of Mary Saltonstall, oil		30 1/2 × 25 in. (77.5 × 63.5 cm.)	New Haven Museum and Historical Society, New Haven, Connecticut	Subject: lived 1744–1820. IAP 07210131 and IAP 71930551
1762	Portrait of Mrs. John Richards (c. 1762), oil		28 3/4 × 24 3/8 in. (73.0 × 61.9 cm.)		Subject: Susannah Grey. IAP 32050281
1762	Portrait of Mrs. Silas Deane, oil	view	30 1/2 × 25 1/8 in. (77.5 × 63.8 cm.)	Silas Deane House, National Society of Colonial Dames of America, Wethersfield, Connecticut	Subject: Elizabeth Saltonstall (1742–1777); daughter of Brigadier General Gurdon Saltonstall (1708–1785) and Rebecca Winthrop (1711–1776); granddaughter of colonial Connecticut Governor Gurdon Saltonstall (1666–1724); second wife of Silas Deane (1737–1789, American merchant, politician and diplomat). IAP 70580009
1762	Portrait of Samuel Cutts (1762–1763), oil on canvas		50 1/4 × 40 3/8 in. (127.6 × 102.6 cm.)	Metropolitan Museum of Art, New York City	Subject: lived 1726–1801; husband of Anna Holyoke (1735–1812, m. 1762). IAP 71560037
1762	Portrait of Mrs. Samuel Cutts (1762–1763), oil on canvas		50 1/4 × 40 1/2 in. (127.6 × 102.9 cm.)	Metropolitan Museum of Art, New York City	Subject: Anna Holyoke (1735–1812); wife of Samuel Cutts (1726–1801, m. 1762). IAP 71560038
1768	Portrait of Unknown Gentleman, oil		30 × 25 in. (76.2 × 63.5 cm.)	Brush House, Colonial Williamsburg, Williamsburg, Virginia	IAP 55960015 (and possibly IAP 80040973 and IAP 82250003 [reported as 50 × 40 in. (127.0 × 101.6 cm.)])
1769	Sportsman, oil on canvas		49 3/4 × 40 in. (126.37 × 101.6 cm.)	Bowdoin College Museum of Art, Brunswick, Maine	IAP 70080963
1774	Portrait of Sir Richard Acton, oil		50 × 40 in. (127.0 × 101.6 cm.)	Morville Hall, Shropshire, England	Subject: Sir Richard Acton, 5th Baronet (1711/1712–1791); husband of Lady Anne Grey (died 1791; m. 1744). IAP 80970106
1774	Portrait of Lady Anne Acton, oil		50 × 40 in. (127.0 × 101.6 cm.)	Morville Hall, Shropshire, England	Subject: Lady Anne Grey (died 1791); daughter of Henry Grey, 3rd Earl of Stamford (1685–1739) and Dorothy Wright; wife of Sir Richard Acton, 5th Baronet (1711/1712–1791; m. 1744). IAP 80970107
1776	Portrait of Lieutenant Colonel Thomas Dowdeswell, oil		50 × 41 in. (127 × 104.1 cm.)		IAP 80040915 (possibly IAP 61518764, referred to as Colonel Dowdeswell, 1776, oil)
1777	Portrait of Hugh Jones, last known dated portrait by this artist		50 9/16 × 40 1/4 in. (128.4 × 102.2 cm.)	Worcester Art Museum, Worcester, Massachusetts	IAP 23570266
	Child with Drum, oil		30 × 25 in. (76.2 × 63.5 cm.)	view	IAP 80041999
	Portrait of Daniel Wood, oil		25 × 30 in. (63.5 × 76.2 cm.)	Bennington Museum, Bennington, Vermont	IAP 53480021
	Portrait of Hannah Davis				IAP 21180004
	Portrait of Thomas Hughes, oil				
	Portrait of Elizabeth Hughes, oil				
	Portrait of Miss Frances Tucker, oil				Subject: daughter of Henry Tucker of the Grove; lived 1740–1825. IAP 80960070
	Portrait of Mrs. Benjamin Faneuil, oil	Portrait destroyed.			Subject: lived 1708–1776. IAP 80960034
	Portrait of Mrs. Knight of Gosfield, oil on canvas		49.75 x 40 in. (126.4 x 101.6 cm.)		
	Portrait of Morgan Graves in a Blue Jacket, oil on canvas	view		Indiana University Art Museum, Bloomington, Indiana	Included in the Nazi-Era Provenance Internet Portal.
	Portrait of Rebecca Saltonstall Mumford, oil		36 × 48 in. (91.4 × 121.9 cm.)		IAP 73260396
	Portrait of Sarah Reade de Peyster, oil	view	28 3/4 × 24 in. (73 × 61 cm.)		IAP 71771536
	Portrait of Thomas Welles, oil				IAP 71930357
	Portrait of Titus Mead, oil		30 × 25 in. (76.2 × 63.5 cm.)		IAP 61505045
	Portrait said to be of Molly Brant, oil		30 × 25 in. (76.2 × 63.5 cm.)		IAP 80970132
	Self-Portrait, oil		25 × 30 in. (63.5 × 76.2 cm.)	Laguna Art Museum, Laguna Beach, California	IAP 02680018

== Attributed Artworks ==
Although questions remain, these artworks have been attributed to Joseph Blackburn.

Year	Title	Image	Dimensions	Collection	Comments
1749	Portrait of William Samuel Johnson (1749–1750), oil (attributed to Joseph Blackburn)		30 × 25 in. (76.2 × 63.5 cm.)		Subject lived 1727–1819. IAP 80970137
1757	Portrait of Col. Henry Vassall, oil on canvas (attributed to Joseph Blackburn; attributed to John Singleton Copley by some)	view B&W	30 × 25 in. (~74.7 × ~61.8 cm.)		Subject: lived 1721–1769; husband of Penelope Royall (1724–1800); father of Elizabeth (wife of Dr. Charles Russell). IAP 20770007 and IAP 20480366
1750	Portrait of Mrs. Henry Vassall (c. 1750), oil (attributed to Joseph Blackburn; attributed to John Singleton Copley by some)		17 1/2 × 15 in. (44.5 × 38.1 cm.)	Cambridge Historical Society, Cambridge, Massachusetts	Subject: Penelope Royall (1724–1800); wife of Col. Henry Vassall (1721–1769); mother of Elizabeth (wife of Dr. Charles Russell). IAP 20770008 and IAP 82110804
1754	Portrait of Colonel Moses Titcomb (c. 1754–1755), oil on canvas (attributed to Joseph Blackburn)	view	30 × 25 in. (76.2 × 63.5 cm.)	Yale University Art Gallery, New Haven, Connecticut	Subject lived 1707–1755. IAP 07260855 and IAP 80970120
1754	Portrait of Edward Bromfield (c. 1754–1764), oil on canvas (attributed to Joseph Blackburn)		50 × 40 in. (127.0 × 101.6 cm.)	Fruitlands Museum, Harvard, Massachusetts	Subject: Boston merchant (1695–1756); father of Col. Henry Bromfield. IAP 21560231 and IAP 80960018
1754	Portrait of Mrs. Peter Harrison (c. 1754–1755; attributed to Joseph Blackburn)			Redwood Library and Athenaeum, Newport, Rhode Island	Subject: Elizabeth Pelham (died 1784); wife of Peter Harrison (1716–1775; colonial American architect). IAP 47370121
1756	Portrait of Jonathan Belcher, Jr., oil (attributed to Joseph Blackburn)		60 × 48 in. (152.4 × 121.9 cm.)		Subject: Jonathan Belcher (1710–1776). IAP 80970128
1756	Portrait of Mrs. Jonathan Belcher, Jr, oil (attributed to Joseph Blackburn)				Subject: Abigail Allen (1756–71). IAP 80970129
1760	Portrait of Elizabeth Vassall Oliver, oil (attributed to Joseph Blackburn)		24 × 18 in. (61.0 × 45.7 cm.)	Museum of Fine Arts, Boston, Massachusetts	Subject lived 1739-c.1808. IAP 80970139
1760	Portrait of Lady Bernard, oil (attributed to Joseph Blackburn)		50 × 40 in. (127.0 × 101.6 cm.)	Wadsworth Atheneum, Hartford, Connecticut	Subject: Amelia Offley (died 1778). IAP 80970131
1760	Portrait of Mrs. Isaac Winslow and Daughter Hannah (c. 1760; c. 1756 in some sources), oil (attributed to Joseph Blackburn)		37 × 28 3/4 in. (94 × 73 cm.)	Museum of Fine Arts, Houston, Texas	IAP 51330010 (and possibly IAP 80410003)
1780	Portrait of Lady in Blue (c. 1780), oil on canvas (attributed to Joseph Blackburn)	view	29 × 22 in. (73.7 × 55.9 cm.)	Brigham Young University Museum of Art, Provo, Utah	IAP 53140035
	Lady in Blue with Child (attributed to Joseph Blackburn)		50 × 40 in. (127.0 × 101.6 cm.)	Daughters of the American Revolution Museum, Washington, D.C.	IAP 08270008
	Portrait of Captain Robert Ball, oil (attributed to Joseph Blackburn)		40 × 33 in. (101.6 × 83.8 cm.)		IAP 80960013
	Portrait of Ferdinando Fairfax, oil (attributed to Joseph Blackburn)		18 × 15 in. (45.7 × 38.1 cm.)		Subject lived 1774–1820. IAP 81870036
	Portrait of Mrs. Holmes, oil (attributed to Joseph Blackburn)		30.1 × 24.1 in. (76.5 × 61.2 cm.)	Hampton National Historic Site, Hampton, Maryland	IAP 56940159
	Portrait of Mrs. Josiah Wilder, oil on canvas (attributed to Joseph Blackburn)		13 × 17 in. (33 × 43.2 cm.)		Subject: Mary 'Polly' Flagg (1750–1821). IAP 85600006
	Portrait of Mrs. Richard Curson, oil (attributed to Joseph Blackburn)		30 × 25 in. (76.2 × 63.5 cm.)		Subject: Elizabeth Becker (1731–89). IAP 80970133
	Portrait of Samuel Moffatt (attributed to Joseph Blackburn)			Moffatt-Ladd House, Portsmouth, New Hampshire	Subject lived 1738–1780. IAP 70880046
	Portrait of Sir William Johnson, oil (attributed to Joseph Blackburn)		30 × 25 in. (76.2 × 63.5 cm.)		Subject lived 1715–1774. IAP 80970136
	Portrait of Thomas Dering, oil (attributed to Joseph Blackburn)		22 1/8 × 17 1/4 in. (56.2 × 43.8 cm.)		Subject lived 1720–1785. IAP 80970134

== Sources ==
- Inventories of American Painting (IAP), Smithsonian Institution Research Information System(SIRIS): http://sirismm.si.edu/siris/aboutari.htm
