= Wentworth–Coolidge Mansion =

Historic house in New Hampshire, United States

Wentworth–Coolidge Mansion Historic Site
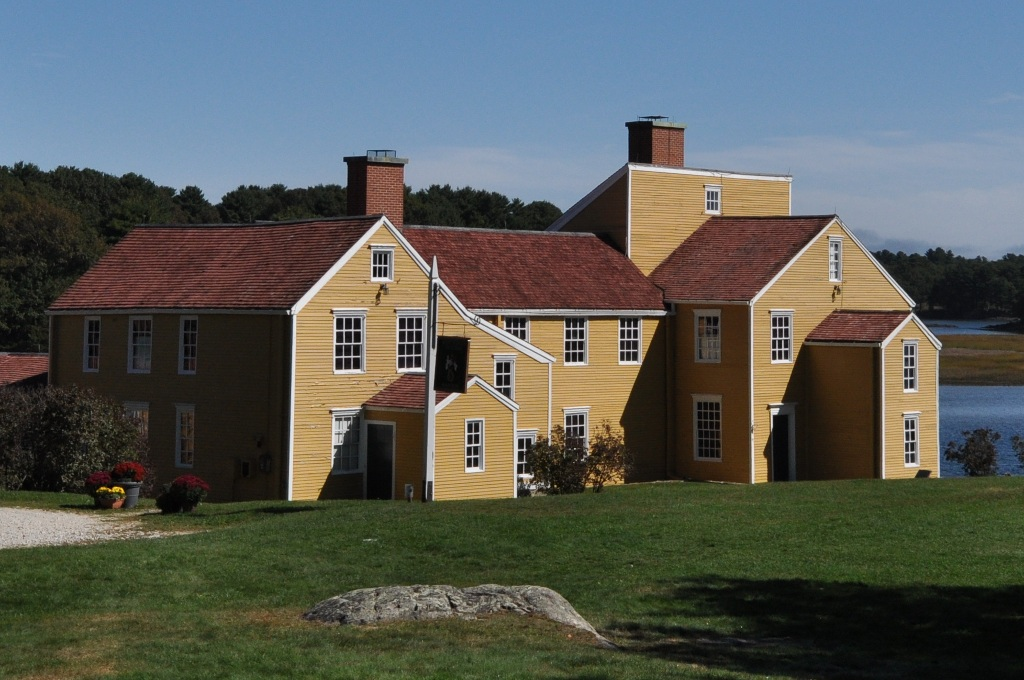

- Location within New Hampshire
- Interactive map of Wentworth–Coolidge Mansion Historic Site
- Location: Portsmouth, New Hampshire, United States
- Coordinates: 43°3′42″N 70°44′20″W
- Established: 1954
- Administrator: New Hampshire Division of Parks and Recreation
- Website: Official website
- Wentworth-Coolidge Mansion
- U.S. National Register of Historic Places
- U.S. National Historic Landmark
- Built: 1750
- Architectural style: Colonial
- NRHP reference No.: 68000011
- Added to NRHP: November 24, 1968

Wentworth–Coolidge Mansion is a 40-room clapboard house which was built as the home, offices and working farm of colonial Governor Benning Wentworth of New Hampshire. It is located on the water at 375 Little Harbor Road, about two miles southeast of the center of Portsmouth. It is one of the few royal governors' residences to survive almost unchanged. The site is a New Hampshire state park, declared a National Historic Landmark in 1968. The New Hampshire Bureau of Historic Sites manages the site with the assistance of the Wentworth-Coolidge Commission, a group of volunteer civic and business leaders appointed by the Governor.

== History of the house and ownership ==
In 1741, the governorship of the province of New Hampshire was separated from that of the Province of Massachusetts Bay, and Benning Wentworth, son of former Lieutenant-Governor John Wentworth, was appointed its royal governor. He requested that the General Court erect a capitol in Portsmouth, but was refused.

In 1741 Wentworth rented a brick mansion in Portsmouth from his sister Sarah Wentworth Macpheadris Jaffrey, the house now known as the Warner House. That house effectually served as the governor's mansion for about seventeen years.

Wentworth petitioned the legislature to purchase the brick house as an official residence he termed a "Provincial House" in one of his petitions of April 26, 1753, but their offering price was below the owner's asking price, and the purchase was never made.

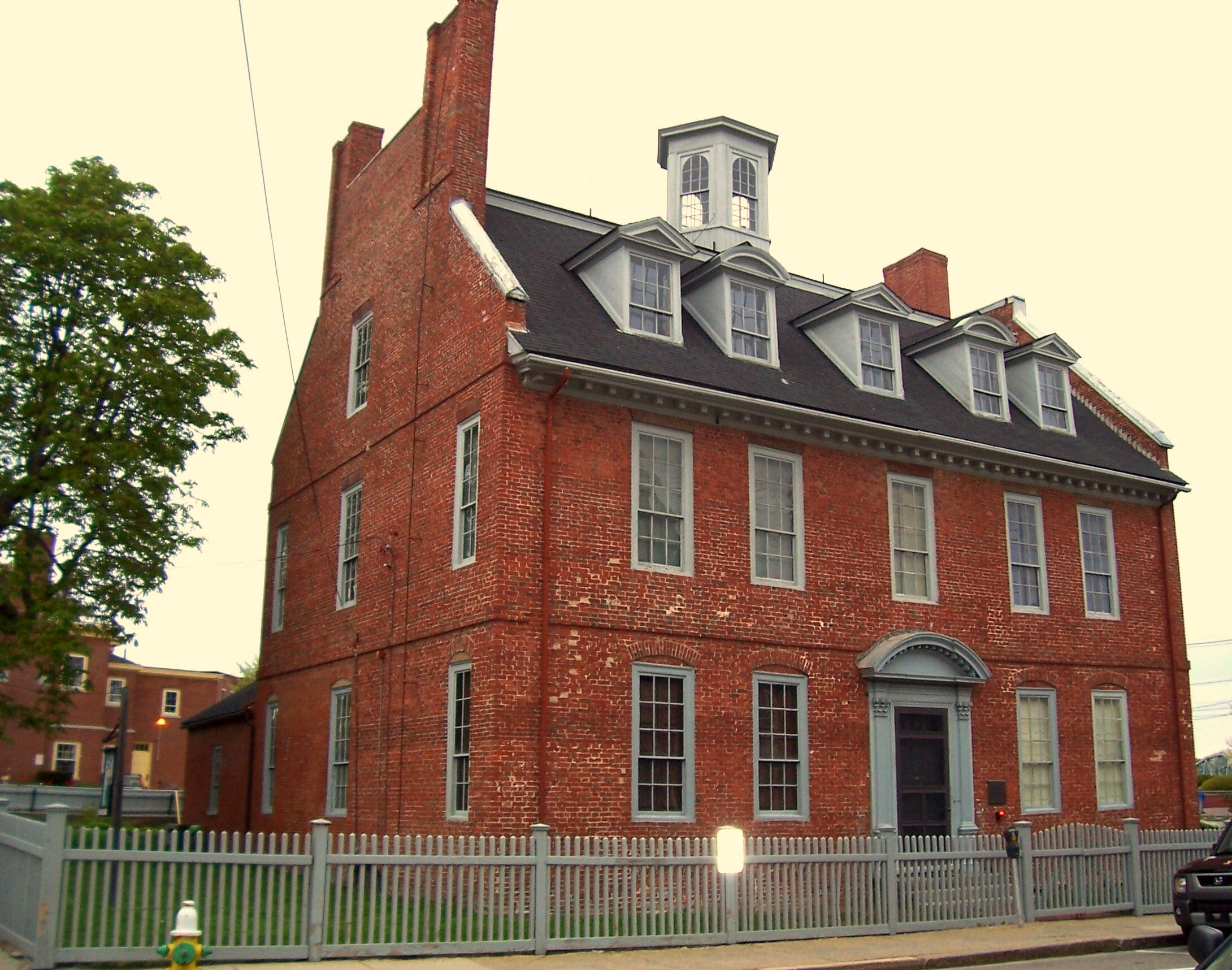
The Warner House, where Benning Wentworth lived prior to moving to the house at Little Harbor

Since circa 1750 Wentworth's son Major John Wentworth had been assembling a rural property in the area on the outskirts of Portsmouth along a back channel of the Piscataqua River known as Little Harbor. It included a 100-acre (40 ha) working farm, and residential space. Acquisition of outlying country farms was characteristic of Portsmouth's urban mercantile elite.

The structure was made from existing buildings moved to the site and cobbled together with new sections, giving the house its eccentric asymmetrical appearance. Analysis shows it to be an assemblage of at least four, and possibly five, preexisting buildings.

Wentworth's waterside country seat seems to have been comfortable for residence by 1753, when in a petition to the legislature to purchase the in-town brick house, he explains that he has provided himself a house to move his furniture into so it would not be in the way of workmen who would remodel the brick house: "This being the most advantageous season to make Provisions for a Provincial House, I am hoping you will Embrace it, that neither myself or the Government may be put to any further inconvenience on that account. For this end, I have Provided a house to remove my furniture into, that the workmen may have no interruption from me if the Brick House should be thought most convenient."

Wentworth gave up rental of the brick house in 1759, the presumed year of a permanent move to the Little Harbor mansion, whence he likely continued to sign charters creating new towns across New Hampshire and Vermont. The practice of making land grants continued, presumably from the new house, until the crown imposed a moratorium in 1764.

Today, the house is approached via a roundabout land route, including through a stretch of forest, accentuating a sense of remoteness. However, this route was likely cleared farmland at the time. More significantly, the house is closer to Portsmouth via water than via the land route. Numerous in-town wharves and extant wharves at the Little Harbor mansion suggest a quick and easy water route. The main channel of the Piscataqua River, a tidal estuary, has notoriously fierce currents. Even a back-channel route passing behind the various islands that dot the southwest edges of the river have deceptively swift currents, including the small and seemingly still tidal harbor at which the house is situated, as illustrated in an announcement in the New Hampshire Gazette, May 12, 1758: "Last Tuesday a very likely young Negro Man, belonging to his Excellency our Governor, in wading into the Water, at Little Harbour, in order to bring a small Float ashore, was, by the strength of the Tide, carried off into deep Water, and so drowned."

Wentworth continued to own the property until his death in 1766, when it passed to his second wife, Martha Hilton. She subsequently married a distant British relation of Benning's, Michael Wentworth. Because of the direct property transfer from Governor to widow by will, the contents of the house were not probated or inventoried at the time of his death. The house was inventoried upon Michael's death in 1795. The contents of the house were sold at auction in 1806, with publicity that listed some items in the mansion. Together, these documents provide a glimpse of the contents, that may have been an undifferentiated mix of Martha's furnishings and items surviving from the governor's era.

In 1803 the house and land were advertised for sale in the local newspapers, first in the New Hampshire Gazette on May 17, 1803, and a few days later in the Portsmouth Oracle on May 21, 1803. Martha died in 1805 and willed the property to her daughter, Martha. The younger Martha had married Sir John Wentworth in 1802, and his name is identified on a map of 1812. This map was made by a British-trained cartographer then in Portsmouth, J. G. Hale. The map is titled "A Plan of Wentworth Farm in the Town of Portsmouth and State of New Hampshire Belonging to John Wentworth, Esq. 1812."

The Cushing family acquired the property in 1816, and operated it as a farm. By the 1840s they began showing the old mansion, one of America's first historic houses open to the public. This was a significant signal of what would become, toward the end of the century, a growing interest among Americans in their own history as represented in surviving historic buildings and the stories of people associated with them, as exemplified in the 1850s by efforts to save George Washington's home in Virginia.

From the Cushing family, the property was purchased with about 15 acres (6.1 ha) in 1886 by John Templeman Coolidge III and his wife. They renovated, restored and expanded the mansion with the assistance of Sumner Appleton, founder of the Society for the Preservation of New England Antiquities. That society's interest in preserving colonial architecture was a characteristic expression of the Colonial Revival movement. The society acquired, preserved and opened a number of historic properties in the Piscataqua River area.

Photos from as late as 1937 show the house furnished with an assortment of antiques, arranged to satisfy late-nineteenth and early-twentieth century taste and sense of comfort, characteristic of Colonial Revival interiors.

Coolidge's widow, his second wife, Mary Abigail Parsons Coolidge, donated the Wentworth–Coolidge Mansion to the state in 1954.

== Organization of the house ==
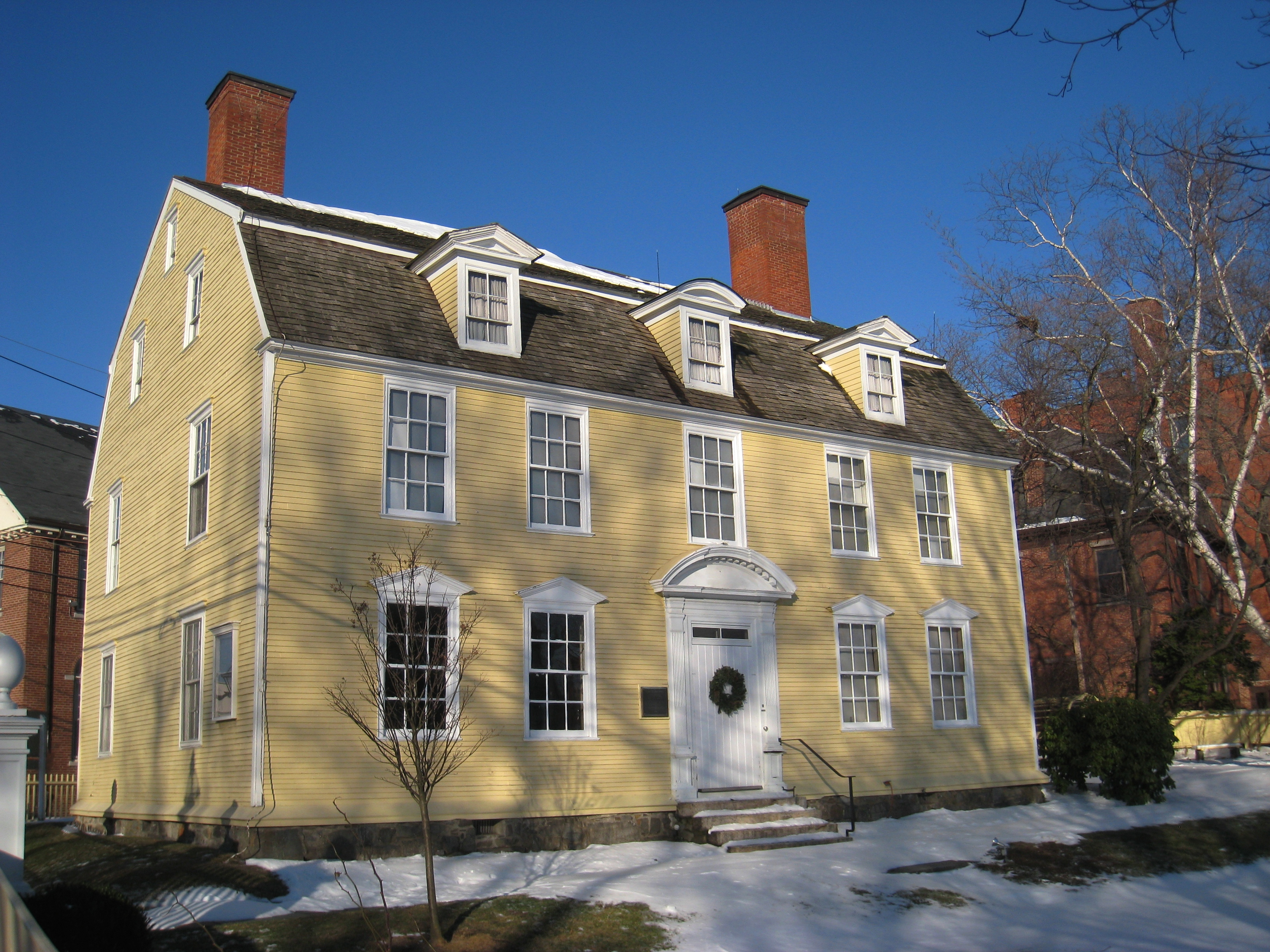
The Gregory Purcell House (a.k.a. John Paul Jones House) of 1758 characterizes the symmetry preferred by Portsmouth's elite at the time Benning Wentworth assembled his eccentric house at Little Harbor.

Externally, the house is a radical divergence from the symmetry preferred for grand houses of the mid eighteenth-century, especially those of the power elite of the place and time. Typical of these are the Governor's in-town house, the brick Warner House, that introduced to Portsmouth the symmetry favored by British William-and-Mary style or Queen Anne style architecture. Locally, the British neo-Palladian influence was being felt, perhaps first in the interior of the governor's country mansion (see below), and seen in many Portsmouth houses built by the mercantile elite, such as the John Paul Jones House built by Gregory Purcell in 1758, roughly contemporary with the governor's mansion, and in many subsequent houses that survive in Portsmouth, culminating in the Moffatt-Ladd House built 1760-64 by Michael Whidden II, Richard Mills and Ebenezer Dearing for British immigrant Captain John Moffatt for the use of his son Samuel.

The mansion's odd appearance was a result of its construction by moving and joining preexisting buildings and adding new wings, to make a single composite building.

Some unity of appearance was given with a uniform cladding of the exterior with clapboards, and the interior is finished throughout with plaster and woodwork characteristic of contemporary local high-end domestic architecture. This was accomplished by a joiner or finish-carpenter named Neal who lived in the house as a servant from 1759 onward for at least six years.

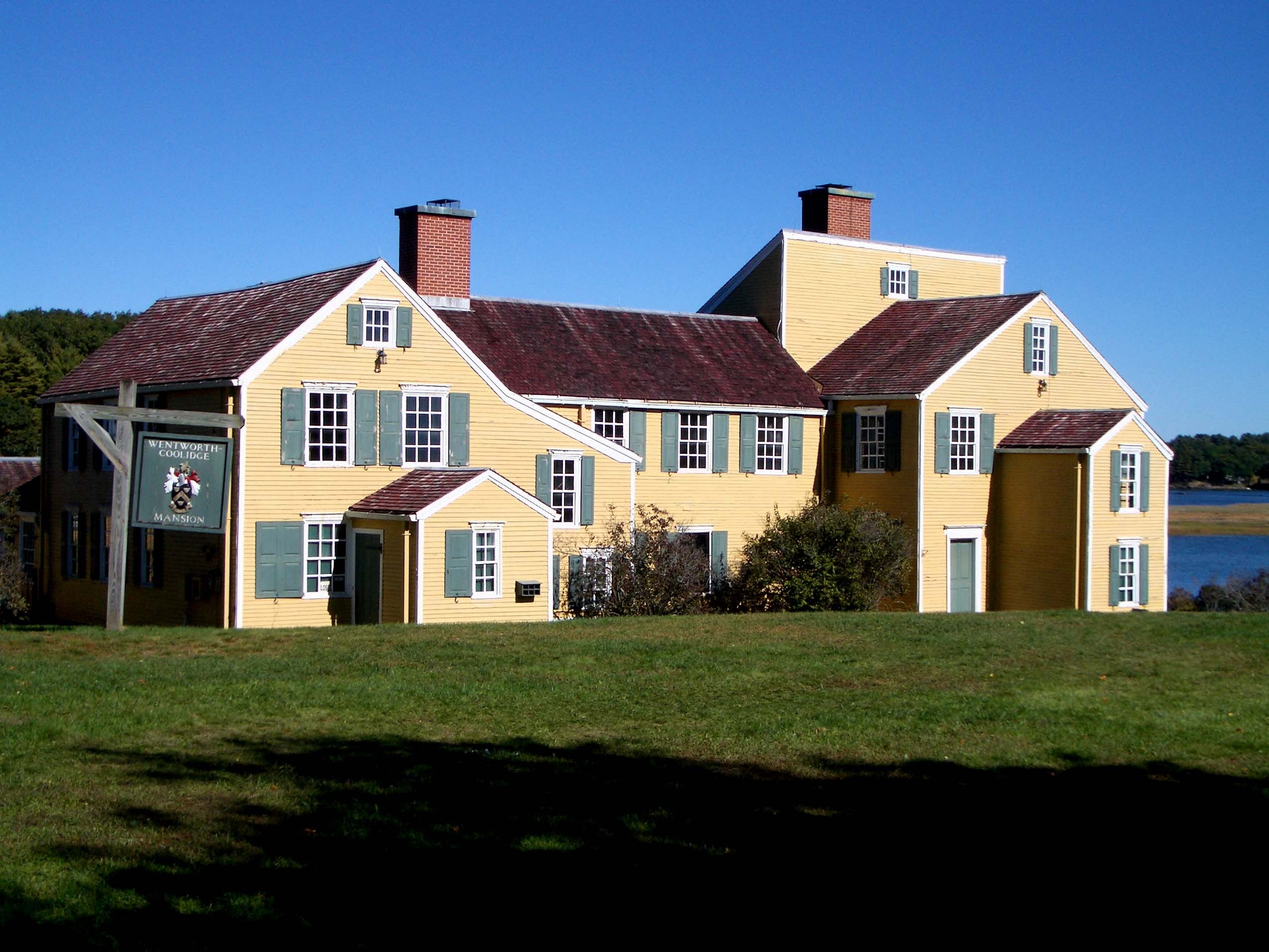
The random assembly of the Wentworth-Coolidge Mansion makes a vigorous contrast to the norms of the place and time.

Within the house, the visual chaos of the exterior gives way to a maze of rooms that is nonetheless clearly hierarchical in function. The status of each space is readily identified by both size and finish of rooms, and are distributed in three wings, that appear to be intended, respectively, for formal entertaining, family life, and servants' work. Each of these sections has its own entrance and staircase.

Hierarchical organization of large houses stems from seventeenth-century French prototypes as filtered through post-restoration British examples. How Wentworth knew about this is unclear. Wentworth's father Lieutenant Governor John Wentworth was a distant relation of Charles Watson-Wentworth, 2nd Marquess of Rockingham. Benning may have been aware of that distant relation's neo-Palladian expansion of his family's country seat in the 1730s and '40s at Wentworth Woodhouse in Yorkshire, transforming it into one of the largest mansions in Europe. Benning Wentworth himself seems to have been in London in the 1730s to deal with a mercantile affair that, through a complex chain of events involving creditors and royal petitions, both drove him into bankruptcy and elevated him to the governorship of New Hampshire. Also, Wentworth was an Anglican in a predominantly Calvinist/Congregationalist region, furthering his ties to British culture, and differentiating himself from the locals among whom he was born and raised. Those who disliked him, referred to him as a Spanish grandee, associating his imperious self-presentation with his exposure to European culture through his trade with Spain back in the 1720s.

The formal style Wentworth mimicked characteristically had public areas including an impressive hall and a grand salon, known in Britain as a saloon. Lesser in scale but typically more opulent in finish were semi-private drawing rooms, and still smaller and more opulent were bedrooms and small studies called cabinets (by the French) or closets (by the English). These were usually housed in a symmetrical Baroque or neo-Palladian shell. At Little Harbor, Wentworth followed this interior hierarchical social organization, in a visually haphazard way that adjusted pre-existing frames to an awkwardly sloped landscape.

=== The Formal Wing ===
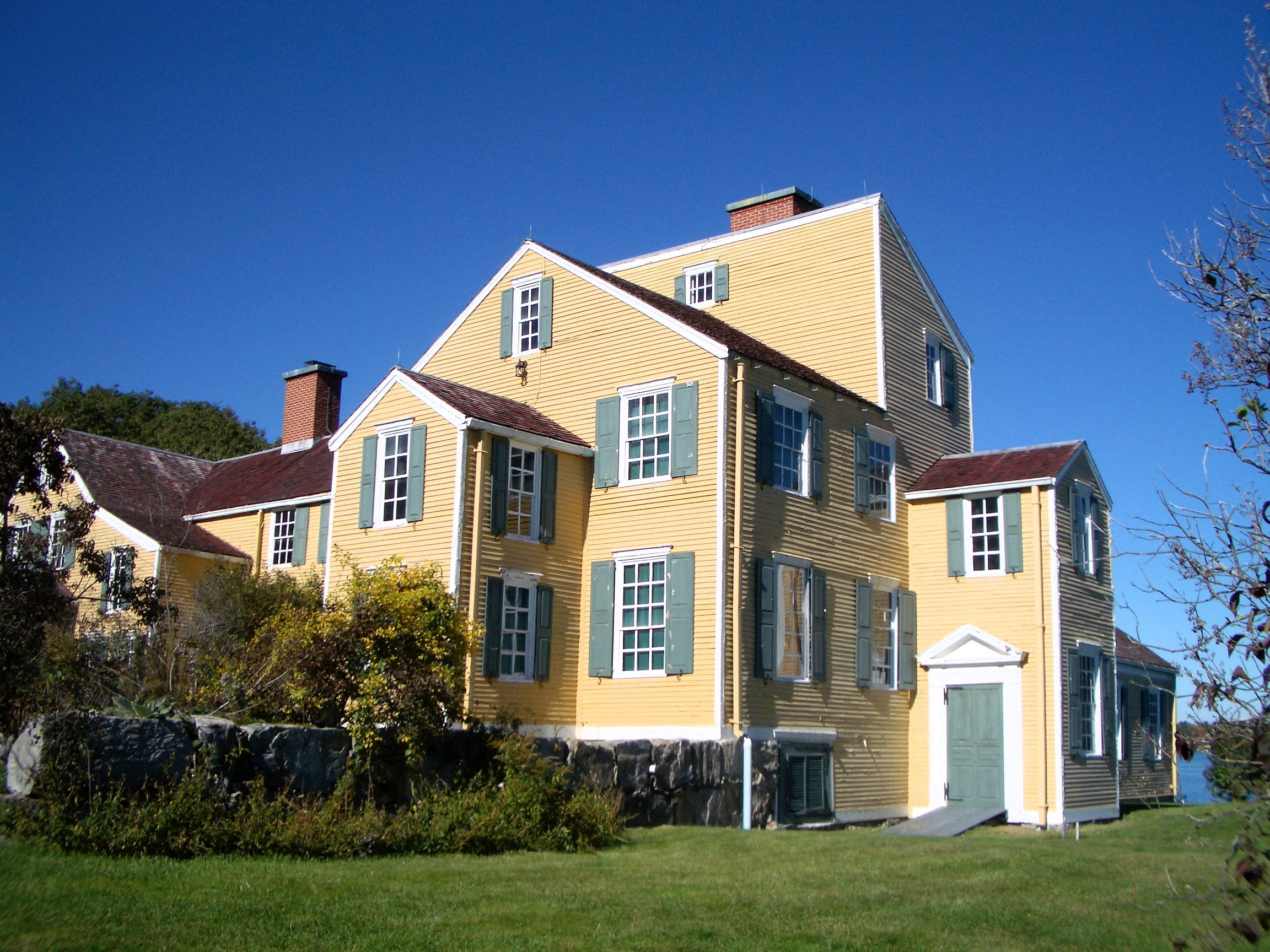
The mansion from the southeast, showing the formal entrance door, with pilasters and pediment

The wing nearest the water appears to be assembled from yet another recycled frame. It consists of a tall vestibule, a grand saloon, and a long room with two small ancillary rooms, plus attics.

The exterior of the door to this wing has a formal frame of pilasters and pediment. Of the several exterior doors, this is the sole one with such elaboration, signaling its priority above the other doors, a pattern that continues within. This door does not face out over the adjacent water, but is turned toward the wharves and a now-extinct original approach drive, both visible and convenient to arrivals by either water or land routes.

Within, the vestibule is finished with a balustered stair, built-in benches, and gun racks above the doors. The benches seem to take the place of the plain uncomfortable chairs that were a standard feature in both European and American houses. These were for servants to wait in, before the invention of bell-pulls allowed them to wait out of sight. (Bell pulls were added to the house later.) They also provided seating for visitors and petitioners waiting to be admitted to inner rooms. The tight space in this vestibule does not allow room for the Windsor chairs enumerated in inventories of the front halls of many larger New England houses of this era.

The gun racks, when outfitted with flintlocks, made an impressive display and reminded those who entered that the governor was head of the colony's militia, with authority to appoint militia officers. As late as the Coolidge ownership, these racks were filled with ten flintlock muskets with bayonets, marked, in French, "Manufactury of the King at Ste. Etienne, 1759." This led to the tradition that the guns were seized in the capture of the French fortress of Louisbourg in Nova Scotia, Canada, in either the campaign of 1745 (locally led) or the campaign of 1758. Whether or not true, the story was consonant with the Colonial Revival love of the past.

To the right of this vestibule are the mansion's largest rooms, parallel to the water's edge. Both these rooms have the highest ceilings in the house, rich woodwork, and very tall windows. Both have built-in corner cupboards, reputedly used for presenting and serving punch, indicating the rooms' probable use for entertainment.

The first room is square. It equates to a British saloon, but in New England parlance was probably called a "parlor", or perhaps "great parlor" to distinguish it from two smaller parlors in another part of the house. Today, the room is traditionally known as the Council Chamber, arising from the folklore that Wentworth convened his council meetings here. There is no evidence that his council ever met here. Nonetheless, the room has a political quality about it that seems deliberate. Preceded by the gun rack in the vestibule, the political theme continues in a large full-length portrait of Benning Wentworth, painted by Joseph Blackburn in 1760, that originally hung in this room. The original is now in the New Hampshire Historical Society, and a reproduction hangs its place. It hangs in the sole wall space in the mansion of sufficient height and breadth to accommodate it. Its size is compelling, 7 feet (2.1 m) tall and 4 feet (1.2 m) wide, with a broad gold frame. It presents Benning in life size, but seems larger than life because it hangs above floor level.

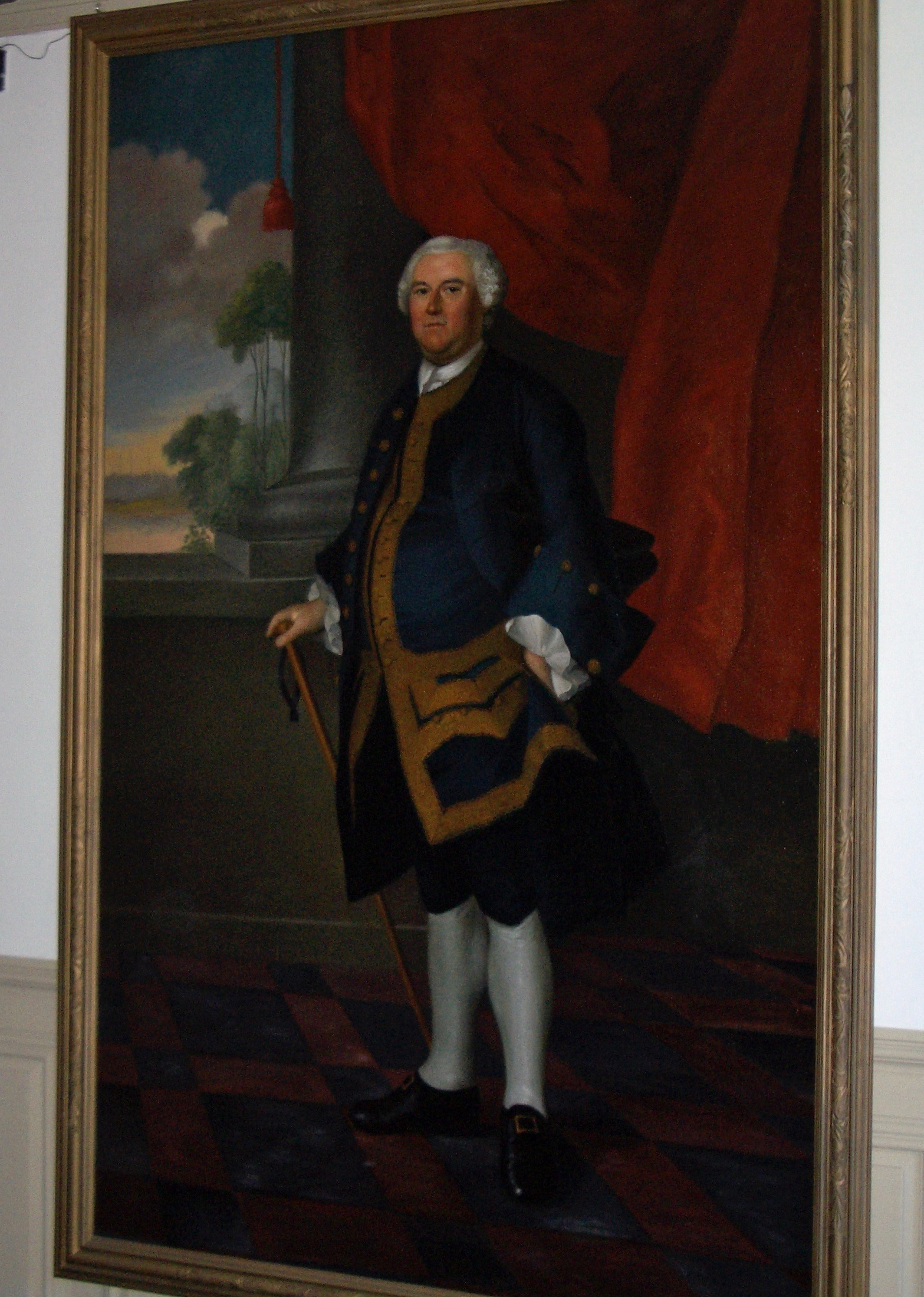
Reproduction of Blackburn's portrait of Benning Wentworth as installed in the house today

This room's most prominent enrichment, the fireplace surround and overmantel, is (for its place and time) a lavish British-style neo-Palladian enframement featuring caryatids, overmantel panel, and rich floral carving. It is a partial copy of a fireplace in the Stone Hall at Houghton Hall, Norfolk, Great Britain, as filtered through a British pattern book, either William Kent's own folio, The Designs of Inigo Jones of 1727, or Edward Hoppus' less costly book The Gentleman's and Builder's Repository of 1738, which contained copies of plates in Kent's book. Houghton Hall was the immense neo-Palladian country seat of Sir Robert Walpole, first prime minister of Britain. Replication of the mantelpiece from that house, one among many to choose from in a pattern book, suggest that Wentworth was consciously connecting himself with the hierarchy of British government.

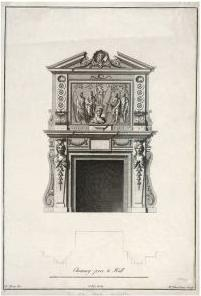
Engraving of the fireplace in the stone hall at Houghton Hall

Architectural analysis of the room indicated the former presence of two "beaufaits", buffets or corner cupboards with backsplashes. Analysis shows there were five of these in the house, of which a single original survives, from which the missing ones were reproduced in the 1960s. Their former presence indicates an anticipated use of this room for entertainment. Their design - half height with a splashback - is unique to this house.

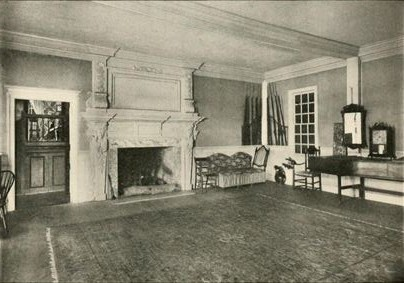
The great parlor, commonly called the Council Chamber, as it looked in the Coolidge era. A Longfellow poem entered legend, and set Wentworth's marriage to his second wife in this room. Through the open door, the half-flight of stairs ascending to the family wing is visible.

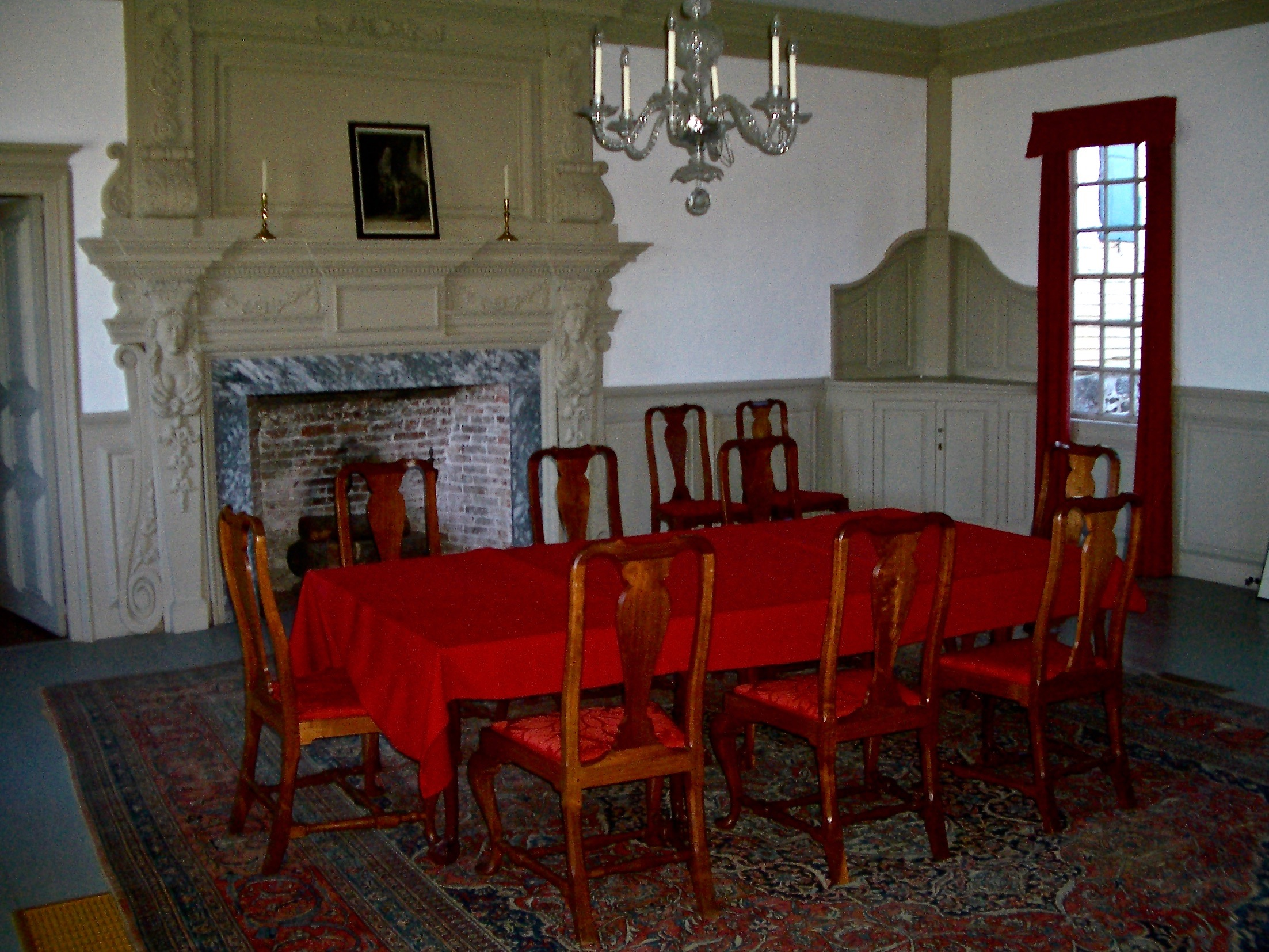
Great parlor as outfitted in the 1980s to suggest a fictive meeting of the governor's council. Reconstructed buffet visible in back corner.

Although no evidence supports the use of the room as a council chamber, the room was furnished in the 1980s to suggest a council meeting with reproductions of local eighteenth-century furniture — two tables draped with scarlet baize and a suite of chairs. Modern American and New Hampshire flags stand in the corner, making a suitable setting for a few modern council meetings in this room that were believed to revive an old practice that seems never to have existed. Those few meetings were, in effect, a continuation of the Colonial Revival, not a revival or recreation of colonial practice.

The next room in this formal wing is long and narrow, with tall windows overlooking the water. It has no fireplace, suggesting its use as a seasonal room, perhaps a summer parlor. Its two beaufaits confirm its intended use for entertainment, but no further clue exists. Its long shape and two small auxiliary rooms suggest its possible use as a ballroom, suited to the long-ways or contradancing that prevailed in this region at the time. The small auxiliary rooms are often interpreted as card rooms or ladies' and gentlemen's cloak rooms. Such an arrangement of smaller rooms off ballrooms survives in the extant eighteen-century ballrooms in Portsmouth, as at the Stoodley's Tavern of 1761 and the William Pitt Tavern of 1766 (with its third-floor room that served multiple purposes, including masonic lodge, auctions, and entertainments). A similar arrangement appeared at the no-longer-extant Portsmouth Assembly House built in 1771.

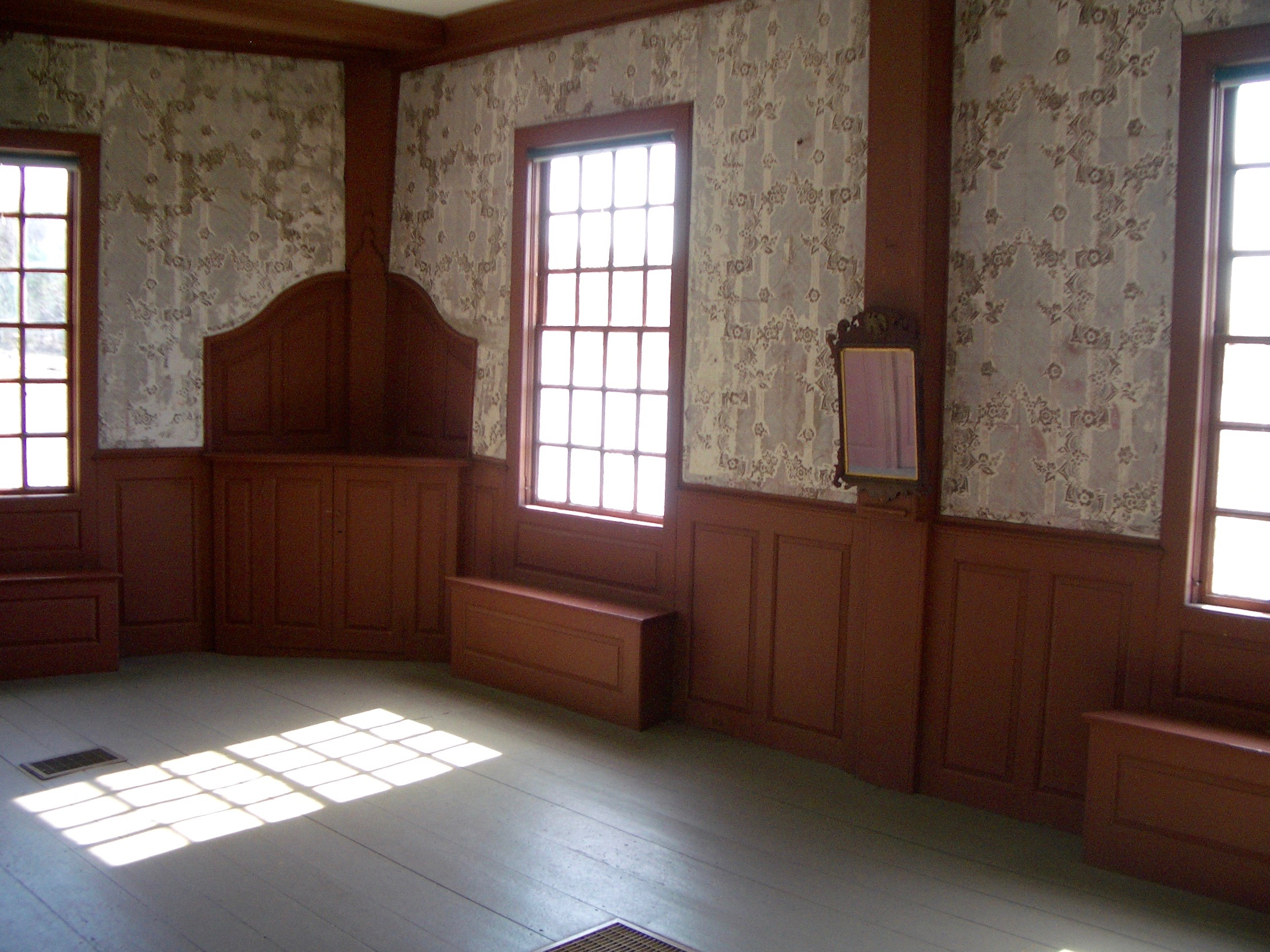
The long room showing extant eighteenth-century corner buffet and late eighteenth century glitter wallpaper.

The long room is decorated with original wallpaper in a rococo pattern with applied glitter. Physical evidence suggests it was applied in the late eighteenth or early nineteenth century, perhaps by Martha and her second husband Michael Wentworth.

=== The Family Wing ===
From the vestibule, a short flight of steps ascends to another wing that extends back from the water. This wing includes a fine parlor (in a section of the house that may have been purpose-built rather than recycled), and a common everyday parlor. Between them are a secondary vestibule, stairhall, and room theorized to have been a study or office (in a section that was recycled from some earlier purpose). Taken together, this suite of rooms provides the elements of a fine family house. Because the floor level is higher than that of the entertainment wing, but the ceiling height constant, this wing has lower ceilings that are both less imposing and create spaces that were easier to heat.

The parlor has bold bolection moldings on its wainscot, painted sky blue. The robust molding may represent the slightly out-of-date taste of a middle-aged man, as Wentworth was in his 50s when the mansion was developed. Or it may be a deliberate reference to the similar molding in the MacPheadris–Warner House where he had lived for seventeen years. The woodwork is not entirely dissimilar to the woodwork in Wentworth's father's house, as seen in a room from it preserved in the Metropolitan Museum of Art. The fireplace wall is fully paneled, with bolection molding around the fireplace opening, which is itself lined with marble.

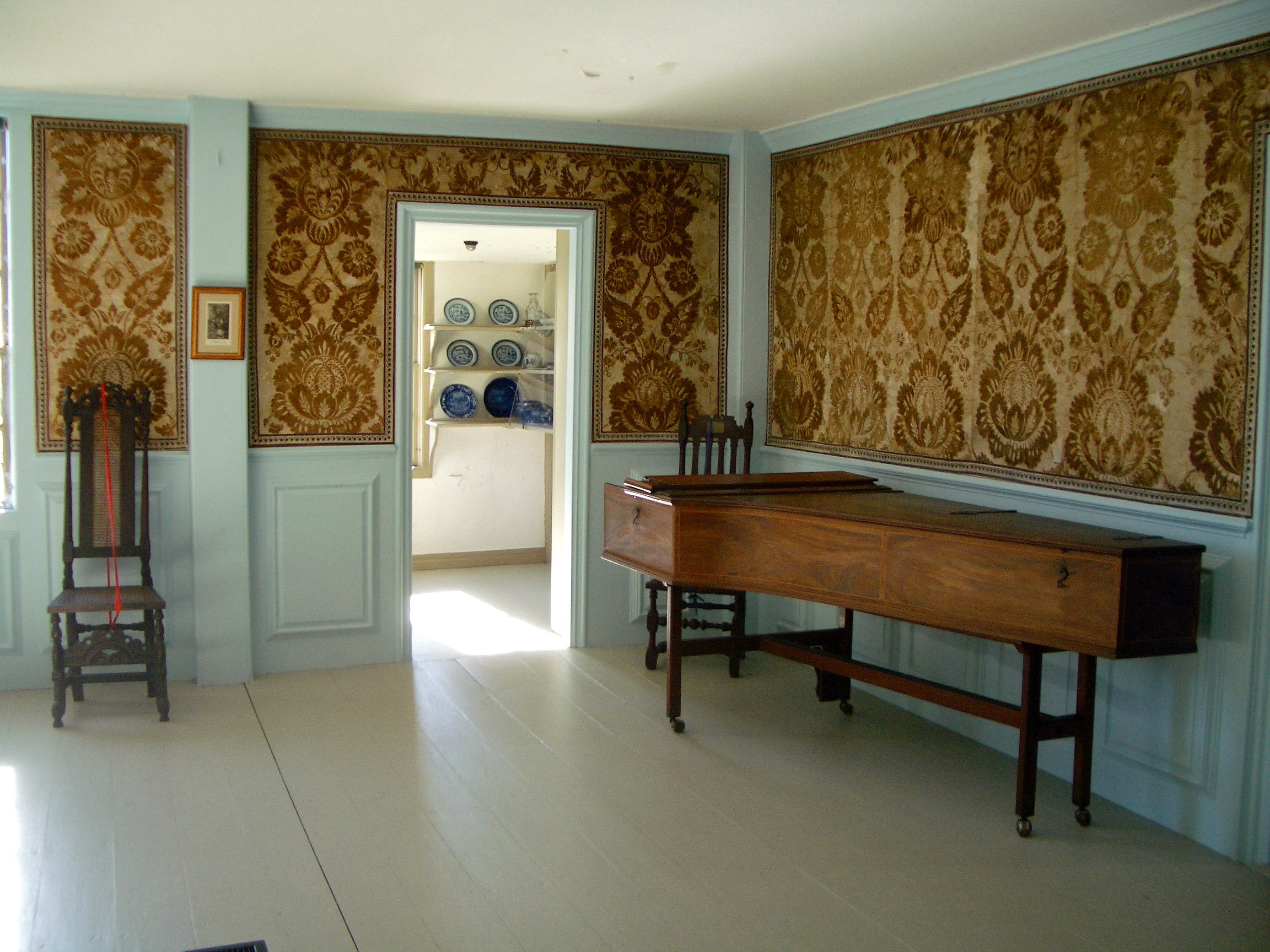
Parlor showing flocked wallpaper, bolection-molded wainscot, harpsichord, and glimpse through to china closet

The parlor walls are ornamented with an original red-on-yellow eighteenth century flocked wallpaper in a very large-scale damask pattern. During restoration of the paper, evidence was found that it may have had an earlier life in another room, and moved here at the time that two more corner "beaufaits" were removed. The latter survived long enough to be listed in an inventory of 1797, when there is an entry for this room of "China & Glass on the corner boards". If the paper had previously been in another room, no clue has shown up to indicate which room. But its scale suggests that it may have been in the great parlor, where it would have added significantly to the imposing character of the space.

The room also has a harpsichord, for generations a fixture of the house, if moved from room to room. It dates to between 1779 and 1785, indicating that it must have been introduced by Martha's second husband Michael Wentworth, who is known to have appreciated music. It is listed in the auction of furnishings in 1806 as "grand Harpsichord, of the finest tone, by Longham and Broderip, cost 75 guineas." Though not part of the governor's furnishings, its antiquity accrued about the instrument the legend that it was his.

Off one side of the parlor is a small lockable room, lined with shelving. This china room is an over-sized version of the lockable parlor cupboards that were and remain fixtures of many high-end Portsmouth houses of this period. The shelves likely held locked caddies of tea, sugar, alcohol, related silver services and china and glass associate with these. Such features had strong gender associations with women. Still rooms appeared in British houses in the sixteenth century, and became common in the seventeenth centuries and later. In those much earlier centuries, distillation of medicines, scents, and cordials was considered an appropriate activity for even wealthy women. This provided the antecedent for women's association with brewing tea, a task transferred from the back of the house to the front of the house to accommodate the latter costly and exotic beverage and its showy equipage. In Wentworth's day, tea was for all practical purposes a monopoly of Canton and the British East India Company, a situation that continued - and kept it expensive - until large-scale commercial tea cultivation was introduced to other Southeast Asian countries by the Dutch and British in the 1820s. The limited source in the eighteenth century kept the price of tea high and gave logic to keeping it under lock and key.

Additionally, in an era when the concept of dining rooms had not yet been introduced to the region (see below), the place of dining remained fluid, migrating according to occasion from family back parlor to best parlor, and perhaps in this house to the great parlor. So, the very large china room or closet makes additional sense, where the best china could be kept under lock and key, away from the knockabout routines of the kitchen.

Thus, a room that might seem puzzling to moderns makes sense in the hierarchical distribution of spaces and functions in the house.

The parlor's location, between the taller entrance of the entertainment wing and the more modest entry of the family wing, suggests the room was a sort of hinge point that could easily be integrated into either family life or large-scale entertainments.

The family entrance includes an outer vestibule and inner hall with stair. The vestibule is sheltered from both prevailing northwesterly winter winds and spring on-shore northeaster storms. The family entrance is hidden from view from the wharves and original entrance road, effectively directing visitors to the only visible door, the formal entrance. The woodwork of these two spaces is modest, as befits their utilitarian function.

Behind it is a small room with small fireplace, and no wainscot. Utilitarian, yet centrally located, it may have been a study. A deep closet between chimney flues has a window at its back to "borrow" light from the vestibule. This gave rise to the legend that the governor could "spy" on arriving guests. The narrowness of the closet and the governor's considerable girth, as recorded in his portrait, are incompatible, suggesting this window was merely for practical illumination of a narrow deep space. In an era when the sole lighting technologies involved dangerous flame, the borrowed light theory is the only logical one. Elsewhere in the house are similar internal windows to borrow light from brighter spaces to dimmer spaces.

Beyond the stair hall is a back parlor. In Benning's day, it was likely an everyday sitting room. It is trimmed with paneling and pilasters on the fireplace wall and wainscot of raised-field paneling in a handsome but lesser scale than in the higher-ranking rooms of the house. In houses with two parlors, such rooms were in daily use by families, for sitting, conversing, sewing, doing paperwork, daily dining, and entertaining more intimate friends, especially in winter, when the fire here might be kept burning all day and the rest of the house cold. In Benning's day, specially-dedicated dining rooms were only just emerging in Britain, and would be unknown in New England until the very end of the eighteenth or beginning of the nineteenth century. For example, the Rundlet-May House, built in 1807–08, incorporated a room believed to be among the first dining rooms in Portsmouth, and in Portsmouth's old-fashioned 1760s Moffatt-Ladd House, a parlor off the front hall was altered to serve as a dining room in the late 1810s with new woodwork and an alcove designed to accommodate a sideboard.

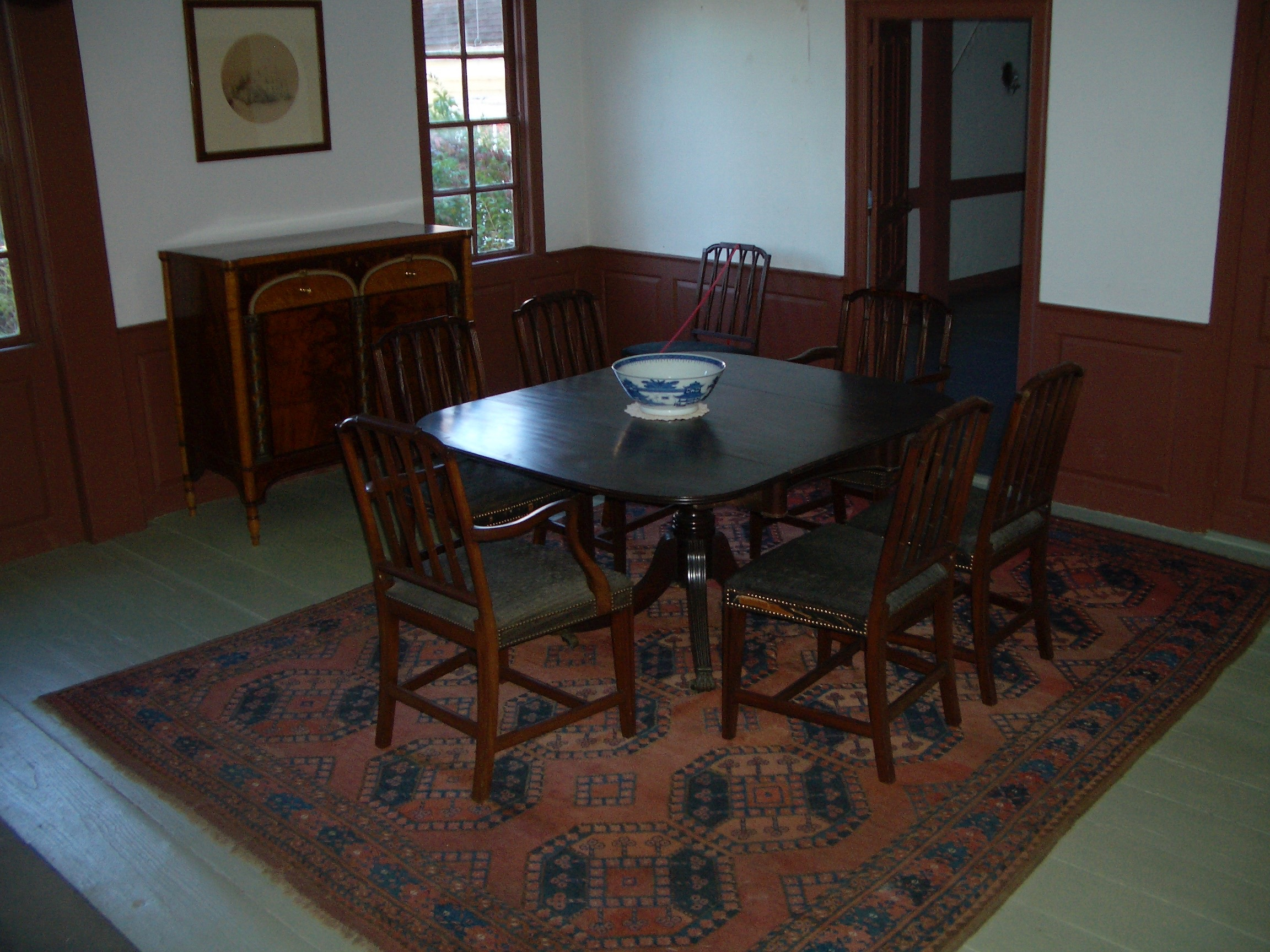
The back parlor as furnished today, to represent a federal-era dining room

The back parlor or sitting room in the Wentworth–Coolidge Mansion is now furnished with federal-era Portsmouth furniture to suggest how it might have appeared if adapted as a dining room in the latter end of the house's occupancy by Michael and Martha Wentworth, when dedicated dining rooms were beginning to appear in New England.

Above these three main rooms are three bedrooms with simpler woodwork in a hierarchy of refinement that descends from a best bedroom above the parlor to lesser chambers above the lesser rooms.

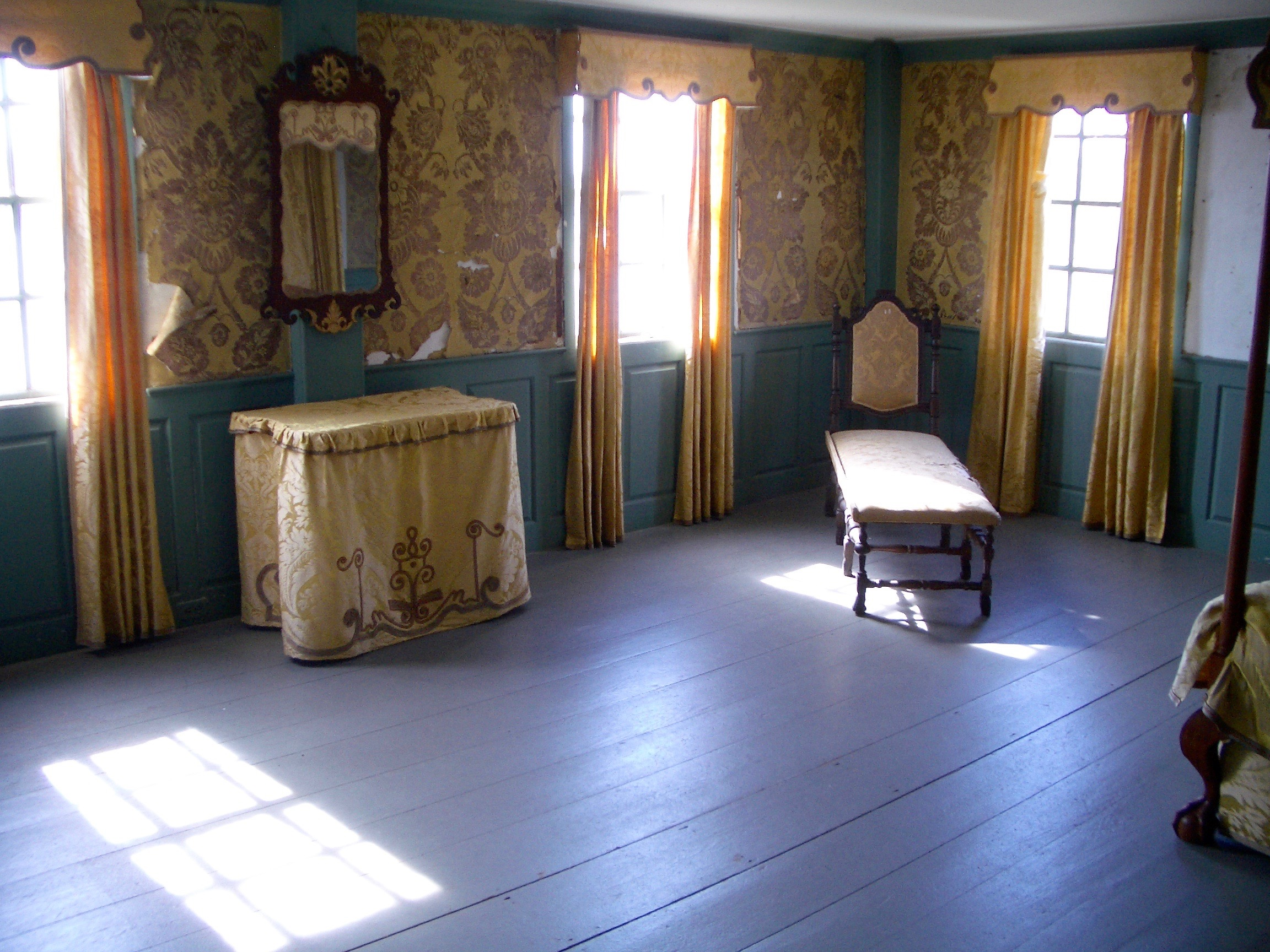
The bed chamber above the parlor, with surviving wallpaper and reproduction fabrics

The bedchamber above the parlor has surviving fragments of the same large-scale red-on-yellow flocked paper as in the parlor below it. The room is outfitted with reproduction yellow wool damask bed canopy, curtains, chair upholstery and dressing table cover en suite in a high-end fashion of the era.

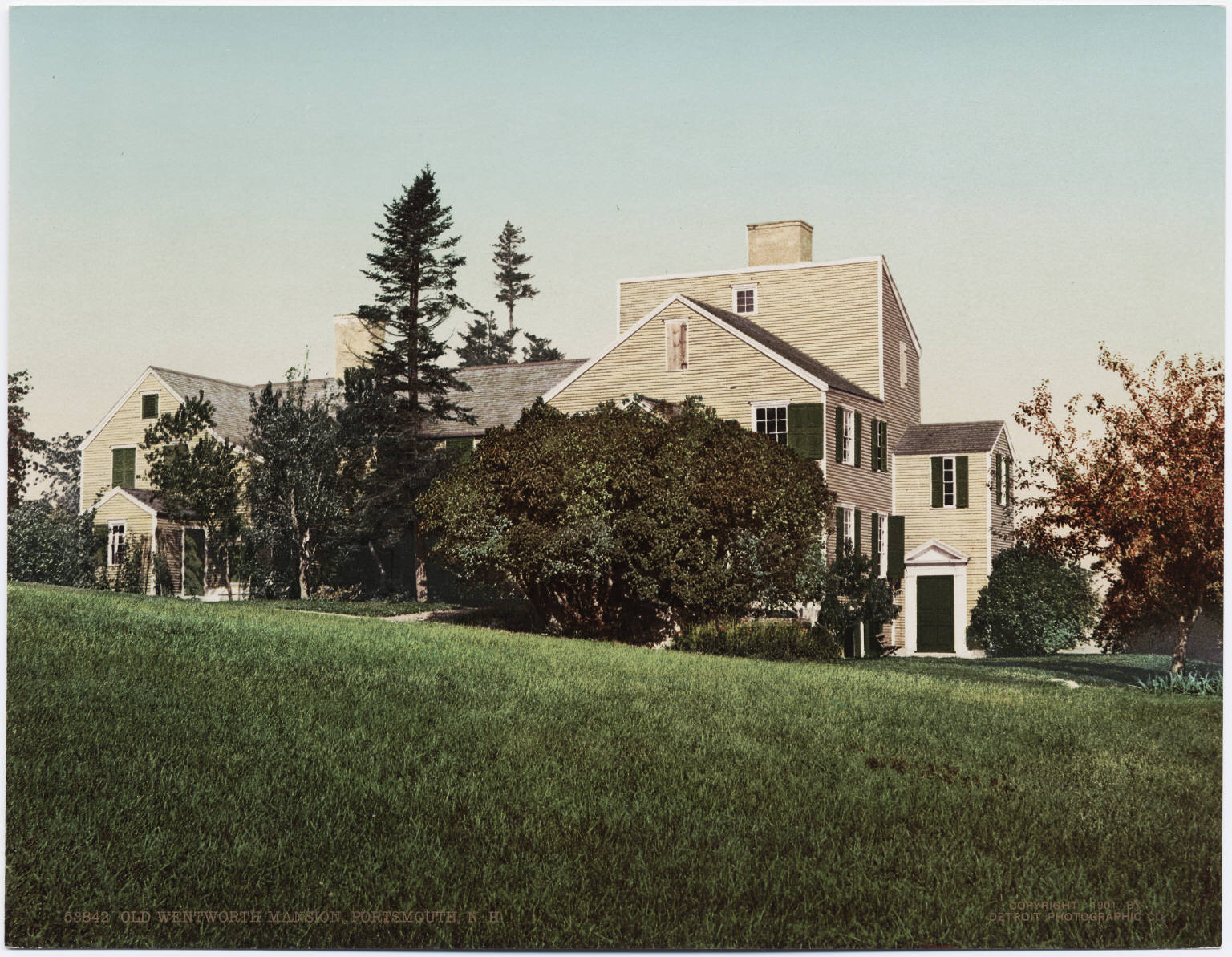
The mansion c. 1901, showing service wing at left and family wing at right. The gable is over the original flat roof deck, and the shed roof behind it shelters the original access stairs.

=== The Service Wing ===
The back portion of the house was a service or support wing. Again, rising steps follow the slope of the land, but constant ceiling levels give the spaces in this wing a still lower ceiling than in the other wings. The rooms here include a large kitchen with large cooking fireplace, a couple of small auxiliary rooms, a brick-floored room presumed to be some kind of food storage room or dairy, and a small French-style "potager" or stewing kitchen (not to be confused with the French vegetable garden of the same name potager), with iron fire baskets or cressets built into a brick counter, with no flues. Technically, these two small rooms fall within the reused frame of the back parlor/dining room, but functionally they belong to the kitchen wing.

The stew kitchen is presumed to be associated with John King, who was described in a 1773 newspaper account as "a Frenchman born, dark complexion, thick-sett, about Five feet six or seven Inches high, wears his own Hair, and talks broken English." King was a Portsmouth tavern keeper whom Benning Wentworth employed to visit the Little Harbor mansion two or three times a week to shave him, dress him, and cook. The type of kitchen may be the only survivor in New England, and is more associated with places with a strong French influence, such as New Orleans and Quebec. They are an exceptional appearance in the New England region, and this one is likely associated with John King. The stew kitchen has a door communicating with the back parlor or dining room, a pass-through to the kitchen, windows for ventilation, and a traditional oven into the main chimney that serves the kitchen. The passage from the back parlor to the kitchen has an additional oven in the side of the chimney.

Behind these are the main kitchen. It has a table built around a central post that seems to be a carryover from the earlier utilitarian function of this portion of the mansion. There are two auxiliary rooms, perhaps pantries, at one end of the kitchen. The combination of large fireplace with broad hearth, two ovens, and French stew kitchen, dairy or pantry, gave the house ample support space for ambitious entertainment.

The upstairs of this wing houses an assortment of rooms of irregular size and relationship, with the plainest woodwork in the house, presumed to have been servants' rooms and work rooms.

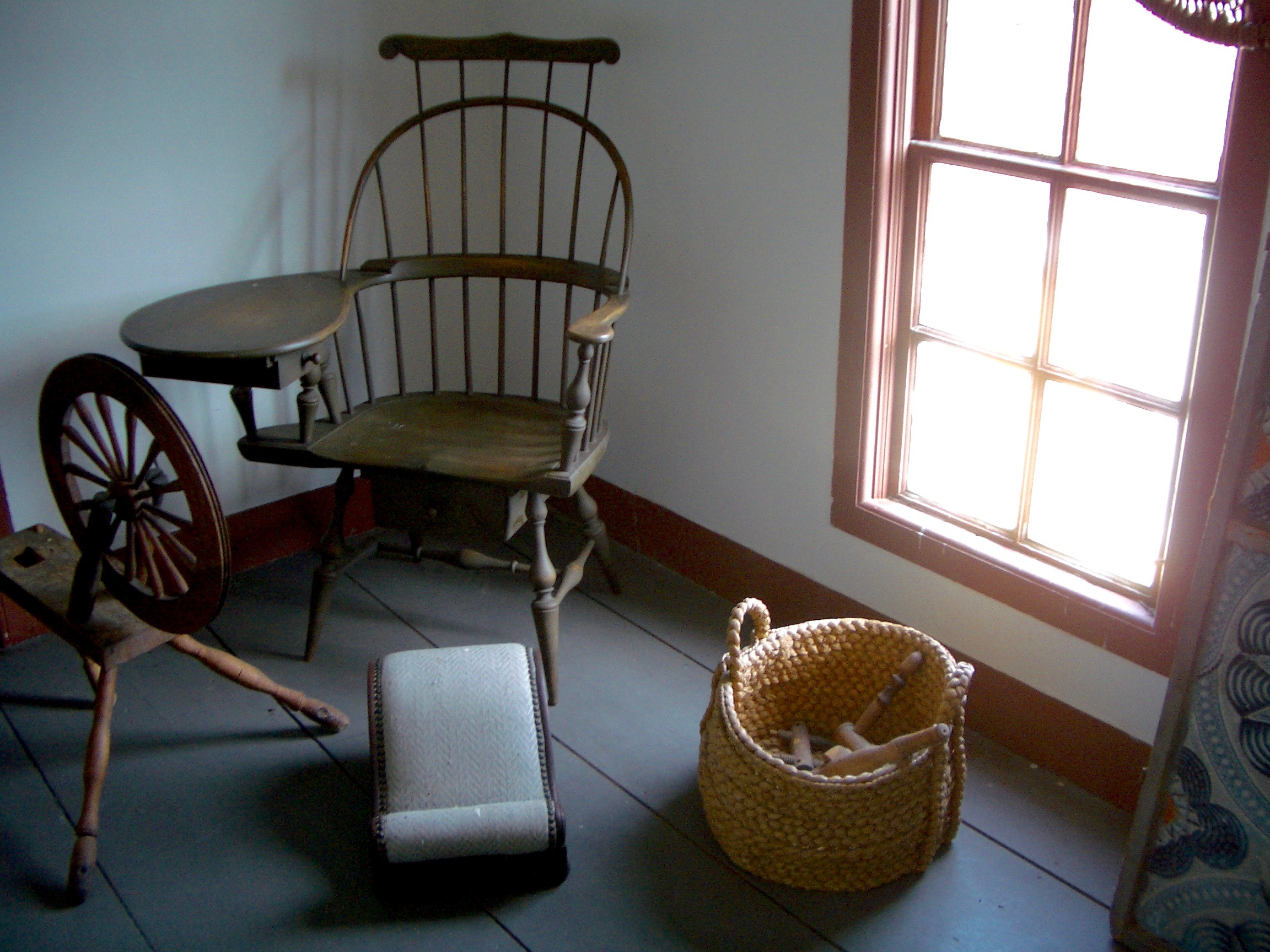
A corner in a room above the kitchens, furnished with antiques to suggest domestic work

This back service wing is served by its own vestibule and staircase, with exterior door facing away from the nearby family door, and entirely hidden from the wharves and original approach road. This made the formal door the only obvious option for arriving visitors in the eighteenth century. This arrangement also meant the comings and goings of hired hands and slaves from adjacent barns, orchards, fields and wharves need not intersect the spaces used by family members or even appear in their view. In a region and period when hired hands were often relatives or children of family friends, and closely integrated into everyday family life, this emphasis on separation and differentiation by status was unusual, but consistent with the governor's political tendencies to aggrandizement (for example, in 1749 he had created and named Bennington Vermont for himself).

In the Coolidge era, a new carriage house (extant) was built at the top of the slope, and a new drive brought in to serve it. Eventually the old approach along the water's edge was discontinued. The newer Coolidge-era approach drive is now the one used by visitors, making the service entrance the most obvious door, and completely hiding the formal entrance down the slope near the water. This inverts the original intended impression.

There are two further wings that date to the Coolidge ownership in the late nineteenth or early twentieth centuries. At the back, beyond the kitchen, is a low plain service wing added in the Coolidge era. At the water end of the house, off the long room in the formal wing, is a Colonial Revival guest bedroom, with windows over the water on two sides, and its own stair down to a basement-level bathroom. Today this room is used to exhibit objects associated with the Coolidge era.

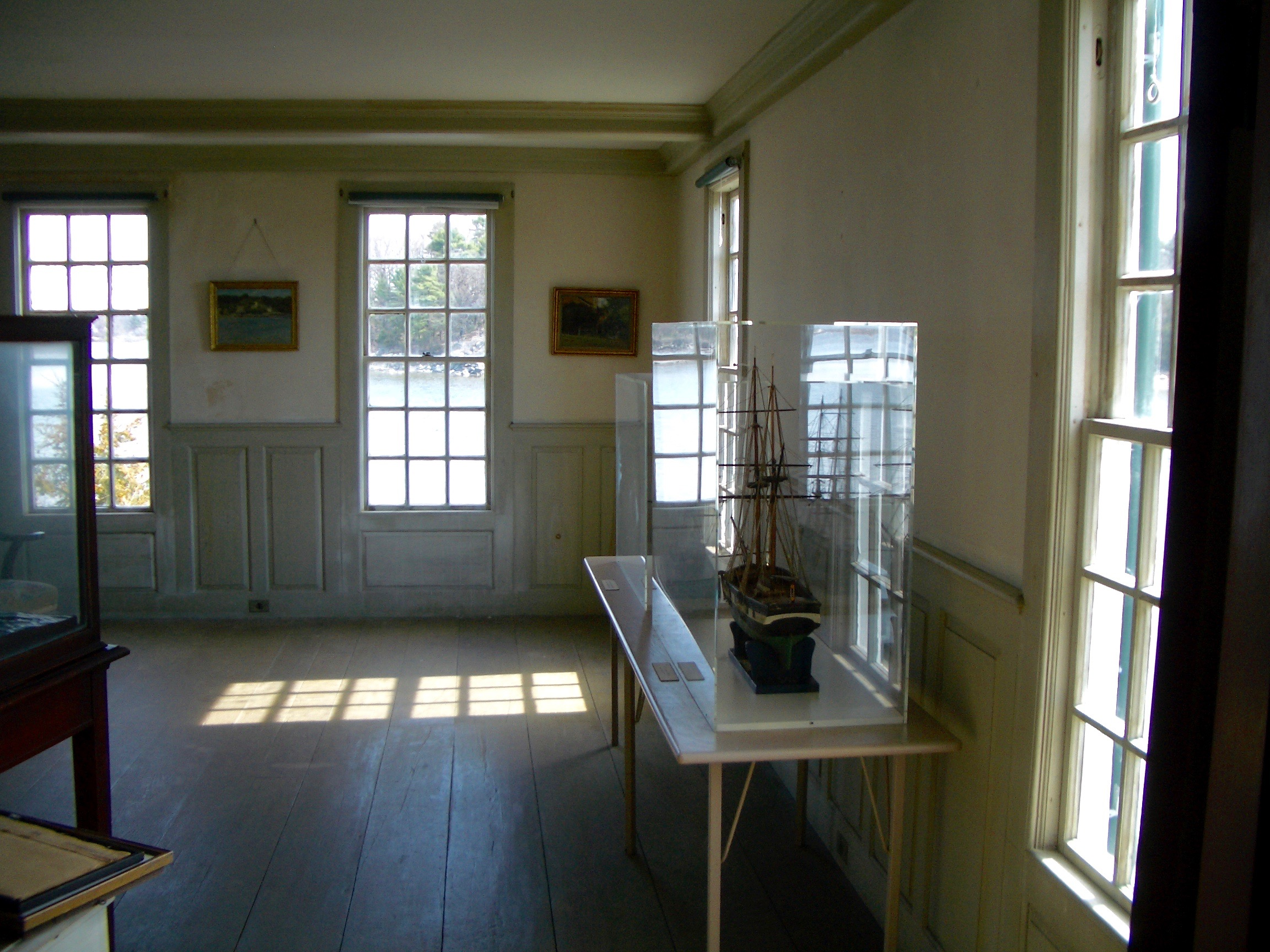
The interior of the guest room added by the Coolidge family at the water's edge

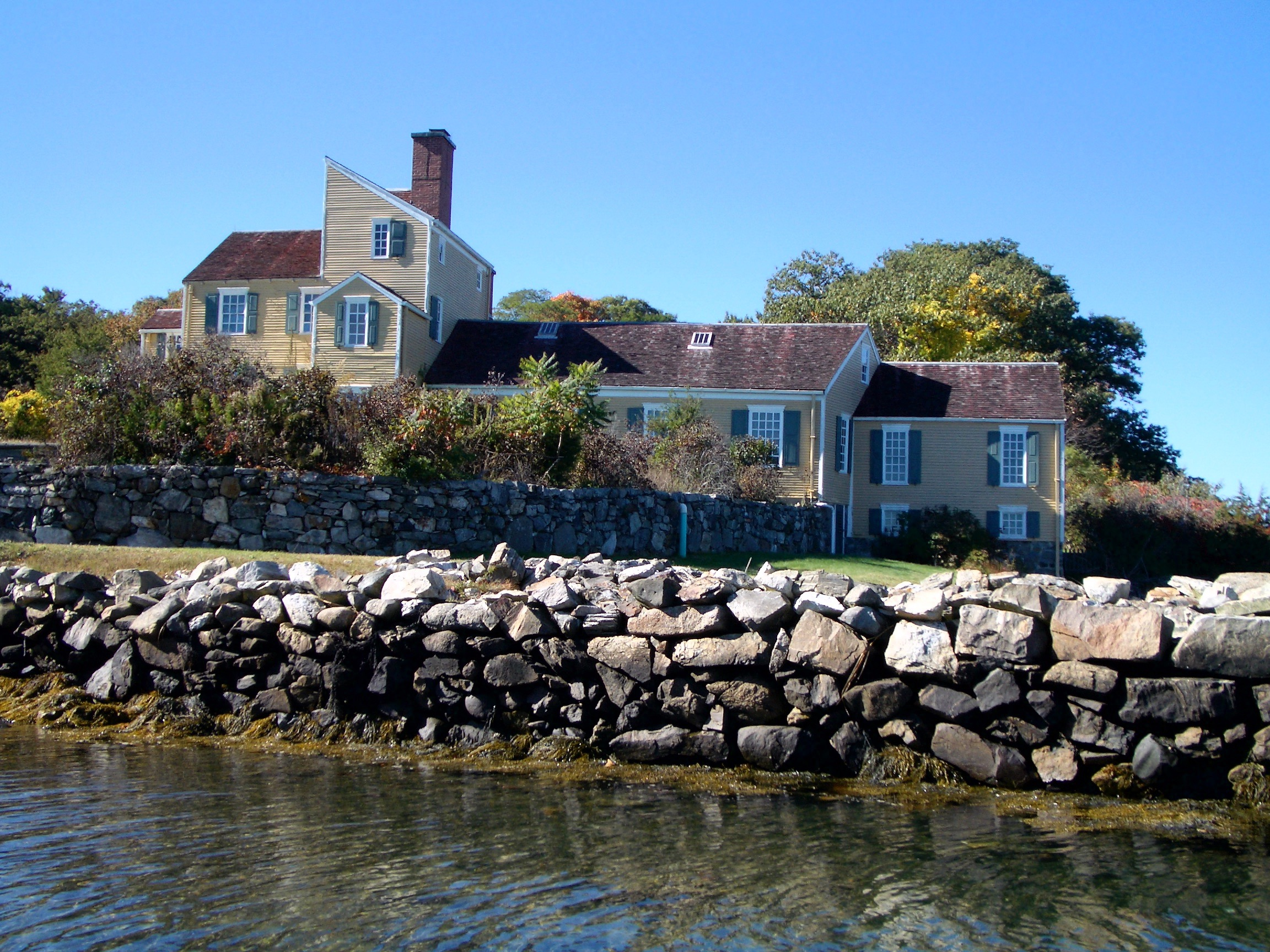
View of mansion from the water, showing at the extreme right, the guest wing added in the Coolidge era.

=== Outdoors ===
The extent to which the outdoors was an extension of the indoor hierarchy is tenuous, but there are traces to be interpreted, notably a small garden, a large garden and a roof deck.

The gardens appear in Hale's 1812 map of the property described above. The small garden was between the formal east entrance and a waterfront building. This corner of the property is described in the map's key collectively as "Wentworth Mansion House, Offices, Flower Garden, Yard &c."

A second and much larger garden lay to the south of the house, and is identified in Hale's map key simply as "Garden" with a size somewhat exceeding an acre. This garden was an elongated rectangle that extended from the south side of the house southward to the approach road, edged on one side by orchard and on the other by the wharf. The map shows a path following the straight-sided perimeter all the way around, an axial central path running southward, and two cross paths, dividing the space into six rectilinear sections. Whether these sections were further subdivided into planting beds, and how this garden was planted, cannot be distinguished from the map's vague stippling. It may have been a practical garden of vegetables and herbs, or a flower garden, or a mix.

In 1803 (see below) the property was described as having a large garden plus a flower garden adjoining the house. At that date, they were described as "both containing all kinds of the best growth of Fruit Trees, Grape Vines, &c." (see below). Whatever the gardens' contents in Benning's era, the spaces were clearly differentiated from the landscape around it.

Today, the site of the smaller garden by the formal entrance is a flat terrace of lawn, and most of the site of the larger garden is now overgrown with trees. The north end of the larger garden, nearest the house, was lawn by the twentieth-century and disrupted in the late twentieth century by the construction of a septic field.

If there is any survivor from those gardens, it may be the lilacs that now surround the house. The mansion is traditionally held to be the site of first introduction of lilacs to New Hampshire, and their later profusion around the mansion account for this being chosen as the state flower in 1919, as much an expression of colonial revivalism and regional pride as of actual history. They are the Syringa vulgaris that originated in eastern Europe and were disseminated outward through Europe and America via French growers.

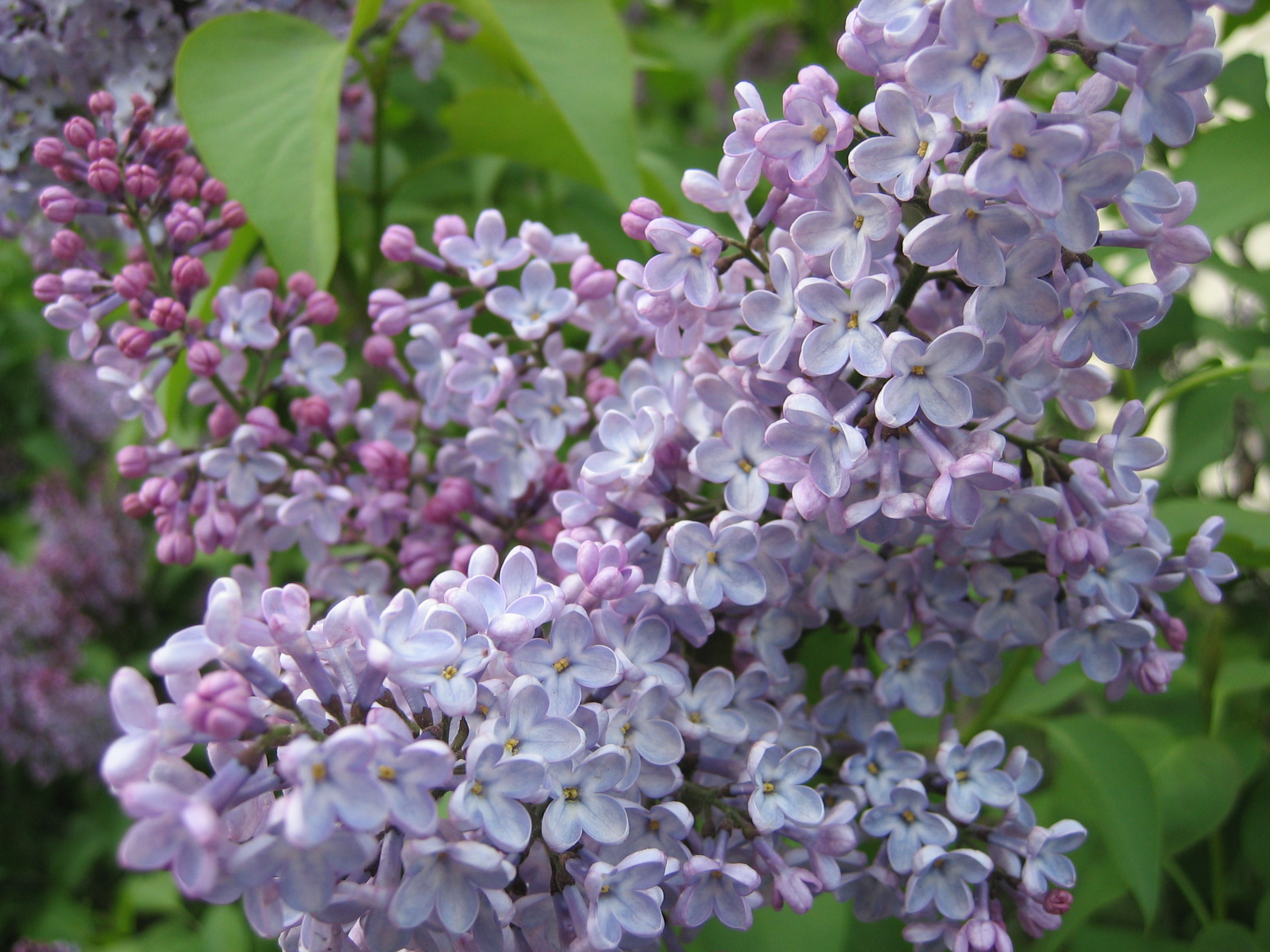
Sample of Syringa vulgaris such as surround the mansion today, descendants of those presumed introduced by Wentworth

The gardens indicated on the Hale map are presumed to extend back to the era of Benning Wentworth. In the absence of any family papers, we cannot know whether or not the governor had any knowledge or interest in the shift in British gardening away from large formal gardens to a new naturalistic landscape style. The shift was in progress in the early eighteenth century. The rectilinear and axial style of his garden suggests not, but one architectural feature hints that he may have been aware of such a shift. This feature was a roof deck.

Above the best bedchamber was a flat roof deck, accessed via a stair from the family wing's secondary bedchamber to a shed- or lean-to shaped roof, that appears as a saw-tooth in the roofline when viewed from the water. Although later roofed over with the gable we see today, the floor of this attic space still shows evidence of its original surface of tar and gravel. When open to the sky, it provided a view over the garden, orchards, farm fields, the back channel, its islands, and out to sea. This view equates with the ideals of the emerging landscape garden movement in Britain, and provides a tantalizing possibility that Wentworth or his guests may have been cognizant of it. At the very least, they could enjoy the view for what it was.

It is the earliest known example of such a roof deck in New England, though evidence of others from later periods exists, as at the circa 1797 Rider Tavern in Charlton, Massachusetts. In a shipbuilding city like Portsmouth, it was probably a simple matter to find workmen familiar with working with tar and hemp cordage, to build and maintain this deck. But, eventually, the harsh New England weather prevailed, and at an unknown date the roof deck was built over with a gabled attic to shed snow and rain. Leakage may account for the deteriorated condition of the wallpaper in the best bedroom immediately below this deck.

We get a general impression of the landscape in the advertisement of the house and land for sale in 1803:

FOR SALE That pleasant, agreeable and well known SEAT, at Little Harbor. The large and spacious MANSION HOUSE, formerly belonging to Gov. Benning Wentworth, deceased – consisting of a variety of elegant and convenient apartments; a large and extensive Garden, – likewise, a beautiful Flower Garden, adjoining the House, both containing all kinds of the best growth of Fruit Trees, Grape Vines, &c. A Wharf with convenient Stores thereon, two large and commodious Barns, Cyder House, and other out and convenient Buildings, with two Wells of excellent water. – The above containing about one hundred acres of Tillage, Mowing and Pasture Land, together with two excellent Orchards, the whole enclosed with a strong and well built stone Wall. The situation is delightful and romantic, commanding a grand prospect of the sea and adjacent country.

It is likely, though not certain, that many of the features in this advertisement dated to Benning Wentworth's era and were maintained through Michael Wentworth's ownership.

Spatial organisation and relationships, architectural trim, social and political cues, and to some degree the landscape organisation, demonstrate that the apparently random mansion follows an intelligible hierarchical arrangement, its unorthodox exterior form notwithstanding.

Today, the house is open to the public in summer, and tours usually start at the kitchen door, giving the visitor an experience more akin to a servant's experience of the house, moving from low-status utilitarian rooms, through higher-status family rooms, to the impressive formal rooms. This is a very different sequence from what must have been experienced by elite visitors who might be entertained in the grand formal rooms, perhaps intimate enough with the governor to be entertained in the family parlor or study, and unlikely to see the many service rooms that supported the governor's life.

== See also ==
- List of National Historic Landmarks in New Hampshire
- National Register of Historic Places listings in Rockingham County, New Hampshire
- List of New Hampshire historical markers (176–200) § 194: Wentworth–Coolidge Mansion
