= MacPheadris–Warner House =

Historic house in New Hampshire, United States

- Warner House
- U.S. National Register of Historic Places
- U.S. National Historic Landmark
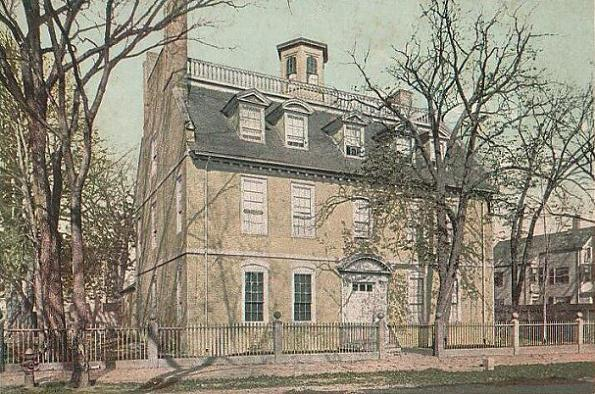

- Location within New Hampshire Location within the United States
- Location: 150 Daniel Street, Portsmouth, New Hampshire
- Coordinates: 43°4′41″N 70°45′18″W
- Built: 1716–1718
- Architect: John Drew
- Architectural style: Early Georgian
- NRHP reference No.: 66000028

Significant dates
- Added to NRHP: October 15, 1966
- Designated NHL: October 9, 1960

The Warner House, formerly known as the MacPheadris–Warner House, is a historic house museum at 150 Daniel Street (corner of Chapel Street) in Portsmouth, New Hampshire, United States. Built 1716–1718, it is the oldest, urban brick house in northern New England, and is one of the finest early-Georgian brick houses in New England. It was declared a National Historic Landmark in 1960, and is listed on the National Register of Historic Places.

== Description ==
The Warner House is a 2 1/2-story brick structure, with walls 15 inches (38 cm) thick laid in Flemish bond. A belt course separates the two main floors, and the slightly overhanging cornice is studded with modillions. It now has a gambrel roof; this is a later modification to what was originally a pair of side gable pitches with a deep valley between them. At the break line in the gambrel there is a low balustrade. The cupola was listed in the original 1716 bill by John Drew, master-builder. The interior of the house follows a typical Georgian four-room plan, with an added kitchen wing in the rear. The walls of the central hall and stairway are decorated with four murals, possibly by Nehemiah Partridge, that are the oldest extant Anglo-American wall murals in the country.

== History ==
The house was built for Capt. Archibald Macpheadris, a Scots-Irish sea captain who settled in Portsmouth. He married Sarah Wentworth, daughter of John Wentworth. Macpheadris died in 1729, and the house passed to his wife and children.

=== Governor's Mansion ===
In 1737, Sarah Wentworth Macpheadris married George Jaffrey, a wealthy Portsmouth merchant and business associate of Archibald Macpheadris. Sarah and her 14-year-old daughter, Mary, moved to the Jaffrey Mansion, a few houses up Daniel Street. Sarah's brother Royal Governor Benning Wentworth of the Province of New Hampshire then occupied the Warner House for nearly 20 years and used it as the Governor's Mansion. Eventually, Benning removed to his country estate in Little Harbor now known as the Wentworth-Coolidge Mansion. Reportedly, he left a few broken windows at the Warner House and never paid his sister rent.

=== Family occupancy ===
Macpheadris's only surviving child was Mary Macpheadris Osborne. In 1760, the recently widowed heiress married Jonathan Warner, a Portsmouth merchant and widower of her deceased cousin, Mary Nelson Warner. Jonathan Warner brought eleven-year-old daughter Mary "Polly" Warner, his only child, to live in the house. The house was remodeled to suit the fashionable tastes of Jonathan Warner. Until 1932, the house remained in the hands of Warner's family descendants. From the 1880s until the late 1920s the descendants used the Warner House as a summer residence.

=== Warner House Association ===
When offered for sale in the early 1930s by descendants, the house was threatened with demolition when an oil company offered to buy the property to erect a gas station. A group of local early preservationists led by Edith Greenough Wendell set out to stop the destruction. In 1931, the Warner House Association was established, and during the Great Depression, the Association was able to accomplish an extraordinary feat and raise the necessary funds ($10,000) to purchase the house in March 1932. A few months later, the historic house museum opened with little to no furnishings. Over time, many of the original family furnishings have returned to the house. Although the early Association originally sought to interpret the property from the Macpheadris era to its original Georgian height (c. 1762), the modern Association details its earliest to its latest days of private ownership up to and including the early Association interpretation.

== See also ==
- List of the oldest buildings in New Hampshire
- List of National Historic Landmarks in New Hampshire
- National Register of Historic Places listings in Rockingham County, New Hampshire
