= John Leavitt =

English-born tailor and church deacon (1608–1691)

- Born: c. 1608; Beverley, East Riding of Yorkshire, England
- Died: November 20, 1691 (aged 82–83); Hingham, Massachusetts Bay Colony, English America
- Occupations: Tailor; public official; church deacon
- Known for: Founding deacon of Old Ship Church
- Spouses: Mary (m. 1636; died 1646) Sarah Gilman (m. 1646)
- Children: 13, including Samuel and Moses
- Relatives: Dudley Leavitt (great-grandson); Josiah Leavitt (great-grandson); Dudley Leavitt Pickman (3rd great-grandson)

John Leavitt (c. 1608 – November 20, 1691) was an English-born tailor, public official, and founding deacon of Old Ship Church in Hingham, Massachusetts, the only remaining 17th-century Puritan meeting house in America and the oldest church in continuous ecclesiastical use in the United States. Hingham's Leavitt Street is named for the early settler, whose descendants have lived in Hingham for centuries.

== Biography ==
Leavitt was born in 1608 in England, in Beverly, Yorkshire. Leavitt first appears in the annals of the Massachusetts Bay Colony in 1634, when he is shown in records of Dorchester, Massachusetts, as having been granted a house lot. Within two years, the early settler had moved to nearby Hingham, where he was granted land in 1636. In his early history of Hingham, attorney Solomon Lincoln recited the oft-told tale of Leavitt's supposed origins:

"The family tradition concerning John Leavitt is that he was an indented apprentice in England," wrote Lincoln in 1827, "and that he absconded from his master and came to this country when nineteen years of age.... He received a grant of land in this town in 1636. His homestead was in Leavitt-street, recently so named, on both sides of the river."

In the same year, Leavitt took the Freeman's Oath of the Massachusetts Bay Colony. In records on file at Boston Leavitt is shown on March 3, 1636, as pledging loyalty to the English Crown. In the early Massachusetts record the early English settler is listed as John Levett, as the tailor apparently spelled his own name for several decades, until it became corrupted later in life.

After moving to Hingham, Leavitt's first wife Mary died, and he subsequently remarried at Hingham on December 16, 1646, Sarah Gilman, daughter of Edward Gilman Sr., a fellow Hingham resident who later removed with his family to Ipswich, Massachusetts, and thence to Exeter, New Hampshire, where the Gilman family became well-known businessmen, statesmen and American patriots. Sarah Gilman's sister Lydia married Daniel Cushing, who became Hingham's town clerk and John Leavitt's lifelong friend and, later, witness to his will.

Leavitt became active in Hingham town affairs, was named a Sergeant in the militia, as well as Deputy to the Massachusetts General Court from 1656–64, a Selectman for the town in 1661 and many subsequent years, and then Deacon of the church, pastored by Rev. Peter Hobart, whose daughter Bathsheba married John Leavitt's son John Jr.

In between his public life and helping raise 13 children, Leavitt embarked on a lifelong pursuit of land, perhaps in recognition of its limited availability in his native England. By 1665, Leavitt and Lieut. John Smith, with whom he frequently collaborated in his real estate dealings, had secured 12 acres (49,000 m^{2}) on the border of Hingham and what is today Cohasset. Living nearby Leavitt's house lot in today's Hingham Center, located at some distance from the main village, was his friend Nathaniel Baker, who also often purchased real estate with Leavitt. The two men apparently enjoyed particularly warm relations with the local Indians. Deacon John Leavitt assisted in the burial of a local Indian chief, and Baker was fined 20 shillings for "entertaining an Indian or Indians contrary to a Town order."

Nearby Leavitt's home described as 'over the Delaware' (River) was the so-called Great Rock, an enormous boulder subsequently blown up in the nineteenth century for building material. Onto its granite face was incised, by an early settler, a large inscription noting the accomplishments of Hingham's earliest settlers. The inscription read:

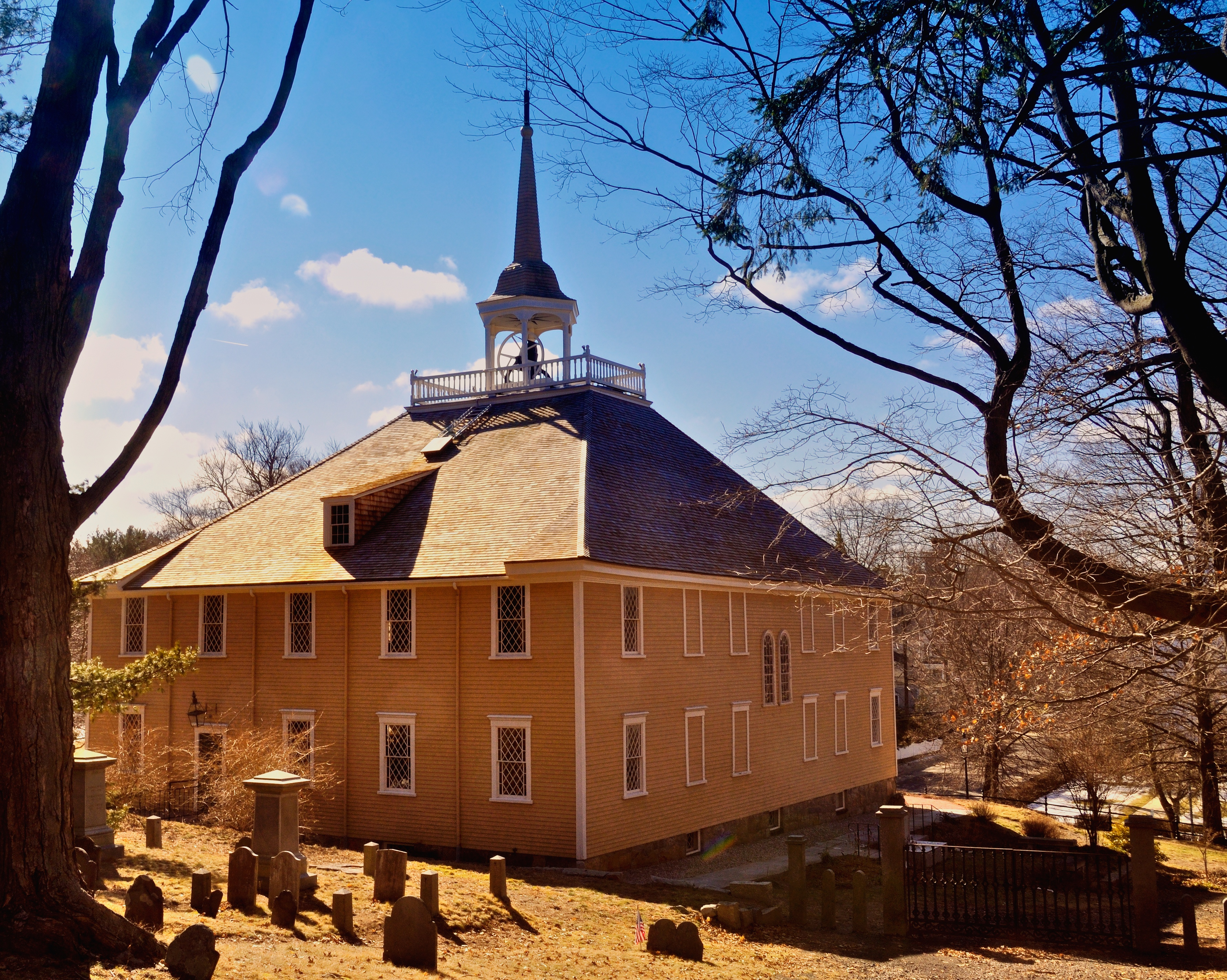
Exterior photograph of the Old Ship Church, February 2009

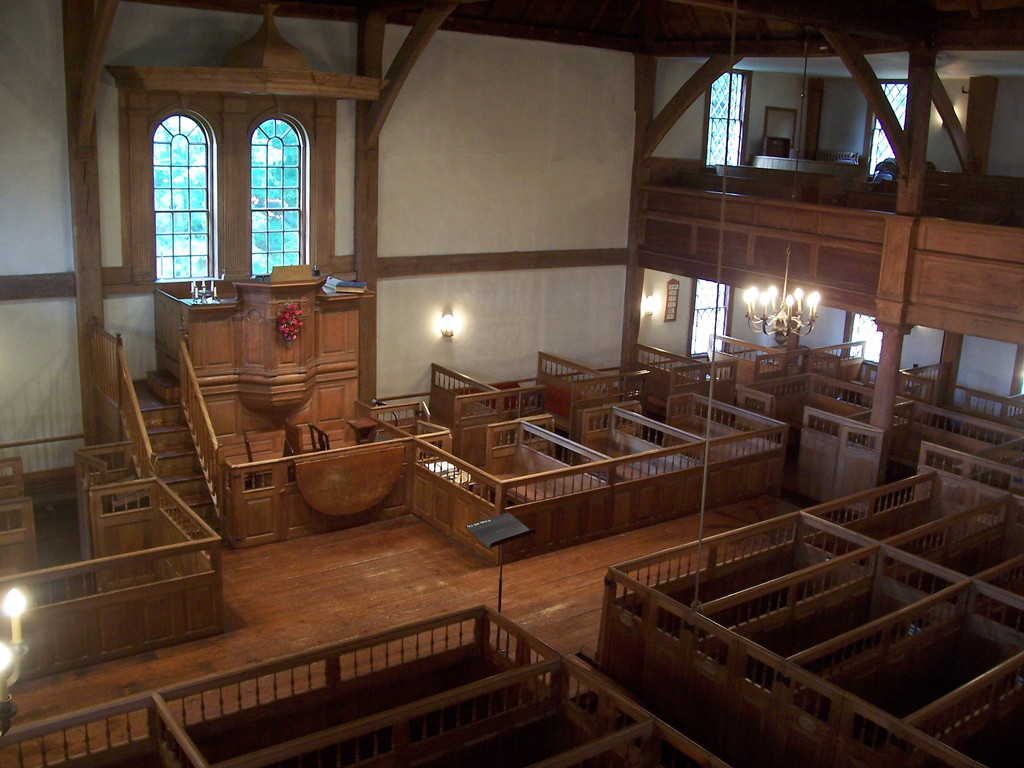
Interior of the Old Ship Church. Original seating chart from the 1680s in frame on wall beside upstairs window

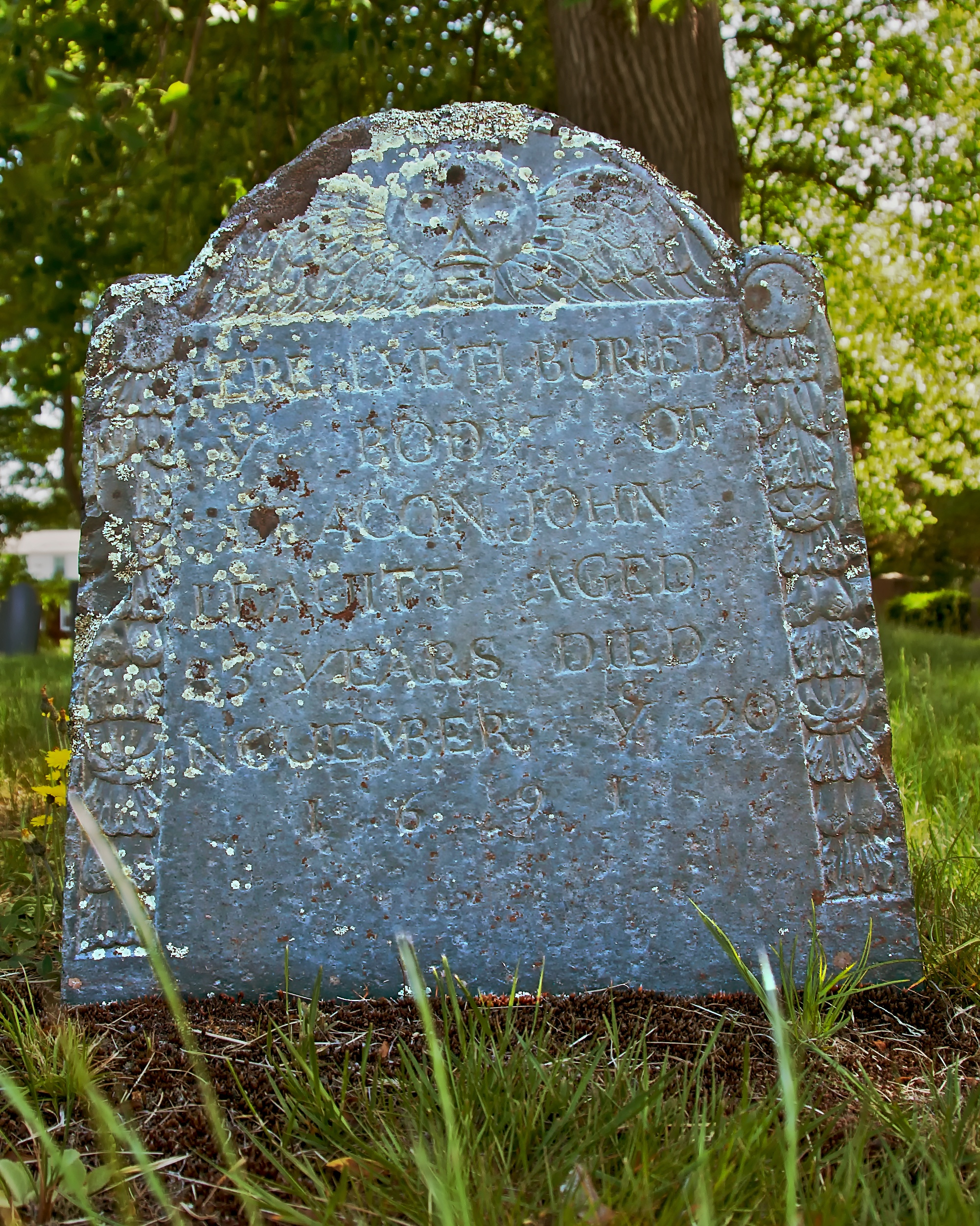
Here Lyeth Buried Ye Body of Deacon John Leavitt, Aged 83 Years, Died November Ye 20, 1691

"When wild in wood the naked savage ran,
Lazell, Low, Loring, Lane, Lewis, Lincoln,
Hersey, Leavitt, Jacobs, King, Jones and Sprague,
Stemmed the wild torrent of a barbarous age,
And were the first invaders of this country,
From the Island of Great Britain, in 1635."

In keeping with the spirit of the inscription, and despite his own warm relations with the local Native American tribe, John Leavitt bought enormous tracts of land from the local Indians, for a meager outlay of cash. Leavitt made several such purchases during his lifetime, most lying in the so-called 'Narragansett country,' in the region south of Hingham near the Massachusetts-Rhode Island border. One such tract, fifteen-miles (24 km)-square, was purchased by Leavitt and his friends Capt. Joshua Hobart (twin brother of Rev. Peter) and Lieut. John Smith. In many such deeds, John Leavitt the settler is called 'John Levet' or sometimes 'John Levett' or even 'John Levit,' but rarely John Leavitt.

By May 3, 1680, when a town meeting was held to decide whether a new meeting house would be built upon the site of the old, John Leavitt was Deacon of the church, and one of the chief proponents for the new building. Leavitt's speeches on the need for a new sanctuary ultimately proved persuasive. The Old Ship Church, so-called because the hammerbeam roof construction recalled that of an upside-down ship's hull, was completed July 26, 1681, when the townspeople of Hingham gathered on the knoll bordering on Bachelor's Row (now Main Street) to watch the raising of the frame of the new building.

Observing the festivities was Deacon John Leavitt, aged seventy-three, who had argued the need for the new wooden edifice. The Deacon's pew remains set aside today in the building, over 300 years later. Tailor John Leavitt died at Hingham November 20, 1691, at age 83. His voluminous will records the disposition of the extensive lands accumulated during his lifetime, as well as documenting the family and social connections that sustained him in the New World. The executors of Leavitt's estate, named in his will, were his friend and brother-in-law Daniel Cushing Sr., Hingham's longtime town clerk, Capt. John Smith, Capt. John Jacob, Lieut. Matthew Cushing, and Daniel Cushing Jr.

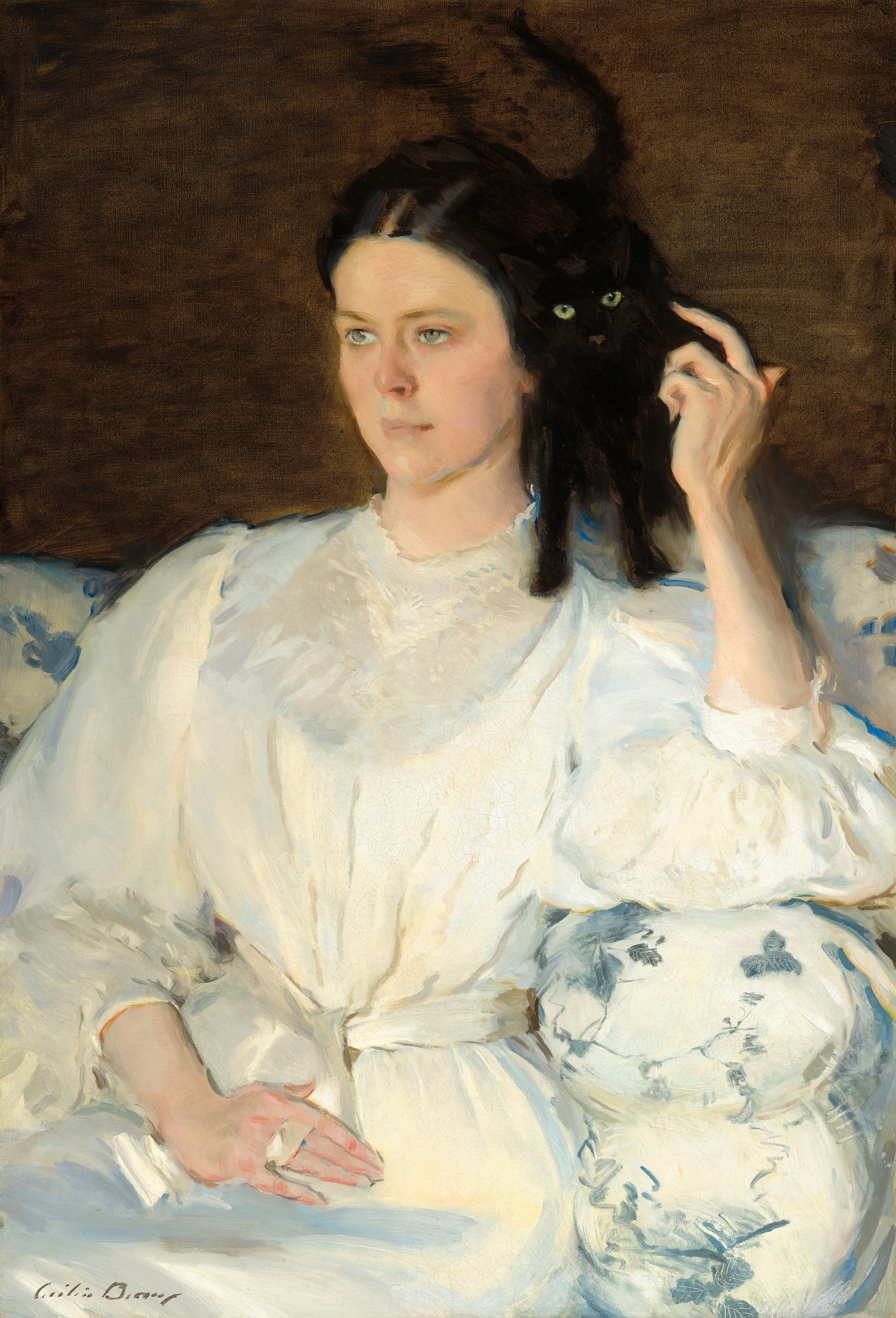
Sita and Sarita (Jeune Fille au Chat). Portrait of Sarah Allibone Leavitt by Cecilia Beaux, 1893–1894. Collection of the Musée d'Orsay, Paris

Leavitt's widow, Sarah (Gilman) Leavitt, died in Hingham at the home of her brother-in-law Daniel Cushing on May 26, 1700. Two of John Leavitt's sons, Samuel and Moses, later moved to Exeter, New Hampshire. John's son Israel, bearing another Old Testament name, married Lydia Jackson of the Plymouth Colony, where her grandfather Nathaniel Morton, the colony's Secretary and nephew of Governor William Bradford, was first to publish a list of signers of the Mayflower Compact, as well recording the celebration of the first Thanksgiving. Each year The Wall Street Journal carries an excerpt from Morton's New England's Memorial – printed at Cambridge in 1669, the first history book printed in America – limning the details of the first Thanksgiving.

The daughters of John Leavitt similarly left their mark. Hannah Leavitt married as her second husband Capt. Joseph Estabrook of Lexington, Massachusetts. John's daughter Sarah married as her second husband Samuel Howe—their descendants established the Wayside Inn in Sudbury, Massachusetts, celebrated in Henry Wadsworth Longfellow's Tales of a Wayside Inn.

Among the couple's other descendants on the continent they helped pioneer are Salem clipper ship owner, Massachusetts legislator and founder of the Peabody Essex Museum Dudley Leavitt Pickman; former Supreme Court Justice Sandra Day O'Connor; Philadelphia society portraitist Cecilia Beaux; architect Richard Morris Hunt, painter William Morris Hunt and brother Leavitt Hunt, attorney and photography pioneer; deaf Harvard astronomy wunderkind Henrietta Swan Leavitt; former Assistant Secretary of Defense during the Cuban Missile Crisis Roswell Leavitt Gilpatric; the abolitionist brothers Roger Hooker Leavitt, Joshua Leavitt and Hart Leavitt; New Hampshire native Dudley Leavitt, publisher of Leavitt's Farmers Almanack, the second oldest in the nation; and Hartford Mayor and father of the U. S. Dept. of Agriculture Henry Leavitt Ellsworth.

Deacon Leavitt's descendants also include writer Stephen King; contemporary sculptor Michael Leavitt (artist); former United States Secretary of Health and Human Services Mike Leavitt; New York City financier David Leavitt, namesake of Chicago's Leavitt Street for his role in rescuing nearly bankrupt Illinois and Michigan Canal; Hon. John Leavitt Stevens, U. S. State Dept. Minister to the Kingdom of Hawai'i, forced to resign in 1893 when accused of conspiring to overthrow Queen Lili'uokalani; Forest Ranger and later U.S. Congressman Scott Leavitt of Montana; and former Utah governor, U.S. Ambassador to China and Singapore Jon Huntsman, Jr. and Major League Baseball pitcher Ron Darling. Among John Leavitt's English descendants was Admiral of the Fleet Sir Alfred Dudley Pickman Pound, a torpedo expert who masterminded Britain's victory in the Battle of the Atlantic (1939–1945).

Other descendants of the Deacon became German citizens. David Leavitt Jr., son of the New York banker, moved to Dresden, where daughter Louise Walcott Leavitt married Baron Franz Oswald Trützschler von Falkenstein. Her sister Helen Hudson Leavitt married Baron Adolf von Strahlenheim. Hugh Toler Leavitt, brother of the Baronesses, became a German Army officer.

Deacon Leavitt's direct descendants were among the first settlers on the Letang Peninsula, an area south of the town of St. George, New Brunswick, Canada. His fourth great-grandsons, Elisha and David Leavitt were, according to family legend, shipwrecked on their voyage from Maine to Saint John, New Brunswick and came ashore in Lepreau, New Brunswick. After working in a lumber mill in Lepreau, the brothers made their way to Mascarene, New Brunswick. They worked at McKenzie's Shipyard. Elisha left the shipyard to work for McVicar's Lumber Camp. He was paid in land in the area known as Letang. He rented land to people who cleared land in lieu of paying rent. Elisha farmed and fished. He operated a limekiln and a lobster factory. He also invested in lumber land, purchasing over six hundred acres in 1858, known as the Glebe. He later built a home there, on higher ground. His brother David chose land and farmed and fished in the area that would become known as Leavitt's Head. Both brothers are buried in a family plot on David's land. Their descendants hold reunions regularly at Leavitt's Head.

John Leavitt's descendants have reunited periodically at Hingham throughout the years.
