= Dudley Leavitt =

Dudley Leavitt may refer to:

- Dudley Leavitt (minister), (1720-1762) Congregational minister
- Dudley Leavitt (Mormon pioneer), (1830-1908) early pioneer of the Church of Jesus Christ of Latter-day Saints
- Dudley Leavitt (publisher), (1772-1851) American publisher
