= Sam Leavitt =

Sam or Samuel Leavitt may refer to:

- Sam Leavitt (American football) (born 2004)
- Sam Leavitt (cinematographer) (1904–1984), American cinematographer
- Samuel Leavitt (1641–1707), American settler
