= Josiah Leavitt =

American physician and inventor (1744–1804)

- Born: October 21, 1744; Hingham, Province of Massachusetts Bay, British America
- Died: February 26, 1804 (aged 59); Boston, Massachusetts, U.S.
- Education: Harvard College
- Occupations: Physician; inventor
- Spouse: Azubah Osgood (m. 1778)
- Children: 1
- Relatives: John Leavitt (paternal great-grandfather)

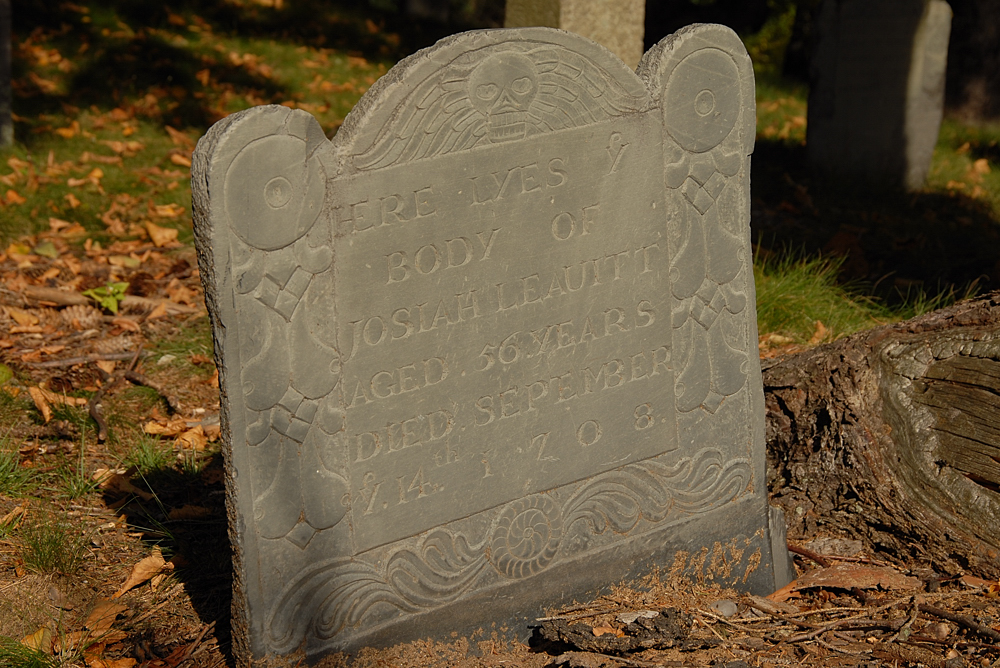
Tombstone of Josiah Leavitt, grandfather of Dr. Josiah Leavitt, organ builder. Old Hingham Burying Ground, Hingham, Massachusetts.

Josiah Leavitt (October 21, 1744 – February 26, 1804) was an early Massachusetts physician and inventor. Possessed of an early love for mechanical movements and for music, Leavitt eventually gave up his medical practice and moved to Boston, where he became one of the earliest manufacturers of pipe organs in the United States.

== Early life ==
Josiah Leavitt was born October 21, 1744, in Hingham, in what was then the Province of Massachusetts Bay. He was the son of Hezekiah Leavitt (1697–1768), and his second wife Grace (née Hatch; 1699–1750). Hezekiah was a prosperous Hingham merchant who owned one of the town's largest warehouses on the harbor, a large wharf and a share of the town's gristmill and fisheries business. Josiah Leavitt's father was a close friend and business associate of Rev. Ebenezer Gay, third minister of Old Ship Church, Hingham's Meetinghouse.

Josiah's ancestry was English, with traces back to early English colonialists in Massachusetts, with his paternal great-grandfather, John Leavitt, immigrating to Hingham in the 1630s from Yorkshire, England, and where he subsequently became a prominent tailor, public official, and founding deacon of the Old Ship Church. On Josiah's mother's side, her family belonged to another well-established colonial family in New England.

Following his education at Harvard College, Josiah became a practicing physician at Hingham. On the side, the mechanically-inclined Leavitt tinkered with inventions and mechanical movements. One of the first products of Leavitt's sideline was a large clock, manufactured in 1772–73, which was subsequently hung in a dormer window on the southwesterly slope of the roof of Old Ship Church, so that the clock's dial could be seen by townspeople. Leavitt's clock, the first built in Hingham, was probably the only clock he ever built. Where Leavitt garnered his expertise is unknown, although contemporaries noted his mechanical aptitude, as well as the fact that his sister Hannah was married to Hingham watchmaker Joseph Lovis.

In 1774, Leavitt built a large Colonial clapboard home. at 93 Main Street, two blocks from the Meetinghouse. Shortly afterwards, Leavitt moved to Sterling, Massachusetts, where he built another Colonial home, and then a few years later to Boston, where he gave up his medical practice, and began manufacturing organs.

== Leavitt embarks on a new career ==
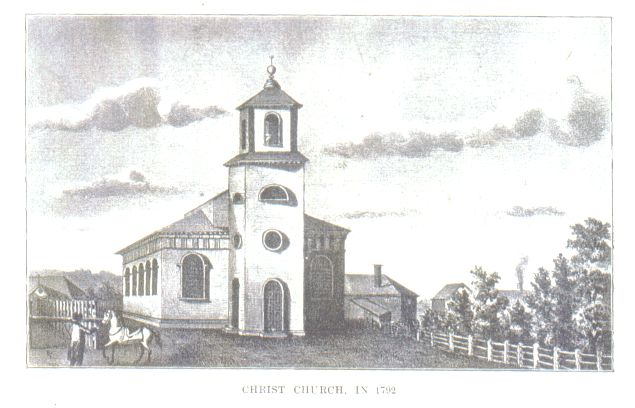
Christ Church, Cambridge, Massachusetts, 1792. English-made organ damaged by American Revolutionary forces, later repaired by Josiah Leavitt

Because of his musical interests, Leavitt had corresponded with organ builder Bromfield, and was also acquainted with craftsman Johnston, who died in 1768. Shortly afterwards, Leavitt himself relocated to Boston.

In Boston, Leavitt set about creating a workshop where he and several assistants began building organs for New England churches. On February 8, 1792, an advertisement appeared in The Columbian Centinel announcing that Leavitt had finished an organ destined for the Universalist Religious Society of Boston."

By the following November, Leavitt had completed a new instrument for the Congregationalist Meetinghouse in Worthington, Connecticut. He was soon building other organs to satisfy the burgeoning demand. The arrival of one of Leavitt's creation at the Worthington meeting house was an event of enough import that The Hartford Courant ran a story about it:

Other churches, now freed from the old Puritan strictures against musical instrument accompaniment, were soon ordering Leavitt's organs. The church of Newburyport, Massachusetts, in 1794 set up Leavitt's creation in the gallery of the meeting house, and subsequently showed off its acquisition. "This organ (which is certainly the most elegant of any in New England", noted the town's newspaper the Morning Star, "is about fifteen feet high, ten feet in breadth, and seven feet from front to rear, was built by Dr. Josiah Leavitt, an ingenious organ builder of Boston, for whose benefit there will be a contribution after service is over."

Among other churches which ordered Leavitt organs were the Episcopal church of Dedham, Massachusetts, and TK. His business, though, was still spotty enough that he sometimes advertised his half-completed instruments for sale in regional newspapers.

== Later life and legacy ==
"It was a particular accomplishment that Josiah Leavitt, a Congregationalist, was able to place instruments in dissenting churches", writes Orpha Caroline Ochse in The History of the Organ in the United States. "Many of these churches were still violently opposed to the use of the organ, an attitude that some of them retained through much of the next century."

Leavitt also trained other later organ builders. Among his pupils were William M. Goodrich, a native of Templeton, Massachusetts, born in 1777. Goodrich himself became an active organ-builder in Boston beginning in 1803. It was Goodrich whom many consider the first advanced American organ manufacturer. In addition to sending out his elegant creations to churches throughout the region, Goodrich trained a number of other makers, including Thomas Appleton, as well as his own brother Ebenezer Goodrich, who later went into business for himself.

Josiah Leavitt died at his Boston home on February 26, 1804. The golden age of American organ building was still ahead, as New England's increasing prosperity and growing know-how, fostered in part by the early physician turned manufacturer, gave rise to such accomplished organ builders as Hook & Hastings, and the ateliers of Erben, Jardine, and Roosevelt, many of which thrived in Boston and its vicinity, and whose trade was fueled in part by the profits of the large trading firms of Salem and the state capitol.

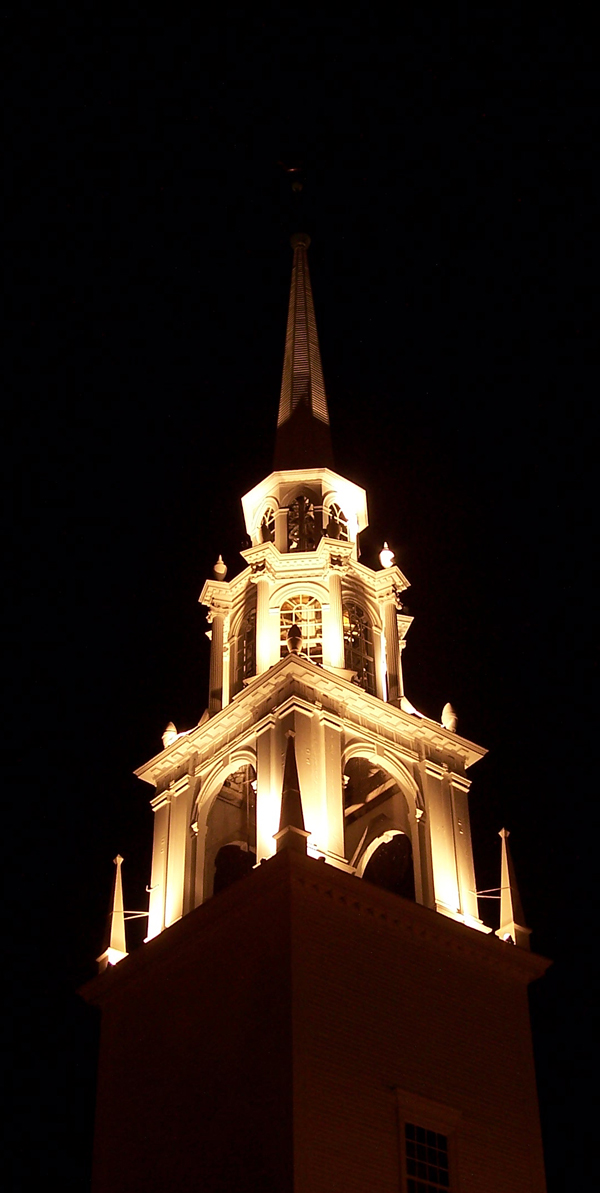
Meetinghouse, Newburyport, Massachusetts. Built for previous meetinghouse, Josiah Leavitt's organ moved into new meetinghouse in 1801. Later replaced by more elaborate organ.

Josiah Leavitt was buried at Hingham, Massachusetts. Leavitt's second wife Azubah died at Boston in November 1803 at age 44. The Hingham meeting house Old Ship Church did not purchase an organ until 1869. Prior to that the congregants sang unaccompanied.

== See also ==
- John Leavitt
- List of pipe organ builders
- Old Ship Church
- E. and G. G. Hook Organ
- Pipe organs
