= Mary Nichols =

Mary Nichols may refer to:

- Mary D. Nichols (born 1945), chairwoman of the California Air Resources Board
- Mary Pickering Nichols (1829–1915), American translator of German literature
- Mary Nichols (politician) (born 1949), member of the Missouri House of Representatives
- Mary Ann Nichols (1845–1888), one of the Whitechapel murder victims
- Mary Gove Nichols (1810–1884), American woman's rights and health reform advocate, and writer
