= Moses Leavitt =

New Hampshire surveyor (1650–1730)

- Born: August 12, 1650; Hingham, Massachusetts Bay Colony, English America
- Died: June 17, 1730 (aged 79); Exeter, Province of New Hampshire, British America
- Occupations: Surveyor; landowner; militia officer; church deacon; politician
- Spouse: Dorothy Dudley (m. 1681)
- Children: 12
- Parent: John Leavitt (father)
- Relatives: Samuel Leavitt (brother); Dudley Leavitt (grandson); Dudley Leavitt Pickman (2nd great-grandson)
- Military career
- Branch: New Hampshire Militia
- Conflicts: King Philip's War; French and Indian Wars; King William's War; Queen Anne's War

Moses Leavitt (August 12, 1650 – June 17, 1730) was a New Hampsire surveyor, landowner, militia officer, church deacon, and politician in Exeter, New Hampshire. A prominenet local figure in the late 17th and early 18th centuries, he fought in King Philip's War, the French and Indian Wars, and later held numerous public offices in his career, including Exeter Selectman, Deputy, State Senator, and Moderator of the New Hampshire General Court.

He was the ancestor of several notable Leavitt descendants, including the well-known Meredith, New Hampshire, teacher and almanac maker Dudley Leavitt.

== Biography ==
Leavitt was born at Hingham, Massachusetts, on August 12, 1650, the son of John Leavitt, a Puritan tailor who left England and settled in Dorchester (part of today's Boston), before moving on several years later to Hingham, several miles south of Boston, where he married as his second wife Sarah Gilman, daughter of Edward Gilman Sr., a fellow Hingham settler who eventually moved on to Exeter. Although granted land at Exeter, John Leavitt never chose to move north. Instead, his son Samuel by his first wife, and son Moses (by his wife Sarah Gilman) eventually moved to Exeter, where they settled as early as 1677, and the two half-brothers first appeared on the town's tax roll in 1680. Earlier, both brothers had taken 'ye oath of Allegiance to his majestie & fidelitie to ye contrey" at Exeter on November 30, 1677. New Hampshire records show that "Moses Levett" and "Samuel Levett" received credit in 1676 in Exeter for their service in King Philip's War.

Moses Leavitt was a surveyor by trade, and early became one of Exeter's leading citizens. When he was thirty-one years old, he married Dorothy Dudley, daughter of Rev. Samuel Dudley, Exeter's minister and the son of Governor Thomas Dudley of the Massachusetts Bay Colony. By the time of his marriage on October 26, 1681, Leavitt was already deeply involved in town affairs, and in surveying and purchasing local land. In 1682 Leavitt first served as an Exeter selectman, an office he held several times during his lifetime. Leavitt was an early signer of an appeal to the King in England to arbitrate the claims of the Masonian proprietors, who were asserting ownership rights to lands claimed by early settlers. Like many legislators, Leavitt concerned himself with matters big and small. In 1700 delegate Leavitt brought a vote from the House of Representatives to the Council of New Hampshire concerning Richard Hilton's ferry on the Squamscott River and his proposed charges on passengers – both man and horse.

A subsequent communiqué in July 1708, signed by Leavitt – and on file at London's Whitehall – was addressed to Her Majesty the Queen from the "Justices, Officers of the Militia, Merchants, etc. of New Hampshire" and was directed "in favour of Governor Dudley."

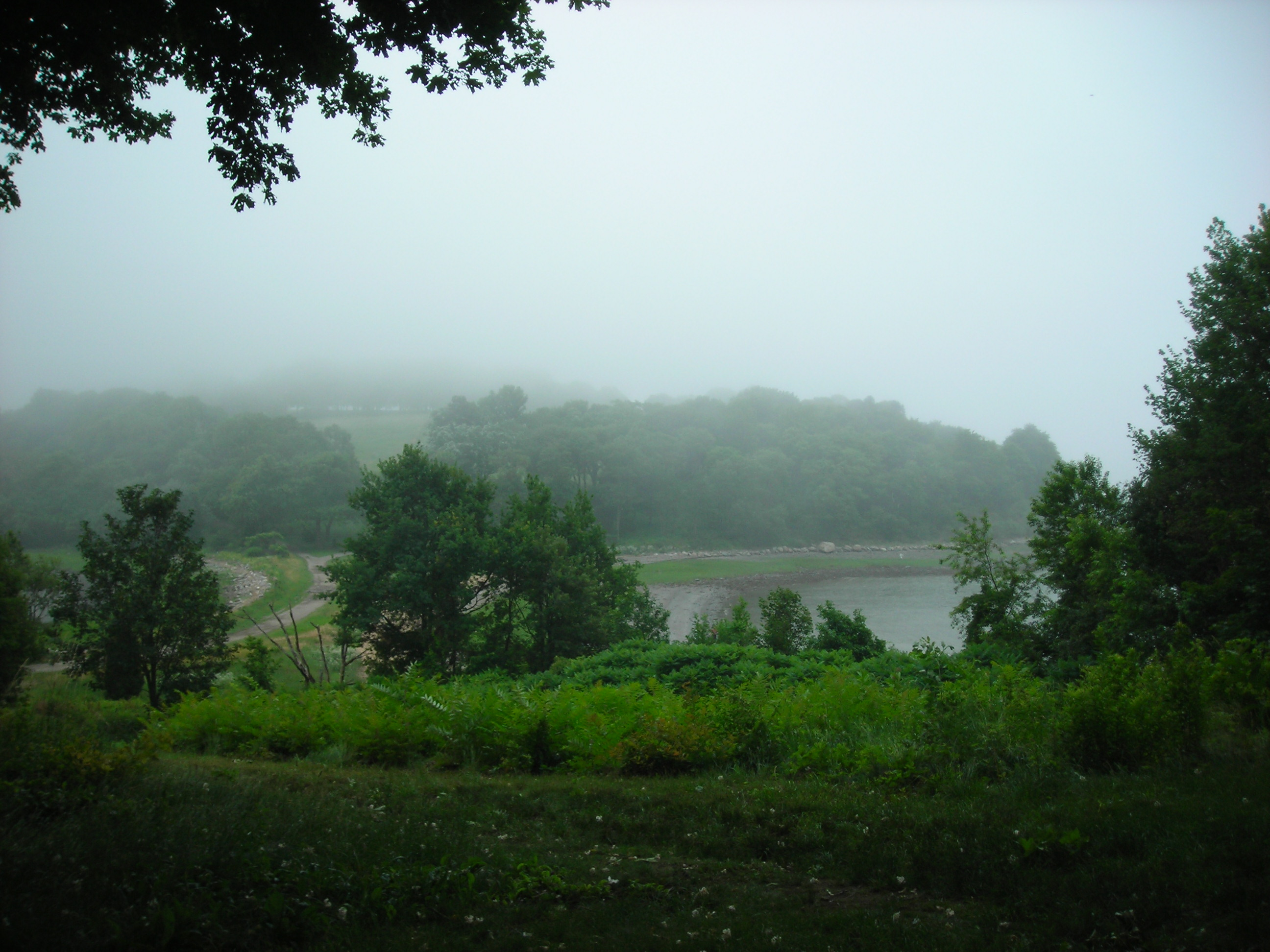
View of Hingham, Massachusetts, near the harbor.

Leavitt first served as Deputy to the colony's General Court in 1692, a position he filled several times over subsequent years. For seven years he held the office of Moderator of the province's General Court, and he also served as a State Senator. Leavitt was appointed in 1698 to a committee of Exeter's First Church to handle the vexing question of where congregants should be seated in the sanctuary – seating being determined by social rank. Deacon Leavitt and Kinsley Hall were first given the choice pews, allowing other congregants to then be accommodated.

Leavitt and the former Dorothy Dudley had twelve children, including sons John and Dudley, and daughter Dorothy. Two of Moses Leavitt's children married Gilman cousins – daughter Hannah, married twice, both times to Gilmans; and Joseph, married to Sarah Gilman. Moses Leavitt died on June 17, 1730, "being aged and feeble", as he noted in his will. (His half-brother Lieut. Samuel Leavitt predeceased him, having died at Exeter in 1707). Moses's family continued to live in the Exeter area for many subsequent generations; his descendants include the noted New Hampshire almanac maker Dudley Leavitt, and the early Salem, Massachusetts, minister Rev. Dudley Leavitt, for whom Salem's Leavitt Street was named.

Following the death of Rev. Samuel Dudley, the early Exeter minister's third wife lived at the home of her son-in-law Moses Leavitt – a courtesy for which the Dudley family bequeathed Leavitt a 50-acre (200,000 m^{2}) plot of land in Exeter. The 1702 conveyance of Dudley land to Leavitt was the last known mention of Rev. Samuel Dudley's third wife, the former Elizabeth Smith. Leavitt's descendants continued to live on the former Dudley family tract for many years, as well as on the extensive grants of land Moses received. The Leavitt family of Exeter played a prominent role in New Hampshire history for many years following the death of its first two New Hampshire representatives. Descendants of both Moses and Samuel Leavitt dispersed throughout New Hampshire in subsequent centuries.

== See also ==
- Thomas Dudley
- Dudley Leavitt (publisher)
- Dudley Leavitt (minister)
- John Leavitt
- Samuel Leavitt
- Dudley Leavitt Pickman
- Dudley Leavitt (Mormon pioneer)
