= Richard Saltonstall Rogers =

American merchant and businessman

- Born: January 13, 1790; Salem, Massachusetts
- Died: June 11, 1873 (aged 83); Salem, Massachusetts
- Resting place: Harmony Grove Cemetery, Salem, Massachusetts
- Education: Phillips Exeter Academy
- Political party: Whig
- Opponent: Nathaniel Hawthorne

Richard Saltonstall Rogers (January 13, 1790 – June 11, 1873) was an early American shipping merchant and was possibly the inspiration for a character in Nathaniel Hawthorne's The Scarlet Letter.

== Early life ==
Rogers was born on January 13, 1790, in Salem, Massachusetts. He was a son of Abigail (née Dodge) Rogers and Nathaniel Rogers. He was educated at Phillips Exeter Academy, from which he graduated in the year 1800.

As a young man, he began to deal in business. Using the influence of his oldest brother, Nathaniel Leverett Rogers, who married the daughter of a prominent businessman in Salem, he acquired large amounts of cargo to be shipped to Russia. He spent several years in Russia, and dealt with the management of the affairs of his sister-in-law's family.

== Career ==
In 1816, he served as the supercargo of the ship Friendship, owned by Waite and Pierce, his sister-in-law's father's company. He traveled to Lisbon, Portugal, and Kolkata, India, along with several other destinations. Following his time on the Friendship, he embarked on one journey upon the Tartar. He then partnered with Nathaniel Rogers and his second oldest brother, John Wittingham Rogers, to form the Rogers Brothers company. Their company employed the ships the Tybee, Clay, Grotius, Augustus, Quill, and Charles Daggett. The brothers pioneered the Zanzibar and New Holland trades, and had their ships collectively travel over 120 times around Cape Horn and Cape of Good Hope. Later in life, he served as supercargo on the ship the Ianthe, and worked with his brother-in-law, W.D. Pickman.

=== Political career ===
Rogers was, at certain points of his life, a member of the Common Council of Salem and the Legislature. He however disliked the methods of his colleagues. He was a Whig, and an enemy of the Democratic-Republican, Nathaniel Hawthorne, and was involved with Hawthorne's removal from the Boston Custom House. Hawthorne, in a letter to Henry Wadsworth Longfellow, promised to "immolate" Rogers, along with several other political opponents, if he were successfully removed from his office. It has been suggested that Roger Chillingworth, a character in Hawthorne's novel The Scarlet Letter, was based on Rogers.

== Personal life ==
On May 14, 1822, Rogers married Sarah Crowninshield Rogers, daughter of U.S. Representative Jacob Crowninshield and Sally (née Gardner) Crowninshield. They had five sons and a daughter:

- William Crowninshield Rogers (1823–1888), who married Mary Ingersoll Bowditch, daughter of Nathaniel Ingersoll Bowditch, in 1871.
- Richard Denison Rogers (b. 1824), who married Martha Endicott Peabody in 1851.
- Jacob Crowninshield Rogers (b. 1828), who married Elizabeth Putnam Peabody.
- George Rogers, who died young.
- Arthur Saltonstall Rogers (b. 1834), who married Annie Rodman Nichols in 1869.
- Sarah Elizabeth Rogers, who died young.

After her death in 1835, he married Elizabeth Leavitt Pickman Rogers, daughter of Massachusetts State Senator Dudley Leavitt Pickman, on March 17, 1847, with whom he had:

- Dudley Pickering Rogers (1848–1873), who graduated from Harvard College in 1869; he died in New York City.
- George Willoughby Rogers (b. 1850), a "man of leisure" who died of consumption in Salem; he married Josephine Frances Lord.
- Elizabeth Pickman Rogers (b. 1853), who married Alfred John Pound, an English barrister.

Rogers died on June 11, 1873, in Salem, at the age of 83. He is buried at Harmony Grove Cemetery in Salem.

=== Descendants ===
Through his daughter Elizabeth, he was the grandfather of Sir Dudley Pound, a senior British Admiral during World War II.
