= Mary Pickering =

Mary Pickering may refer to:

- Evelyn De Morgan (Mary Evelyn Pickering, 1855–1919), English painter
- Mary Pickering Nichols (1829–1915), American translator of German literature
