= Dudley Leavitt (minister) =

New Hampshire minister (1720–1762)

The Reverend Dudley Leavitt
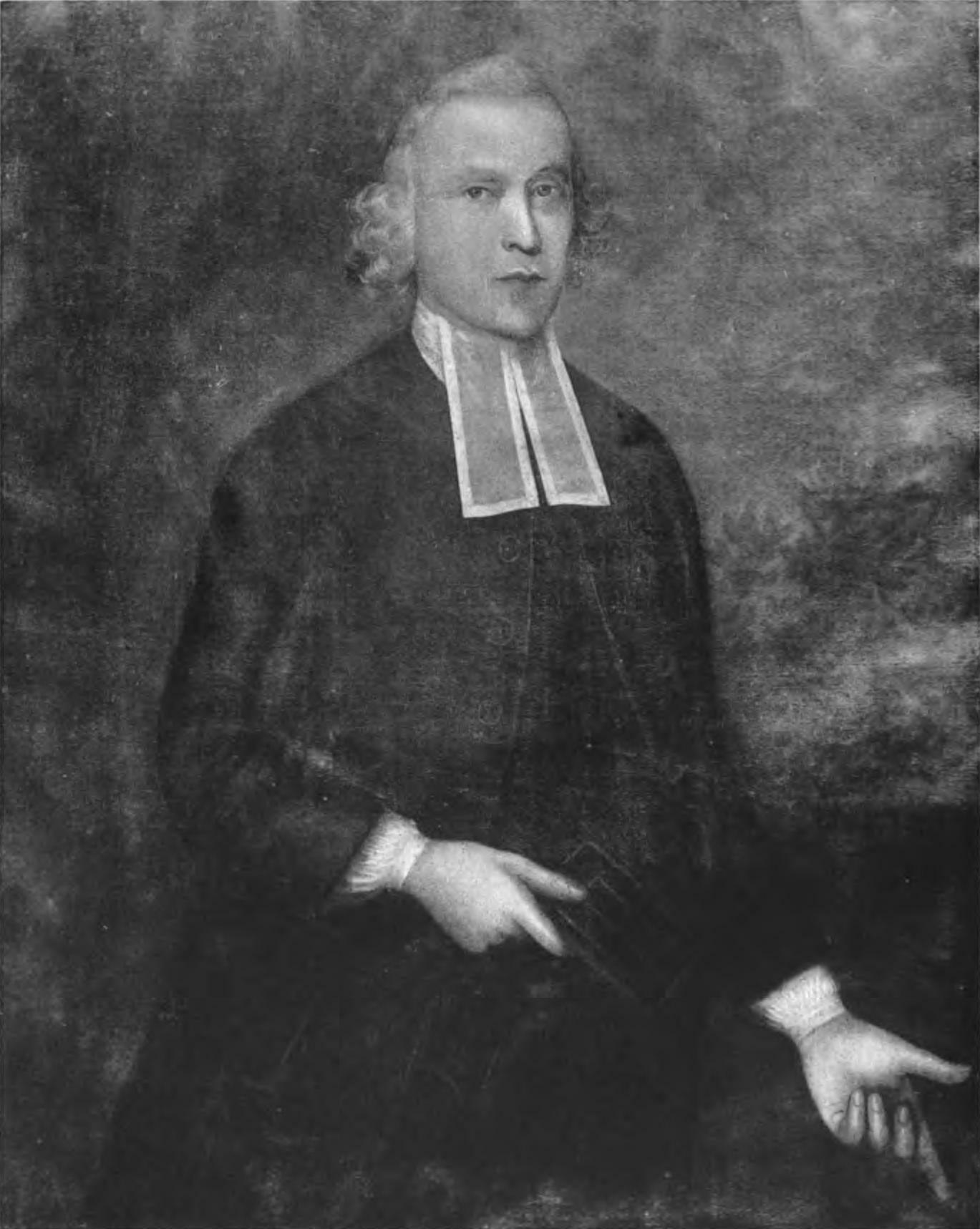
- Portrait by Joseph Badger
- Born: c. 1720; Exeter, Province of New Hampshire, British America
- Died: February 7, 1762 (aged 41–42); Salem, Province of Massachusetts Bay, British America
- Education: Harvard College
- Spouse: Mary Pickering (m. 1751)
- Children: 4
- Relatives: John Leavitt (paternal great-grandfather); Samuel Leavitt (maternal grandfather); Moses Leavitt (paternal grandfather); Timothy Pickering (brother-in-law); Dudley Leavitt Pickman (grandson)

Dudley Leavitt (c. 1720 – February 7, 1762) was a colonial American Congregational minister in colonial Massachusetts. Born in Exeter, New Hampshire, he graduated from Harvard College in 1739 and briefly pastored in his hometown before being called to Salem, Massachusetts. In 1745, he became the pastor of Salem's Third Church (later the Tabernacle Church), leading a prominent "New Light" revivalist congregation during the First Great Awakening until his death. Through his marriage to Mary Pickering, he was the brother-in-law of Revolutionary War leader and Cabinet officer Timothy Pickering.

Following Leavitt's death at age 42, his congregation elected to christen itself 'The Church of Which the Rev. Dudley Leavitt was late Pastor' after the charismatic preacher. Leavitt Street in Salem is named after him.

== Life and work ==
Leavitt was born in Exeter, New Hampshire, in 1720 to a family with Puritan roots going back to the Massachusetts Bay Colony. Leavitt's parents were Moses Leavitt Jr. of Exeter and his wife Sarah (née Leavitt) Leavitt. Educated at Harvard College, where he graduated at age 19 in 1739, Dudley Leavitt was first ordained pastor of Exeter's church in 1743, where he served for two years. On October 23, 1745, he was ordained second minister of a splinter church of First Church in Salem. (The congregation had followed Rev. Samuel Fisk from the church a decade prior to Leavitt's arrival, and although informally known as the Third Church, the congregation continued to insist on calling itself the First Church.)

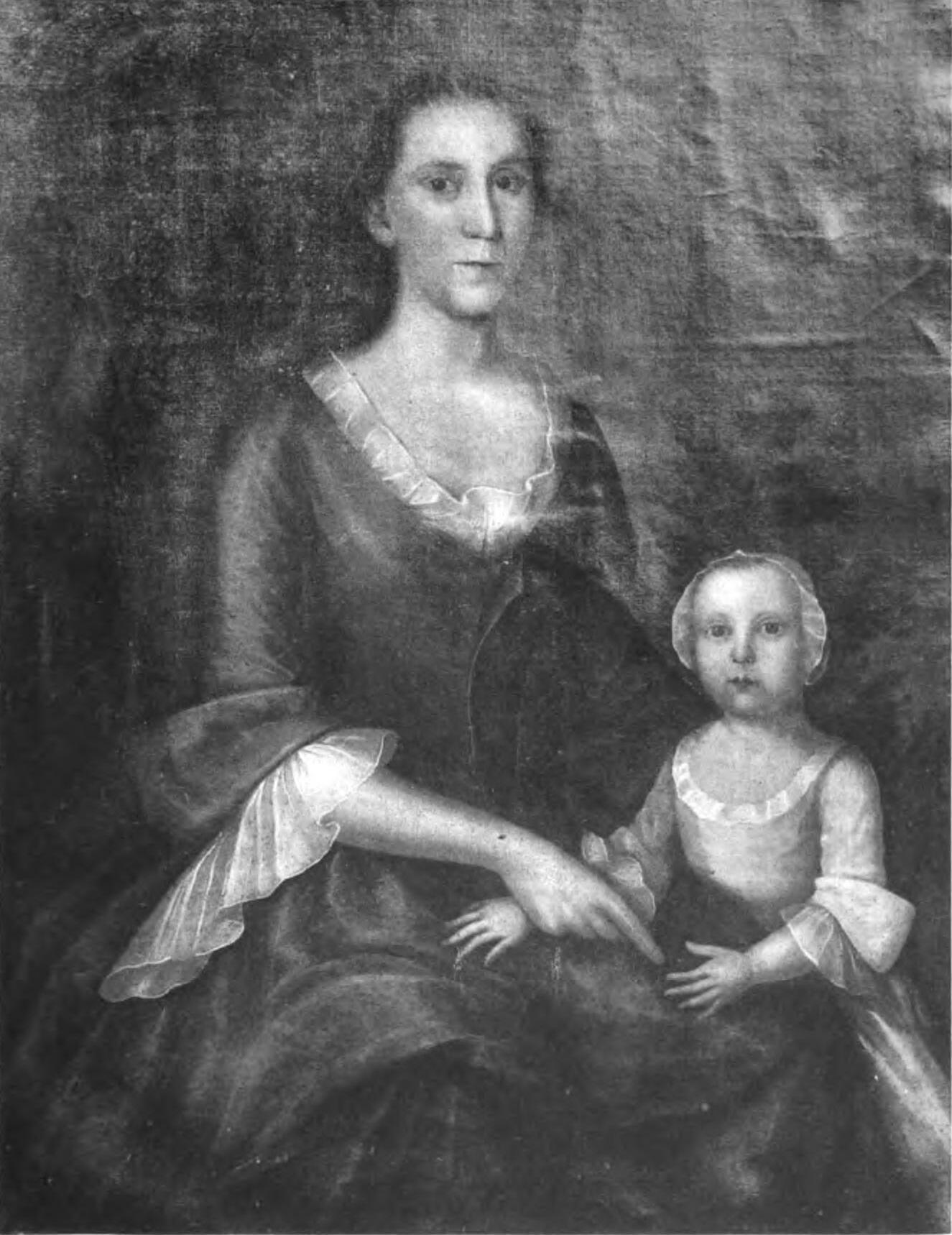
Mary Pickering Leavitt, portrait by Joseph Badger

On September 21, 1751, the young minister married Mary Pickering of Salem, born at Salem's Pickering House, the daughter of Deacon Timothy Pickering and sister of Revolutionary War patriot Timothy Pickering. Three years after his marriage Dudley Leavitt's uncle Moses Leavitt died at Stratham, New Hampshire, and named the novice preacher in his will. A year later, in 1749, Leavitt's brother Stephen died at Exeter, leaving Dudley most of his Stratham lands.

Rev. Leavitt was caught up in the wave of religious ferment which swept New England, taking the helm of the splinter group founded by Rev. Fisk, later known as the Third Church of Salem. "Our predecessors who built the former house", recounts the church history, "were thus compelled by a power, equal to that of the bayonet, to leave the place which they greatly loved, and to which they deeply, if not justly, felt that they had all the rights of a majority to retain." Leavitt was part of the New Light evangelical movement that swept New England. Within the esteemed First Church, the movement by the evangelicals had shaken the Church to its foundations and prompted the exodus of the congregation Leavitt later led.

In a letter from 'a gentleman in Salem' to a Boston friend in October 1745, the anonymous author recounted the subsequent dismissal of Fisk by his congregation, and his replacement by the young Leavitt. The letter was printed as a supplement to the newspaper The Boston Evening-Post on November 18, 1745, when printer Thomas Fleet openly identified himself as the printer of the anonymous letter. Meriting a supplement to the daily newspaper of the state's capital, the episode epitomized the religious debates still raging in the Commonwealth of Massachusetts over a century after its founding as a Puritan refuge.

"Mr. Leavitt was ordained at Salem about this time with vast disturbance", noted a contemporary ministerial observer. The observer attributed the disturbance to the fact that the schismatic congregation, still claiming to be the First Church of Salem, had axed the very man who led it out in protest.

The Third Church of Salem had been born of dissent: it split off from the First Church in 1735 under the leadership of Rev. Samuel Fisk, who had been let go by the First Church. Following Fisk's dismissal by his new congregation in 1745, the pastorate of Third Church was assumed by Leavitt. Dudley Leavitt's assumption of his minister's post in place of Samuel Fisk preceded the Great Awakening by a decade. The autocratic Fisk had broken off from his church in 1735, then a decade later he himself was deposed when church elders rebelled against ministerial authority and picked Leavitt as their candidate of change. Apparently in the decade of Fisk's control, his stern discipline in church matters alienated some of his supporters. After Leavitt's ordination, some of those who had voted a decade earlier to separate from First Church with Fisk instead elected to return to worship with their former enemies. Such were the ways of New England theocracy.

Seeking reconciliation with other church members after Leavitt's ordination, the Third Church appealed to ecclesiastical authorities in Boston for reconciliation after Fisk's dismissal. In 1748, a letter was penned by Leavitt's congregation repenting the "misconduct of their Brethren from whom we had withdrawn communion", according to ecclesiastical authorities in Boston. The letter from Rev. Leavitt's church "acknowledging their offense, and asking Forgiveness and reconciliation" was meant to assuage those who were put off by Fisk's ministerial authoritarianism.

The congregation's actions to atone for the offense they had apparently given under Fisk were applauded by church authorities in Massachusetts, who voted to resume contact with the Salem congregation. The confession was "so far satisfactory that the churches of the excommunicating council rescinded the actions of that council, one after another voting to resume the relations of fellowship."

By the time of the Great Awakening, almost a decade later, Rev. Leavitt was seen as a 'New Light', and Rev. Fisk, who had himself been a call for change, as an 'Old Light'.

Dudley Leavitt's congregation continued to cling to the name of First Church of Salem until 1763, a year after Leavitt's death, when the congregation finally assumed the name of Third Church of Christ in Salem. In a list of deceased ministers of 1764, Dudley Leavitt was still listed as minister of the First Church of Salem, even though the First Church refused to acknowledge that it had lost part of its congregation.

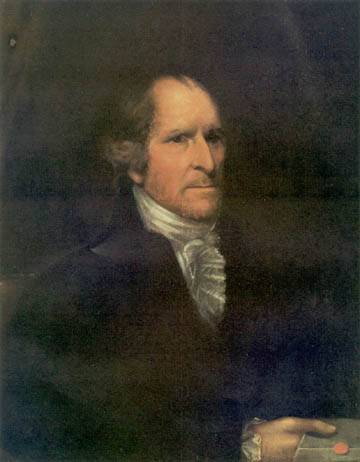
Timothy Pickering of Salem; his sister Mary Pickering married Rev. Dudley Leavitt

Dudley Leavitt died in Salem at age 42 in 1762 after a lingering illness. He is buried at Broad Street Cemetery in Salem. A portrait of the Rev. Dudley Leavitt by the colonial artist Joseph Badger was later shown in an exhibition at the Plummer Hall exhibition in Salem in December, 1875. At the time, the portrait was owned by Salem merchant John Pickering, Esq. Dudley Leavitt and his wife Mary (Pickering) Leavitt had three daughters: Sarah, who married Salem merchant Isaac White, and subsequently Jonathan Payson of Portsmouth, New Hampshire; Mary Leavitt who married Dr. Joseph Orne of Salem, a Harvard College graduate; and Elizabeth Leavitt, who married the merchant William Pickman of Salem. The prominent Salem merchant Dudley Leavitt Pickman was the son of William and Elizabeth (Leavitt) Pickman.

== See also ==
- Moses Leavitt
- Samuel Leavitt
- Thomas Dudley
- Dudley Leavitt Pickman
- Timothy Pickering
