= Samuel Leavitt =

American politician

Lieutenant Samuel Leavitt
- Born: c. April 1641; Hingham, Massachusetts Bay Colony, English America
- Died: August 6, 1707 (aged 66); Exeter, Province of New Hampshire, British America
- Occupations: Landowner; militia officer; politician
- Spouse: Mary Robinson (m. 1664)
- Children: 11
- Parent: John Leavitt (father)
- Relatives: Moses Leavitt (brother); Dudley Leavitt (grandson); Dudley Leavitt Pickman (2nd great-grandson)

Member of the New Hampshire House of Representatives for Exeter
- In office 1703 – 1704
- Military career
- Branch: New Hampshire Militia
- Service years: 1676–1707
- Rank: Lieutenant
- Conflicts: King Philip's War

Lieut. Samuel Leavitt (c. April 1641 – August 6, 1707) was an early colonial American settler of Exeter, New Hampshire, one of the four original towns in the colony of New Hampshire, where Leavitt later served as a delegate to the General Court as well as Lieutenant in the New Hampshire Militia, and subsequently as member of the New Hampshire House of Representatives. The recipient of large grants of land in Rockingham County, Leavitt held positions of authority within the colonial province.

== Life ==
Leavitt first appeared in Exeter in 1664, where he was granted 15 acres (6 ha) of land by the town. Three years later, in 1667, he bought a home and barn and 7 acres (3 ha) of land from his father-in-law John Robinson. In 1668, Leavitt was granted another 20 acres (8 ha) of land by the town, and in 1670 was granted an additional 50 acres (20 ha). In 1675 the records reflect that Leavitt was granted 300 acres (121 ha) more, and a year later was granted 6 acres (2 ha) more. In 1697 Leavitt received a grant for 20 acres (8 ha), and 100 acres (40 ha) more the following year, by which time his children were receiving their own grants of land in the town.

In 1652 Samuel Leavitt's father John Leavitt, then living in Hingham, Massachusetts, had been granted 200 acres (81 ha) in Exeter. There is no evidence that John Leavitt, father of Samuel, ever settled at Exeter – but both his sons eventually did; his son Moses Leavitt married Dorothy Dudley, daughter of Exeter's minister Dr. Samuel Dudley; his son Samuel married Mary Robinson, daughter of John Robinson, who was an early settler of Ipswich, Massachusetts and later an early Exeter settler. (Samuel and Moses Leavitt were half-brothers.)

As one of Exeter's earliest settlers, Leavitt was an early enforcer of town rules. In March 1673, for instance, he and John Wedgewood were charged with seizing any person who violated an order allowing new residents to cut 1,000 white oak pipe staves within a year. For their pains, the two were allowed to keep half the seized staves for themselves.

Samuel Leavitt eventually began to assume powerful positions within the state. In 1690 he was named to represent the town of Exeter at a convention of state deputies to assess the Province's relationship with the Massachusetts Bay Colony. (The reason for the meeting was the attempt by John Mason, the royal patentee of New Hampshire, to try to transfer his claim to a London merchant.) Leavitt is listed in this and subsequent documents as Lieutenant Samuel Leavitt, indicating that he was of some stature in the community by virtue of his leadership of the local militia. Left without a functioning government, New Hampshire voted to renew its association with Massachusetts until His Majesty's government in London was heard from.

By 1685 Leavitt was named captain of the town's colonial militia, along with William Hilton. By March 1690 Samuel Leavitt was acting as lieutenant of Exeter's militia, reporting to Major William Vaughan of Portsmouth.

By the end of the decade Samuel Leavitt was routinely acting on behalf of the town. On April 28, 1698, for instance, he and John Wedgewood and his cousin Moses Gilman acted to affirm a land grant to two settlers next to the land of 'Mr. Edward Hilton'. In 1703 Leavitt was a member of the New Hampshire House of Representatives, representing Exeter. Leavitt served in the House of Representatives again the following year.

But Leavitt's life was not entirely free of trouble. In 1684 he and his relative Moses Gilman were hauled before His Majesty's Justice of the Peace Henry Roby in Hampton and charged with disturbing the peace. 'Samuel Levett', as he is called in the original record, then called the marshall and his deputy "a couple of rogues", after which he struck the lawman, telling him that he had no power and that Leavitt would not obey his command. "The said Moses Gilman did suddenly rise up, and said that Samuel Levett should not go to prison", according to the record of the trial of the two men. In the resulting fracas, Leavitt and Gilman were eventually hauled off by the authorities. The source of the trouble had apparently been a political discussion about taxes and Royal authority in the province.

Lieut. Samuel Dudley and his wife Mary Robinson, who was born at Exeter, had 11 children. Leavitt's daughter Elizabeth married Lieut. James Dudley, grandson of Rev. Samuel Dudley, father-in-law of Samuel Leavitt's brother Moses. Elizabeth Leavitt married as her third husband Rev. John Odlin, a Harvard College-educated pastor of the church at Exeter. Lieut. Samuel Leavitt's daughter Sarah married Moses Leavitt Jr., son of Samuel Leavitt's brother Moses. Their son Dudley Leavitt became a well-known Congregationalist minister at Salem, Massachusetts. Samuel Leavitt's son James married Hannah Dudley, and died at Exeter in 1746, leaving lands to his grandson John Gilman, son of Elizabeth (Leavitt) Gilman, as well as lands to Mary (Leavitt) Tuck, another daughter. James Leavitt left to his son James his reserved pew at the Exeter meetinghouse.

Lieut. Samuel Leavitt died August 6, 1707, and was buried at Exeter. His half-brother Moses was still alive and living at Exeter.

== See also ==
- John Leavitt
- Moses Leavitt
- Dudley Leavitt (minister)
