= Worthington Ridge Historic District =

Historic district in Connecticut, United States

- U.S. National Register of Historic Places
- U.S. Historic district
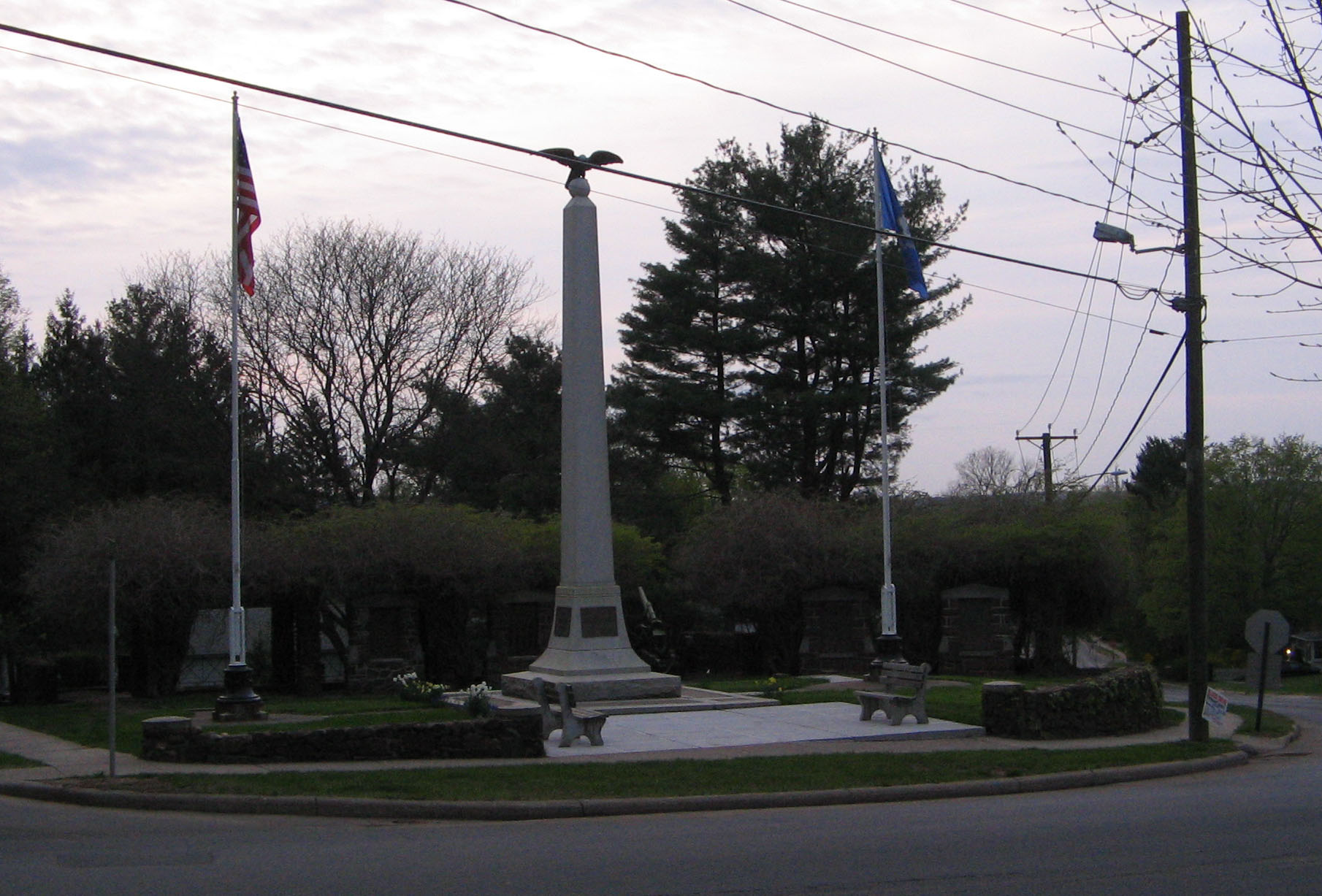

- Location within Connecticut Location within the United States
- Location: Roughly Worthington Ridge from Mill Street to Sunset Lane, Berlin, Connecticut
- Coordinates: 41°37′6″N 72°44′49″W
- Area: 54 acres (22 ha)
- Architectural style: Mid 19th Century Revival, Late Victorian, Colonial
- NRHP reference No.: 89000925
- Added to NRHP: July 13, 1989

The Worthington Ridge Historic District encompasses the historic town center of Berlin, Connecticut. It runs mostly along Worthington Ridge Road from the intersection of Mill Street (Route 372) to Sunset Lane. This section of road was historically part of the Boston Post Road laid out in 1673, and is now lined by a diversity of residential architecture and several of the town's civic buildings. In 1974, the Berlin Historic District was formed in order to preserve the integrity of the architecture of the village. The district was listed on the National Register of Historic Places in 1989.

== Description and history ==
The area that is now Berlin center was settled in the last quarter of the 17th century, when it was part of Farmington. Settlers farmed the lands between the area's basalt ridges, and built their houses on the ridges, Kensington ridge to the west and Worthington ridge to the east. The settlers built their first meeting house on the Kensington ridge in 1733, and another on Worthington ridge in 1774. The town of Berlin was incorporated in 1785, and its town meetings rotated between these two areas. The Worthington ridge became more important when the New York and New Haven Turnpike was routed along its road in 1798, leading to an increase in the number of shops, taverns, and other traveler facilities. The road continued to be an important travel route until the 1940s, when the Berlin Turnpike was built, diverting traffic away from the village.

The historic district is basically linear, extending along Worthington Ridge from Route 372 to Sunset Lane, including a few properties on Farmington Avenue, Sunset Lane and Hudson Street. The oldest surviving building is a house on Sunset Lane, estimated to date to 1720. The district is architecturally diverse, reflecting its long-standing significance in local civic affairs and as a transport junction. Most of the residences are wood frame structures, with a significant number dating to before 1820. The town's 1774 meeting house still stands at 723 Worthington Ridge, and the 1850 Gothic Revival Congregational Church is at 878 Worthington Ridge. Brandegee Hall, a Gothic structure built in 1884, served from 1906 to 1974 as Berlin's town hall.

== See also ==
- National Register of Historic Places listings in Hartford County, Connecticut
