= Harmony Grove Cemetery =

Historic rural cemetery in Essex County, Massachusetts

Coordinates: 42°31′33.21″N 70°54′52.22″W

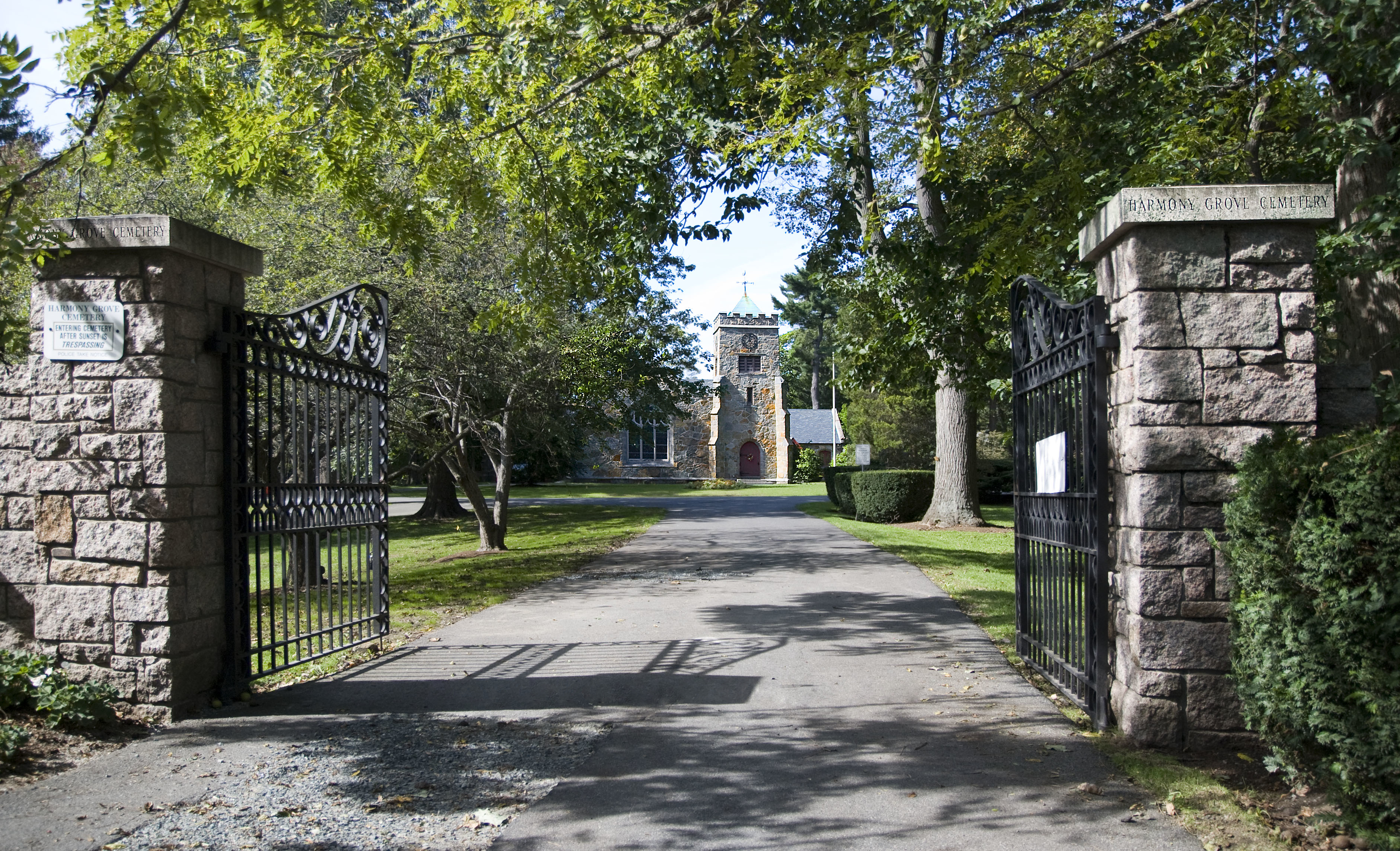

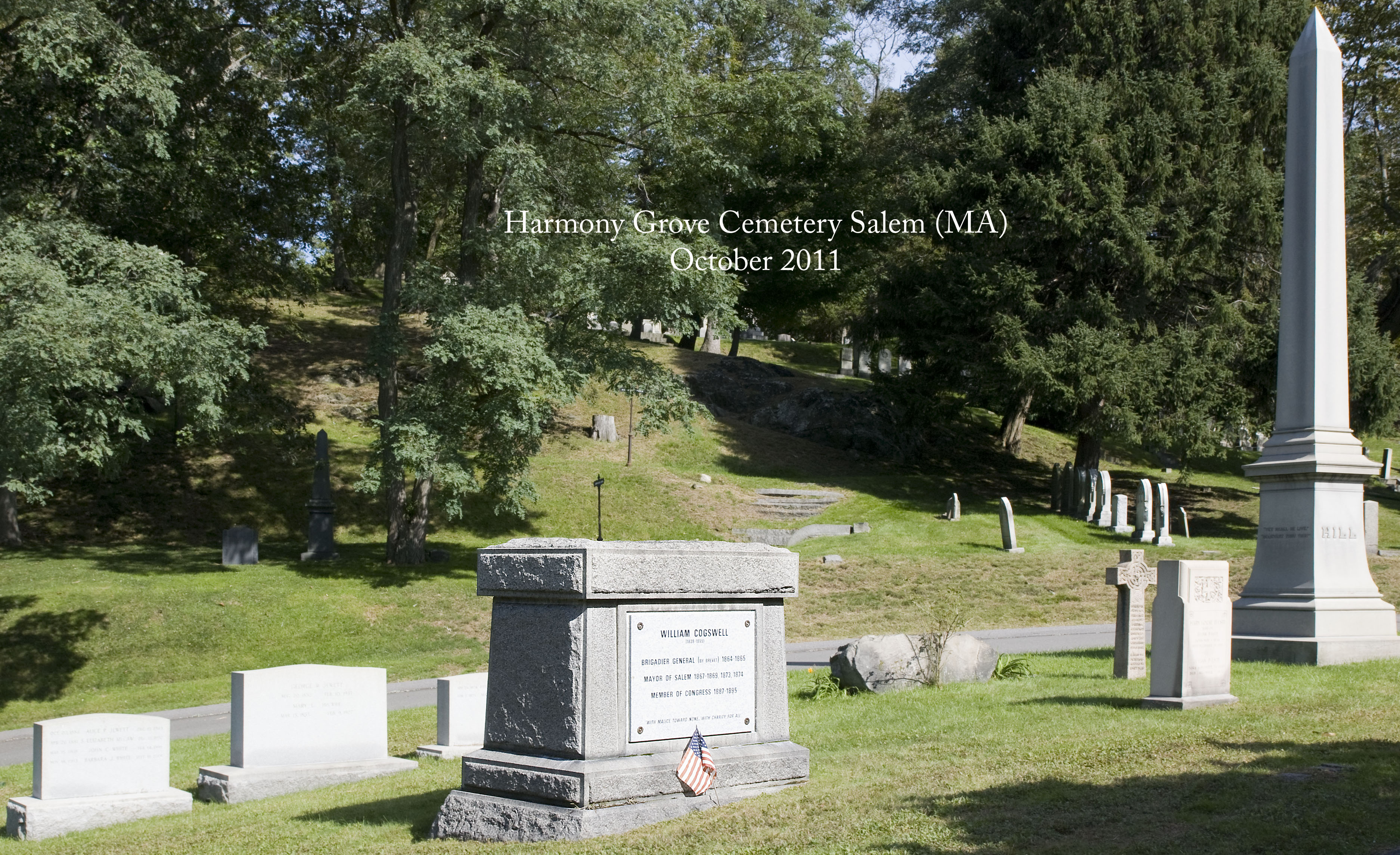

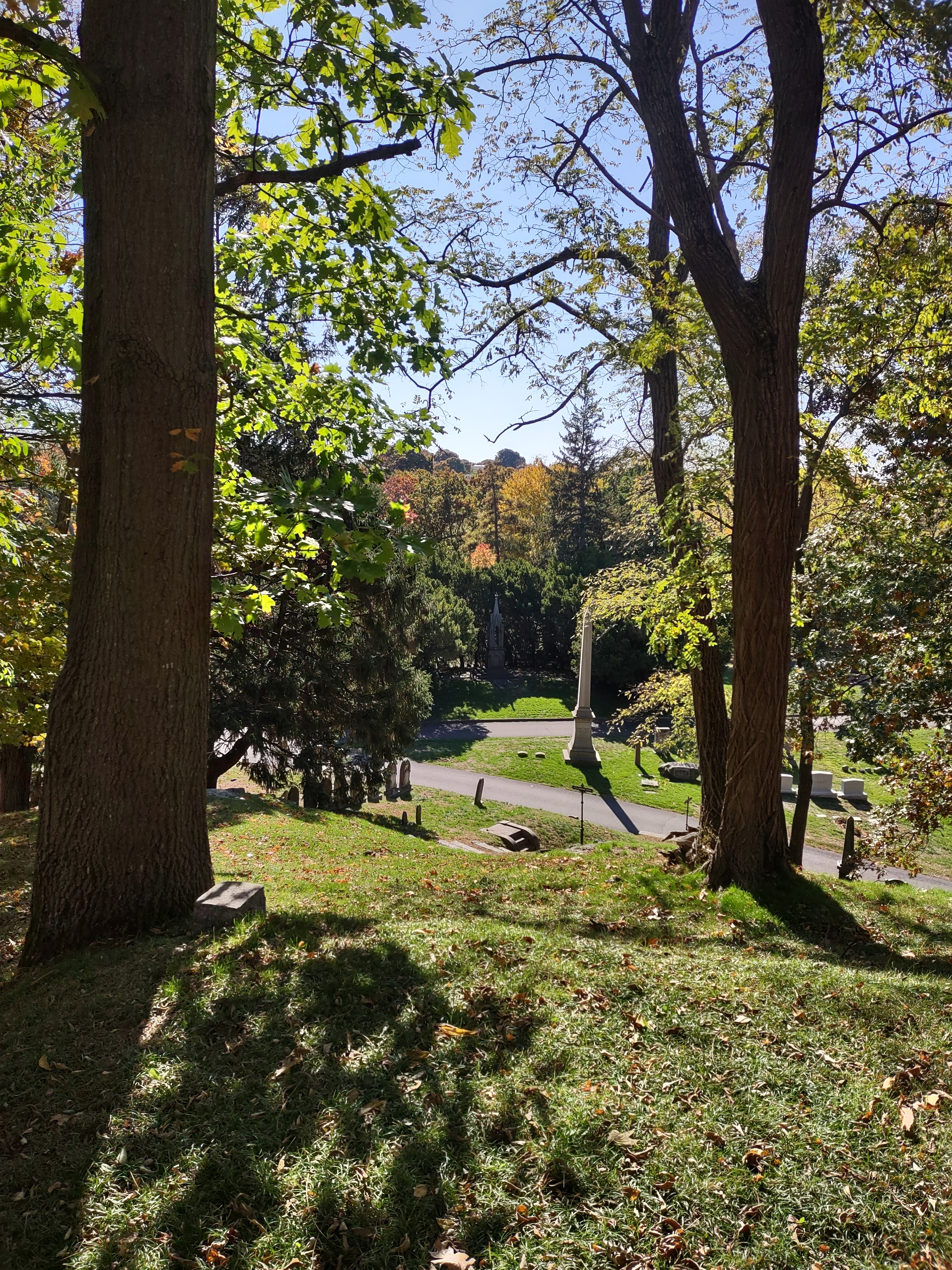

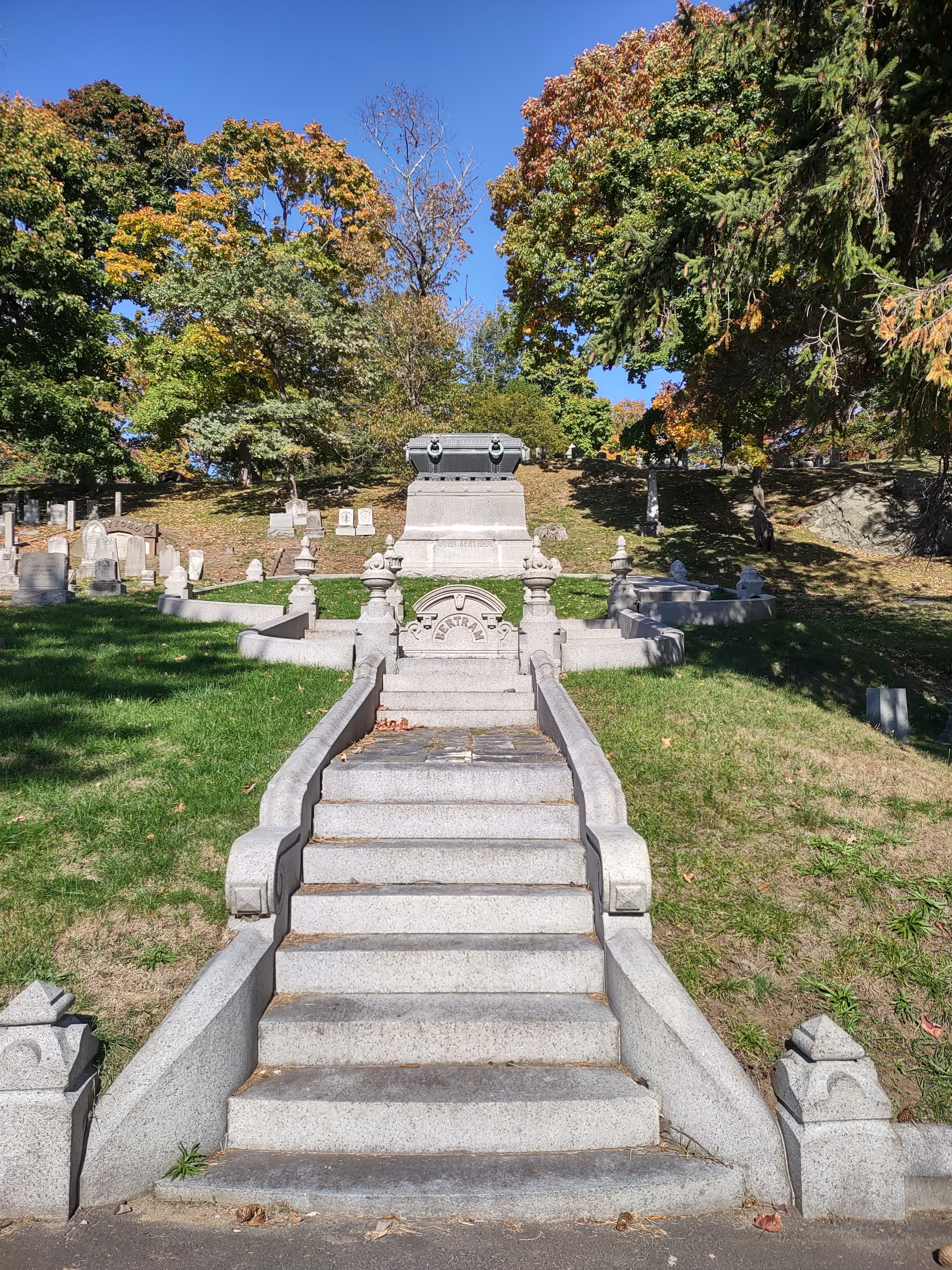

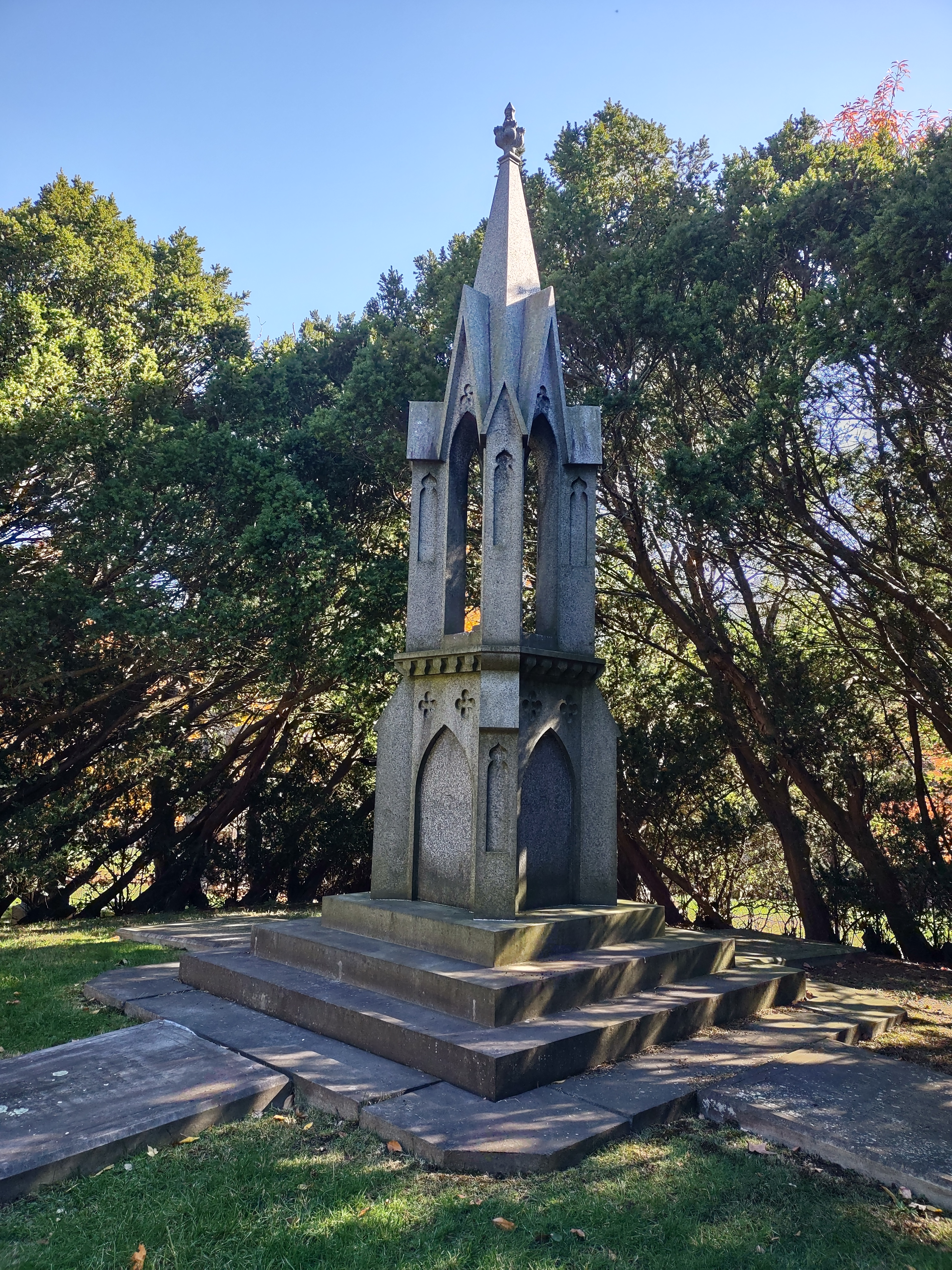
Joseph Peabody Monument Harmony Grove Cemetery

Harmony Grove Cemetery is a rural cemetery in Salem, Massachusetts. It was established in 1840 and is located at 30 Grove Street. The cemetery is approximately 57 acres in size and was designed by Francis Peabody and Alexander Wadsworth.

The cemetery includes the Gothic revival Blake Memorial Chapel of 1905.

== Notable burials ==
- James Armstrong (1794–1868), American Commodore
- Frank Weston Benson (1862–1951), American Impressionist artist
- John Prentiss Benson (1865–1947), Maritime paintings artist
- William Bentley (1759–1819), Unitarian minister and diarist
- Captain John Bertram (1796–1882) Founder of Salem Hospital . When John Bertram died in March 1882, his widow donated their home, John Bertram Mansion, a High Style Italianate brick and brownstone mansion that was built at 370 Essex Street and this became the Salem Public Library. In addition, John Bertram House is now a home for the elderly.
- William Cogswell (1838–1895), US Civil War general
- Jacob Crowninshield (1770–1808), Representative from Massachusetts
- Theodore Frelinghuysen Dwight (1846–1917), American librarian and archivist, and American diplomat to Switzerland.
- Luis F. Emilio (1844–1918), Member of Whipple's Jewels
- Caroline Emmerton (1866–1942), Founder of the Settlement at the House of Seven Gables
- William Crowninshield Endicott (1826–1900), US Secretary of War
- Maxim Karolik (1898–1964), Art collector and donor
- Photius Fisk (1809-1890) abolitionist and U.S. Navy Chaplain abolished flogging in U.S. Navy
- James Miller (1776–1851), War of 1812 general and first governor of Arkansas Territory
- Edward Sylvester Morse (1838–1925), American naturalist
- George Swinnerton Parker (1866–1952), Founder of Parker Brothers
- George Peabody (1795–1869), American businessman/philanthropist
- Joseph Peabody (1757-1844), American merchant
- Dudley Leavitt Pickman (1779–1846), American businessman/philanthropist
- William Frederick Poole (1821–1894), American bibliographer
- Charles Lenox Remond (1810–1873), American orator and abolitionist (brother of Sarah, see below)
- Leverett Saltonstall I (1783–1845), 1st Mayor of Salem, MA
- Thomas Treadwell Stone (1801–1895), Transcendentalist, Abolitionist

=== Monuments ===
There are several monuments in Harmony Grove.

- Cannons given to the cemetery by the War Department in 1888. These were outmoded soon after the Civil War.
- Monument for the family of Sarah Parker Remond (1826–1894), an American physician and abolitionist who was sister of Charles. Sarah was buried in Rome. Her father was John Remond.
- Monument for Frederick Townsend Ward (1831–1862), an American mercenary, who was cremated and buried in China.
- Monument for Stephen C. Phillips (1801–1857), Representative from Massachusetts

=== Old burial ground ===
An old burial ground, called Gardner Hill, was situated a little west of Harmony Grove. When the area of Boston Street and Grove was developed in the 1840s, one hundred fifty gravestones were moved from Gardner Hill to the cemetery. One of these was that of Thomas Gardner (1592–1674) who came to the area, from Cape Ann, with Roger Conant in 1626. The stones of Thomas' daughter, Seeth, and grandson, Abel, were also moved to Harmony Grove.

One of the stones moved from the old burial ground was for Robert Buffum who arrived in 1634, from Yoshire, England, and was buried in 1669. His is the oldest grave (stones - his remains are not there) in Harmony Grove.

== Sources ==
- Harmony Grove Cemetery (Salem, Mass.: Whipple and Smith, 1866)
- Harmony Grove Cemetery (Salem, Mass) - brochure (2010)
