= Dudley Leavitt Pickman =

American merchant and businessman (1779–1846)

- Portrait, c. 1888
- Born: May 4, 1779; Salem, Massachusetts, U.S.
- Died: November 4, 1846 (aged 67); Salem, Massachusetts, U.S.
- Occupations: Merchant; businessman
- Spouse: Catherine Saunders (m. 1810)
- Children: 3
- Relatives: Dudley Leavitt (maternal grandfather); Timothy Pickering (maternal granduncle)

Dudley Leavitt Pickman (May 4, 1779 – November 4, 1846) was an American merchant and businessman who built one of the great trading firms in Salem, Massachusetts, during the seaport's ascendancy as a trading power in the late eighteenth and early nineteenth centuries.

Pickman was a partner in the firm Devereux, Pickman & Silsbee and a state senator. Among the wealthiest Salem merchants of his day, Pickman used his own clipper ships to trade with the Far East in an array of goods ranging from indigo and coffee to pepper and spices, and was one of the state's earliest financiers, backing everything from cotton and woolen mills to railroads to water-generated power plants. Pickman also helped found what is today's Peabody Essex Museum.

== Early life and career ==
Dudley Leavitt Pickman was born at Salem, Massachusetts, in May 1779, the second son of Salem's chief Naval Officer, William Pickman (1748–1815) and his wife Elizabeth (Leavitt) Pickman, daughter of Dudley Leavitt, an early Congregational minister in Salem, and his wife Mary (Pickering) Leavitt, sister of United States Secretary of State Timothy Pickering. William Pickman secured his son a position in 1799 as a clerk for Chief Customs Collector Major Joseph Hiller. After working briefly for Hiller, Dudley Leavitt Pickman left the Customs Service in 1799 to go to sea as a ship's supercargo – business agent for the owner.

Pickman embarked on a merchant's career as a young man. He helped found the East India Marine Society (today's Peabody Essex Museum) of Salem in November 1800. (Joining two months prior was the eminent Salem merchant Elias Hasket Derby as well as Nathaniel Bowditch). In 1804 the East-India Marine Society moved to the Pickman Building on Essex Street, which had been specially fitted for the society.

Early in his career, Pickman traveled to India as supercargo on a ship belonging to several Salem merchants. In his diary of the journey, Journal of the Belisarius, Pickman noted the appearance of the British fort at Calcutta: "Fort St. George is a handsome brick fortification. It appears very strong, but is probably too much extended to make as able a defense as might otherwise be done."

Pickman kept journals on several of his other voyages as supercargo and then owner, and as its charter required, these journals were filed with the East-India Marine Society of Salem. These early documents show the vast reach of the large Salem trading houses. In 1799–1800, for instance, Pickman noted that the Belisarius had traveled first to the island of Tenerife, back to Salem, then on to Madras and Tranquebar, India, before returning to the Massachusetts port loaded with her bounty. The following year, Pickman kept the journal of the voyage of the ship Anna, captained by Benjamin Swett, which sailed from Boston to Sumatra and back in 1801.

Pickman made his early career out of repeated trips on the Belisarius. Before the ship went to pieces in a gale in the Bay of Tunis in April 1810, the 94-foot (29 m) clipper made repeated voyages to India and Sumatra with several captains in command and Pickman acting as supercargo. The clipper ship's voyages prompted Salem cleric Dr. William Bentley to call her "one of the richest ships of our port". (Captain Samuel Skerry, the most renowned of the Belisarius's captains, died at age 36 after being kicked in the stomach by a horse.)

== Later career ==
Pickman soon founded his own trading firm. He and his partners owned an array of clipper ships including the brig Endeavor, the Malay, the Borneo, the Belisarius, the Herald, the Coromandel, the Persia, the Friendship and others. The ships traded with India, Zanzibar, Madagascar, Sumatra, Java, the Philippines, Malaya and other far-flung trading ports.

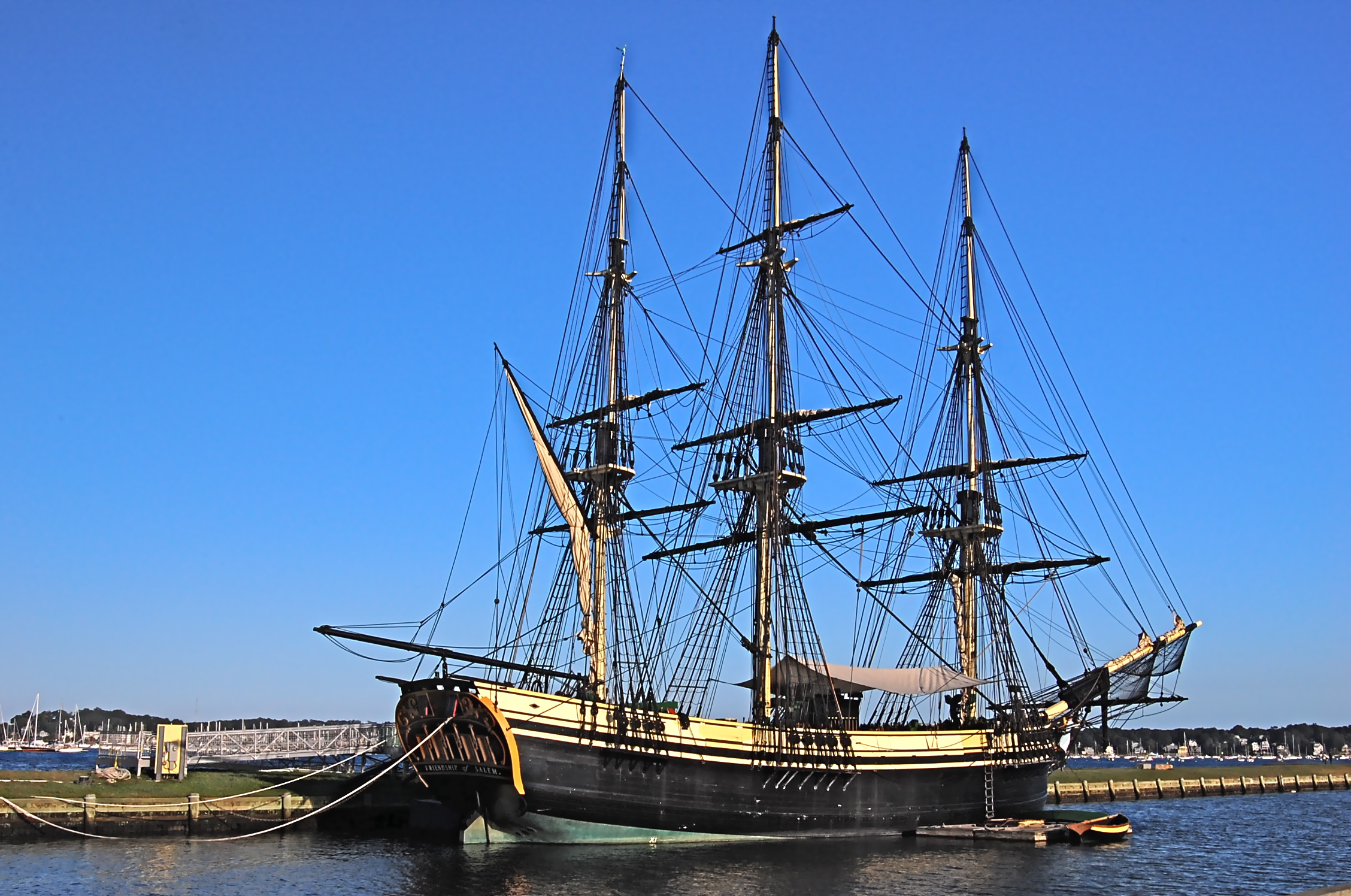
Friendship of Salem – replica of early East Indiaman owned by Dudley Leavitt Pickman and partners

Initially a partner of the Salem trading firm of Stone, Silsbees, Pickman & Allen, Pickman later became one of two partners of the firm of Silsbee & Pickman, one of the largest Salem trading houses, operated by Nathaniel Silsbee and Pickman. Pickman made much of his early fortune from trade with India. He later helped finance some Indian factories as an owner. His firm was so influential that was known in Salem as "The Old East-India Company".

As Pickman's business investments took off, he became an active financier, and owned interests in emerging industries across New England. He was a founding investor in the companies that developed the water power and owned much of the real estate in Lowell, Manchester and Lawrence. He was also a large stockholder in many cotton and woolen mills in Massachusetts and New Hampshire, and was a large investor in many early railroad companies. In 1818, Pickman purchased 50 shares of the Suffolk Bank, a clearinghouse bank on State Street in Boston.

Pickman was an active merchant, writing to politicians such as Henry Clay to promote his mercantile interests and arguing for the need for protective tariffs. Pickman also frequently corresponded with other powerful merchants and statesmen such as Paine Wingate and Samuel Curwen.

Pickman was heavily involved in nearly all aspects of Salem's municipal and business life. He served with Leverett Saltonstall and Nathaniel Bowditch as trustees of the estate of Simon Forrester. A ship captain born in Ireland, Forrester had become one of the pioneers of Salem merchant shipping and became one of Salem's leading merchants and philanthropists.

The large brick mansion built for Pickman by architect Jabez Smith in 1819 at the corner of Chestnut and Pickering Streets in Salem was later known as the Shreve-Little House (and later still as the Baldwin-Lyman House). Pickman married on September 6, 1810, Catherine Saunders, daughter of Salem merchant Thomas Saunders and his wife Elizabeth (Elkins) Saunders.

Dudley Leavitt Pickman was a longtime member of Salem's old North Church. His portrait is owned by the Peabody Essex Museum, where it forms part of a collection of the founders of Salem's East India Marine Society in 1799. In the Massachusetts Historical Society is a copy of William Shakespeare's Twelfth Night from the library of Dudley Pickman Leavitt – a copy of the first publication in America of the English playwright's work.

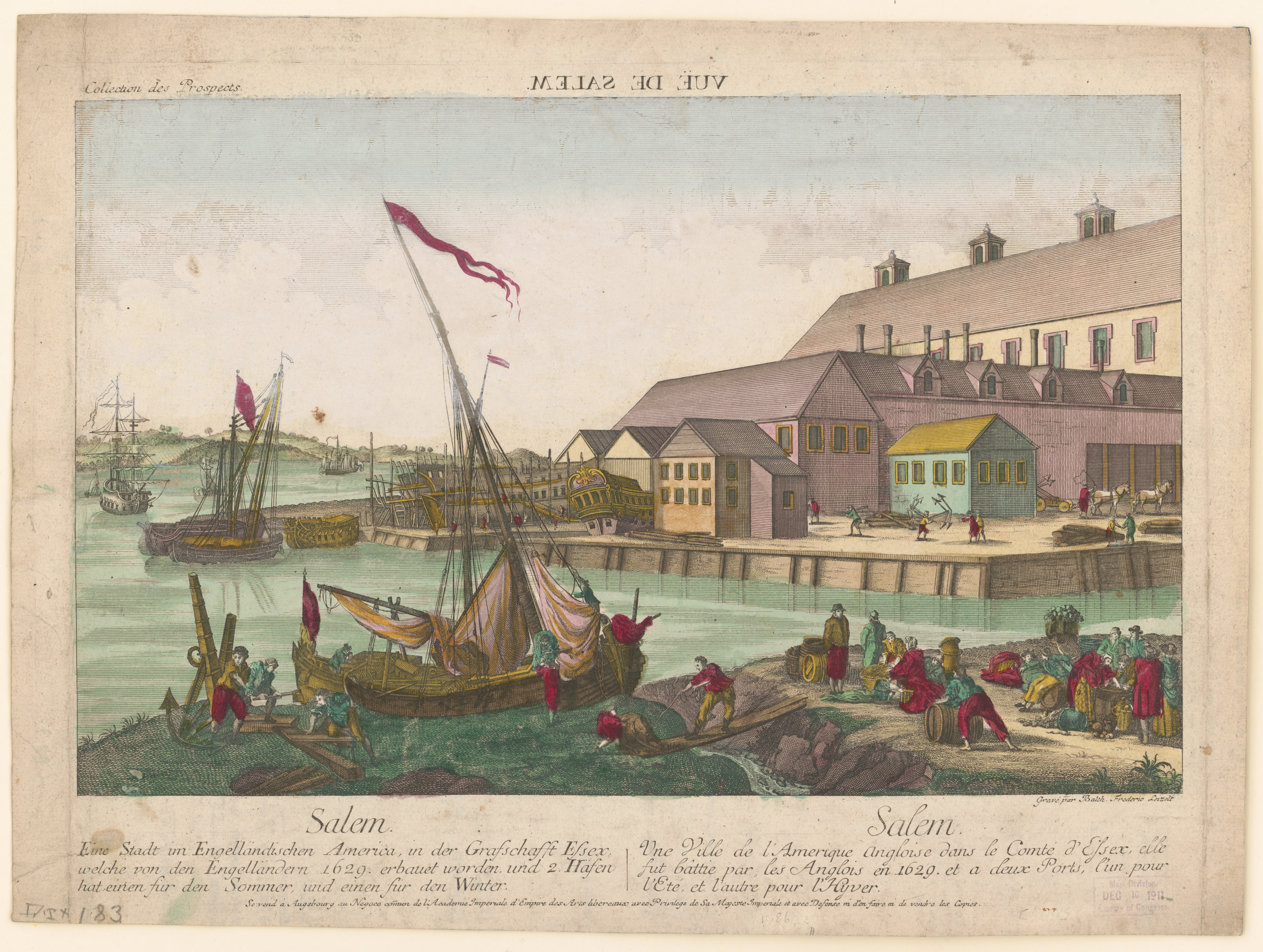
Early scene along the Salem waterfront, Salem, Massachusetts

== Descendants and legacy ==
Dudley Leavitt Pickman's son William Dudley Pickman continued the family trading enterprises, eventually moving the shipping interests to Boston but retaining a counting house in Salem. William Dudley Pickman married Caroline Silsbee, daughter of Salem merchant Zachariah F. Silsbee. William Dudley Pickman's partner in the Boston-based firm was his son Dudley Leavitt Pickman, who became a fixture in Boston business and social circles, and a large donor of family art and antiques to the Boston Museum of Fine Arts, as well as a trustee of Salem's Peabody Museum.

Dudley Leavitt Pickman's daughter Elizabeth became the second wife of Salem merchant Richard Saltonstall Rogers, whose first wife Sarah Crowninshield died young. Pickman's daughter Catherine Saunders married Boston merchant Richard S. Fay. One of Pickman's sons, Edward Motley, attended Harvard Law School, and became a Boston writer.

His son Dudley Leavitt Pickman Jr. attended Noble and Greenough School, Harvard College, where he was president of the Hasty Pudding Club, and Harvard Law School, practiced law in Boston and lived in a 40-room granite mansion, staffed by five servants and designed by architect Stanford White at 303 Commonwealth Avenue in Boston, as well as in Beverly, Massachusetts. He served as a director for a number of public companies, including a subsidiary of Calumet and Hecla Mining Company and as one of the first three trustees of the Henry Wadsworth Longfellow House National Park site in Cambridge, Massachusetts.

Dudley Leavitt Pickman Jr. continued the family's tradition of making gifts of significant family heirlooms and antiques to the collection of the Boston Museum of Fine Arts, including a teapot by silversmith John Coburn bearing the Pickman family coat of arms. Born in Geneva, Switzerland, in 1885, Dudley Leavitt Pickman Jr. also became a noted mountaineer and porcelain expert, who published several books on the subject. Along with his friends Harold Stirling Vanderbilt, Francis Bacon and Frederic Allen, Pickman played the first game of contract bridge in its modern form. He married the widow of Boston businessman Alexander Lynde Cochrane.

In its obituary of Dudley Leavitt Pickman Jr., The New York Times noted the lawyer and author's service as trustee of the Boston Museum of Fine Arts, as well as his avocation as "a noted mountain climber". Pickman, who died at his residence at 38 Beacon Street on Beacon Hill, was 87.

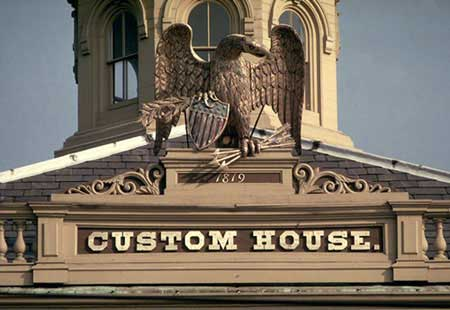
Salem Custom House, Salem, Massachusetts. First place of employment of supercargo Dudley Leavitt Pickman

The Pickman family intermarried with other prominent early Salem and Boston families, including that of Joseph Story Fay, the Crowninshields, the Pickerings, the Rodmans, the Silsbees, Rogers, Saunders and Motleys and others.

The family also later owned an estate located near Two Brothers Rocks in Bedford, Massachusetts, so named because the lands were patented by both Massachusetts Bay Colony governors John Winthrop and Thomas Dudley. Dudley Leavitt Pickman and his progeny were descended from both early governors.

The Salem merchant Dudley Leavitt Pickman is buried at Salem's Harmony Grove Cemetery, not far from the grave of his partner, merchant and United States Senator from Massachusetts Nathaniel Silsbee. Pickman's tombstone reads: "A successful merchant, distinguished for his sound practical good sense and an inflexible regard to truth and justice."

== See also ==
- Dudley Leavitt (minister)
- Dudley Pound
- Timothy Pickering
- Moses Leavitt
- Benjamin Pickman Jr.
