= Mary Pickering Nichols =

American translator

- Born: January 29, 1829; Salem, Massachusetts, US
- Died: February 3, 1915 (aged 86); Boston, Massachusetts, US
- Burial place: Mount Auburn Cemetery, Cambridge, Massachusetts
- Occupation: German translator

Mary Pickering Nichols (January 29, 1829 – February 3, 1915), was an American translator of German literature, active in the last quarter of the 19th century. She was the fifth of the six children of Benjamin Ropes Nichols and her namesake Mary Pickering. She is credited with making the first complete English translation of the medieval German epic poem Gudrun in 1889.

In 1875, she translated Piano and Song: How to Teach, How to Learn, and How to Form a Judgment of Musical Performance by Friedrich Wieck, the famed instructor of his daughter Clara Schumann and son-in-law Robert Schumann. According to census records, (Note: Available every 10 years from 1870 to 1910. According to all of these, the siblings lived alone with a changing staff of two Irish servants. See, for example: "United States Census, 1910," database with images, FamilySearch (https://familysearch.org/ark:/61903/1:1:M2K5-3SM : 20 October 2015), Mary P Nichols in household of Benjamin W Nichols, Boston Ward 11, Suffolk, Massachusetts, United States; citing enumeration district (ED) ED 1419, sheet 4B, NARA microfilm publication T624 (Washington, D.C.: National Archives and Records Administration, n.d.); FHL microfilm 1,374,631.) she never married and spent most of her adult life living at 10 Chestnut Street, a block from Boston Common, with her brother Benjamin who she thanked in the preface to both translations mentioned above. She died there in 1915, at age 86.

== Published works ==
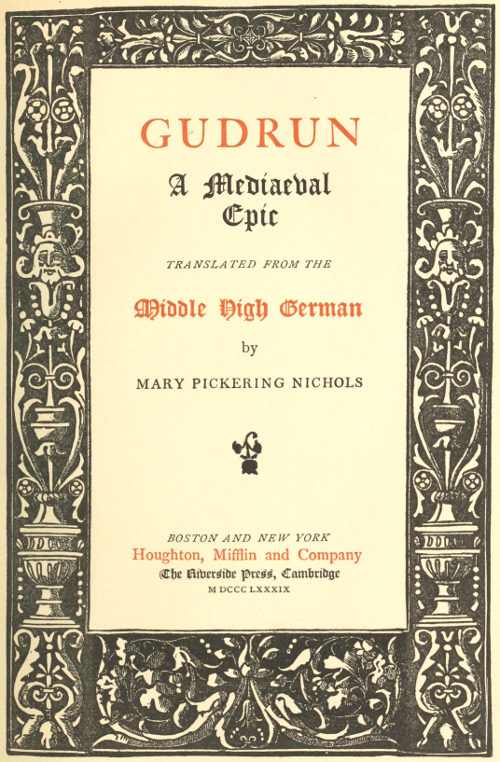
Cover page of Nichols' 1889 translation of Gudrun

- 1875. Piano and Song: How to Teach, How to Learn, and How to Form a Judgment of Musical Performance, Translated from the German of Friederich Wieck. Boston: Lockwood, Brooks and Company. 197 pages.
- 1889. Gudrun: A medieval epic, translated from the Middle High German. Houghton, Mifflin and Company: Boston and New York. 363 pages.
