= Dudley Leavitt (publisher) =

Teacher, mathematician, writer, publisher (1772–1851)

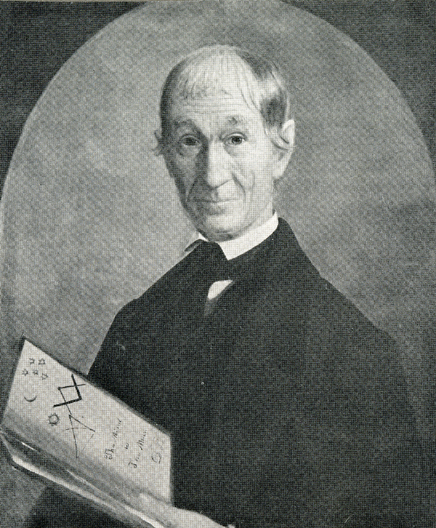
- Leavitt in 1849
- Born: 1772; Exeter, New Hampshire
- Died: September 20, 1851 (aged 78–79); Meredith, New Hampshire
- Education: Phillips Exeter Academy
- Occupations: Teacher, mathematician, writer, publisher
- Spouse: Judith Glidden
- Writing career
- Notable work: Leavitt's Farmers Almanack

Dudley Leavitt (1772 – September 20, 1851) was an American publisher. He was an early graduate of Phillips Exeter Academy in his native town of Exeter, New Hampshire, and later moved to Gilmanton where he first edited a newspaper and taught school. Within a few years, Leavitt relocated to Meredith, where in addition to teaching school and farming, he began publishing in 1797 Leavitt's Farmers Almanack, one of the nation's earliest farmers' almanacs. A polymath, Leavitt poured his knowledge of disparate fields including mathematics, language and astronomy into the wildly popular almanacs, which outlived their creator, being published until 1896. The inaugural issue of 1797 carried the title of The New England Calendar: Or, Almanack for the Year of Our Lord 1797. On the cover was the disclaimer that the new publication was "Calculated for the Meridian of Concord, Latitude 43° 14' N. Longitude 72° 45' W.: And with But Little Variation Will Answer for Any of the New England States."

== Youth and early career ==
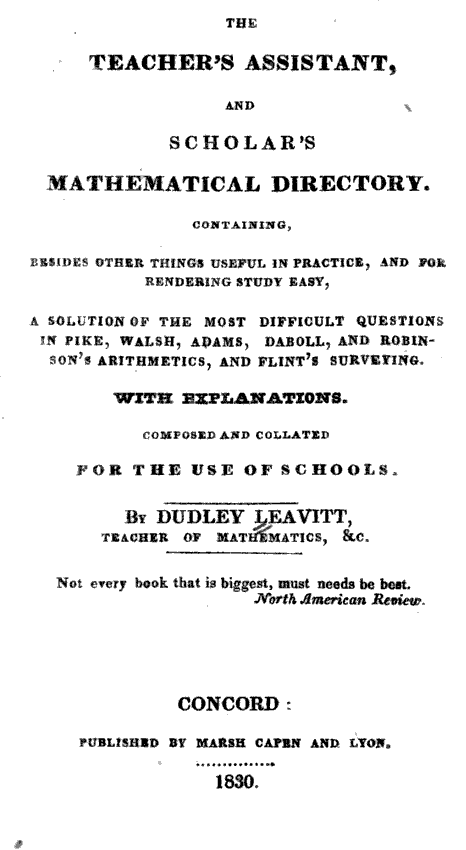
The Teacher's Assistant, and Scholar's Mathematical Directory, by Dudley Leavitt, 1830

Dudley Leavitt was born at Exeter, the oldest child of farmer and landowner Joshua Leavitt and Elizabeth (née James). He was named after Governor Thomas Dudley, the second colonial governor of Massachusetts, from whom both parents descended. The descendant of early Exeter settlers, his father Joshua moved from Exeter to Deerfield early in Dudley Leavitt's life. After attending Exeter Academy, where he graduated in 1790, Leavitt married Judith Glidden of Gilmanton in 1794, and he and his new wife took up residence in the town, where he had family. In Gilmanton, Leavitt began studying Latin and Greek under Rev. Isaac Smith. In 1802 Leavitt also served as a selectman for the town.

Leavitt's first love was mathematics and astronomy. Something of a pure scientist, Leavitt contributed scientific papers to societies until the end of his life, often having to do with astronomy and physics. The annual conventions of the American Philosophical Society often heard presentations of the latest of Leavitt's findings. Nor were Leavitt's the musings of some crackpot New Hampshire hermit. In an 1811 paper concerning astronomy addressed to the President and membership of the American Academy of Arts and Sciences, for instance, Leavitt outlined his New and short Method of calculating the times of the First and Last Quarters of the Moon.

But with his scholarly inquiries and meager publishing income, Leavitt turned to teaching to supplement his income. In 1800 he founded the Gilmanton Gazette, a local weekly newspaper in Gilmanton, as well as the Farmer's Weekly Magazine for two years with a partner in the newly established publishing house of "Leavitt & Clough". Leavitt's foray into newspaper publishing was an apparent failure, but he was pioneer of the industry in the state. The presses used to print his early broadsheet were purchased by the proprietors of the new Concord Gazette in 1806, who paid to have the presses lugged from Gilmanton to Concord on a two-horse wagon so they could begin printing one of the capital's earliest newspapers, and the only competitor of The New Hampshire Patriot.

Discouraged with the economics of newspaper publishing, Leavitt and his wife decided to move to Meredith in 1819. Pursuing another avenue of work, Leavitt ran an advertisement in the Concord Observer newspaper announcing that he was opening the "Meredith Academick School". The new school, its headmaster announced, would "offer instruction in the various grades usually taught in academies.... No pains will be spared on the part of the instructor to render the acquisition of useful knowledge easy and pleasant to those young gentlemen and ladies who may attend the School."

The "reasonable" board would cost $3.00 for each quarter's enrolment, Leavitt announced in his initial advertisement, and would cover most fields of study, except "Algebra, Navigation, Gunnery, or the Science of Projectiles, &c., Spherick Geometry & Trigonometry, Astronomy & Philosophy." For study in those more complicated fields Leavitt proposed to charge an additional 50 cents tuition for each quarter of enrolment. Around Meredith the new schoolmaster became known as "Old Master Leavitt".

Leavitt settled on his Meredith farm near Center Harbor, less than a mile from Lake Winnipesaukee, where he held his classes. He was known as a stern taskmaster who did not suffer fools, or wisecracking students. But Leavitt had enough of a sense of whimsy that he handpainted panels of "Award of Merit" to those students he felt met his stringent guidelines. (Leavitt never gave up teaching, even when busying himself with his almanac and other projects. He taught school into his 70s, and it was customary in New Hampshire for successful men to boast that they had been educated by Leavitt.)

When not teaching, he farmed his 50 acres (200,000 m2) or studied. Accounts describe Leavitt becoming deeply focused on reading or study. In addition to editing an agricultural newspaper, Leavitt raised cattle on his farm and worked on it when not teaching or writing.

Out of the confluence of Leavitt's scholarly interests, his former career as a newspaper writer and publisher, and his work as an author of textbooks was born the idea behind his farmer's almanac, which he first began publishing while living in Gilmanton. From the beginning, Leavitt demonstrated an unrelenting common sense, as well as a sly sense of humor. In an early edition of his almanacs, for instance, Leavitt included an illustration of a New Hampshireman struggling against the elements. Quoting a supposed poem of the 17th century, Leavitt wrote, in lines summoning feelings familiar to current Granite State residents, "Our mountains and hills and our vallies (sic) below; Being commonly cover'd with ice and with snow; And when the north-west wind with violence blows, Then every man pulls his cap over his nose; But if any's so hardy, and will it withstand, He forfeits a finger, a foot or a hand."

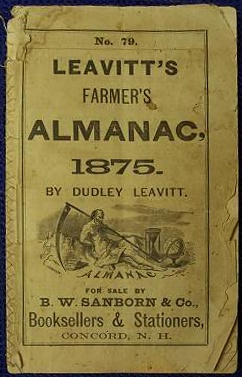
Cover of Leavitt's Farmer's Almanac, 1875, Concord, New Hampshire

Leavitt continued to publish the eponymous almanac after he moved to Meredith. He had already founded a newspaper in 1811, while still living in Gilmanton, which he called The New Hampshire Register, and which he continued publishing for several years (1811–17). The Register became well-known thanks to Leavitt's habit of printing brief synopses of historical events. On the side, between farming, teaching school, and publishing his newspaper, Leavitt wrote and published at least eight textbooks on mathematics, grammar, astronomy, geography and music, including an edition of Nicolas Pike's widely distributed A New and Complete System of Arithmetic in 1826, as well as the staple textbooks of teachers across the nation The Scholar's Review and Teacher's Daily Assistant. The scores of textbooks produced by Leavitt, a dizzying array of titles down the years, including Complete Directions for Parsing the English Language; Or, The Rules of Grammar Made Easy: Being a New Grammatical Essay, Designed as a Supplement to Lindley Murray's Grammar, for the Use of Students as Soon as They Begin to Parse, make one wonder where Leavitt found the time.

== The new almanac takes off ==
But the almanac, which he dubbed Leavitt's Farmers' Almanack and Miscellaneous Yearbook, became such a success that after a while Leavitt shelved many of his other activities to focus on it. The once-farfetched idea was a runaway hit. By 1846, for instance, Leavitt's almanacs were selling some 60,000 copies for that year's two editions – a tremendous number for the era.

What Leavitt seized on, probably because of his interest in astronomy, was something every New Englander knew: that the weather was topic number one. Leavitt's publication, with its interest in astronomy and crops, was an early "Weather Channel". He took note of inclement and especially of freakish weather. And readers noticed. During the cold summer of 1816, when crops froze in July, and snow fell a foot deep in the Berkshires, Leavitt turned to his astronomy to divine the cause: he attributed the cold to sun spots. Had he known about it, Leavitt might have suggested the eruption of Mount Tambora in the East Indies as the cause. But whatever the cause was, readers noticed that Leavitt noticed and hazarded a guess, at least, and one that sounded plausible, at least to their ears. Of such stuff are circulation gains made.

Ultimately the schoolteacher and part-time farmer Leavitt came to be seen as "Leavitt the almanac-maker", as he was often referred to in his day, and in the ultimate tribute, his once-anonymous almanacs came to carry the creator's name. In an early instance of "brand identity", by 1824 the almanacs carried the title of Leavitt's New-England Farmer's Almanack. During his era, improbably enough, Dudley Leavitt was as close to a celebrity as the times produced. "Through his almanacs," noted Joseph Walker, as close a biographer as the almanac-compiler ever had, "(Leavitt) was probably known to more persons in New Hampshire than any other man."

The aura of celebrity around Leavitt was such, wrote Henry McFarland in his Sixty Years in Concord and Elsewhere, that "stage-drivers pointed out his house to passengers as that of a person of great renown.... I remember him as a courtly man with gentle manners." John F. Brown, a local printer for whom McFarland worked, published Leavitt's almanacs, paying the unheard-of sum, said McFarland, of "$100 for the copy."

Leavitt aimed the almanacs at the general population of New England, supplying tips on everything from farming to the weather to astronomy. As word spread about the publication, readership jumped, and the publication became a fixture throughout the region. The almanacs were sold at general stores, and later at grocery stores and drug stores. Leavitt was aided in some of the almanac's calculations geared towards agriculture by his nephew, astronomer William B. Leavitt.

The almanac's entry of September 6, 1881, for instance, published after the founder's death, demonstrated the detailed observation of natural phenomena which marked the publication. "Tuesday, September 6, 1881, was remarkable over the whole of New England and may be known as Yellow Day. It was so dark in many places that artificial light was needed for the common acts of indoor life. Without, the dense curtains of smoke or dry fog that shut out the sun, gave a peculiar yellow hue to the atmosphere, changing the color of the trees and grass, perplexing the birds and other animals and seriously frightening the superstitious. It will long be remembered."

Despite his descent from Puritan John Leavitt, founding deacon of Old Ship Church, America's oldest in continuous use, Dudley Leavitt was a skeptic. Perhaps it was his academic and scientific nature, but Leavitt was known throughout the Meredith area for his scoffing at religion. At one session of evening prayer, for instance, Leavitt's wife offered up a fervent prayer that her husband scholar be saved. When she was done, Leavitt got up, put on his hat and said "We read in God's word, that the unbelieving husband shall be justified by the prayers of the believing wife," and marched out of the church.

== Leavitt's death and legacy ==
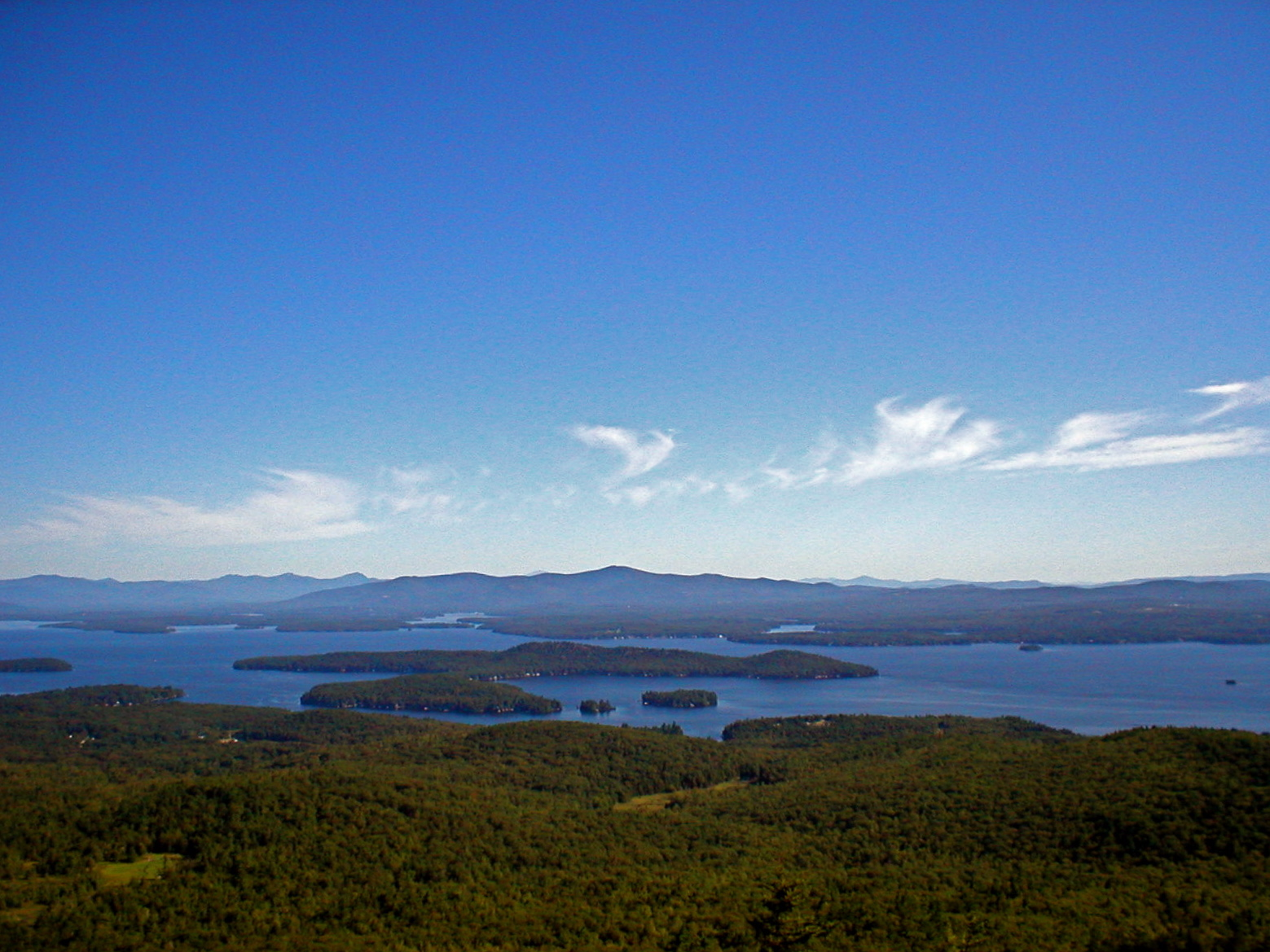
Lake Winnipesaukee, not far from the farm of Dudley Leavitt in Center Harbor

Leavitt died at his farm in Meredith on September 20, 1851. At the time of his death, Leavitt had the upcoming issue of his almanac at the press, and another five years' worth of issues of his almanac written, calculated and ready for the printer. The feat was so impressive to fellow writers and printers that one contemporary journal was moved to declare: "This is a degree of punctuality, of which there are few examples, especially in the editorship of a periodical work."

The New York Times carried news of the death of the man who had become something of a quiet sensation, known for the paper almanacs which hung by cords in family kitchens across New England. "Dudley Leavitt, the veteran almanac maker, died this morning", noted The Times. "His age was 80." Leavitt was buried in the Leavitt private burial ground on the family farm near his home. His beloved almanac, for which he did all the calculations and writing, outlived him. It continued to be published in Concord until 1896 – 45 years after its founder's death. William B. Leavitt edited the publication following his father's death.

A New Hampshire historical marker (number 7) in Center Harbor notes that Leavitt's publication "provided information vital to domestic and agricultural life of the period. He lived in house 200 yards east." The almanac was one of the longest-running such publications in the history of the nation. The Old Farmer's Almanac, which first appeared in 1792, five years ahead of Leavitt's almanac, was the Meredith schoolteacher's chief competitor, and has been published continuously ever since – making it the oldest continuously published periodical in North America.

The New Hampshire Historical Society in Concord owns a painting of Dudley Leavitt, to which local citizens contributed towards the purchase, including former Governor Charles H. Bell and diplomat George G. Fogg, both of whom were connected to Leavitt through his Gilman ancestors. Leavitt and his wife had 11 children, two of whom married Congregational missionaries to Thailand.
