= Economy of Puerto Rico =

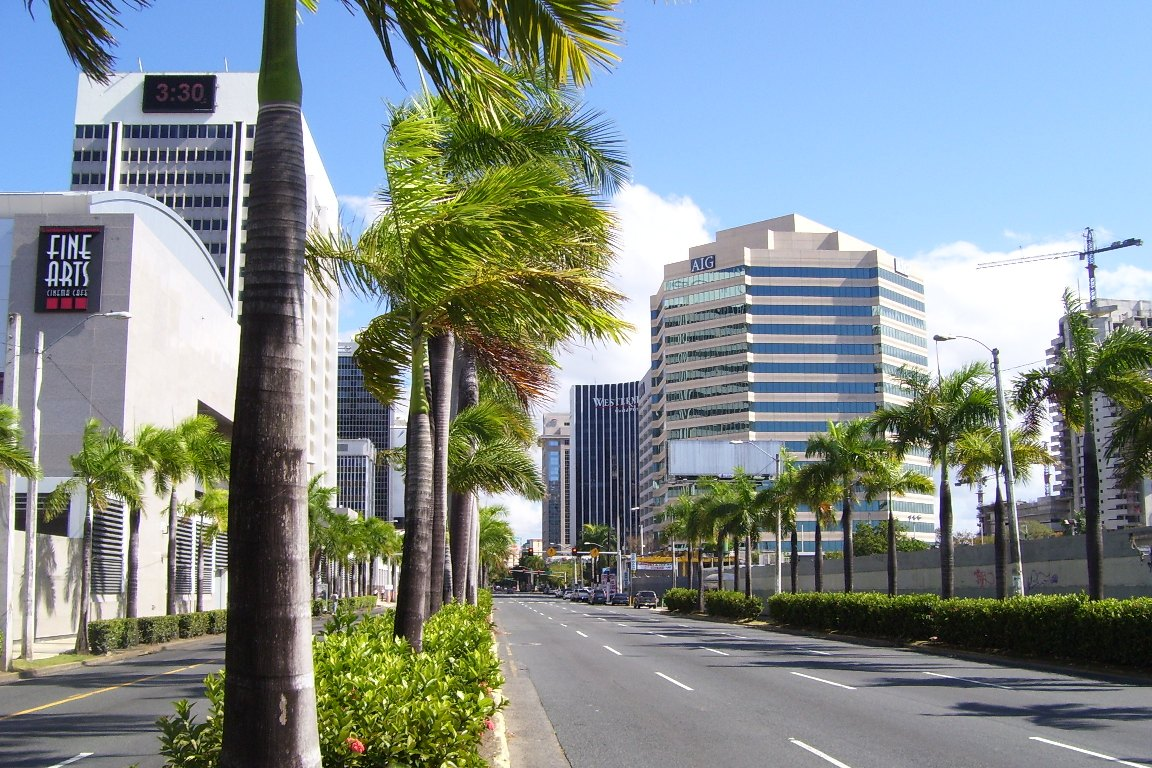
- Milla de Oro in Hato Rey, San Juan
- Currency: United States dollar (US$)
- Fiscal year: 1 July – 30 June
- Trade organizations: CARICOM (observer), IOC, ITUC, UNWTO (associate)
- Country group: Advanced economy; High-income economy

Statistics
- Population: ▲3,285,874
- GDP: ▲$129.19 billion (nominal, 2026); ▲$166.26 billion (PPP, 2026)
- GDP rank: 66th (nominal, 2026); 89th (PPP, 2026)
- GDP growth: –0.1% (2026); 1.0% (2027f); 0.6% (2028f)
- GDP per capita: ▲$40,707 (nominal, 2026); ▲$52,388 (PPP, 2026)
- GDP per capita rank: 30th (nominal, 2026); 42nd (PPP, 2026)
- GDP by sector: agriculture: 0.8%; industry: 50.1%; services: 49.1%; (2017 est.)
- Inflation (CPI): 1.0% (2020 est.)
- Population below national poverty line: 45% (Note: Quintero (2013; in Spanish) "Los indicadores de una economía débil son muchos, y la economía en Puerto Rico está sumamente debilitada, según lo evidencian la tasa de desempleo (13.5%), los altos niveles de pobreza (41.7%), los altos niveles de quiebra y la pérdida poblacional.")
- Gini coefficient: 0.537 high (2010)
- Human Development Index: 0.845 high (2015) (n/a rank)
- Labor force: ▲1,097,861 (2019); 35.2% employment rate (2015)
- Labor force by occupation: Services: 29.9%; Government: 23.7%; Trade: 21.8%; Manufacturing: 9.2%; Transportation and other public utilities: 5.2%; Construction and mining: 4.9%; Finance, insurance and real estate: 3.7%; Agriculture: 1.6%; (2010)
- Unemployment: ▼5.5% (October 2024)
- Average gross salary: ▼$17,192 annual (2024)
- Main industries: Pharmaceuticals, electronics, apparel, food products, tourism

External
- Exports: ▼$73.17 billion (2017 est.)
- Export goods: Chemicals, electronics, rum, beverage concentrates, medical equipment, canned tuna, apparel
- Main export partners: United States 76.5%; Belgium 6.1%; Netherlands 3.4%; Italy 1.7%; Spain 1.6%; (2016)
- Imports: $43.32 billion CIF (2016 est.)
- Import goods: chemicals, machinery and equipment, food, petroleum products, clothing, fish
- Main import partners: United States 55.6%; Ireland 13.4%; Singapore 6.1%; Switzerland 2.9%; South Korea 2.8%; (2016)
- Current account: $0 (2017 est.)
- Gross external debt: ▲$56.82 billion (31 December 2010, est.)

Public finance
- Government debt: ▲51.6% of GDP (2017 est.)
- Budget balance: −0.7% (of GDP) (2017 est.)
- Revenue: 9.268 billion (2017 est.)
- Spending: 9.974 billion (2017 est.)
- Credit rating: Standard & Poor's (Note: González (2014; in Spanish) "Según S&P, desde hoy la clasificación de los GOs será BB+. La perspectiva de los bonos es estable."); D
- All values, unless otherwise stated, are in US dollars.

The economy of Puerto Rico is classified as a high-income economy by the World Bank and as the most competitive economy in Latin America by the World Economic Forum. The main drivers of Puerto Rico's economy are manufacturing, which primarily includes pharmaceuticals, textiles, petrochemicals, and electronics; followed by the service industry, notably finance, insurance, real estate, and tourism. (Note: pr.gov (in Spanish) "La manufactura es el sector principal de la economía de Puerto Rico.") (Note: pr.gov (in Spanish) "Algunas de las industrias más destacadas dentro del sector de la manufactura son: las farmacéuticas, los textiles, los petroquímicos, las computadoras, la electrónica y las compañías dedicadas a la manufactura de instrumentos médicos y científicos, entre otros.")

The geography of Puerto Rico and its political status are both determining factors of its economic prosperity, primarily due to its relatively small size as an island, its lack of natural resources used to produce raw materials, and, consequently, its dependence on imports; as well as its relationship with the United States federal government, which controls its foreign policies while exerting trading restrictions, particularly in its shipping industry.

At the macroeconomic level, Puerto Rico has been experiencing an economic depression for 20 consecutive years, starting in 2006 after a series of negative cash flows and the expiration of section 936 that applied to Puerto Rico of the U.S. Internal Revenue Code. This section was critical for the economy of the island as it established tax exemptions for U.S. corporations that settled in Puerto Rico and allowed its subsidiaries operating in the island to send their earnings to the parent corporation at any time, without needing to pay federal tax on corporate income. Puerto Rico has, however, been able to maintain a relatively low inflation rate in the past decade.

Economists argue that most of Puerto Rico's economic woes stem from federal regulations that expired, have been repealed, or no longer apply to Puerto Rico; from its inability to become self-sufficient and self-sustainable throughout history; from its highly politicized public policy which tends to change whenever a political party gains power; as well as from its highly inefficient local government which has accrued a public debt equal to 66% of its gross domestic product over time. Despite these issues, the economy continues to gradually grow.

In comparison to the different states of the United States, Puerto Rico is poorer than Mississippi, the poorest state of the United States, with 45% of its population living below the poverty line. (Note: Quintero (2013; in Spanish) "Los indicadores de una economía débil son muchos, y la economía en Puerto Rico está sumamente debilitada, según lo evidencian la tasa de desempleo (13.5%), los altos niveles de pobreza (41.7%), los altos niveles de quiebra y la pérdida poblacional.") However, when compared to Latin America, Puerto Rico has the highest GDP per capita in the region. The Commonwealth has a massive bond debt that it is unable to service, $70 billion in early 2017, or $12,000 per capita, at a moment when its unemployment rate (8.0%, October 2018) is more than twice as large as the mainland's. The debt had been increasing during a decade-long recession. Proponents argue it is necessary for Puerto Rico to reach restructuring deals with creditors to avoid a bankruptcy-like process under PROMESA. More specifically, Puerto Rico has been in an unusual situation since 2016: its economy is under the supervision of a federal board that is managing finances and helping to get access again to capital markets.

The commonwealth has a modern infrastructure, a large public sector, and an institutional framework guided by the regulations of U.S. federal agencies, most of which have an active and continued presence in the island. Its main trading partners are the United States itself, Ireland, and Japan, with most products coming from East Asia, mainly from China, Hong Kong, and Taiwan. In 2016, additional trading partners were established, with Singapore, Switzerland and South Korea commencing import trades with Puerto Rico. At a global scale, Puerto Rico's dependency on oil for transportation and electricity generation, as well as its dependency on food imports and raw materials, makes Puerto Rico volatile and highly reactive to changes in the world economy and climate.

The "Jones Act," also known as the Merchant Marine Act of 1920, requires all goods transported between U.S. ports to be transported by U.S.-built vessels, owned by U.S. citizens, with an American crew, that fly the U.S. flag. The law has been criticized as a law contrary to the economic freedom of Puerto Rico.

An ongoing objective of the Puerto Rican government is to persuade international companies to relocate their manufacturing plants to Puerto Rico, where they would be exempt from customs duties.

In 2022, the United States Supreme Court held that the territorial clause of the U.S. Constitution affirm congressional authority in mandating "reasonable" tax and benefit schemes in Puerto Rico and the other territories that are different from the states, but the Court did not address the incorporated/unincorporated distinction. As a result, the status quo remains, so the U.S. government still defines the Commonwealth of Puerto Rico as a U.S. unincorporated territory.

== History ==
Puerto Rico, like many other economies, has transitioned from an agricultural economy to an industrial one.

=== Pre-colonialism ===
The economic history of Puerto Rico prior to the arrival of the Spaniards is not heavily documented. The part that is known about its inhabitants, the Taíno, is that their economy was a mixture of hunting and gathering with agriculture. They inhabited the island for centuries before the arrival of the Spanish in 1493 marked the beginning of their extinction.

The Taíno captured and ate small animals, such as mammals, earthworms, lizards, turtles, and birds. Manatees were speared and fish were caught in nets, speared, poisoned, trapped in weirs, or caught with hook and line. Wild parrots were decoyed with domesticated birds, and iguanas were taken from trees and other vegetation. Livestock husbandry was not practiced as there were no large animals native to Puerto Rico that could be raised in an agricultural setting in order to produce commodities such as food, fiber or labor.

Fields for important root crops, such as yuca, were prepared by heaping up mounds of soil, called conucos. This improved soil drainage and fertility, as well as delaying erosion, and it allowed for longer storage of crops in the ground. Other crops, such as corn, were raised in simple clearings created by slash-and-burn technique. Typically, conucos were three feet high and nine feet in circumference and were arranged in rows. The primary root crop was yuca/cassava, a woody shrub cultivated for its edible and starchy tuberous root. It was planted using a coa, a kind of hoe made completely from wood. Women processed the poisonous variety of cassava by squeezing it to extract the toxic juices. Then they would grind the roots into flour for baking bread. Batata (sweet potato) was another important root crop.

Corn was cooked and eaten off the cob. The Taíno also grew squash, beans, peppers, peanuts and pineapples. Tobacco, calabashes (West Indian pumpkins) and cotton were grown around the houses. Other fruits and vegetables, such as palm nuts, guavas and Zamia roots were collected from the wild.

=== Spanish rule ===
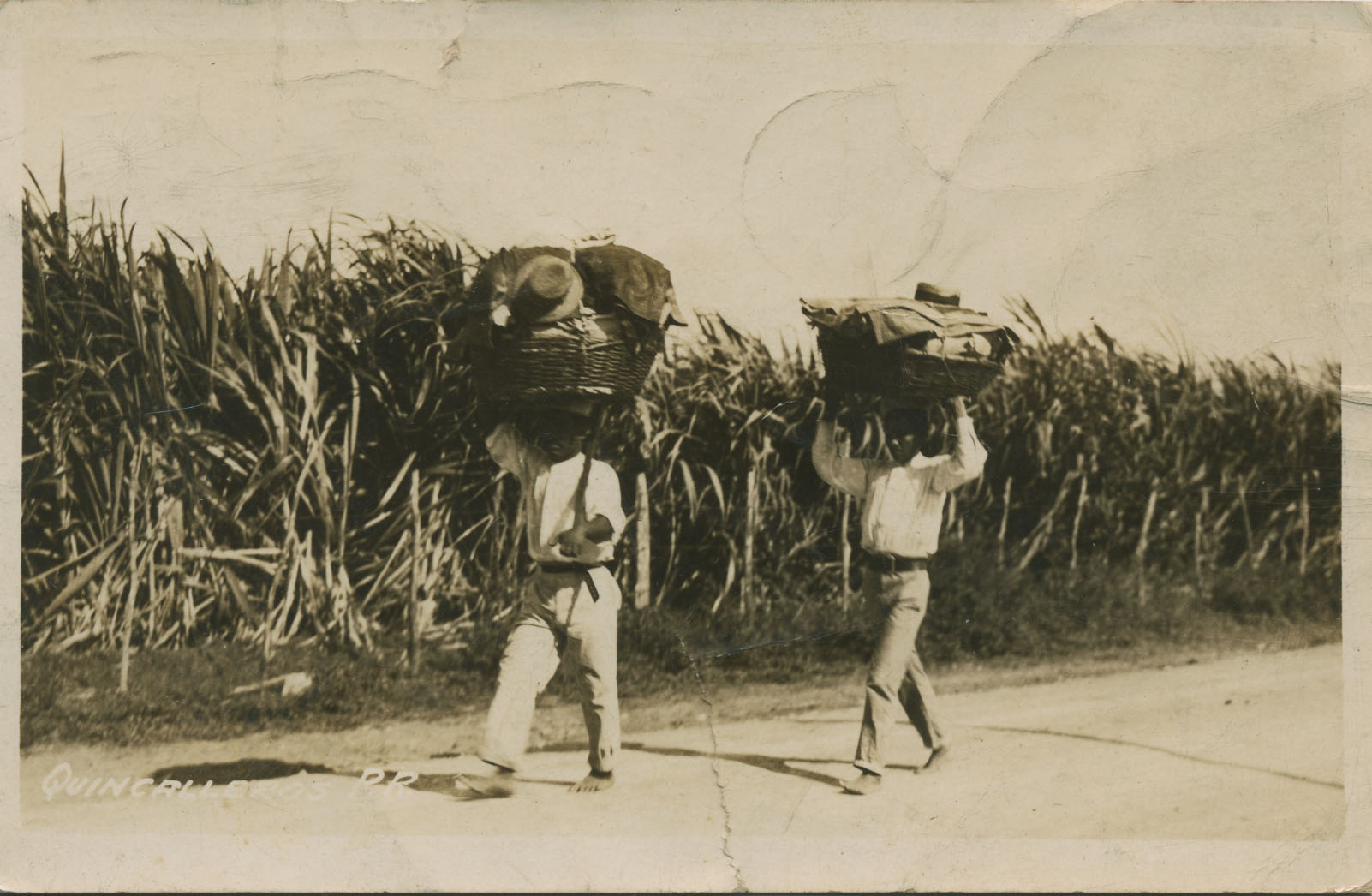
Merchants in Puerto Rico, circa 1900-1917

The economy of Puerto Rico was transformed drastically upon the arrivals of Spaniards in 1493 until their departure in 1898. Although Spain was initially drawn to Puerto Rico due to its gold deposits, the deposits were found to be small and they depleted quickly. Spain's interest in Puerto Rico after that point was primarily tactical and strategic.

The economy during that period was driven by slavery of the native population, the Taíno, and by slaves brought from Africa. Slaves were minimally remunerated for or forced to work in farms, mines, households, and other aspects. Agriculture was the primary mean of production, as well as livestock which was originally imported from Europe. Sugar cane, tobacco, coffee, cocoa and minor fruits were the primary cultivations which were exported to Europe and, by so, constituted the main economy for the island. Mining of gold, silver, and copper occurred as well, although not as much as in other territories during the Spanish colonization of the Americas.

The financial administration of Puerto Rico was directly from Madrid, although there were limited elements of home rule. Taxation under Spanish rule entailed stamp taxes on transfers of property and consumption taxes on foodstuff.

=== United States rule ===
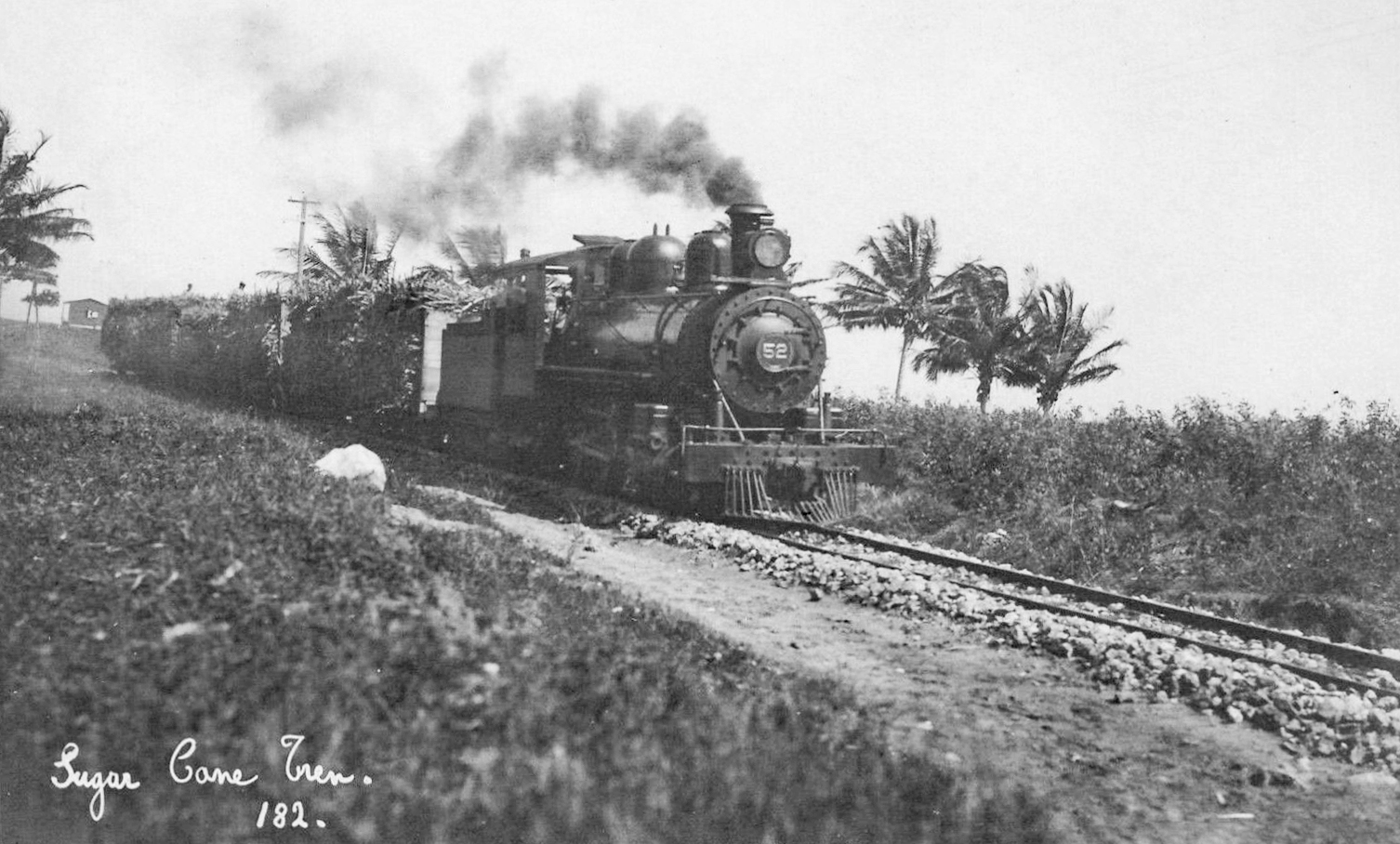
A train transporting Sugar Cane in Puerto Rico, c. 1911

In the early 20th century the greatest contributor to Puerto Rico's economy was agriculture and its main crop was sugar, displacing other cash crops such as tobacco, cocoa, and coffee. In 1935, United States President Franklin D. Roosevelt launched the Puerto Rican Reconstruction Administration, which provided agricultural development, public works, and electrification of the island. After the end of Spanish rule, Puerto Rico's fiscal administration was reformed.

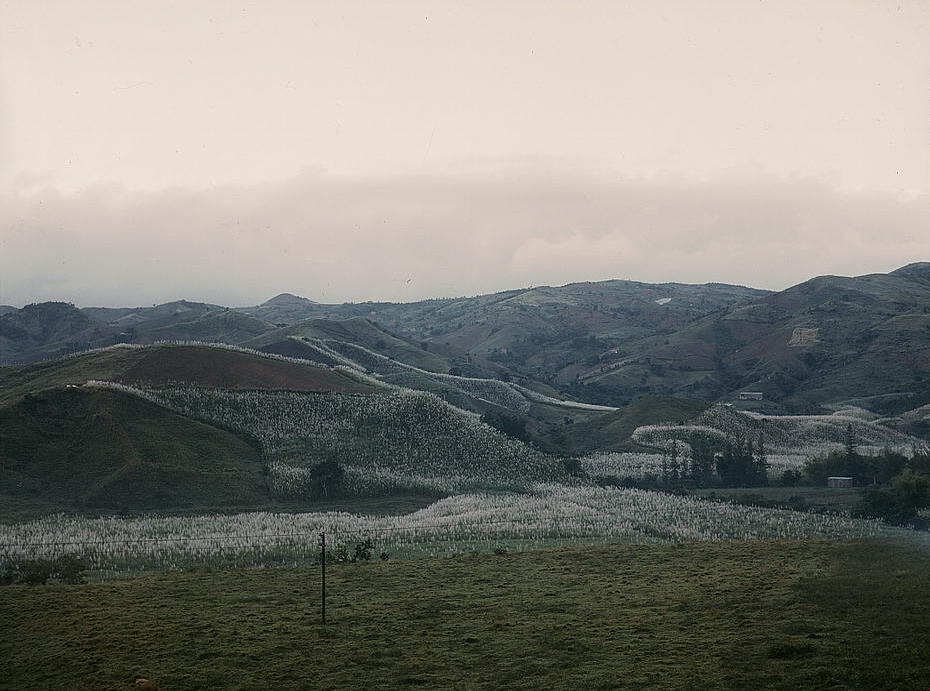
Growing tobacco in 1941 in Puerto Rico

Economic conditions had improved since the Great Depression because of external investment in capital-intensive industries such as petrochemicals, pharmaceuticals and technology. Starting in the late 1940s a series of projects called Operation Bootstrap encouraged the establishment of factories using tax exemptions. Thus manufacturing replaced agriculture as the main industry of the island. Operation Bootstrap was based on an "industrialization-first" campaign and modernization, focusing the Puerto Rican economy on exports, especially to the United States. As a result, Puerto Rico is now classified as a "high income country" by the World Bank. Although initially there were large gains in employment and per capita income, recessions in the United States were magnified in the country and have repeatedly hampered Puerto Rican development.

With the signing of the North American Free Trade Agreement and the Dominican Republic–Central America Free Trade Agreement, Puerto Rico lost a trade advantage over some Latin American countries as the right to duty-free imports to the U.S. market were expanded. Following the Fair Minimum Wage Act of 2007, Puerto Rico is also subject to the minimum wage laws of the United States, which gives lower-wage countries such as Mexico and the Dominican Republic an economic advantage in the Caribbean. Once the beneficiary of special tax treatment from the U.S. government, today local industries must compete with those in more economically depressed parts of the world where wages are not subject to U.S. minimum wage legislation. In recent years, some U.S. and foreign owned factories have moved to lower wage countries in Latin America and Asia. Puerto Rico is subject to U.S. trade laws and restrictions.

Also, starting around 1950, there was extensive migration from Puerto Rico to the Continental United States, particularly with Puerto Ricans moving to New York City, in search of better economic conditions. Puerto Rican migration to New York displayed an average yearly migration of 1,800 for the years 1930–1940, 31,000 for 1946–1950, 45,000 for 1951–1960, and a peak of 75,000 in 1953. As of 2003, the U.S. Census Bureau estimates that more people of Puerto Rican birth or ancestry live in the U.S. than in Puerto Rico.

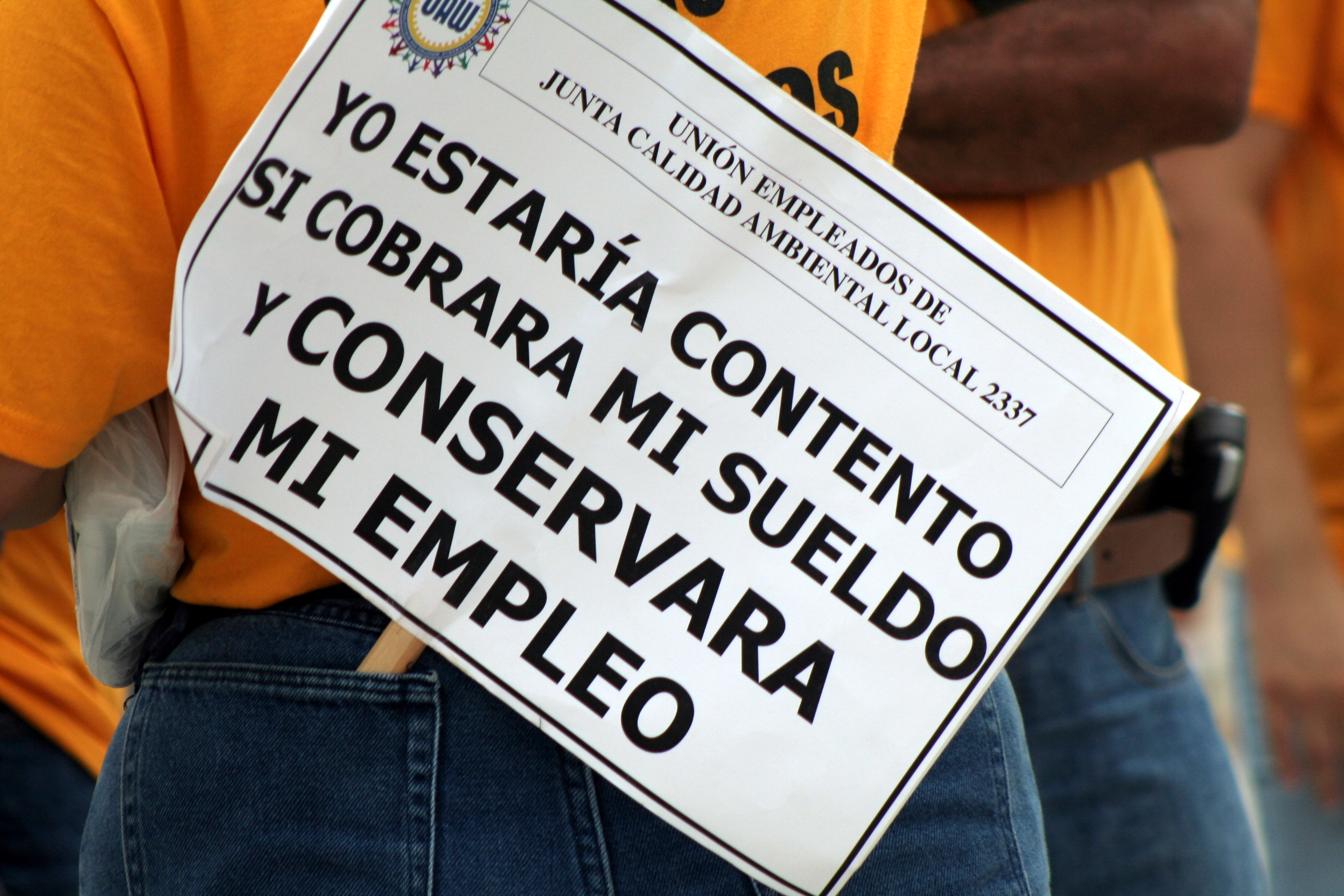
I'd be happy to receive my salary and save my job; a plea after the government shut-down in Puerto Rico in 2006

On 1 May 2006, the Puerto Rican government faced significant shortages in cash flows, which forced the closure of the local Department of Education and 42 other government agencies. All 1,536 public schools closed, and 95,762 people were furloughed in the first-ever partial shutdown of the government in the island's history. On 10 May 2006, the budget crisis was resolved with a new tax reform agreement so that all government employees could return to work. On 15 November 2006, a 5.5% sales tax was implemented. Municipalities are required by law to apply a municipal sales tax of 1.5% bringing the total sales tax to 7%.

The public debt of Puerto Rico has grown at a faster pace than the growth of its economy, reaching $46.7 billion in 2008. In January 2009, Luis Fortuño enacted several measures aimed at eliminating the government's $3.3 billion deficit, including laying off 12,505 government employees. Puerto Rico's unemployment rate was 15.9 percent in January 2010. Some analysts said they expect the government's layoffs to propel that rate to 17 percent.

In November 2010, Governor Fortuño proposed a tax reform plan that would be implemented in a six-year period, retroactive to 1 January 2010. The first phase, applicable to year 2010, reduces taxes to all individual taxpayers by 7–15%. By year 2016, average relief for individual taxpayers will represent a 50% tax cut and a 30% cut for corporate taxpayers, whose tax rate will be lowered from 41 to 30%.

The President Task Force on Puerto Rico Status recognizes that the status question and the economy are intimately linked. Many participants in the forums conducted by the Task Force argued that uncertainty about status is holding Puerto Rico back in economic areas. And although there are a number of economic actions that should be taken immediately or in the short term, regardless of the ultimate outcome of the status question, identifying the most effective means of assisting the Puerto Rican economy depends on resolving the ultimate question of status. In short, the long-term economic well-being of Puerto Rico would be dramatically improved by an early decision on the status question.

During fiscal year (FY-2012), the Consolidated Budget for the archipelago, including both direct transfers from federal programs (Social Security and Medicare benefits for workers, Veteran's benefits, Pell Grants and student loan's interest subsidies and miscellaneous temporary appropriations -e.g. American Recovery and Reinvestment Act of 2009 grants totalling $2.6 billion-) represented more than $28.7 billion, or approximately 30% of its GDP, while revenues surpassed $31 billion. In 2010, federal transfers amounted $16.710 billion, while the Commonwealth's government managed funds of $10.12 billion.

In June 2013, a $300 million US Medicaid payment to Puerto Rico was delayed because the Puerto Rican Government had changed their nationally sponsored insurance carrier without obtaining approval from the US Health and Human Services Department. This one of several troubling economic developments, including high debt to population ratios that have caused consternation in the US municipal bond market.

Puerto Rico has been experiencing an economic depression for 20 consecutive years, starting in 2006 after a series of negative cash flows and the expiration of the section 936, that applied to Puerto Rico, of the U.S. Internal Revenue Code. In 2014, it was still in an economic depression.

Section 936 was critical for the economy as it established tax exemptions for U.S. corporations that settled in Puerto Rico and allowed its subsidiaries operating on the island to send their earnings to the parent corporation at any time, without paying federal tax on corporate income. The government has also experienced 26 consecutive negative cash flows since 2000, exacerbating its fragile economic situation as the government is forced to incur into new debt in order to pay the old one. (Note: Walsh (2013) "In each of the last six years, Puerto Rico sold hundreds of millions of dollars of new bonds just to meet payments on its older, outstanding bonds—a red flag. It also sold $2.5 billion worth of bonds to raise cash for its troubled pension system—a risky practice—and it sold still more long-term bonds to cover its yearly budget deficits.")

Puerto Rico has, however, surprisingly been able to maintain a relatively low inflation in the past decade. Academically, most of Puerto Rico's economic woes stem from federal regulations that expired, have been repealed, or no longer apply to Puerto Rico; its inability to become self-sufficient and self-sustainable throughout history; its public policy which tends to change whenever a political party gains power; as well as its slightly inefficient local government, which has accrued a public debt equal to 66% of its gross domestic product throughout time.

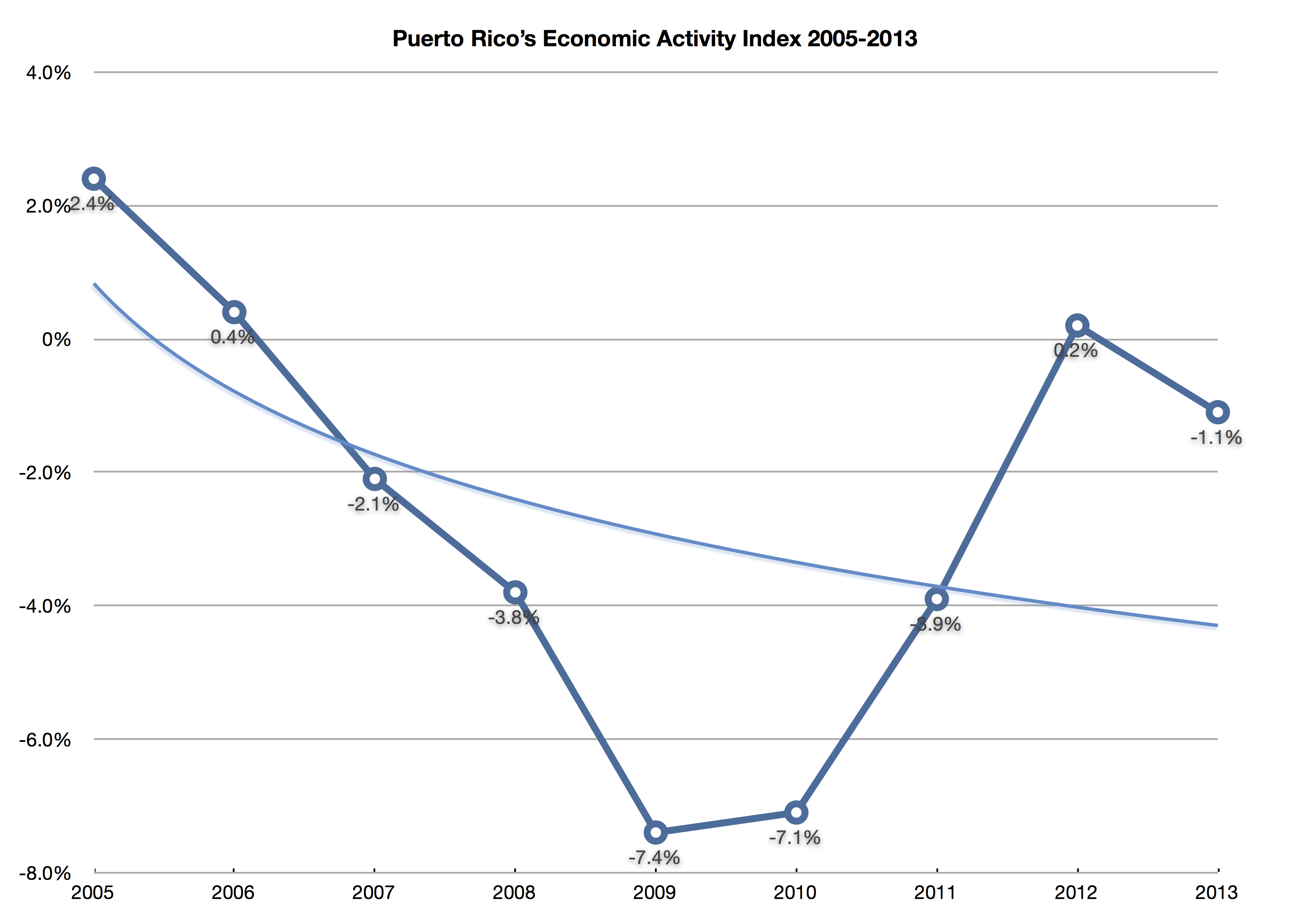
Puerto Rico's Economic Activity Index for FY 2005–2013 evidences its depression.

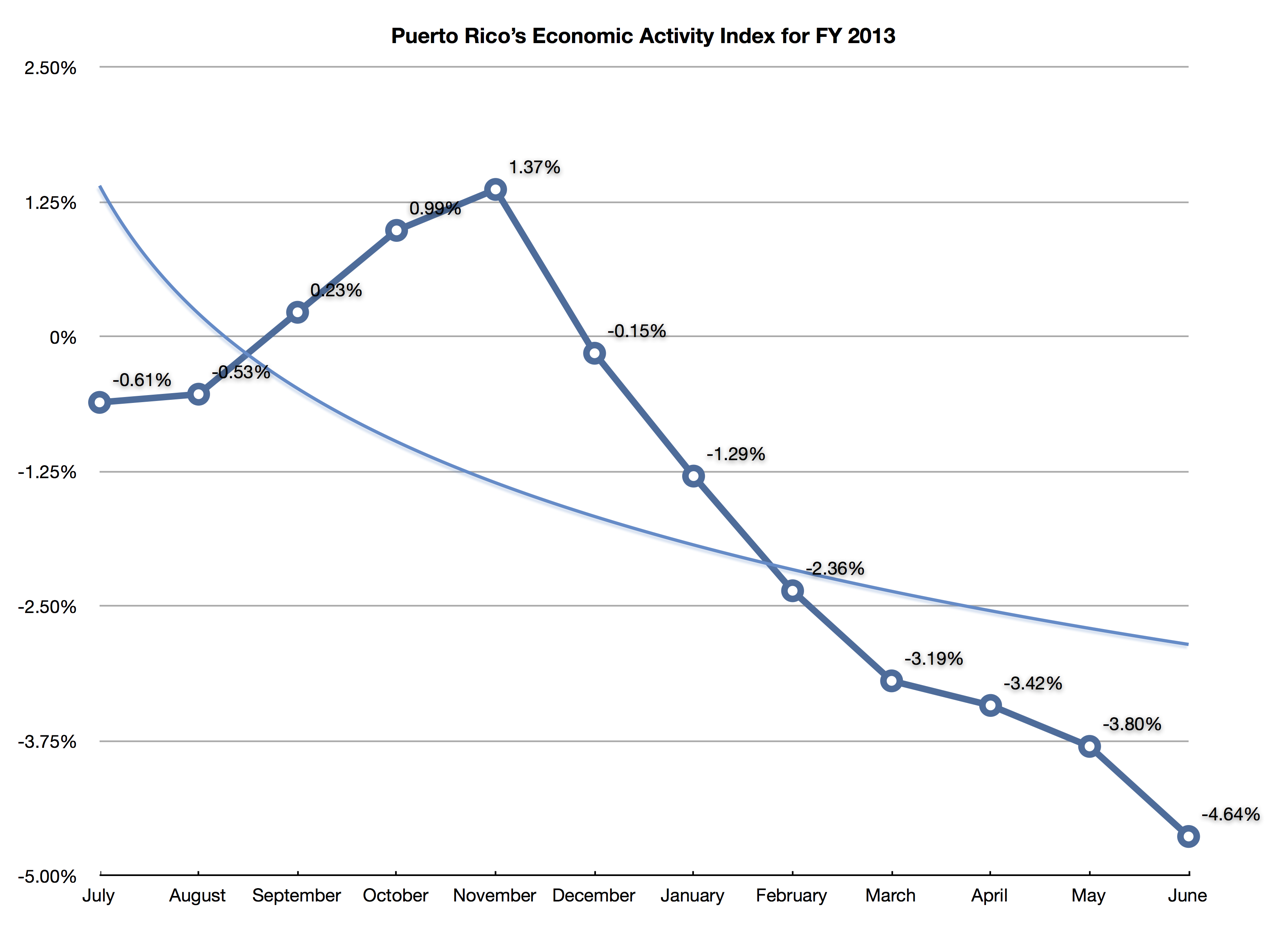
Puerto Rico's month-over-month Economic Activity Index for FY2013 evidences its sluggishness and decline.

By mid January 2017, the debt had reached $70 billion or $12,000 per capita in a territory with a 45 percent poverty rate and double digit unemployment that is more than twice the mainland U.S. average. It is essential for Puerto Rico to reach restructuring deals with creditors to avoid a bankruptcy-like process under PROMESA. In late January, the federal control board gave the Government of Puerto Rico until 28 February to present a fiscal plan (including negotiations with creditors) to solve the problems. A moratorium on lawsuits by debtors was extended to 31 May.

Governor Ricardo Rosselló strongly favored statehood for Puerto Rico, thinking in particular on the financial benefits statehood would offer. These include an additional $10 billion per year in federal funds, the right to vote in presidential elections, higher Social Security and Medicare benefits, and a right for its government agencies and municipalities to file for bankruptcy. A fifth plebiscite is due to be held on 11 June 2017. The two options at that time will be "Statehood" and "Independence/Free Association". It will be the first referendum not to offer the choice of "Commonwealth". Regardless of the outcome, Congress will be the body to make the final decision on the status of Puerto Rico.

A review of the economic situation in May 2017 by the Official Monetary and Financial Institutions Forum, an independent think tank, led to a warning that the planned "draconian budget-tightening" would cut up to 6% of the island's GNP over the next four years, leading to continuing decline. "Puerto Rico urgently needs an International Monetary Fund-style programme involving debt relief in return for a commitment to far-reaching reforms ... that will facilitate growth", the group concluded.

Then Hurricane Maria struck the island on 20 September 2017, destroying infrastructure, causing great loss of life, and leading to a large exodus of residents. The 2020 census showed the population of Puerto Rico dropping by 11.8%.

In August 2023, Governor Pedro Pierluisi floats a proposed resolution that would extend many of the benefits of Act 22 to all Puerto Ricans, but it risks being rejected by the U.S. Congress as part of the bankruptcy of the Commonwealth of Puerto Rico. The only merit of this proposal is that it would correct a fundamental inequity in the tax code.

In January 2024, the State of Puerto Rico relaxed its remote work requirements with Act 52-2022, which exempts foreign employers with no connection to Puerto Rico from withholding income tax for employees working remotely in Puerto Rico, provided certain conditions are met.

In April 2025, Nydia Velázquez of New York State introduced legislation aimed at eliminating Puerto Rico's appeal as a tax haven for cryptocurrencies. The bill would add a provision to the U.S. Internal Revenue Code requiring that digital asset income earned by Puerto Rican residents be taxed under the same federal rules as income earned in the U.S. mainland.

On April 30, 2025, the Fiscal Board asked the government for a plan to "free itself" from dependence on federal funds. The fiscal agency requested the establishment of a centralized office for the use of federal funds, for which funds have been allocated since 2022, but none have materialized.

In June 2025, Puerto Rico Senate President Thomas Rivera Schatz introduced a resolution demanding that the United States Congress and the President of the United States dissolve the Puerto Rico Fiscal Oversight Board.

== Sectors ==
The economy of Puerto Rico is mainly driven by manufacturing, primarily pharmaceuticals, textiles, petrochemicals, and electronics; followed by the service industry, primarily finance, insurance, real estate, and tourism.

=== Primary sector ===
==== Agriculture ====
Agriculture constitutes about US$808 million or about 0.8% of the island's gross domestic product (GDP). However, Puerto Rico imports 85% of its food even though most of the land is fertile. Only a mere 6% is arable; a fact that poses a direct threat to Puerto Rico's food security. This perplexing situation has been caused due to a shift in priorities towards industrialization, bureaucratization, mismanagement of terrains, lack of alternative methods, and a deficient agricultural workforce. Puerto Rico's geographical location within the Caribbean exacerbates these issues, making the scarce existing crops vulnerable to the devastating effects of Atlantic hurricanes.

The following fruits are industrially cultivated and widely consumed:

- acerola (acerola)
- avocado (aguacate)
- banana (guineo)
- coconut (coco)
- grapefruit (toronja)
- guava (guayaba)
- guinep (quenepa)
- lemon (limón)
- mango (mangó)
- olives (aceitunas)
- papaya (papaya)
- pineapple (piña)
- plantain (plátano)
- pumpkin (calabaza)
- red banana (guineo manzano)
- soursop (guanábana)
- tamarind (tamarindo)

Apples (manzanas), bananas (guineos), grapes (uvas), oranges (chinas), and watermelons (melones) are imported, as well as some of the aforementioned cultivated fruits.

Grains cultivated industrially and widely consumed include barley (cebada), maize (maíz), rice (arroz), rye (centeno), and wheat (trigo). Legumes include black beans (habichuelas negras), chickpea (garbanzo), kidney beans (habichuelas rojas), pea (pitipuá), pigeon peas (gandules), and pink beans (habichuelas rosadas). Tubers include cassava (yuca), eddoe (malanga), potatoes (papas), sweet potatoes (batata), taro (yautía), and yams (ñame).

Vegetables include asparagus (espárragos), cabbage (repollo), cauliflower (coliflor), carrots (zanahorias), chayote (chayote), cucumber (pepinillo), eggplant (berenjena), lettuce (lechuga), onions (cebolla), and peppers (ají).

Herbs include basil (albahaca), bay leaves (hojas de laurel), cilantro (cilantrillo), culantro (culantro), and parsley (perejil). Spices include achiote (achiote), cinnamon (canela), cloves (clavos), garlic (ajo), ginger (jengibre), and paprika (sazón).

Rum and beer are types of liquor that are produced in Puerto Rico, in rum's case, using sugar canes.

Recent studies have suggested there is a lack of young farmers and that 65% of the island's agriculture force is over 55 years of age. The decrease in new farmers will have significant negative effects on the island.

Fishery is common in all coastal towns but Puerto Rico does not have enough wild fisheries to supply the demand required to sustain a profitable fishing industry. There are no industrial fish farms on the island either. Common fish consumed by residents include cod (bacalao), mahi-mahi (pez dorado), marlin (marlín), salmon (salmón), snapper (chillo), trunkfish (chapín), and tuna (atún). Other seafood includes clams (almejas), crabs (cangrejos), lobsters (langostas), mussels (mejillones), octopuses (pulpo), oysters (ostras), and squids (calamares). It is quite common for restaurants on the coast to serve fresh seafood.

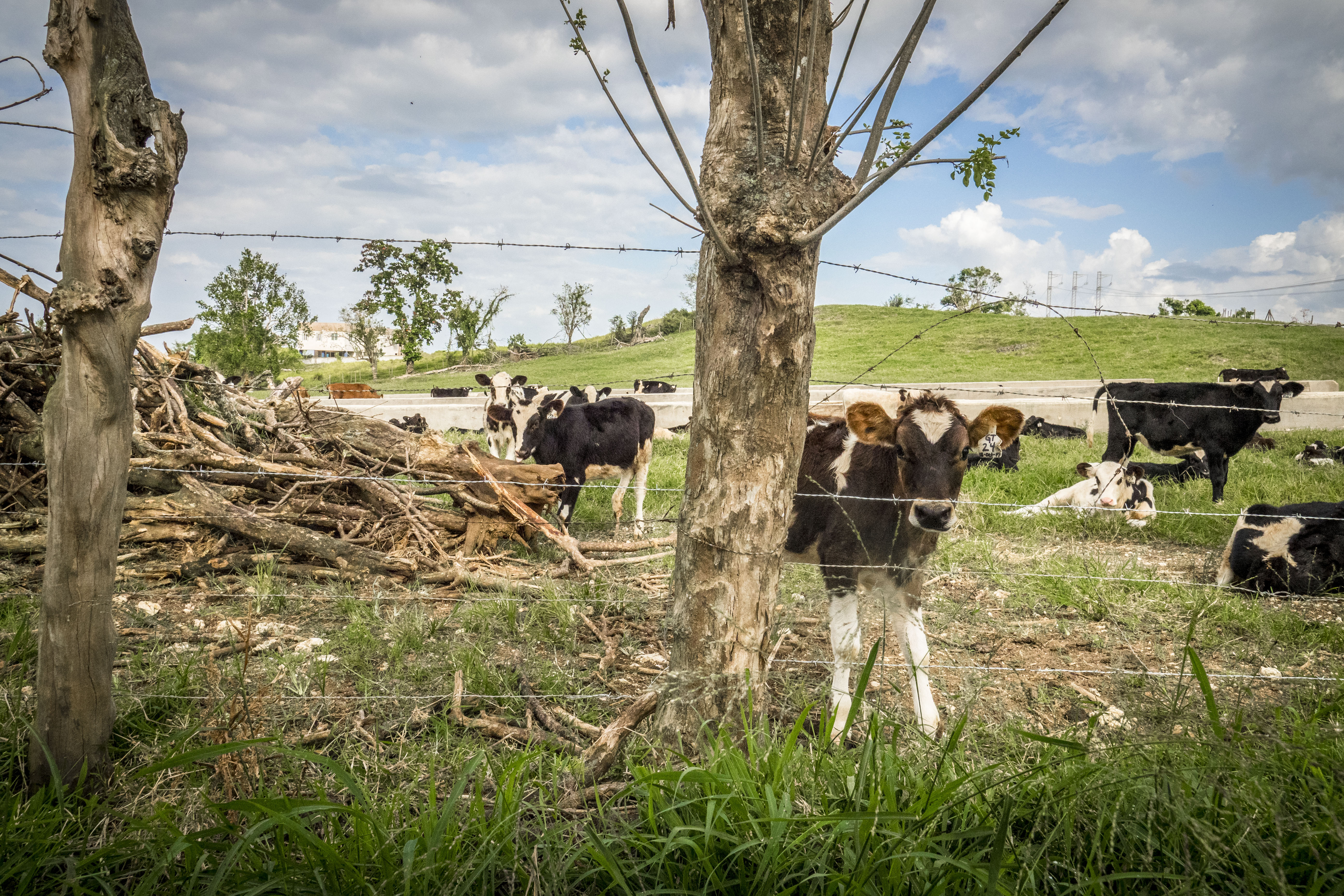
Cows in Arecibo, Puerto Rico

Livestock used for food includes cattle, goats, pigs, and rabbits. Donkeys, horses, and mules are strictly used for labor or recreation as consumption is frowned upon culturally by locals. Cattle is used for both meat and dairy with a strong and self-sufficient local milk industry through processors such as Suiza Dairy and Tres Monjitas. Poultry includes chickens, ducks, geese, turkeys, and quail. The pet industry is one of the only two industries experiencing consistent significant growth on the island with dogs, cats, fishkeeping, canaries, parakeets, and parrots being quintessential in homes. Consumption of animals commonly used as pets is frowned upon culturally save for rabbits.

The Fall Armyworm is a highly polyphagous and economically significant pest here. See Puerto Rico Fall Armyworm.

==== Forestry ====
Almost all wood used on the island is imported even though a study conducted more than two decades ago by the U.S. Forest Service concluded that local soil could sustain a lumber industry if the proper species were used. Regardless of this, several small sawmills do exist on the island.

==== Mining ====
There are some metal deposits of copper, gold, lead, silver, zinc, and molybdenum on the island but they are not large enough to sustain a profitable mining industry. Mismanagement of terrains and poor urban planning has made it difficult for the mining industry to thrive as well, as many deposits are directly below or nearby residential complexes. Puerto Rico also possesses industries of lime, marble, salt, cement, clay, crushed stone, dimension stone, industrial sand, gravel, and stone. The cement industry is tracked meticulously as it has shown to be highly correlated to the GDP of the island.

=== Secondary sector ===
Manufacturing is the largest economic sector of the island; composing almost half (about 46%) of its gross domestic product (GDP) through more than 2,000 manufacturing plants scattered throughout the island. All manufacturers in Puerto Rico are in some way interconnected with the Puerto Rico Industrial Development Company (PRIDCO) which provides substantial incentives for companies that manufacture in Puerto Rico. Manufacturers are also voluntarily interconnected through the Puerto Rico Manufacturers Association which serves as their primary trade association and their main lobby group upon the Legislative Assembly of Puerto Rico. Most manufacturing in Puerto Rico today is the product of Operation Bootstrap.

In terms of specialization, more than half of all manufacturing done in Puerto Rico is attributed to the pharmaceutical industry which generates more than 18,000 jobs, pays more than US $3 billion in taxes, comprise about half of total exports, and has generated more than 25% of the island's GDP for the past four decades. Comparatively, Puerto Rico boasts the second largest pharmaceutical manufacturing output in the United States and is the fifth largest area in the world for pharmaceutical manufacturing with more than 80 plants, including:

- Abbott
- Amgen
- AstraZeneca
- Baxter
- BD
- Biovail
- Bristol Myers Squibb
- Cardinal Health
- CooperVision
- Eli Lilly
- GlaxoSmithKline (gsk)
- Ivax
- Johnson & Johnson
- Merck Sharp & Dohme
- Mylan
- Novartis
- Patheon
- Pfizer
- Procter & Gamble
- Schering Plough
- Warner Chilcott
- Watson
- Wyeth

Puerto Rico is also the third-largest biotechnology manufacturer with more than two million square feet and the seventh-largest medical-device exporter with more than 50 plants. Pharmaceutical companies originally came to Puerto Rico in the late 1960s and 1970s to take advantage of the federal tax incentive known as Section 936. This incentive allowed U.S.-based manufacturers to send all profits from local plants to stateside parent plants without having to pay any federal taxes. These tax breaks were phased out over ten years starting in 1995, and so were eliminated in 2006. Expired patents, cheaper manufacturers (such as those in Brazil, China, India, and South Korea), the rise of generic drugs, and high production costs now also pose a challenge to the industry. As of 2014, Puerto Rico produces 16 of the top 20-selling drugs in the mainland United States. The Island also produces 7 of the 10 best-selling medicines in the world. In recent years, major U.S. biopharmaceutical companies have invested billions into manufacturing capabilities in Puerto Rico. In 2025, Amgen committed $650 million to expand its Juncos facility, while Eli Lilly pledged $1.2 billion to upgrade and modernize its manufacturing site in Carolina.

The aeronautical industry is relatively young on the island and concentrates mostly on the northwestern corridor composed by Aguadilla and Isabela. These municipalities serve as local headquarters for Honeywell Aerospace, Lufthansa, and Pratt & Whitney. GE Aviation, Lockheed Martin, and Raytheon also have presence on the island although their local operations do not focus on aeronautics but rather focus on business support.

Education in aeronautics is provided by the Caribbean Aviation Training Institute and the Interamerican University of Puerto Rico. The University of Puerto Rico, Mayaguez Campus (UPRM), the Polytechnic University of Puerto Rico (PUPR), and the Turabo University graduate most of the engineers on the island.

=== Tertiary sector ===
==== Finance ====
The financial sector is of great prominence, accounting for 5.75% of Puerto Rico's Gross National Product (GNP) in 2010. Similar to any other state of the union, Puerto Rico's financial sector is also fully integrated into the U.S. financial system. Federal regulations govern the sector, being a constituent part of the jurisdiction of the Federal Reserve Bank of New York, responsible for implementing monetary policy enacted by members of the Federal Reserve Board in Washington, D.C. throughout the United States.

==== Real estate ====
The real estate industry constitutes about 14.8% of the GDP, about 1% of all of the employee compensation on the island and, together with finance and insurance (FIRE), about 3.7% of all the employment on the jurisdiction. (Note: JP (2013; in Spanish) "Bienes Raíces y Renta: 14,867.6; PRODUCTO INTERNO BRUTO: 100,195.9") (Note: JP (2013; in Spanish) Bienes Raíces y Renta, Compensación a empleados: 574.2; INGRESO NACIONAL NETO, Compensación a empleados: 30,102.4") (Note: JP (2013; in Spanish) "Finanzas, seguros y bienes raíces: 39; TOTAL: 1,047")

==== Tourism ====
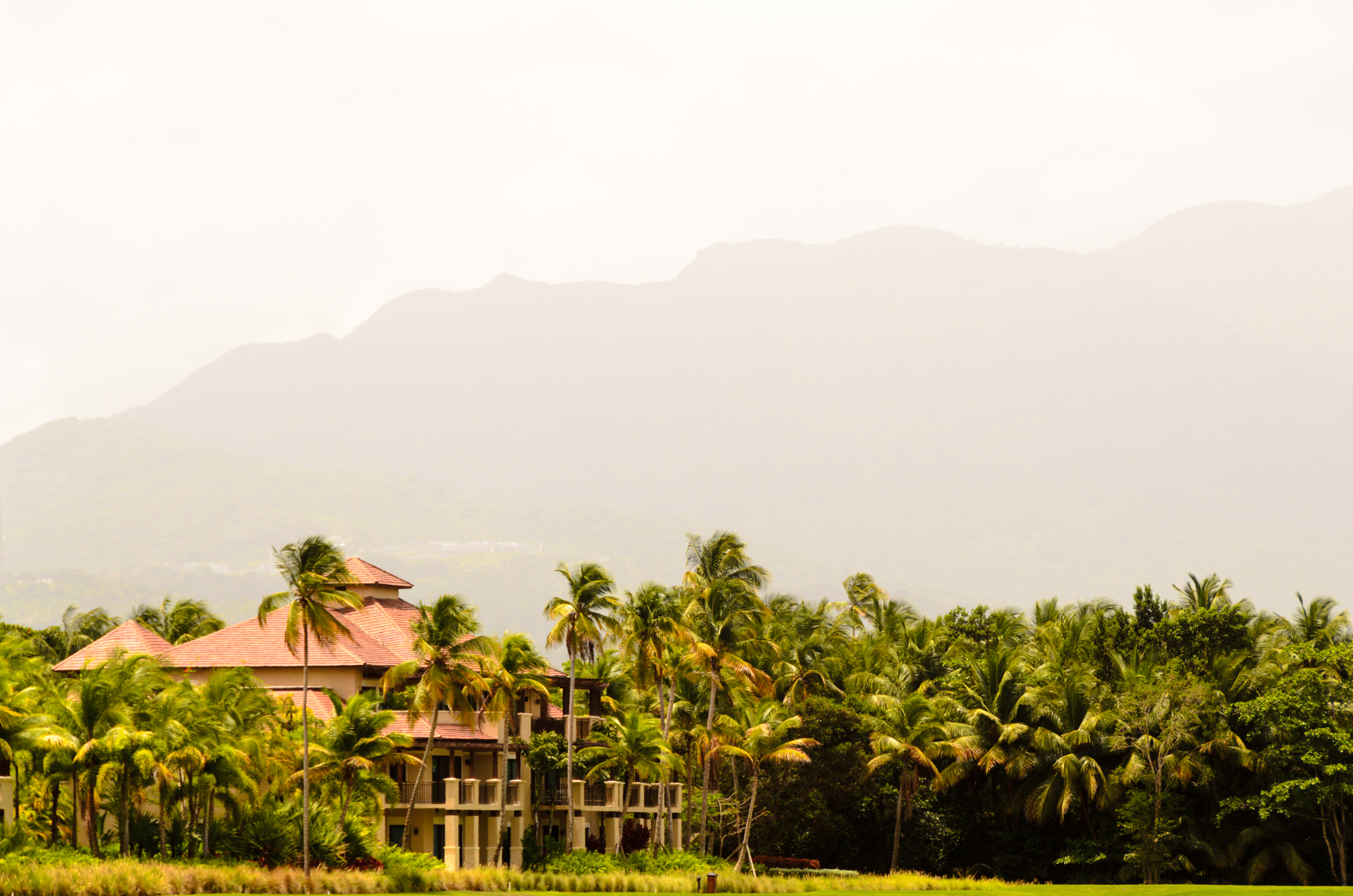
St Regis Bahia Beach Resort in Puerto Rico view of El Yunque

Tourism is an important component of the Puerto Rican economy supplying an approximate US$1.8 billion per year. In 1999, an estimated five million tourists visited the island, most from the United States. Nearly a third of these were cruise ship passengers. An increase in hotel registrations, which has been observed since 1998, and the construction of new hotels and the Puerto Rico Convention Center are indicators of the current strength of the tourism industry. In 2009, tourism accounted for nearly 7% of the islands' gross national product.

The following includes some public and private projects aimed at increasing the tourism industry in Puerto Rico:

- Camuy River Cave Park
- Condado
- Condado Vanderbilt Hotel
- El Yunque National Forest
- Flamenco Beach
- Fort San Felipe del Morro
- Isla Verde
- José Miguel Agrelot Coliseum
- La Concha Resort
- Luis Muñoz Marín International Airport
- Old San Juan
- Plaza Las Américas
- Ponce Art Museum
- Puerto Rico Convention Center
- The Mall of San Juan
- Cuevas Las Cabachuelas

The gambling sector is also important to the economy (employing 3,409 people, 2017), and it encompasses 20 casinos all attached to hotels and resorts acting as tourist destinations. This is mandatory, according to Laws of Puerto Rico, casinos must be attached to hotels and resorts, and must be located within "zonas históricas, antiguas o de interés turístico" – historically important zones of tourism. There is a significant and growing Chinese presence in the Puerto Rico gambling sector, so far 10% of the casinos are owned by Chinese individuals or companies, and more are partially owned. In 2019, contribution of travel and tourism to GDP (% of GDP) for Puerto Rico was 6.9%. However, the exact contribution of the gambling sector within the tourism and travel sector is not measured separately by the government.

==== Trade ====
As an unincorporated territory of the United States, travel and trade between Puerto Rico and either the U.S. mainland or other U.S. territories are not subject to international border controls. However, all goods moving from Puerto Rico to the U.S. mainland are subject to agricultural inspection controls by the U.S. Department of Agriculture (USDA). Travelers and goods move without restriction between Puerto Rico and other U.S. territories such as U.S. Virgin Islands. Travel and trade between Puerto Rico and territory outside U.S. jurisdiction are subject to international border controls.

Mail bound for the mainland from Puerto Rico and Hawaii is subject to USDA inspection for quarantined plant matter.

Puerto Rico may collect import duties only to the same degree it taxes the same goods produced domestically.

Puerto Rico receives cross-over subsidies, which generated approximately $371 million in 2008.

Puerto Rico's Imports and Exports from 2005 to 2013 (in millions)
Year	Imports	Change	Exports	Change	Balance	Ratio	Total	Change
2005	$41,911	▲ / 9.5%	$56,995	▲ / 3.5%	$15,084	▼ / 15.25%	$ / 98,905	▲ / 6.0%
2006	$43,858	▲ / 4.6%	$59,404	▲ / 4.2%	$15,546	▼ / 15.05%	$103,262	▲ / 4.4%
2007	$44,917	▲ / 2.4%	$62,558	▲ / 5.3%	$17,641	▲ / 16.41%	$107,474	▲ / 4.1%
2008	$43,422	▼ / -3.3%	$63,800	▲ / 2.0%	$20,378	▲ / 19.01%	$107,223	▼ / -0.2%
2009	$40,113	▼ / -7.6%	$59,726	▼ / -6.4%	$19,613	▲ / 19.64%	$ / 99,840	▼ / -6.9%
2010	$41,429	▲ / 3.3%	$68,555	▲ / 14.8%	$27,126	▲ / 24.66%	$109,984	▲ / 10.2%
2011	$47,031	▲ / 13.5%	$57,616	▼ / -16.0%	$10,585	▼ / 10.12%	$104,647	▼ / -4.9%
2012	$46,067	▼ / -2.1%	$58,805	▲ / 2.1%	$12,738	▲ / 12.15%	$104,871	▲ / 0.2%
2013	$43,805	▼ / -4.9%	$61,920	▲ / 5.3%	$18,115	▲ / 17.13%	$105,726	▲ / 0.8%

Similar to other states of the union, Puerto Rico is subject to trade agreements signed by the United States. As an unincorporated territory, the commonwealth is restricted from joining international organizations without the consent of the United States due to its current political status. (Note: Caribbean Business (2013) "An internal agency memo from a decade ago said: 'Under the U.S. Constitution, the federal government has the sole responsibility for the conduct of U.S. foreign relations, and this includes the foreign relations that relate to U.S. territories.'") However, due to its geographical and cultural nature, the U.S. Department of State allows Puerto Rico to participate in a limited number of international organizations to which it would potentially belong if Puerto Rico were a sovereign state. (Note: Caribbean Business (2013) "The U.S. State Department has previously given the green-light to Puerto Rico's active participation in limited international forums.")

Organizations to which Puerto Rico belongs under consent by the United States
Name	Abbreviation	Category	Status
Caribbean Community	CARICOM	regional	observer
Caribbean Tourism Organization	CTO	tourism	observer
Organization of American States	OAS	continental	observer
United Nations Economic Commission for Latin America and the Caribbean	ECLAC	regional	associate member (Note: ECLAC defines an 'associate member' as a non-independent territory.)

Countries with whom Puerto Rico can freely engage in trade without diplomatic restrictions
Country	Region	Agreement	Established trade promotion office in foreign country
Australia	Oceania	AUSFTA	No
Bahrain	Western Asia	USBFTA	No
Canada	North America	NAFTA	No
Chile	South America	ChFTA	No
Colombia	South America	CFTA	Yes
Costa Rica	Central America	CAFTA	No
Dominican Republic	Caribbean	CAFTA	Yes
El Salvador	Central America	CAFTA	No
Guatemala	Central America	CAFTA	No
Honduras	Central America	CAFTA	No
Israel	Western Asia	USIFTA	No
Jordan	Western Asia	USJFTA	No
Mexico	North America	NAFTA	No
Morocco	North Africa	USMFTA	No
Nicaragua	Central America	CAFTA	No
Oman	Western Asia	OFTA	No
Panama	Central America	PTPA	Yes
Peru	South America	USPTPA	Yes
Singapore	Southeast Asia	USSFTA	No
South Korea	East Asia	KFTA	No
United States	North America	NAFTA	Yes

=== Quaternary sector ===
Entrepreneurship and research & development (R&D) is relatively young on the island but has become increasingly important for its economy due to its downturn. Companies like Neolpharma and Rock Solid Technologies possess significant R&D operations on the island. Regarding entrepreneurship, several organizations have presence on the island as well, such as the Founder Institute, the Small Business Administration, SCORE, and Startup Weekend. Most entrepreneurial activities are driven by regional organizations that join academia, local government, and private businesses such as DISUR, INTECO, INTENE, and INTENOR. Other initiatives such as the Puerto Rico Technoeconomic Corridor, the Puerto Rico Science, Technology and Research Trust, and the Puerto Rico Small Business Technology and Development Center provide significant support to entrepreneurship and R&D on the island.

=== Quinary sector ===
Major management consulting firms have presence in the island including Accenture, the Boston Consulting Group, Booz Allen Hamilton, Deloitte, McKinsey & Company, and PricewaterhouseCoopers.

== Data ==
The following table shows the main economic indicators in 1980–2021 (with IMF staff estimtates in 2022–2027). Inflation below 5% is in green.

Year	GDP (in Bil. US$PPP)	GDP per capita (in US$ PPP)	GDP (in Bil. US$nominal)	GDP per capita (in US$ nominal)	GDP growth (real)	Inflation rate (in Percent)	Unemployment (in Percent)	Government debt (in % of GDP)
1980	22.2	6,926.1	14.4	4,507.2	▲n/a	n/a	17.1%	n/a
1981	▲24.5	▲7,599.8	▲16.0	▲4,940.8	▲1.1%	▲9.5%	▲19.8%	n/a
1982	▲25.3	▲7,756.6	▲16.8	▲5,146.9	▼-3.0%	▲3.2%	▲22.8%	n/a
1983	▲26.4	▲8,026.3	▲17.3	▲5,257.2	▲0.5%	▲0.3%	▲23.4%	n/a
1984	▲29.3	▲8,842.5	▲19.2	▲5,777.4	▲7.3%	▲1.7%	▼20.7%	n/a
1985	▲30.9	▲9,221.0	▲20.3	▲6,058.6	▲2.1%	▲0.2%	▲21.8%	n/a
1986	▲34.1	▲10,074.0	▲22.0	▲6,495.5	▲8.2%	▲-0.2%	▼18.9%	n/a
1987	▲36.6	▲10,719.7	▲23.9	▲6,987.4	▲4.9%	▲2.1%	▼16.8%	n/a
1988	▲40.4	▲11,694.6	▲26.2	▲7,579.3	▲6.5%	▲2.6%	▼15.0%	n/a
1989	▲44.1	▲12,613.9	▲28.3	▲8,094.3	▲4.9%	▲2.8%	▼14.6%	n/a
1990	▲47.4	▲13,444.4	▲30.6	▲8,675.6	▲3.8%	▲4.4%	▼14.2%	n/a
1991	▲50.2	▲14,127.4	▲32.3	▲9,093.5	▲2.3%	▲2.2%	▲16.0%	n/a
1992	▲53.6	▲15,006.5	▲34.6	▲9,687.4	▲4.6%	▲1.5%	▲16.7%	n/a
1993	▲57.5	▲15,961.9	▲36.9	▲10,255.5	▲4.6%	▲1.0%	▲17.0%	n/a
1994	▲61.2	▲16,859.8	▲39.7	▲10,942.9	▲4.2%	▲1.4%	▼14.6%	n/a
1995	▲65.3	▲17,857.8	▲42.6	▲11,667.6	▲4.5%	▲1.9%	▼13.7%	n/a
1996	▲68.0	▲18,456.3	▲45.3	▲12,305.0	▲2.3%	▲3.3%	▼13.4%	n/a
1997	▲72.6	▲19,526.6	▲48.2	▲12,968.4	▲4.9%	▲1.9%	▲13.5%	n/a
1998	▲78.2	▲20,851.5	▲54.1	▲14,430.2	▲6.5%	▲0.1%	▼13.3%	n/a
1999	▲82.8	▲21,879.9	▲57.8	▲15,293.2	▲4.4%	▲0.7%	▼11.7%	n/a
2000	▲87.4	▲22,935.2	▲61.7	▲16,192.1	▲3.3%	▲3.1%	▼10.1%	n/a
2001	▲97.8	▲25,617.3	▲69.7	▲18,243.7	▲9.5%	▲0.6%	▲11.4%	n/a
2002	▲101.5	▲26,547.0	▲72.5	▲18,972.8	▲2.2%	▲0.2%	▲12.3%	n/a
2003	▲105.9	▲27,687.4	▲75.8	▲19,820.2	▲2.3%	▲1.4%	▼12.0%	n/a
2004	▲110.9	▲28,989.6	▲80.3	▲20,989.0	▲2.0%	▲2.5%	▼10.6%	n/a
2005	▲112.1	▲29,346.9	▲83.9	▲21,959.3	▼-2.0%	▲5.6%	▲11.3%	n/a
2006	▲114.0	▲29,952.6	▲87.3	▲22,936.0	▼-1.4%	▲5.2%	▼10.5%	33.4%
2007	▲115.7	▲30,583.1	▲89.5	▲23,664.9	▼-1.2%	▲4.2%	▲11.2%	▲36.9%
2008	115.7	▲30,774.7	▲93.6	▲24,898.3	▼-1.8%	▲5.2%	▲11.8%	▲40.8%
2009	▼114.2	▼30,533.3	▲96.4	▲25,768.7	▼-2.0%	▲0.3%	▲15.3%	▲46.5%
2010	▲115.1	▲30,928.8	▲98.4	▲26,435.7	▼-0.4%	▲2.5%	▲16.4%	▲48.3%
2011	▲117.1	▲31,824.1	▲100.4	▲27,278.9	▼-0.4%	▲2.9%	▼15.9%	▲50.0%
2012	▲118.4	▲32,582.6	▲101.6	▲27,944.7	▲0.0%	▲1.3%	▼14.5%	▲53.7%
2013	▲119.2	▲33,172.7	▲102.5	▲28,513.2	▼-0.3%	▲1.1%	▼14.3%	▼52.3%
2014	▼119.1	▲33,682.7	▼102.4	▲28,981.3	▼-1.2%	▲0.6%	▼13.9%	▲54.5%
2015	▼118.1	▲34,006.7	▲103.4	▲29,755.4	▼-1.0%	▲-0.8%	▼12.0%	▼52.7%
2016	▼117.0	▲34,300.2	▲104.3	▲30,585.6	▼-1.3%	▲-0.3%	▼11.8%	▼49.9%
2017	▼114.3	▲34,627.2	▼103.4	▲31,347.3	▼-2.9%	▲1.8%	▼10.8%	▲51.2%
2018	▼112.1	▲35,044.5	▲104.9	▲32,789.1	▼-4.2%	▲1.3%	▼9.2%	▼50.4%
2019	▲115.8	▲36,201.4	104.9	▼32,785.9	▲1.5%	▲0.1%	▼8.3%	▼48.9%
2020	▼112.7	▼35,660.3	▼103.1	▼32,645.4	▼-3.9%	▲-0.5%	▲8.9%	▲50.2%
2021	▲120.5	▲38,608.2	▲108.5	▲34,751.9	▲2.7%	▲2.4%	▼7.9%	▼47.9%
2022	▲135.3	▲43,820.1	▲118.7	▲38,442.9	▲4.8%	▲4.4%	▼6.0%	▼16.0%
2023	▲140.7	▲46,023.1	▲123.4	▲40,360.2	▲0.4%	▲3.5%	▲7.9%	▼14.8%
2024	▲141.3	▲46,704.0	▲124.3	▲41,074.4	▼-1.6%	▲2.4%	▲8.8%	▼14.2%
2025	▲142.5	▲47,572.0	▲126.0	▲42,075.9	▼-1.0%	▲2.4%	▲8.9%	▼13.5%
2026	▲144.5	▲48,722.5	▲128.5	▲43,316.9	▼-0.5%	▲2.4%	▲9.0%	▼12.8%
2027	▲147.3	▲50,167.0	▲131.4	▲44,769.6	▲0.0%	▲2.3%	9.0%	▼12.0%

== Infrastructure ==
Puerto Rico has a modern infrastructure and an institutional framework guided by the regulations of U.S. federal agencies, most of which have an active and continued presence in the island. For most intents and purposes, Puerto Rico is treated as if it were a state of the United States, despite not being one. Virtually all federal laws apply on the island, save a few exceptions, including a strong and robust protection for intellectual property and contracts.

=== Education ===
Preschool education, care, and services (including Early Head Start and Head Start) are free for low income families with private daycares being common and within walking distance in urban areas. Primary and secondary education is compulsory and free regardless of income through more than 1,400 public schools. Only ten public schools are considered prestigious locally, all of them being magnet schools, which graduate the highest scores on the island of the College Board's PEAU (Latin America's equivalent of the SAT). Two examples of these are CIMATEC and CROEM which focus on science, technology, and mathematics. There are more than 700 private schools on the island, most of them Catholic. It is constitutionally illegal to deny entrance or take action against students that profess a difference faith than the school they attend or intend to attend. Students from differing denominations are legally freed from attending religious activities on the schools they attend. Prominent private schools include Academia del Perpetuo Socorro, Academia Maria Reina, Academia San Jorge, Colegio Marista Guaynabo, Colegio San Ignacio de Loyola, and Colegio San José which maintain a high rate of students being accepted into prominent universities in the United States.

There is a plethora of junior colleges on the island, the most prominent being the Huertas College, the ICPR Junior College, the Instituto de Banca y Comercio, and the National University College (NUC). There is only one state-run system, the Puerto Rico Technological Institute, which possesses several prestigious programs at the local level and whose costs are significantly below market prices. Thanks to this abundance of junior colleges—and the presence of other institutions of higher education— the percentage of Puerto Ricans with bachelor's degrees, at 18.3% according to the 2000 Census, is roughly comparable to the lower tier of American states.

Not a single college or university in Puerto Rico ranks in the top 700 global rankings, with only the state university, the University of Puerto Rico (UPR), appearing on the ranks. Several schools and programs appear on different rankings, but none of these is considered a prestigious ranking system, either nationally or internationally. The three major university systems on the island are: the University of Puerto Rico, with 11 campuses; the Ana G. Méndez University System (SUAGM) with three major, local campuses and five satellites located on the mainland; and the Interamerican University of Puerto Rico (Inter) with nine campuses and two specialized schools.

The University of Puerto Rico is considered one of the most elite secondary schools on the island, and within the Caribbean:

- it produces more than 80% of all post-secondary research on the island,
- it graduates the largest number of Hispanic engineers in the United States,
- it graduates the largest number of chemical engineers in the United States,
- it graduates the second largest number of female engineers in the United States,
- it possesses the largest number of patents by a university on the island,
- it possesses the largest enrollment on the island and one of the largest in the United States,
- it possesses the largest faculty body on the island and one of the largest in the United States,
- it possesses the largest number of academic programs on the island and one of the largest in the United States,
- it possesses the largest number of doctoral programs on the island,
- it possesses the largest number of campuses on the island,
- it possesses the highest ratio of students from the island that enroll in graduate studies,
- it confers the largest number of post-secondary degrees on the island,
- it conducts almost all medical research on the island,
- it is considered the best university in all the Caribbean,
- its flagship campus has won 24 out of the 97 global cups of the Puerto Rico college athletics, and
- it has graduated six out of ten governors of Puerto Rico.

The system, however, is highly politicized with its board of trustees, chancellor, rectors, deans, and program directors changing whenever a political party gains power (about every 4 or 8 years) as the university is a government-owned corporation. Its flagship campus is also prone to student strikes, averaging about one strike every three years that halts the whole campus, with the system as a whole averaging about one strike every five years that halts the whole system. Most strikes derive from the extremely cheap costs per credit the institution offers: US$55 per undergraduate credit and $117 per graduate credit. It is highly unlikely that a student graduates with college debt as a full Pell Grant covers most costs for low income students, and those that don't receive a full Pell Grant or a Pell Grant at all can easily cover tuition costs. However, this economic accessibility comes at a price for the residents of Puerto Rico: 9.6% of the General Budget of the Government of Puerto Rico is automatically assigned to the university by law. As the economy shrunk in recent years, so did the university's endowment, suffocating an already highly indebted university incapable of generating enough revenue to maintain itself. Because of this, the board of trustees increased tuition costs, which led to strikes. Other strikes were caused by the mere mention of lowering the aforementioned percentage automatically assigned to the university even though no bill has ever been filed for such purpose.

In terms of specialized schools and programs, not a single school and program in Puerto Rico is ranked in a prestigious system. The University of Puerto Rico possesses the largest academic offer with 472 academic programs of which 32 lead to a doctorate. UPR is also the only system with a business school, an engineering school, a law school, a nursing school, a school of architecture, and a school of medicine. Almost all its schools and programs rank first on the island, although competition has increased in the last decades with private universities gaining track at a fast pace. The Ana G. Méndez System, the Interamerican University, and the University of the Sacred Heart possess a business school with the University of Sacred Heart leading in non-profit management and social enterprise, as well as in communications. The Polytechnic University of Puerto Rico and the Turabo University both have engineering schools with the Polytechnic University leading in computer security and offering the only master's degree in computer science on the island. Ranking regarding law schools is subjective with the University of Puerto Rico School of Law, the Interamerican University of Puerto Rico School of Law, and the Eugenio María de Hostos School of Law considered the best although UPR still leads in constitutional law. In terms of medicine the University of Puerto Rico School of Medicine and the University of Puerto Rico School of Dental Medicine are simply unmatched, with the Interamerican University School of Optometry being the only school of optometry on the island. The Carlos Albizu University leads in psychology while the Metropolitan University leads in environmental management although UPR leads by far in environmental science. In terms of arts, the Atlantic University College leads in digital arts by far, while the Conservatory of Music of Puerto Rico and the Escuela de Artes Plásticas y Diseño de Puerto Rico are considered the most prestigious in music and arts respectively; both by far. The only school of international relations was created in November 2013 under the name of Morales Carrión Diplomatic and Foreign Relations School, ascribed to the Department of State of Puerto Rico and still in development. There are no veterinary schools on the island with most veterinarians studying abroad at the Universidad Autónoma de Santo Domingo in the Dominican Republic.

Almost all junior colleges, colleges, universities, and schools are accredited by the Middle States Association of Colleges and Schools. Specific programs tend to possess their respective accreditation as well (such as ABET, AACSB, LCME, and so on) although it is not uncommon for programs to not possess its expected accreditation—for example, only two business schools are accredited by AACSB.

=== Energy, water, and public utilities ===
PREPA's operating expenses for FY2013 denote how fuel purchases take over 58% of the authority's operating expenses.

Puerto Rico lacks coal, natural gas, and oil reserves, requiring it to import all its fuel for energy production. The Puerto Rico Electric Power Authority (PREPA), a government-owned corporation, produces 70% of all energy in Puerto Rico through several power plants dependent on fossil fuels. Fifty-eight percent of PREPA's budget is allocated to these costs. Additional indirect costs arise from power purchase agreements with private companies that generate 30% of the country's energy using fossil fuels. To meet energy demands, Puerto Rico must import oil at a rate of 8.0 billion kWh and about 1,499,196 km3 of natural gas per year as well as a very large amount of coal. Despite receiving an average of 65% sunny hours per day and consistent 19-knot (22 mph; 35 km/h) winds year-round, renewable sources generate less than 3% of Puerto Rico's energy.

Puerto Rico's geography, with its many rivers, could support hydroelectric power generation, but the industry has largely been abandoned. Public policy has also opted not to pursue nuclear power either. Biofuel, biomass, geothermal energy, wave power and tidal power are still in its infant stages although there are some microbusinesses providing energy from those sources or performing research on the subject. The Puerto Rican government has made plans to reduce dependency on costly imported fossil fuels, but lacks funds to make more than modest progress.

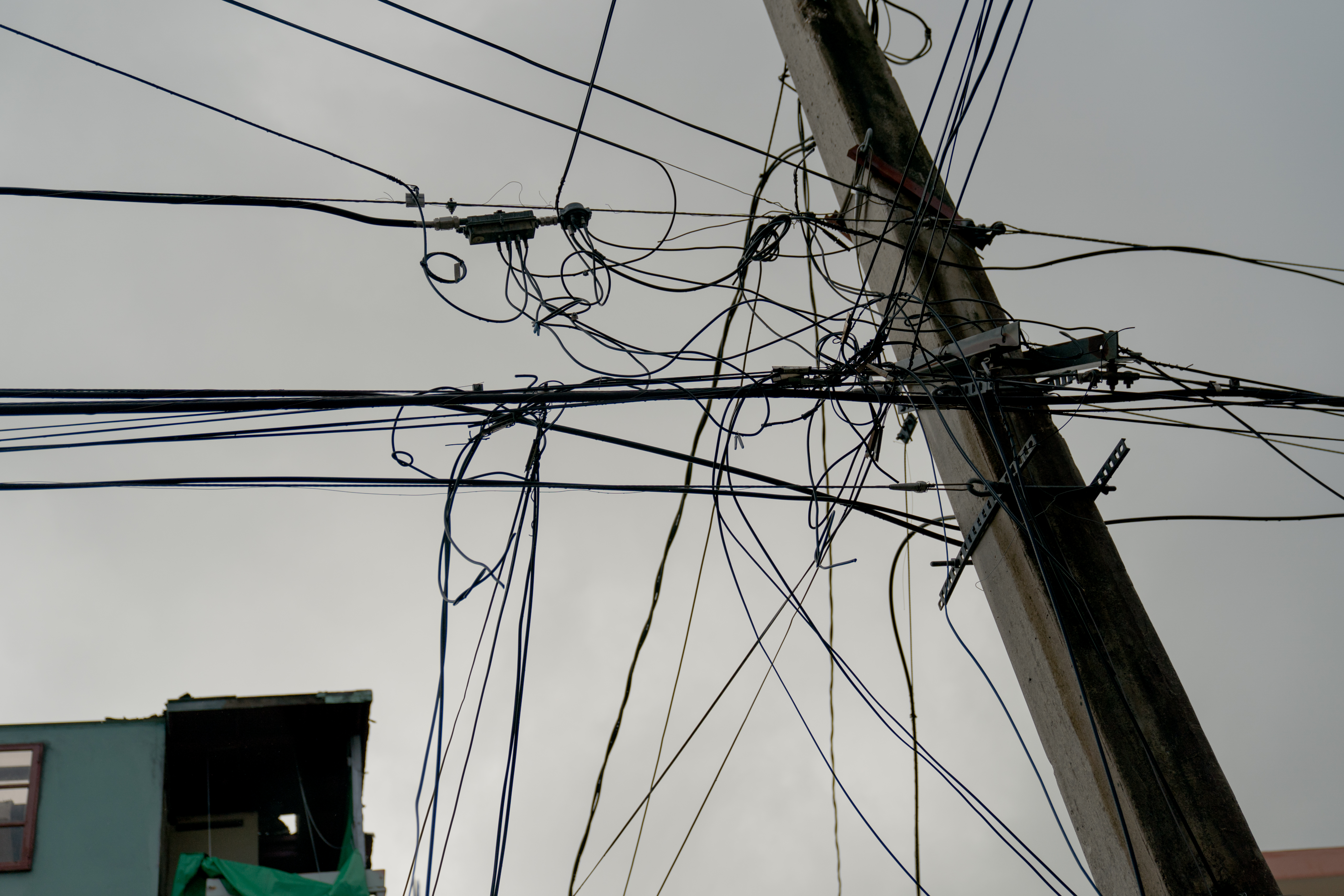
An example of a utility pole in Puerto Rico

As a result, Puerto Ricans pay 26¢ per kilowatt per hour of electricity, compared to an average of 11 to 12 cents or less across the United States. (Note: NotiCel (2013; in Spanish) "Actualmente, el costo por kilovatio hora en Puerto Rico es de 26 centavos, frente a EE.UU. que es de 11 a 12 centavos. ") This places Puerto Rico at an enormous disadvantage when compared to other states that produce electric power at less than half of Puerto Rico's price. Electric utility costs ultimately create a ripple effect on the economy as it adds to the cost of living and the cost of doing business. (Note: Kaske (2014) "High energy costs take money out of consumers' pockets and make it difficult for businesses to expand and invest", Ingrid Vila-Biaggi, chief of staff for Governor Alejandro Garcia Padilla, wrote in an e-mail. "Energy reform will enable us to stabilize Prepa's finances, reduce costs for consumers and businesses and become a model for energy policy in the region.") For example, 20% of Bacardi's expenses on the island come from electricity, while the company that owns all Wendy's, Applebee's, and LongHorn Steakhouse on the island has simply opted to keep the lights and air conditioning off in certain areas when employees arrive. (Note: Kaske (2014) "20 percent [of Bacardi's] expenses [come] from electricity".) (Note: Kaske (2014) "For Wendco of Puerto Rico Inc., which owns 100 franchise restaurants on the island, such as Wendy's, Applebee's and LongHorn Steakhouse, keeping the lights off is one strategy. When employees arrive in the morning to open the eateries, they keep some areas dark and without air conditioning until they're in use".)

The water industry is administered in whole by the Puerto Rico Aqueducts and Sewers Authority (PRASA), another government-owned corporation and government monopoly which owns and manages all the water supply network in Puerto Rico. All potable water comes either from raw water (primarily rainwater, lakes, and rivers) or sewage treatment subject to regulations by the Department of Natural and Environmental Resources of Puerto Rico (DRNA), the Environmental Protection Agency (EPA), the Puerto Rico Environmental Quality Board (JCA in Spanish), and the Safe Drinking Water Act. The water bottling industry is diverse with several plants on the island.

New Fortress Energy (NFE) has a contract with the Puerto Rican government until 2026 for the supply of liquefied natural gas to Puerto Rico.

=== Healthcare ===
In 2022, Puerto Rico experienced a higher death rate than in the aftermath of Hurricane Maria in 2017. This increase was attributed to several factors, including the COVID-19 pandemic, chronic health conditions, and ongoing challenges within the island's healthcare system. Years of economic hardship and natural disasters have led to a decline in healthcare resources, with many medical professionals and younger residents leaving the island. This has resulted in an older population with limited access to care. Systemic issues such as ambulance delays and hospital shortages contributed to preventable deaths. Overall, Puerto Rico's mortality rate in 2022 exceeded that of the mainland United States. The Washington Post reported on elevated death rates in Puerto Rico as a result of its "crumbling healthcare system".

The system meets the regulations of the U.S. Department of Health and Human Services which has jurisdiction over the island, and the local Department of Health of Puerto Rico. Medical offices within walking distance are common in urban areas as well as walk-in clinics, urgent care, emergency rooms, and hospitals. There are specialized hospitals for cardiovascular diseases, cancer treatment, children (pediatrics), psychiatric care, and veterans. Every medical specialty is covered in the island thanks to the different medical schools on the island, including the University of Puerto Rico School of Medicine, the Universidad Central del Caribe School of Medicine (UCCSoM), the Ponce School of Medicine, and the San Juan Bautista School of Medicine.

Veterinary healthcare is provided by private veterinarians, clinics, and animal hospitals which are common and scattered all over the island.

=== Postal service and shipping ===
The United States Postal Service has at least one postal office in each municipality in Puerto Rico with the island using zip codes as its postal code system. DHL, FedEx, and UPS have well established operations on the island.

Shipping cargo is expensive, as Puerto Rico is restricted to using the United States Merchant Marine when shipping from and to the United States, as per the Merchant Marine Act of 1920 (the Jones Act).

=== Security ===
Local security is overseen by the Puerto Rico Commission on Safety and Public Protection and the U.S. Department of Homeland Security. Law enforcement is carried out by the Puerto Rico Police, the local state police force which has many stations scattered throughout all municipalities. Municipal laws are enforced by each respective Puerto Rico municipal police. The legal system is a mix of the civil law and the common law systems. Disputes under local jurisdiction are carried out by a system of municipal courts, district courts, and appellate courts with the highest state court and the court of last resort being the Supreme Court of Puerto Rico.

Most U.S. federal laws apply in Puerto Rico as the island is a territory of the United States. Issues that trespass into federal jurisdiction are managed by the Federal Bureau of Investigation (FBI), the Drug Enforcement Administration (DEA), the Bureau of Alcohol, Tobacco, Firearms and Explosives (ATF), the United States Marshals Service (USMS), the U.S. Department of Justice (DOJ), and other federal agencies. Disputes that trespass the local jurisdiction are managed by the federal court system, with the United States District Court for the District of Puerto Rico being the first in line.

Fire protection, rescue, and protection from hazards is provided by the Puerto Rico Firefighters Corps which has at least one fire station in each municipality on the island. A separate agency, the Puerto Rico Medical Emergencies Corps, provides emergency medical services to all Puerto Rico. The island is also part of the 9-1-1 system. All local emergencies and disasters are managed and overseen by the Puerto Rico State Agency for Emergency and Disaster Management (AEMEAD) which works closely and directly with the Federal Emergency Management Agency (FEMA). Puerto Rico also has a local National Weather Service station which provides forecasts and public warnings, as well as a local Puerto Rico Seismic Network which tracks seismic activity and provides public warnings.

The local national guard is the Puerto Rico National Guard which has a branch for ground forces, the Puerto Rico Army National Guard, and another for aerial warfare, the Puerto Rico Air National Guard. The state defense force is the Puerto Rico State Guard under the sole jurisdiction of the governor. Both the Puerto Rico National Guard and the Puerto Rico State Guard are considered two of the most active and well-prepared local forces in the nation. Nine servicemen have been bestowed the Medal of Honor, the highest military decoration in the United States, with Puerto Ricans having served in every U.S. military conflict since World War I, including the War in Afghanistan and the Iraq War.

Key posts include the Puerto Rico Police Superintendent, the Puerto Rico Adjutant General, the Secretary of Justice of Puerto Rico, and the Chief Justice of the Supreme Court of Puerto Rico.

=== Telecommunications ===
Telecommunications meet the regulations of the Federal Communications Commission (FCC) which has jurisdiction over the island, and the local Puerto Rico Telecommunications Regulatory Board (JRT in Spanish). Broadcasts are transmitted through radio and television stations, as well as the Internet. Uno Radio Group and the Spanish Broadcasting System are two of the most prominent radio operators on the island. Telemundo, Univision, and WAPA America transmit television from the island through WKAQ-TV, WLII-TV, and WAPA-TV respectively.

Several communications service providers offer triple play (Internet + television + telephony) on the island with Claro Puerto Rico, and Liberty Media being the most prominent. Most downtime is caused by power failures in the electric grid rather than in telecommunications networks with outages being rare and fixed within hours. High speed internet access and mobile telephony is ubiquitous with providers such as Liberty, and T-Mobile being the most prominent. Chains like Burger King, Church's Chicken, McDonald's, and Starbucks provide free Wi-Fi at their numerous establishments.

Submarine communications cables landing in Puerto Rico include ARCOS-1, Americas II, and ANTILLAS I.

=== Transportation ===
Map of Puerto Rico's interstate highways

Cities and towns in Puerto Rico are interconnected by a system of roads, freeways, expressways, and highways maintained by the Puerto Rico Highways and Transportation Authority (PRHTA) under the jurisdiction of the U.S. Department of Transportation, and patrolled by the Puerto Rico Police. The island's metropolitan area is served by a public bus transit system and a rapid transit system. Other forms of public transportation include seaborne ferries (that serve Puerto Rico's archipelago) as well as share taxis.

The island has three international airports, the Luis Muñoz Marín International Airport (SJU) in Carolina, Mercedita Airport in Ponce, and the Rafael Hernández Airport in Aguadilla. Puerto Rico is also served by another 27 local airports. The Luis Muñoz Marín International Airport is the largest aerial transportation hub in the Caribbean, and one of the largest in the world in terms of passenger and cargo movement.

Puerto Rico has nine ports in different cities across the main island. The San Juan Port is the largest in Puerto Rico, the busiest port in the Caribbean and the 10th busiest in the United States in terms of commercial activity and cargo movement, respectively. The second largest port is the Port of the Americas in Ponce, currently under expansion to increase cargo capacity to 1.5 million twenty-foot containers (TEUs) per year.

== Comparative advantages ==
Puerto Rico does not have any comparative advantages in international markets but has a few at the U.S. national level. (Note: Bosworth (2011) "Puerto Rico doesn't have a comparative advantage, it's just taxes.") Its high costs of doing business are the primary factor, amongst many, that hinder the island from competing against foreign markets. These costs are typically offset by a combination of incentives or subsidies where the government either does not collect taxes against the foreign firm, assumes capital expenditures, subsidizes workers salaries and trainings, or, more often than not, offers a combination thereof. This is the case for Lufthansa's operations in Aguadilla where the local government invested US$46 million against $20 million invested by the company, aiming at recouping the investment in the long run. (Note: ICEX (2014; in Spanish) "En el caso de Lufthansa, el mayor costo para el gobierno es el de los incentivos ($46.4 millones)", puntualizó la economista.) (Note: ICEX (2014; in Spanish) "Uno de los aspectos que causa más confusión en el acuerdo con Lufthansa es la inversión que hará el gobierno en infraestructura, $44.2 millones, para la cual la Autoridad de los Puertos realizó una emisión de bonos de $41.3 millones.") (Note: ICEX (2014; in Spanish) "Adicional a la infraestructura, Lufthansa recibirá incentivos para empleos y adiestramiento, equivalentes a $3,000 y $6,000, respectivamente, por cada contratación. En total, este beneficio asciende a $2.2 millones.")

Domestically, however, several comparative advantages emerge when comparing Puerto Rico to other U.S. jurisdictions. These advantages base themselves on lower wages and beneficial legal loopholes that exist as a result of Puerto Rico's political status. For example, a company like Microsoft may create a subsidiary based in Puerto Rico in order to transfer its intellectual property to it, so that it can benefit from transfer pricing loopholes thereafter. Since the subsidiary is based in Puerto Rico, the company lawfully uses a loophole that allows it to undervalue the transferred intellectual property through the use of cost-sharing agreements, and by taking advantage of the revenue exceptions within the U.S. legal framework that apply exclusively to Puerto Rico.

This lack of advantages pervades the economy of the island extensively. As the territory is unable to compete against foreign markets, multinational corporations choose to close operations on the island and open them elsewhere. All while domestic businesses struggle to export their products and services when competing against external firms that offer lower prices. The same scenario occurs against other U.S. jurisdictions capable of producing goods and services at lesser costs.

== Public finance ==
=== Monetary policy ===
Puerto Rico does not have a local coin, using instead the United States dollar as its only currency. Because of this, Puerto Rico controls neither its money supply nor its interest rates, being subject instead to the monetary policy of the United States; particularly to the operations performed by the Federal Reserve System. Puerto Rico, however, has a representative in the Federal Reserve Bank of New York through a local businessman by the name of Richard Carrión, Chairman and CEO of Popular, Inc., who has served as member of the board for the reserve bank several times.

=== Public debt ===
The public debt of Puerto Rico has grown at a faster pace than the growth of its economy, reaching $46.7 billion in 2008. In January 2009, Governor Luis Fortuño enacted several measures aimed at eliminating the government's $3.3 billion deficit.

Since 2000, the government of Puerto Rico has experienced 26 consecutive negative cash flows which has contributed to the enlargement of its public debt, as the government incurs in new debt in order to pay the older one.

On 4 February 2014, Standard & Poor's downgraded the debt of Puerto Rico to junk status. Puerto Rico has roughly $70 billion outstanding debt for a population of four million inhabitants. Despite its small population it is the third issuer of municipal bonds in all 50 states and territories. First being California, second New York.

In early 2017, the Puerto Rican government-debt crisis posed serious problems for the government which was saddled with outstanding debt of $70 billion or $12,000 per capita at a time with a 45 percent poverty rate and 14.2% unemployment that is more than twice the mainland U.S. average.

The Commonwealth had been defaulting on many debts, including bonds, since 2015. Newly elected governor Ricardo Rosselló discussed the situation in an interview with the international Financial Times in mid January and indicated that he would seek an amicable resolution with creditors and also make fiscal reforms. "There will be real fiscal oversight and we are willing to sit down. We are taking steps to make bold reforms. ... What we are asking for is runway to establish these reforms and have Washington recognise that they have a role to play." He had instructed Puerto Rican government agencies to cut operating expenses by 10 percent and reduce political appointees by 20 percent. To ensure that funds would be available to pay for "essential" government services, Rosselló signed a fiscal emergency law on 28 January 2017, that would allow for setting aside funds that might otherwise be required for debt payments.

In mid January, the cash strapped government was having difficulty maintaining health care funding. "Without action before April, Puerto Rico's ability to execute contracts for Fiscal Year 2018 with its managed care organizations will be threatened, thereby putting at risk beginning July 1, 2017 the health care of up to 900,000 poor U.S. citizens living in Puerto Rico", according to a letter sent to Congress by the Secretary of the Treasury and the Secretary of Health and Human Services. They also said that "Congress must enact measures recommended by both Republicans and Democrats that fix Puerto Rico's inequitable health care financing structure and promote sustained economic growth." In late January, the federal control board created under PROMESA gave the government until 28 February to present a fiscal plan (including negotiations with creditors) to solve the problems. It is essential for Puerto Rico to reach restructuring deals to avoid a bankruptcy-like process under PROMESA. A moratorium on lawsuits by debtors was extended to 31 May.

Governor Rosselló hired investment expert Rothschild & Co in January 2017 to assist in convincing creditors to take deeper losses than they had expected on Puerto Rico's debts. The company was also exploring the possibility of convincing insurers that had guaranteed some of the bonds against default, to contribute more to the restructuring, according to reliable sources. The governor also planned to negotiate restructuring of about $9 billion of electric utility debt, a plan that could result "in a showdown with insurers". Political observers suggest that his negotiation of the electrical utility debt indicated Rosselló's intention to take a harder line with creditors. Puerto Rico has received authority from the federal government to reduce its debt with legal action and this may make creditors more willing to negotiate instead of becoming embroiled in a long and costly legal battle.

=== Taxation ===
Taxation is highly complex due to a lack of uniformity in the local internal revenue code and a disparate amount of incentives, subsidies, tax exemptions, tax breaks, and tax deductions. For example, an ordinary retail sale might have to pay: import taxes, sales taxes, property taxes, corporate net income taxes, national taxes, excise taxes, and sin taxes depending on the item being sold. Regardless of all this, American citizens that reside in Puerto Rico do not pay federal income taxes unless they work for the federal government, do business with the federal government, or send funds to the mainland United States. This peculiarity has been taken as an advantage by the local government which now offers a plethora of tax exemptions and tax benefits for high-net-worth individuals that relocate to the island. These benefits have been ratified into law through Act 20 of 2012, Act 22 of 2012, and Act 273 of 2012. Thanks to these acts, business owners residing on the island might be completely exempt from paying any local and federal taxes at all, depending on their line of business.

On 15 November 2006, the government implemented a 5.5% sales tax.

In June 2025, the Puerto Rican Senate approved House Bill 505, which imposes a 4% tax on new individual beneficiaries under Law 60-2019, known as the Puerto Rican Incentives Code. The bill is part of a broader review of the tax incentive system, amid a public debate on the law's real benefits for the local economy.

== Comparatives ==
=== Business sizes ===
More than 99% of all businesses in Puerto Rico are considered small businesses (less than 250 employees) with more than 75% being micro-enterprises (less than 10 employees). However, in terms of payroll, small businesses constitute about 63% of all payroll on the island with about 14% of all payroll coming from medium businesses (between 250–499 employees) and about 23% coming from large enterprises (more than 500 employees).

Business sizes and payroll in Puerto Rico
Number of employees	Number of businesses	Annual payroll (in thousands)
1–5	24,559	$ / 1,270,973
5–9	8,065	$ / 1,237,288
10–19	5,086	$ / 1,564,863
20–49	3,504	$ / 2,596,935
50–99	1,099	$ / 2,023,165
100–249	652	$ / 2,599,972
250–499	219	$ / 2,485,160
500–999	104	$ / 2,105,349
1,000+	41	$ / 2,062,669
Total	43,329	$ / 17,946,374

Only 7.5% of the corporations registered in the Department of State of Puerto Rico—or about 6,000 out of 80,000—exceed $3M in revenue. Of these 6,000, a mere six compose more than 30% of all of Puerto Rico's corporate income tax collections; all six being multinationals.

=== Cost of living ===
The cost of living in Puerto Rico, specifically San Juan, is quite high compared to most major cities in the United States. (Note: MRGI (2008) "Many female migrants leave their families behind due to the risk of illegal travel and the high cost of living in Puerto Rico.") One factor is housing prices which are comparable to Miami and Los Angeles, although property taxes are considerably lower than most places in the United States. (Note: Rivera. "Housing prices in Puerto Rico are comparable to Miami or Los Angeles, but property taxes are considerably lower than most places in the US.") Statistics used for cost of living sometimes do not take into account certain costs, such as increased travel costs for longer flights, additional shipping fees, and the loss of promotional participation opportunities for customers "outside the continental United States". While some online stores do offer free shipping on orders to Puerto Rico, many merchants exclude Hawaii, Alaska, Puerto Rico and other United States territories.

The median home value in Puerto Rico ranges from US$100,000 to $214,000, while the national median home value sits at $119,600. (Note: FRBNY (2011) "home values vary considerably across municipios: for the metro area overall, the median value of owner-occupied homes was estimated at $126,000 (based on data for 2007-09), but these medians ranged from $214,000 in Guaynabo to around $100,000 in some of the outlying municipios. The median value in the San Juan municipio was estimated at $170,000.")

=== Ease of doing business ===
Puerto Rico is considered the 40th economy out of 189 in rank of ease of doing business by the World Bank; surpassed only by Chile in Latin America. It ranks very poorly in construction permits but very well in getting credit and protecting investors.

=== Income ===
Puerto Ricans had median household income of $18,314 for 2009, which makes Puerto Rico's economy comparable to the independent nations of Latvia or Poland. By comparison, the poorest state of the Union, Mississippi, had median household income of $36,646 in 2009. Nevertheless, Puerto Rico's GDP per capita compares favorably to other independent Caribbean nations, and is one of the highest in North America. See List of North American countries by GDP per capita

Puerto Rico has a GDP per capita of $16,300 (2010 est.). Compared to the rest of the world they are ranked 73rd. Puerto Rico's GDP per capita has been declining in recent years ($18,100 (2008 est.), and $17,400 (2009 est.)). According to statistics from the Central Intelligence Agency (CIA), its GDP per capita is the 10th highest in the Caribbean, behind the Bahamas ($30,400), Aruba ($25,300) Barbados ($25,000), Trinidad and Tobago ($20,000), Antigua & Barbuda ($17,800) and British dependencies Cayman Islands ($43,800), British Virgin Islands ($42,300) and Turks & Caicos ($29,100).

In terms of personal income, federal transfer payments to Puerto Rico make up more than 20% of the island's personal income. By comparison, the poorest state, Mississippi, had a median level of $21,587, according to the U.S. Census Bureau's Current Population Survey, 2002 to 2004 Annual Social and Economic Supplements. Since 1952, the gap between Puerto Rico's per capita income and the national level has changed substantially – from one third the U.S. national average and roughly half that of the poorest state in 1952, to 10% less than the poorest state in 2007.

In 2010 the median income in Puerto Rico was $19,370, which is just over half that of the poorest state (Mississippi, $37,838) and 37% of the nationwide average ($51,144). According to the Bureau of Labor Statistics of the Department of Labor of the United States, the mean annual salary of residents of Puerto Rico is $27,190, the lowest among U.S. territories continuously surveyed periodically by the institution. Guam has the second lowest mean salary to $31,840, closely followed Mississippi, a state, with $34,770. This spread in mean wages could be explained by a minimum wage law for certain industries that are capped to 70% of the federal minimum wage of $7.25 per hour.

In 2017, the median income in Puerto Rico was $25,332.

=== Workforce ===
Puerto Rico's most competitive advantage lies on its labor force: a highly competitive, educated, and skilled labor force that enjoys American citizenship. This allows U.S.-based companies to relocate some of its operations to the island for cheaper labor costs while still maintaining a labor force subject to the rights and benefits given by American citizenship and federal regulations. Educated workers tend to be bilingual as well while costing 30–35% less than a worker in the mainland.

Workforce of Puerto Rico by sector
Sector	Number of persons (in thousands)	Percentage
Professionals, Executives, and Managerial	344	31%
Technical, Salespeople and Administrative Support	279	25%
Service Workers	186	17%
Operatives and Related	112	10%
Craftsmen, Foremen, and Related	72	7%
Farm Workers	38	3%
General Laborers Workers	78	7%
Total	1,111	100.0%

== Challenges ==
=== Costs of doing business ===
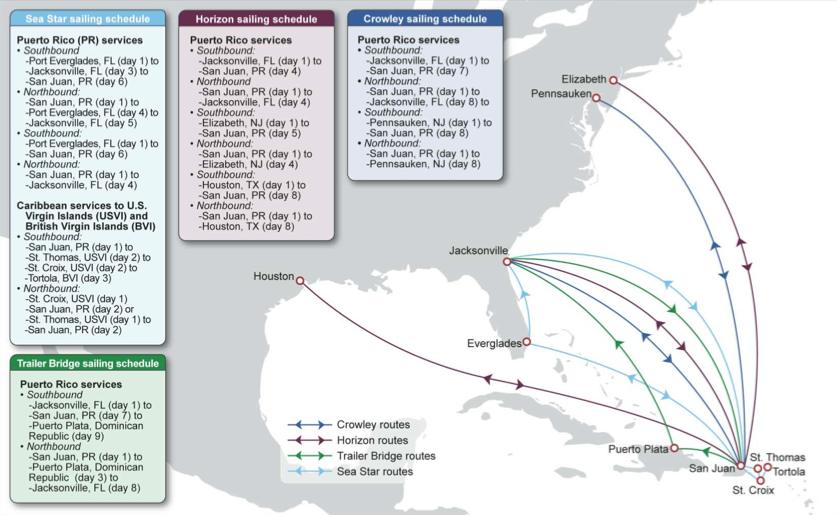
Map of Jones Act carrier routes for Puerto Rico.

One of the most significant contributors to the high cost of living in Puerto Rico is the Merchant Marine Act of 1920 (also known as the Jones Act) which prevents foreign-flagged ships from carrying cargo between two American ports (a practice known as cabotage). (Note: Gutierrez. "Mr. Chairman, we are here to express our support for any effort that would unburden the economy of the Commonwealth of Puerto Rico from the unfair and unreasonable restrictions that stem from dispositions of the Merchant Marine Acts of 1920 and 1936 on trade conducted between the Commonwealth and the United States mainland.") (Note: Gutierrez. "Being treated as an extension of the United States coastline by the protectionist merchant marine statutes has imposed a heavy and unfair cost on United States citizens in Puerto Rico.") (Note: Gutierrez. "The Merchant Marine Acts inflict costs to the Puerto Rican economy.") (Note: JOC (2013) "Repealing or amending the Jones Act cabotage law might cut Puerto Rico shipping costs") (Note: JOC (2013) "The GAO report said its interviews with shippers indicated they ... believed that opening the trade to non-U.S.-flag competition could lower costs.") Because of the Jones Act, foreign ships inbound with goods from Central and South America, Western Europe, and Africa cannot stop in Puerto Rico, offload Puerto Rico-bound goods, load mainland-bound Puerto Rico-manufactured goods, and continue to U.S. ports. Instead, they must proceed directly to U.S. ports, where distributors break bulk and send Puerto Rico-bound manufactured goods to Puerto Rico across the ocean by U.S.-flagged ships. (Note: Gutierrez. "The "cabotage" laws impose significant restrictions on commerce between Puerto Rico and the U. S. mainland by requiring that merchandise and produce shipped by water between U.S. ports be shipped only on U.S.-built, U.S.- manned, U.S.-flagged, and U.S.-citizen owned vessels.")

Puerto Rican consumers ultimately bear the expense of transporting goods again across the Atlantic and Caribbean Sea on U.S.-flagged ships subject to the extremely high operating costs imposed by the Jones Act. (Note: Gutierrez. "Because such restrictions boost shipping costs, American consumers pay the price.") This also makes Puerto Rico less competitive with Caribbean ports as a shopping destination for tourists from home countries with much higher taxes (like mainland states) even though prices for non-American manufactured goods in theory should be cheaper since Puerto Rico is much closer to Central and South America, Western Europe, and Africa.

The local government of Puerto Rico has requested several times to the U.S. Congress to exclude Puerto Rico from the Jones Act restrictions without success. (Note: Santiago (2021) "Local detractors of the Jones Act ... for many years have unsuccessfully tried to have Puerto Rico excluded from the law's provisions".) The most recent measure has been taken by the 17th Legislative Assembly of Puerto Rico through R. Conc. del S. 21. These measures have always received support from all the major local political parties. In 2013 the Government Accountability Office published a report which concluded that "repealing or amending the Jones Act cabotage law might cut Puerto Rico shipping costs" and that "shippers believed that opening the trade to non-U.S.-flag competition could lower costs." The report, however, concluded that the effects of modifying the application of the Jones Act for Puerto Rico are highly uncertain for both Puerto Rico and the United States, particularly for the U.S. shipping industry and the military preparedness of the United States.

The costs of doing business in Puerto Rico are further increased by complex labor laws that force employers to pay for several employee benefits from their own pockets. Puerto Rico also lacks at-will employment which puts significant restraints on employers when they want to dismiss an employee.

Residents of Puerto Rico are also subject to a highly complex tax system with many different exemptions and disparities between taxes. (Note: Alvarado León (2014; in Spanish) "Nuestras estructuras de consumo e ingresos son demasiado complejas, particularmente por la existencia de una plétora de provisiones (créditos, deducciones, exenciones, etc.) que no están sujetas a un análisis de costo-beneficio.")

In February 2025, Governor Jennifer Gonzalez-Colón announced a request by the government of Puerto Rico for a permanent exemption from air cabotage laws in Puerto Rico. Puerto Rico's exemption from U.S. air cabotage laws permits its use as a transshipment hub for international cargo and passengers. This exemption was extended until January 2027.

=== Made in Puerto Rico ===
In May 2025, the Puerto Rico Senate recognized the Hecho en Puerto Rico Association (HEPR) for promoting economic development and local entrepreneurship in Puerto Rico.

=== Inefficient government ===
The political class has proven to be highly stubborn when examining existent public policies. (Note: Sotomayor (2015) "If Puerto Rico's ills were to be summarized concisely, the island is paying the price of applying rich-country policies on what is (to this day) an essentially poor society.") (Note: Clark (2015) "Puerto Rico's bond default on Monday – along with statements that preceded it – cast doubt on the ability of its leaders to fully understand and manage the island's unfolding financial crisis.") This stubbornness ultimately forced Puerto Rico to incur in higher opportunity costs. For example, even though the island's geography features many rivers, the government has opted to leave the hydroelectric industry behind. Public policy has also opted not to pursue nuclear power either. Instead, even though Puerto Rico does not have any oil-based resources, it has opted to power its electric plants with fossil fuels: less than 3% of all energy is produced through renewable energy even though Puerto Rico enjoys more than 65% sunny hours per day in average and 19-knot (22 mph; 35 km/h) winds year round. This forces PREPA, the government-owned corporation and government monopoly that owns and manages all electric power distribution and transmission, to spend 58% of its operational expenses in fuel purchases alone.

Puerto Rico imports approximately 85% of its food, despite having a climate suitable for agriculture.

Similarly, when looking at forestry, even though a study conducted more than two decades ago by the U.S. Forest Service concluded that local soil could sustain a lumber industry if the proper species were used, almost all wood used on the island is imported.

Higher education suffers the same fate: Puerto Rico spends almost $800M per year on its state university even though none of its programs and schools appear in any prestigious ranking whatsoever. In addition, the system graduates about 50,000 students per year even though the labor market generates only about 6,000 jobs per year of which 25% of them require a college education. (Note: Calderón (2013; in Spanish) "En 2012, se graduaron cerca de 50,000 estudiantes de nivel subgraduado y graduado y se proyectaba que el mercado laboral generara en promedio cerca de 6,000* empleos por año, de los cuales sólo el 25% requiere esos niveles de educación.") This effectively means that the Puerto Rican labor market has no demand for 97% of those who graduate with an undergraduate or graduate degree in Puerto Rico.

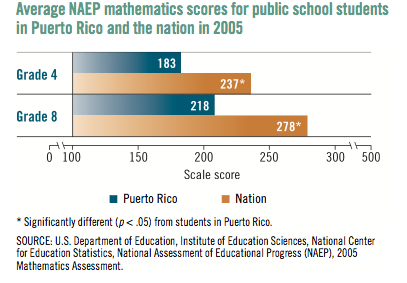
NAEP scores 2005

The same occurs in primary education and secondary education: Puerto Rico spends almost $4 billion per year in its public education system even though 40% of all the students that enter tenth grade in public schools in Puerto Rico drop out and never finish secondary education. In addition, ninety-five percent (95%) of public school students in Puerto Rico graduate at a sub-basic level while sixty percent (60%) do not even graduate. Furthermore, according to the Department of Education of Puerto Rico, thirty-nine percent (39%) of public school students perform at a basic level (average performance) in Spanish in the Puerto Rican Tests of Academic Achievement. Likewise, 36% perform at a basic level in Mathematics while 35% perform at a basic level in English and 43% at a basic level in Science in the relevant tests. Overall, 1,321 out of 1,466 public schools in Puerto Rico (about 90%) do not comply with the academic progress requirements established by the No Child Left Behind Act.

The local government has also proven to be highly inefficient in terms of management and planning; with some newspapers, such as El Vocero, stating that the main problem is inefficiency rather than lack of funds. (Note: Vera Rosa (2013; in Spanish) "Aunque Puerto Rico mueve entre el sector público y privado $15 billones en el área de salud, las deficiencias en el sistema todavía no alcanzan un nivel de eficiencia óptimo.") (Note: Vera Rosado (2013; in Spanish) "Para mejorar la calidad de servicio, que se impacta principalmente por deficiencias administrativas y no por falta de dinero".) As an example, the Department of Treasury of Puerto Rico is incapable of collecting 44% of the Puerto Rico Sales and Use Tax (or about US$900 million), did not match what taxpayers reported to the department with the income reported by the taxpayer's employer through Form W-2's, and did not collect payments owned to the department by taxpayers that submitted tax returns without their corresponding payments. (Note: Rivera Sánchez (2014; in Spanish) "En 2012 ... la tasa de captación en el segmento de ventas al detal fue de 52% con una tasa de evasión de 48%. En el resto de los renglones, la captación fue de 56% con una evasión de 44%.") The Treasury department also tends to publish its comprehensive annual financial report (CAFR) late, sometimes 15 months after a fiscal year ends, while the government as a whole constantly fails to comply with its continuing disclosure obligations on a timely basis. (Note: GDB (2014) "On several occasions the Commonwealth has failed to comply with its continuing disclosure obligations on a timely basis. For example, the Commonwealth has failed to file the Commonwealth's Annual Financial Report before the 305-day deadline in nine of the past twelve years, including the two most recent fiscal years (2012 and 2013).") Furthermore, the government's accounting, payroll and fiscal oversight information systems and processes also have deficiencies that significantly affect its ability to forecast expenditures. (Note: GDB (2014) "[The government's] accounting, payroll and fiscal oversight information systems and processes have deficiencies that significantly affect its ability to forecast expenditures.")

Similarly, salaries for government employees tend to be quite disparate when compared to the private sector and other positions within the government itself. For example, a public teacher's base salary starts at $24,000 while a legislative advisor starts at $74,000. The government has also been unable to set up a system based on meritocracy, with many employees, particularly executives and administrators, simply lacking the competencies required to perform their jobs. (Note: Acevedo Denis (2013; in Spanish) "Para el profesor de la Escuela Graduada de Administración Pública de la Universidad de Puerto Rico, Rafael Torrech San Inocencio, más que una cuestión de que funcionarios del Gobierno devenguen altos salarios, es si tienen o no las competencias para los cargos que ocupan.") (Note: Acevedo Denis (2013; in Spanish) "Hay funcionarios bien pagados, funcionarios excesivamente pagados y funcionarios que merecen mejor paga. El problema es cómo se parean las remuneraciones con las competencias profesionales.")

There was a similar situation at the municipal level with 36 out of 78 municipalities experiencing a budget deficit, putting 46% of the municipalities in financial stress. Just like the central government, the municipalities would issue debt through the Puerto Rico Municipal Financing Agency to stabilize its finances rather than make adjustments. In total, the combined debt carried by the municipalities of Puerto Rico account for US$3.8 billion or about 5.5% of Puerto Rico's outstanding debt. (Note: WAPA-TV (2014; in Spanish) "El informe sobre la medida señala que al presente los municipios arrastran una deuda agregada de aproximadamente $590 millones".) (Note: PRGDB "Financial Information and Operating Data Report to October 18, 2013" p. 61)

=== Population decline ===
From 2000 to 2010, the population of Puerto Rico decreased, the first such decrease in census history for Puerto Rico; it went from 3,808,610 residents registered in 2000 to 3,725,789 in 2010 (a −2.2% decrease); it peaked at 3.91 million in 2005. A declining and aging population presents additional problems for any society as its labor force decreases and, consequently, so does its economic output. (Note: GDB (2014) "Changes in population have had, and may continue to have, an impact on economic growth and on the growth of tax revenues.") Two years later, another estimate noted that the population of Puerto Rico decreased further to 3,667,084 residents from 1 April 2010, to 1 July 2012; a −1.6% decrease.

Emigration is also major part of Puerto Rico's declining population. Starting soon after World War II, poverty, cheap airfare, and promotion by the local government caused waves of Puerto Ricans to move to the mainland United States. This trend continued even as Puerto Rico's economy improved and its birth rate declined. In recent years, the population has declined markedly, falling nearly 1% in 2012 and an additional 1% (36,000 people) in 2013 due to a falling birthrate and emigration.

The US Census Bureau's estimate for 1 July 2016, was 3,411,307 people, down substantially from the 2010 data which had indicated 3,725,789 people. As fewer people reside in Puerto Rico, the government collects less revenue from its residents. As revenues were declining in the past, the government opted to issue more outstanding debt (such as bonds) to maintain its operations rather than making adjustments. Hence, the declining - and aging - population continues to present problems for the commonwealth.

=== Suzerainty to the United States ===
Puerto Rico is subject to the Commerce and Territorial Clause of the Constitution of the United States and, therefore, is restricted on how it can engage with other nations, sharing most of the opportunities and limitations that state governments have, albeit not being one. Puerto Rico is also subject to the different treaties and trade agreements ratified by the United States, as well as all other laws enacted at the federal level.

=== Unemployment ===
Unemployment is a significant issue in Puerto Rico with the unemployment rate being as high as 11.7% in 2006. By November 2009, it stood at 12% and had increased to 15.7% by October 2010. Currently the unemployment rate is at 13.7% The U.S. state with the highest unemployment in October 2007 was Michigan, at 7.7%, and the U.S. average was 4.4%.

In mid January 2017, unemployment remained in the double digits and the poverty rate was at 45 percent. By that time, the Commonwealth's debt had increased to $70 billion or $12,000 per capita. The debt had been increasing during a decade long recession. It is essential for Puerto Rico to reach restructuring deals to avoid a bankruptcy-like process under PROMESA.

Puerto Rico's labor force from 2005 to 2014 evidences a decline.

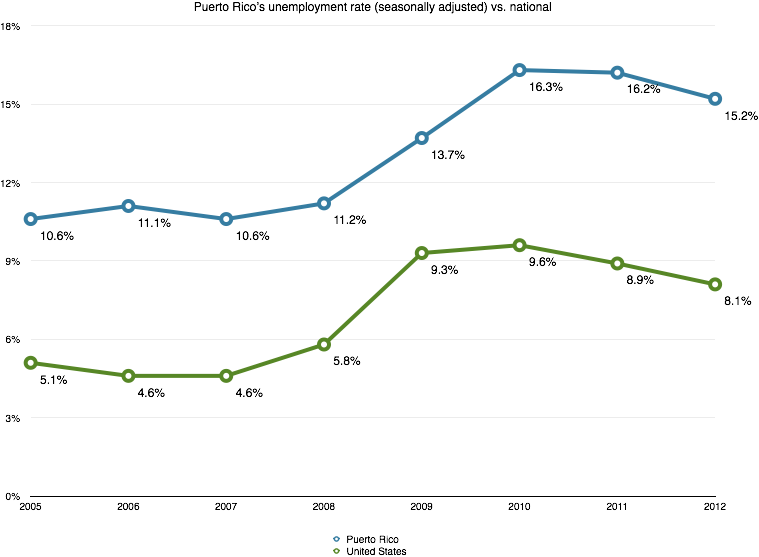
Puerto Rico's unemployment rate (seasonally adjusted) is significantly higher than the U.S. national average.

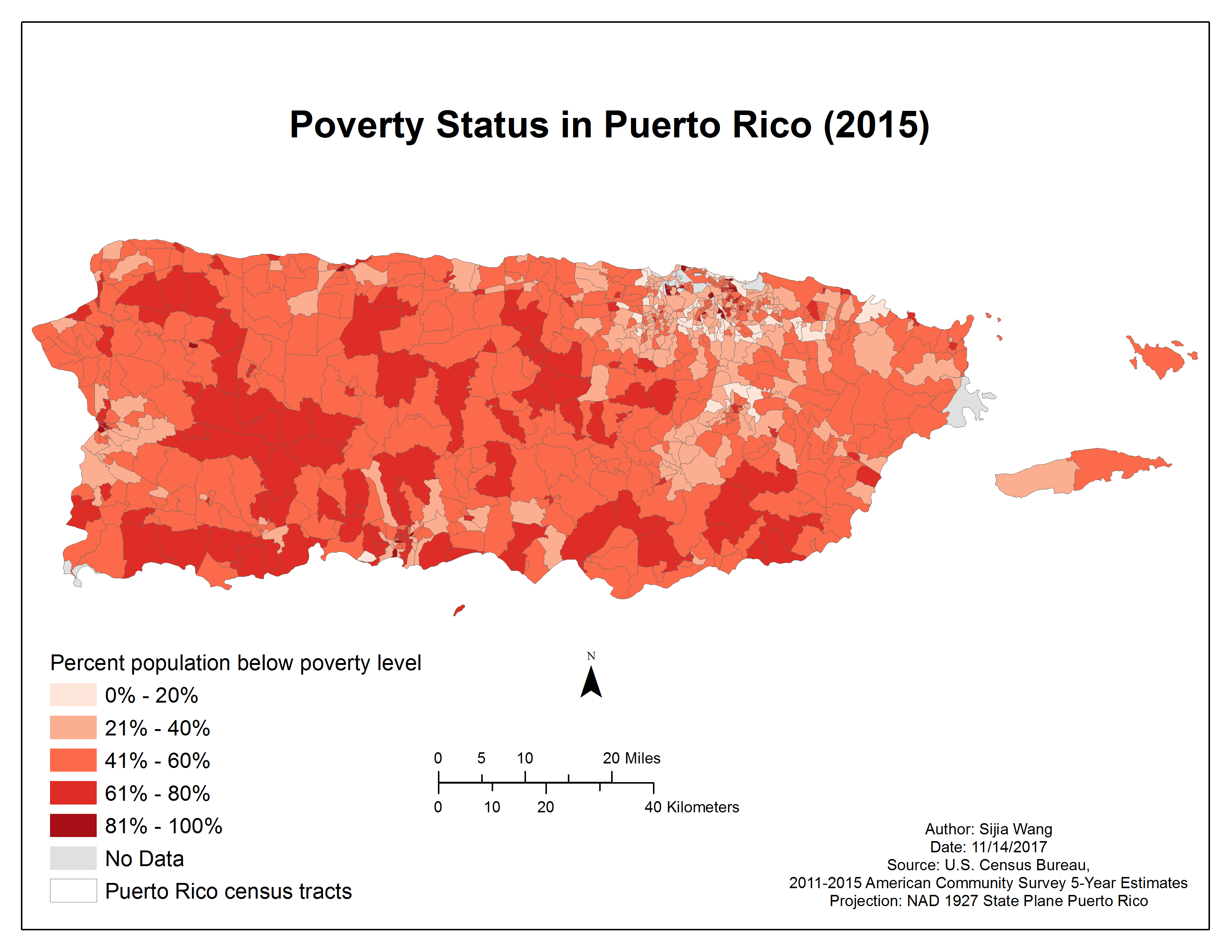
Percent population living below poverty level in Puerto Rico by census tract in 2015.

== Facts & figures ==
- Debt - External: $70 billion (23 January 2017, 2010 est.)
- GDP
  - Purchasing power parity: $64.84 billion (2010 est.)
  - Official exchange rate: $93.52 billion (2010 est.)
  - Real growth rate: -5.8% (2010 est.)
  - Per capita: $16,300 (2010 est.)
- Inflation rate (consumer prices): 2.9% (2011 est.)
- Industrial production growth rate: NA%
- Median household income (2016 est.):
  - $19,350
- Persons living in poverty (2016 est.):
  - 46.1%
- Budget:
  - revenues: $8.1 billion Central Government, $25 billion with public corporations
  - expenditures: $9.6 billion Central Government
- Electricity
  - production: 23,720 GWh
  - consumption: 22,600 GWh
  - exports: 0 kWh
  - imports: 0 kWh (2007 est.)
- Electricity – production by source (2020):
  - Petroleum 49.5%
  - Natural gas: 29%
  - Coal: 19%
  - Renewable: 2.5%
- Agriculture – products: sugarcane, coffee, pineapples, plantains, bananas; livestock products, chickens
- Exports – commodities: chemicals, electronics, apparel, canned tuna, rum, beverage concentrates, medical equipment
- Exports: $64.88 billion (2011 est.)
- Imports – commodities: chemicals, machinery and equipment, clothing, food, fish, petroleum products
- Imports: $44.67 billion (2011 est.)
- Sales Tax: 11.5%
  - 7% (only for prepared food)
- Labor Force: 1.286 million (March 2012)

== See also ==
- Economy of the United States
- List of companies of Puerto Rico
- Public debt of Puerto Rico
- Welfare in Puerto Rico
