= Modern Colonization by Medical Intervention =

2013 non-fiction book

Modern Colonization by Medical Intervention: U.S. Medicine in Puerto Rico
- First edition
- Author: Nicole Trujillo-Pagán
- Language: English
- Subject: Medical colonization of Puerto Rico
- Publisher: Brill
- Publication date: 2013
- ISBN: 978-90-04-24371-2

Modern Colonization by Medical Intervention: U.S. Medicine in Puerto Rico is a 2013 nonfiction book by Nicole Trujillo-Pagán. The book details how the United States and its physicians used the medical treatment of Puerto Ricans, particularly jíbaros, to colonize and occupy Puerto Rico.

== Academic journal reviews ==
- De Barros, J. (2016). Review of Modern Colonization by Medical Intervention: U.S. Medicine in Puerto Rico, by N. Trujillo-Pagán. Journal of the History of Medicine and Allied Sciences, 71(1), 101–103.
- Espinosa, M., & Trujillo-Pagán, N. (2015). Review of Modern Colonization by Medical Intervention: U.S. Medicine in Puerto Rico. Studies in Critical Social Sciences vol. 58. Bulletin of the History of Medicine, 89(2), 356–357.
- Hoefte, R. (2015). Review of Modern Colonization by Medical Intervention: U.S. Medicine in Puerto Rico, by N. Trujillo-Pagán. NWIG: New West Indian Guide / Nieuwe West-Indische Gids, 89(3/4), 372–373.

== See also ==
- Colonization of Puerto Rico by the United States
- Healthcare in Puerto Rico
- Public health in Puerto Rico
