= 2006 Puerto Rico budget crisis =

Crisis in Puerto Rico

The 2006 Puerto Rico budget crisis was a political, economic, and social crisis that saw much of the government of Puerto Rico shut down after it ran out of funds near the end of the 2005–2006 fiscal year. The shut down lasted for two weeks from 1 May 2006 through 14 May 2006, leaving nearly 100,000 public employees without pay and closing more than 1,500 public schools.

The crisis was publicly criticized by the business sector, non-profit organizations, Puerto Rican celebrities, and through public demonstration. It was described as the consequence of a political power struggle between the Commonwealth's main opposing political parties: the Popular Democratic Party and the New Progressive Party.

== Crisis ==
In April 2006, Governor Anibal Acevedo Vilá (PPD) announced that the central government of Puerto Rico did not have enough cash flows to pay projected operating expenses for the months of May and June, including the salaries of thousands of public employees. The governor asked the Legislative Assembly of Puerto Rico to approve an emergency loan of over US$500 million so that the government would use to continue to run, which then the government would repay using 1% of a newly proposed sales tax, or else the Governor would order a partial shutdown of central government operations, including the closing of numerous agencies.

The Puerto Rico Government Development Bank offered to supply the loan, but insisted on a tax reform plan that requires this new tax to be collected with a predetermined rate or amount be set aside exclusively for the loan repayment. The NPP-majority Senate approved the loan based on the proposed tax rate, but the NPP-majority House of Representatives refused to do so.

In a televised address on 27 April, Governor Acevedo Vilá announced that most of the government agencies would be shut down beginning 1 May, and would remain closed unless the House approved the economic plan. Government activities relating to health and security (including hospitals and police stations) would remain open, although medical professionals questioned whether hospitals would function if staff went unpaid and also raised the issue of government-funded prescriptions, whilst private security firms on contract to the government said they might cease work if the government did not pay what it owes them.

Senate President Kenneth McClintock said that the shutdown was unnecessary since the government had enough funds to continue paying public workers until the first week of June and that under no circumstance should public schools be shut down. NPP President Pedro Rosselló said he did not think Governor Acevedo Vilá would shut down the government and accused him of trying to create "uneasiness" and "intimidate the Legislature".

A public demonstration against the shutdown, named the Puerto Rico Shouts march, attracted thousands of people on 28 April. Later on, labor leaders called for a general strike if the shutdown occurred.

In a referendum held on 10 July 2005, Puerto Rican voters overwhelmingly approved the change to a unicameral legislature by 456,267 votes in favor versus 88,720 against, although three-quarters of voters chose to abstain. This change would become effective in January 2009 if an additional referendum were held to specifically amend the Puerto Rican Constitution and tailor it to the new legislative body, which is highly unlikely since the House defeated a Senate-passed proposed constitutional amendment.

== Government shutdown ==
On 1 May 2006, with the House of Representatives, the Senate, and the Governor having failed to reach an agreement, 45 government agencies, including island public schools, closed and 15 others were partially closed, leaving 95,762 people temporarily unemployed. The only agencies remaining open are security related, such as police and firefighter agencies, and health related agencies. 1,600 public schools were shut down, leaving 500,000 pupils without facilities.

On 2 May the shut down continued. The New Progressive Party held a meeting and decided to stick with the 5.5% tax proposal, stating that there wouldn't be any type of negotiation. Another meeting between the Speaker of the House of Representatives and the Governor ended in dispute with the Governor leaving less than 15 minutes after the meeting started. Protests were held also in front of the main offices of Popular, Inc. in Hato Rey and the Capitol.

On 3 May, Governor Acevedo Vilá accepted an invitation by José Aponte, Speaker of the House, to meet with him alone in the Capitol. Acevedo Vilá suggested to Aponte that Senator Kenneth McClintock, President of the Senate, should be present. Aponte didn't agree. Acevedo Vilá arrived to the Capitol in company of Alfredo Salazar, the President of the Puerto Rico Government Development Bank, Juan Carlos Méndez, Secretary of Treasury, and Aníbal José Torres, Secretary of Government.

Aponte, as agreed, asked Acevedo Vilá to meet alone with him. Fifteen minutes after the meeting Acevedo Vilá left abruptly. According to Acevedo Vilá, Aponte began to complain at some point during the meeting, specifically mentioning that a few days earlier, the Secretary of Treasury changed the financial numbers given under oath in a public hearing, and that the Secretary was absent in a meeting one week earlier, making it difficult for the House to reach him. At some point during the meeting, Acevedo Vilá noticed a smiling face in Aponte and commented that he was happy to see him smile during such time of crisis.

At this point, versions differ. Allegedly, Aponte told Acevedo Vilá that he has "seen the face of distress" of Acevedo Vilá in recent days, and that if he needed a handkerchief for his tears, he could let him know. At that point Acevedo Vilá left, feeling that "it was an insult to the Puerto Rican people left in the streets". Aponte denied this, and accused the Governor of lying.

On 4 May, Acevedo Vilá marched from La Fortaleza, the Governor's house, to the Capitol. It was the first time in Puerto Rican history that such an event has happened. In Puerto Rican custom, the Governor walks from the Capitol to La Fortaleza when he takes the oath of office. Acevedo Vilá was criticized due to the similarities between this march and an episode of the TV series The West Wing, in which the President of the United States (portrayed by Martin Sheen) walks from the White House, home of the President, to the U.S. Capitol, home of the U.S. Congress, in order to resolve a federal budget crisis.

On 8 May, Moody's downgraded Puerto Rico's general obligation debt to Baa3 from Baa2, and appropriation bonds to junk status at Ba1 from Baa3.

== Settlement ==
On 4 May, the first signs of compromise emerged as the Senate approved a new budget-balancing package which proposed a 5.9% sales tax and a corporation tax to be placed only on corporations with earnings of more than ten million dollars. This deal was still not approved by the House. An emergency commission was formed on 8 May under the Archbishop of San Juan, which negotiated with the Governor, the Legislature and the banks.

It reported on 10 May and brokered a deal which was accepted in the early hours of the following morning. Under the deal, the legislature will approve the emergency loan to finance Puerto Rico's $740 million shortfall. Having won approval by the Legislature, the Governor signed the budget-balancing package into law on 13 May, officially ending the shutdown.

The Legislature has since approved a sales and use tax, with a portion set aside for repaying the loan. The NPP leadership insisted on a maximum combined sales tax of 5.5% (4% state and 1.5% municipal), but the NPP team working on the proposed legislation botched the document and placed wording in it that made the state sales tax 5.5%, for a total of 7%. The Senate immediately recognized the error and placed the bill for immediate approval.

Once it was approved, it was revealed that no Senators from the Rosselló faction of the NPP had read the bill, and they had approved with their votes exactly what Governor Acevedo Vilá wanted. The House then attempted to block the bill from reaching the Governor for his signature, but the Puerto Rico Supreme Court ordered the Speaker to complete the process. Just prior to the beginning of the sales tax enactment on 15 November, former Governor Carlos Romero Barceló filed a lawsuit attempting to derail the initiation of the tax, but that too failed to gain any traction in the Courts, and businesses began collecting the new tax on 15 November.

== See also ==
- Puerto Rican debt crisis
