= Puerto Rico Science, Technology and Research Trust =

- Fideicomiso para Ciencia, Tecnología e Investigación de Puerto Rico
- Formation: 2004; 21 years ago
- Type: Nonprofit organization
- Headquarters: San Juan, Puerto Rico
- Executive Director: Lucy A. Crespo (2015–present)
- Website: Official website

The Puerto Rico Science, Technology and Research Trust (PRSTRT) is a nonprofit institution established in 2004 with the mandate to invest in, facilitate, and promote science, technology, and innovation in Puerto Rico. The organization focuses on research commercialization, entrepreneurship support, public health capacity building, and STEM education.

== Programs ==
The Trust operates programs divided into four areas: Research and Development, Entrepreneurship, Public Health, and Education.

=== Research and Development ===
Center for Tropical Biodiversity and Conservation logo

- Puerto Rico Consortium for Clinical Investigation (PRCCI): Provides infrastructure, regulatory support, and training for clinical trials, creating partnerships with academic centers and the biopharmaceutical industry.

Technology Transfer Office logo]]

- Technology Transfer Office (TTO): Provides commercialization assistance, intellectual property consulting, licensing negotiation, and industry partnership brokering.
- Research Grants Program: Issues competitive funding calls in biotechnology, environmental science, digital health, and medical devices, prioritizing translational projects.
- Center for Tropical Biodiversity and Conservation: Conducts research on native species, climate impact, and coastal vulnerability and supports conservation policy.

=== Entrepreneurship ===
Colmena66 logo

- Colmena66: A business support platform that routes entrepreneurs to mentorship, funding, accelerators, regulatory guidance, and federal innovation programs.

Fase1 logo

- Fase1: Offers pre-acceleration resources, prototyping assistance, and business validation through two tracks: Lab and Intensive.

Parallel18 logo

- Parallel18: Originally launched as a global startup accelerator, Parallel18 transitioned in 2025 to a strategic early-stage investment platform. The shift discontinued the Pre18 and BioLeap tracks, replacing them with direct capital deployment, portfolio scaling, and investor syndication.

=== Public health ===
PRPHI logo

- Puerto Rico Public Health Institute (PRPHI): Established as a reorganized division in 2025 (formerly Public Health Trust). PRPHI focuses on epidemiology, chronic disease surveillance, emergency response readiness, digital health analytics, and public health workforce development. In 2025 the institute:
  - deployed a cloud-based epidemiology data hub,
  - expanded municipal partnerships for outbreak response,
  - launched an emergency communication protocol training network,
  - adopted artificial intelligence tools for vector surveillance,
  - and strengthened international agreements with research groups in the Caribbean and Latin America.
- Puerto Rico Vector Control Unit (PRVCU): Implements mosquito surveillance, geospatial monitoring, public outreach campaigns, and genetically-informed risk modeling.

=== Education ===
Science City logo

- Science City: A master-planned innovation district hosting labs, co-working space, university partnerships, and public STEM exhibits. Construction and phased deployment continued through 2025 with an increased focus on translational biotechnology.

== Governance ==
The Trust is governed by a board composed of private sector leaders, academic advisors, technology executives, and government representatives. Advisory committees evaluate grant proposals, commercial viability, and health policy priorities.

== Funding ==
The institution receives funding from:

- Special allocations from the government of Puerto Rico,
- Federal research grants,
- Philanthropic contributions,
- Private partnerships,
- Investment returns from programs such as Parallel18.

In 2025, PRPHI secured expanded access to CDC cooperative agreements and emergency preparedness grants.

== Impact ==
By 2025 the Trust had:

- supported over 1,000 local startups,
- contributed to technology workforce training,
- facilitated over 300 clinical trials through PRCCI,
- developed island-wide vector risk modeling,
- and established a distributed public health training ecosystem.

== Partnerships ==
The Trust maintains collaborations with:

- CDC Dengue Branch,
- U.S. NIH trial networks,
- Caribbean Public Health Agency (CARPHA),
- local universities and municipal health departments.

== Controversies ==
Some critics have raised concerns about uneven funding distribution and regional access to entrepreneurship programs. Program administrators have responded with outreach expansions and remote participation opportunities.

== Future projects ==
Planned initiatives include:

- island-wide environmental sensor networks,
- community-based chronic disease monitoring pilots,
- expanded accelerator-to-investment pathways,
- biotechnology wet-lab co-development hubs.
