= Act 22 of 2012 =

2012 law passed as an effort that wealthy investors relocate to Puerto Rico

Act 22 of 2012 —also known as the Act to Promote the Relocation of Investors to Puerto Rico (Spanish: Ley para Incentivar el Traslado de Inversionistas a Puerto Rico)— is an act enacted by the 16th Legislative Assembly of Puerto Rico that exempts local taxes on certain passive income generated by individuals that reside in Puerto Rico.

To ignite the interest of these new investors, Act 22 provides an exemption from Puerto Rico income taxes on certain types of passive income attained or accrued after the individual establishes residency.

As of March 2013, only about a dozen individuals have taken advantage of the act, although many others have expressed their interest after the media reported that billionaire John Paulson was considering to relocate to Puerto Rico. The report was later denied by Paulson but media coverage increased inquiries to local accountancy firms by 400% after the story broke.

Act 22 is one of a set of economic incentives that the Government of Puerto Rico has developed for the development of the Island's economy. Additional incentives offer unique benefits to investors for sectors like manufacturing, hospitality and tourism, international insurance and banking, export services, and agriculture.

Requirements

- Physical Presence: the investor has to be physically present in Puerto Rico 168-183 days per year, and in the United States for less than 90 days in the year.
- The restrictions may have been modified to require only that the investor have spent more time in Puerto Rico than any other single place in the world.
- The restrictions may have added a requirement that the investor make a minimum five thousand dollar per year donation to a Puerto Rico registered non-profit organization.
- Act 22 is for individual investors and not for corporations. Act 20 was established for corporations including Microsoft and Hewlett Packard.
- Tax Home Test
- Closer Connections Test: a series of factors to determine if the investor has maintained more significant contacts with Puerto Rico than with the United States of foreign country

Benefits

- 0% tax on dividend and interest income, short-and-long term capital gains for new Puerto Rico residents, and on federal taxes on Puerto Rico-sourced income.
- Tax savings on investment portfolio returns.
- Tax decree is valid until 2036.

The act has come under criticism. In early 2021, in the aftermath of the victory for statehood in the 2020 statehood referendum, Act 22 emerged as a stumbling-block to Puerto Rico statehood. Senate Majority leader Chuck Schumer declared opposition to a pro-statehood bill and criticized Act 22.

Some claim the act was enacted to promote the displacement of native Puerto Rican citizens from the island in hope of exhibiting further colonialist control over Puerto Rico. Skeptics include Jeffrey Farrow, a former White House official from the Clinton administration, and John Buckley, a former tax counsel for the Democratic Party on the United States House Committee on Ways and Means, who have described the act as a way to make Puerto Rico a tax haven. Congressmen Chuck Grassley (R-Iowa) and Max Baucus (D-Montana), Chairman of the United States Senate Finance Committee, have also expressed their opinion on the matter. Others, however, such as José Pérez Riera and Alberto Bacó Bagué, both former Secretary of Economic Development and Commerce of Puerto Rico, and current Secretary Manuel A. Laboy Rivera, see the act favorably and describe it as being a way for Puerto Rico to overcome its economic struggles and its six years long recession.

In May 2024, the Puerto Rico No Se Vende coalition, Hedge Clippers, and the Center for Popular Democracy released a report on the outsized access and influence that Act 22 beneficiaries have over Puerto Rico’s elected officials. Between 2013 and 2023, Act 22 beneficiaries made over $1 million in political donations. This money went to twenty-one different Puerto Rican elected officials, in addition to direct donations to the Popular Democratic Party (PPD) and the New Progressive Party (PNP), the two main political parties in Puerto Rico.

In October 2024, members of the United States House of Representatives introduce a resolution in Congress to end Act 22.
