= List of justices of the Supreme Court of Puerto Rico =

The chronology of membership on the Supreme Court of Puerto Rico begins in 1898 and is grouped below under successive chief justices.

== List ==
Supreme Court of Puerto Rico
Severo Quiñones Court
Chief Justice: José Severo Quiñones (1900–1909)
1898–1899:	Maragliano | Hernández Santiago | de Diego Martínez | Figueras | Nieto Abeillé | Roméu Aguayo
1898–1899:	Maragliano | Hernández Santiago | Figueras | Nieto Abeillé | Roméu Aguayo
1899:	Maragliano | Hernández Santiago | Figueras | Nieto Abeillé | Roméu Aguayo | Acosta Quintero
1899:	Maragliano | Hernández Santiago | Figueras | Nieto Abeillé | Roméu Aguayo | Acosta Quintero | Cuchí Arnau
1899:	Hernández Santiago | Figueras | Nieto Abeillé | Roméu Aguayo | Acosta Quintero | Cuchí Arnau | Acuña Aybar
1899–1900:	Hernández Santiago | Figueras | Nieto Abeillé | Morera Martínez
1900–1901:	Hernández Santiago | Figueras | Nieto Abeillé | Sulzbacher
1901:	Hernández Santiago | Figueras | Sulzbacher
1901–1904:	Hernández Santiago | Figueras | Sulzbacher | McLeary
1904–1909:	Hernández Santiago | Figueras | McLeary | Wolf
Hernández Santiago Court
Chief Justice: José Hernández Santiago (1909–1922)
1909–1910:	Figueras | McLeary | Wolf | del Toro Cuebas
1910–1911:	McLeary | Wolf | del Toro Cuebas
1911–1914:	McLeary | Wolf | del Toro Cuebas | de Aldrey Montolio
1911–1914:	McLeary | Wolf | del Toro Cuebas | de Aldrey Montolio
1914–1922:	Wolf | del Toro Cuebas | de Aldrey Montolio | Hutchinson
del Toro Cuebas Court
Chief Justice: Emilio del Toro Cuebas (1922–1943)
1922:	Wolf | de Aldrey Montolio | Hutchinson
1922–1927:	Wolf | de Aldrey Montolio | Hutchinson | Franco Soto
1927–1928:	Wolf | de Aldrey Montolio | Hutchinson
1928–1931:	Wolf | de Aldrey Montolio | Hutchinson | Texidor y Alcalá del Olmo
1931–1932:	Wolf | de Aldrey Montolio | Hutchinson
1932–1935:	Wolf | de Aldrey Montolio | Hutchinson | Córdova Dávila
1935–1936:	Wolf | Hutchinson | Córdova Dávila
1936–1938:	Wolf | Hutchinson | Córdova Dávila | Travieso
1938:	Wolf | Hutchinson | Travieso
1938–1940:	Wolf | Hutchinson | Travieso | de Jesús Sánchez
1940–1941:	Travieso | de Jesús Sánchez
1941–1942:	Travieso | de Jesús Sánchez | Todd Borrás
1942–1943:	Travieso | de Jesús Sánchez | Todd Borrás | Snyder
Travieso Court
Chief Justice: Martín Travieso (1944–1948)
1944–1945:	de Jesús Sánchez | Todd Borrás | Snyder
1945–1946:	de Jesús Sánchez | Todd Borrás | Snyder | Córdova Díaz
1946–1947:	de Jesús Sánchez | Todd Borrás | Snyder
1947–1948:	de Jesús Sánchez | Todd Borrás | Snyder | Marrero Ríos
de Jesús Sánchez Court
Chief Justice: Angel de Jesús Sánchez (1948–1951)
1948–1951:	Todd Borrás | Snyder | Marrero Ríos | Negrón Fernández
Todd Borrás Court
Chief Justice: Roberto Todd Borrás (1951–1952)
1951–1952:	Snyder | Marrero Ríos | Negrón Fernández
1952:	Snyder | Marrero Ríos | Negrón Fernández | Ortiz Ortiz | Sifre Dávila | Pérez Pimentel
Snyder Court
Chief Justice: A. Cecil Snyder (1953–1957)
1953–1954:	Marrero Ríos | Negrón Fernández | Ortiz Ortiz | Sifre Dávila | Pérez Pimentel | Belaval Maldonado
1954–1955:	Marrero Ríos | Negrón Fernández | Sifre Dávila | Pérez Pimentel | Belaval Maldonado
1955–1957:	Marrero Ríos | Negrón Fernández | Sifre Dávila | Pérez Pimentel | Belaval Maldonado | Saldaña Amadeo
1957:	Negrón Fernández | Sifre Dávila | Pérez Pimentel | Belaval Maldonado | Saldaña Amadeo
Sifre Dávila Court
Chief Justice: Jaime Sifre Dávila (1957)
1957:	Negrón Fernández | Pérez Pimentel | Belaval Maldonado | Saldaña Amadeo
Negrón Fernández Court
Chief Justice: Luis Negrón Fernández (1957–1972)
1957–1961:	Pérez Pimentel | Belaval Maldonado | Saldaña Amadeo | Hernández Matos | Santana Becerra | Serrano Geyls
1961:	Pérez Pimentel | Belaval Maldonado | Hernández Matos | Santana Becerra | Serrano Geyls | Blanco Lugo
1961–1962:	Pérez Pimentel | Belaval Maldonado | Hernández Matos | Santana Becerra | Serrano Geyls | Blanco Lugo | Rigau Gaztambide | Dávila Dávila
1962:	Pérez Pimentel | Belaval Maldonado | Hernández Matos | Santana Becerra | Blanco Lugo | Rigau Gaztambide | Dávila Dávila
1962–1968:	Pérez Pimentel | Belaval Maldonado | Hernández Matos | Santana Becerra | Blanco Lugo | Rigau Gaztambide | Dávila Dávila | Ramírez Bages
1968:	Pérez Pimentel | Hernández Matos | Santana Becerra | Blanco Lugo | Rigau Gaztambide | Dávila Dávila | Ramírez Bages
1968–1970:	Pérez Pimentel | Hernández Matos | Santana Becerra | Rigau Gaztambide | Dávila Dávila | Ramírez Bages | Torres Rigual | Blanco Lugo
1970–1971:	Pérez Pimentel | Hernández Matos | Santana Becerra | Rigau Gaztambide | Dávila Dávila | Ramírez Bages | Torres Rigual | Martínez Muñoz
1971:	Pérez Pimentel | Hernández Matos | Rigau Gaztambide | Dávila Dávila | Ramírez Bages | Torres Rigual | Martínez Muñoz
1971–1972:	Pérez Pimentel | Hernández Matos | Rigau Gaztambide | Dávila Dávila | Ramírez Bages | Torres Rigual | Martínez Muñoz | Martín Taboas
Pérez Pimentel Court
Chief Justice: Pedro Pérez Pimentel (1973–1974)
1973:	Rigau Gaztambide | Dávila Dávila | Torres Rigual | Martínez Muñoz | Martín Taboas | Cadilla Ginorio
1973:	Rigau Gaztambide | Dávila Dávila | Torres Rigual | Martínez Muñoz | Martín Taboas | Cadilla Ginorio | Díaz Cruz
1973:	Rigau Gaztambide | Dávila Dávila | Torres Rigual | Martínez Muñoz | Martín Taboas | Cadilla Ginorio | Díaz Cruz | Irizarry Yunqué
1973–1974:	Rigau Gaztambide | Dávila Dávila | Torres Rigual | Martín Taboas | Cadilla Ginorio | Díaz Cruz | Irizarry Yunqué
Trías Monge Court
Chief Justice: José Trías Monge (1974–1985)
1974:	Rigau Gaztambide | Dávila Dávila | Torres Rigual | Martín Taboas | Cadilla Ginorio | Díaz Cruz | Irizarry Yunqué
1974–1975:	Rigau Gaztambide | Dávila Dávila | Torres Rigual | Martín Taboas | Cadilla Ginorio | Díaz Cruz | Irizarry Yunqué | Negrón García
1975–1981:	Rigau Gaztambide | Dávila Dávila | Torres Rigual | Martín Taboas | Díaz Cruz | Irizarry Yunqué | Negrón García
1981–1982:	Dávila Dávila | Torres Rigual | Martín Taboas | Díaz Cruz | Irizarry Yunqué | Negrón García
1982:	Dávila Dávila | Torres Rigual | Díaz Cruz | Irizarry Yunqué | Negrón García
1982–1984:	Dávila Dávila | Torres Rigual | Díaz Cruz | Irizarry Yunqué | Negrón García | Rebollo López
1984–1985:	Torres Rigual | Irizarry Yunqué | Negrón García | Rebollo López
1985:	Irizarry Yunqué | Negrón García | Rebollo López
1985:	Irizarry Yunqué | Negrón García | Rebollo López | Ortiz Gustafson
1985:	Irizarry Yunqué | Negrón García | Rebollo López| Ortiz Gustafson | Naveira Merly | Hernández Denton
Pons Núñez Court
Chief Justice: Víctor Pons Núñez (1985–1992)
1985–1986:	Irizarry Yunqué | Negrón García | Rebollo López | Ortiz Gustafson | Naveira Merly | Hernández Denton
1986–1990:	Negrón García | Rebollo López | Ortiz Gustafson | Naveira Merly | Hernández Denton | Alonso Alonso
1990–1992:	Negrón García | Rebollo López | Naveira Merly | Hernández Denton | Alonso Alonso | Andréu García
Andréu García Court
Chief Justice: José Andréu García (1992–2003)
1992:	Negrón García | Rebollo López| Naveira Merly | Hernández Denton | Alonso Alonso
1992–1995:	Negrón García | Rebollo López | Naveira Merly | Hernández Denton | Alonso Alonso | Fuster Berlingeri
1995–2000:	Negrón García | Rebollo López | Naveira Merly | Hernández Denton | Fuster Berlingeri | Corrada del Río
2000–2003:	Rebollo López | Naveira Merly | Hernández Denton | Fuster Berlingeri | Corrada del Río | Rivera Pérez
Naveira Merly Court
Chief Justice: Miriam Naveira Merly (2003–2004)
2003–2004:	Rebollo López | Hernández Denton | Fuster Berlingeri | Corrada del Río | Rivera Pérez
2004:	Rebollo López | Hernández Denton | Fuster Berlingeri | Corrada del Río | Rivera Pérez | Fiol Matta
Hernández Denton Court
Chief Justice: Federico Hernández Denton (2004–2014)
2004:	Rebollo López | Fuster Berlingeri | Corrada del Río | Rivera Pérez | Fiol Matta
2004–2005:	Rebollo López | Fuster Berlingeri | Corrada del Río | Rivera Pérez | Fiol Matta | Rodríguez Rodríguez
2005–2007:	Rebollo López | Fuster Berlingeri | Rivera Pérez | Fiol Matta | Rodríguez Rodríguez
2007–2008:	Rebollo López | Rivera Pérez | Fiol Matta | Rodríguez Rodríguez
2008–2009:	Rivera Pérez | Fiol Matta | Rodríguez Rodríguez
2009–2010:	Rivera Pérez | Fiol Matta | Rodríguez Rodríguez | Martínez Torres | Pabón Charneco | Kolthoff Caraballo
2010–2014:	Fiol Matta | Rodríguez Rodríguez | Martínez Torres | Pabón Charneco | Kolthoff Caraballo | Rivera García | Feliberti Cintrón | Estrella Martínez
Fiol Matta Court
Chief Justice: Liana Fiol Matta (2014–2016)
2014:	Rodríguez Rodríguez | Martínez Torres | Pabón Charneco | Kolthoff Caraballo | Rivera García | Feliberti Cintrón | Estrella Martínez
2014–2016:	Rodríguez Rodríguez | Martínez Torres | Pabón Charneco | Kolthoff Caraballo | Rivera García | Feliberti Cintrón | Estrella Martínez | Oronoz Rodríguez
Oronoz Rodríguez Court
Chief Justice: Maite Oronoz Rodríguez (2016–)
2016:	Rodríguez Rodríguez | Martínez Torres | Pabón Charneco | Kolthoff Caraballo | Rivera García | Feliberti Cintrón | Estrella Martínez
2016:	Rodríguez Rodríguez | Martínez Torres | Pabón Charneco | Kolthoff Caraballo | Rivera García | Feliberti Cintrón | Estrella Martínez | Colón-Pérez
2020:	Martínez Torres | Pabón Charneco | Kolthoff Caraballo | Rivera García | Feliberti Cintrón | Estrella Martínez | Colón-Pérez
2025:	Martínez Torres | Pabón Charneco | Kolthoff Caraballo | Rivera García | Feliberti Cintrón | Estrella Martínez | Colón-Pérez | Candelario López | Rivera Pérez
