= Antonio Negrón García =

Member of Supreme Court of Puerto Rico (1940–2025)

Associate Justice of the Supreme Court of Puerto Rico
- In office 1974–2000
- Nominated by: Rafael Hernández Colón
- Preceded by: Héctor Martínez Muñoz
- Succeeded by: Efraín Rivera Pérez

Personal details
- Born: December 31, 1940 Río Piedras, Puerto Rico
- Died: June 22, 2025 (aged 84)
- Relations: Luis Negrón Fernández (father)
- Education: University of Puerto Rico (BA); University of Puerto Rico School of Law (JD)

Antonio S. Negrón García (December 31, 1940 – June 22, 2025) was a Puerto Rican jurist. He served as a municipal judge before being appointed to the Supreme Court of Puerto Rico. He served for 26 years, gaining a reputation as one of the court's most prolific justices.

== Early life ==
Negrón García was born December 31, 1940, in Río Piedras, Puerto Rico. His father was Luis Negrón Fernández, who would eventually serve as Associate Justice and Chief Justice of the Court. He earned a B.A. from the University of Puerto Rico in 1962 and earned his Juris Doctor degree from the same in 1964.

== Law career ==
Upon being admitted to the bar that same year, Negrón García went to work as a legal advisor for the Puerto Rico Power and Water company. He served as a judge in a District Court from 1966 to 1969, at which point he was elevated to a Superior Court. From 1972 to 1974, he presided over the Governor's Judicial Appointment Advisory Committee, as well as serving as Executive Secretary of the Justice Reform Council of Puerto Rico.

== Supreme Court ==
After Trías Monge's appointment to Chief Justice in 1974, there remained one vacancy in the Supreme Court. Governor Rafael Hernández Colón had avoided filling the spot until Negrón García had fulfilled the Supreme Court's requirement for membership: ten years as a licensed jurist in Puerto Rico. At the time, at the age of 34, he was the youngest person ever to be appointed to the Supreme Court.

== Retirement and death ==
In 2000, Negrón García retired after 26 years as an Associate Justice of the Supreme Court. He was until his death a professor at the Interamerican University of Puerto Rico School of Law. He wrote occasional columns for El Nuevo Día, and he served as an advisor to the Joint Commission on the Revision of the Civil Code of Puerto Rico in the matter of torts.

Negrón García died on June 22, 2025, at the age of 84. Puerto Rico Supreme Court Chief Justice Maite Oronoz Rodríguez expresses condolences on the passing of Antonio Negrón García.

== Sources ==
- La Justicia en sus Manos by Luis Rafael Rivera, ISBN 1-57581-884-1

Legal offices
Preceded by Héctor Martínez Muñoz	Associate Justice to the Supreme Court of Puerto Rico; 1974–2000	Succeeded by Efraín Rivera Pérez
