= Baltasar Corrada del Río =

Puerto Rican politician (1935–2018)

Baltazar Corrada del Río
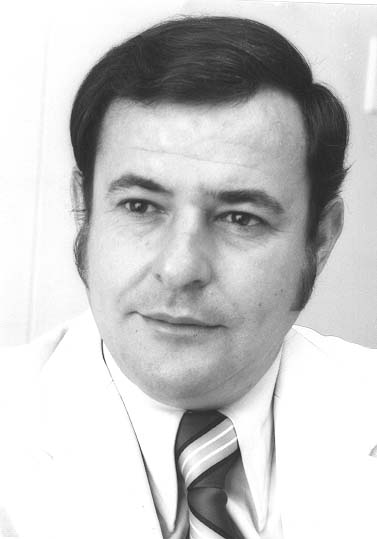

Associate Justice of the Puerto Rico Supreme Court
- In office July 15, 1995 – April 10, 2005
- Appointed by: Pedro Rosselló
- Preceded by: Rafael Alonso Alonso
- Succeeded by: Rafael Martínez Torres

Secretary of State of Puerto Rico
- In office January 2, 1993 – July 15, 1995
- Governor: Pedro Rosselló
- Preceded by: Salvador M. Padilla Escabi
- Succeeded by: Norma Burgos

Mayor of San Juan
- In office January 2, 1985 – January 2, 1989
- Preceded by: Hernán Padilla
- Succeeded by: Héctor Luis Acevedo

Resident Commissioner of Puerto Rico
- In office January 3, 1977 – January 2, 1985
- Preceded by: Jaime Benítez Rexach
- Succeeded by: Jaime Fuster

Personal details
- Born: April 10, 1935 Morovis, Puerto Rico
- Died: March 11, 2018 (aged 82) Fort Myers, Florida, U.S.
- Party: New Progressive
- Other political affiliations: Democratic (before 1985); Republican (1985–2018)
- Spouse: Beatriz Betance
- Education: University of Puerto Rico (BSS); University of Puerto Rico School of Law (LLB)

Baltasar Corrada del Río (April 10, 1935 – March 11, 2018) was a Puerto Rican politician. He held various high political offices in the island, including President of the Puerto Rico Civil Rights Commission, Resident Commissioner (1977–1985), Mayor of the capital city of San Juan (1985–1989), Puerto Rico's 15th Secretary of State (1993–1995) and Associate Justice of the Supreme Court (1995–2005). He was also the unsuccessful NPP candidate for Governor in the elections of 1988.

== Education ==
Corrada del Río obtained his high school diploma from Colegio Ponceño de Varones in 1952, and both his bachelor's degree in Social Studies in 1956 and his law degree from the University of Puerto Rico in 1959. He was admitted to the Puerto Rico Bar that year and practiced as a private lawyer from 1969 to 1975.

== Political career ==
In 1976, after initially expressing an interest in becoming Mayor of San Juan and running in an unofficial internal primary within the NPP, Corrada del Río was elected Resident Commissioner of Puerto Rico.

During his tenure (1977–1985), he advocated for the admission of Puerto Rico into the Union and co-founded the Congressional Hispanic Caucus Institute. Corrada served as Mayor of San Juan, Puerto Rico, from 1985 to 1989 (having won the 1984 mayoral election).

In the elections of 1988, Corrada made an unsuccessful bid to become Governor of Puerto Rico. He was defeated by incumbent Governor Rafael Hernández Colón.

In January 1993, Pedro Rosselló became Governor and appointed Corrada as Puerto Rico's 15th Secretary of State. Later, in 1995, Rosselló appointed Corrada as Associate Justice of the Supreme Court of Puerto Rico. He took the oath of office on July 15, 1995, after unanimous confirmation in the Senate of Puerto Rico. During his tenure as Associate Justice, Corrada was among the moderate/conservative voices in the Court, usually adhering to strict interpretations of the Constitution while practicing a firm type of judicial restraint.

The Constitution of Puerto Rico mandates an obligatory retirement for the Justices of the Supreme Court at age 70. Corrada arrived at this age in April, 2005, and was forced to retire. Prior to his retirement, Corrada publicly asked for an amendment to the Constitution that would repeal the obligatory retirement age for the justices, arguing that by obligating people to retire the constitution is discriminating by reason of age. At the time of its enactment in 1952, the average life expectancy in Puerto Rico was 61 years, 9 less than the mandatory retirement age. In 2013, the mandatory retirement age was 9 years less than the average life expectancy of 79.

The Court seat left vacant by Corrada remained vacant until 2009. Governor Aníbal Acevedo Vilá did not nominate anyone for the position after then-Senate President Kenneth McClintock made it clear in his inaugural speech as Senate president in 2005 that only a well-qualified statehooder would muster the votes for Senate confirmation to Court seats previously held by statehooders in order to assure "balance" on the bench. He was eventually succeeded in 2009 by Rafael Martinez-Torres, appointed by a Corrada protege, governor Luis Fortuño.

Upon his retirement from the Puerto Rico Supreme Court, he announced that he would abstain from political activity for one year, and, on 14 March 2006, he announced that within a month would begin attending New Progressive Party of Puerto Rico meetings, as former party president, to provide discrete advice. He also publicly disagreed with then-party president Pedro Rossello by objecting to the expulsion of then-Senate President Kenneth McClintock and then-Vice President Orlando Parga from the party for refusing to turn over the Senate presidency to Rossello. The expulsion was later revoked by the Supreme Court.

== Personal life ==
He was the brother of Álvaro Corrada del Rio, Roman Catholic Bishop of Mayagüez, Puerto Rico and of a Roman Catholic nun. Another of his sisters was the Puerto Rico Independence Party candidate for mayor of San Juan in 1988, when he was elected to the post. He was married to Beatriz Betances, who served as First Lady of San Juan during his term as mayor, and had one daughter, Ana Isabel, three sons: Juan Carlos, Jose and Francisco; as well as several grandchildren: James Gregg, Michael Gregg, Alexis Marie, and Mayra. In 2013 his wife died he was too ill to travel for the funeral services held in Morovis, Puerto Rico.

== Death ==
Baltasar Corrada del Río died on Sunday March 11, 2018, in Fort Myers, Florida at 82 years of age. By the time of his death he suffered from Alzheimer's disease. His ashes were interred at the farm where he was born in Morovis, Puerto Rico on March 24, 2018.

== Honors and recognitions ==
The Congressional Hispanic Caucus Institute (CHCI) issued a medal honoring Corrada and three other founding members.

In 2010, former Puerto Rico Secretary of State McClintock designated the department's summer internship program as the Baltasar Corrada del Río State Department Internship Program. Distinguished students such as Josue Rivera, former National President of the Puerto Rico Statehood Students Association, participated in the First Class of interns.

On November 24, 2010, a ceremony was held at the Puerto Rico Department of State to announce the publication of Baltasar Corrada Del Río-Sus opiniones 1995-2005 a book containing excerpts from 61 of his Supreme Court opinions edited by Pontifical Catholic University Law School dean Angel González Román, at which Acting Governor Kenneth McClintock and Chief Justice Federico Hernandez Denton were the keynote speakers.

== See also ==
- List of Hispanic Americans in the United States Congress

U.S. House of Representatives
Preceded by Jaime Benítez Rexach	Resident Commissioner of Puerto Rico; 1977–1985	Succeeded by Jaime Fuster
Political offices
Preceded by Hernán Padilla	Mayor of San Juan; 1985–1989	Succeeded by Héctor Luis Acevedo
Preceded by Salvador M. Padilla Escabi	Secretary of State of Puerto Rico; 1993–1995	Succeeded by Norma Burgos
Party political offices
Preceded by Carlos Romero Barceló	Chair of the Puerto Rico New Progressive Party; 1987–1988	Succeeded by Ramón Luis Rivera
Preceded by Carlos Romero Barceló	New Progressive nominee for Governor of Puerto Rico; 1988	Succeeded by Pedro Rosselló
Legal offices
Preceded by Rafael Alonso Alonso	Associate Justice of the Puerto Rico Supreme Court; 1995–2005	Succeeded by Rafael Martínez Torres
