= Irizarry =

Irizarry is a Basque family name from Northern Spain and Southern France. It is especially associated with Puerto Rico. Notable people with the surname include:

- Anibal Irizarry, Puerto Rican soldier, recipient of the Distinguished Service Cross during World War II
- Aníbal González Irizarry (1927–2018), Puerto Rican educator, journalist and news broadcaster
- Carlos Irizarry Yunqué (1922–2015), Puerto Rican judge
- Estelle Irizarry (1937-2017), Costa Rican professor of Hispanic literature.
- Dora Irizarry (born 1955), American judge
- Edwin Irizarry Mora (born 1961), Puerto Rican economist, professor and politician
- Gloria Irizarry, American actress, known for Angel and Big Joe
- Guillermo Irizarry (1916–2017), Puerto Rican statesman, economist and agronomist
- Janina Irizarry (born 1983), Puerto Rican singer
- Luis Irizarry Pabón (born 1958), 136th Mayor of Ponce, Puerto Rico
- Orlando Irizarry, Puerto Rican beach volleyball player
- Ramón López Irizarry (1897–1982), Puerto Rican educator and scientist
- Vincent Irizarry (born 1959), American actor
- Ylce Irizarry (born 1971), Puerto Rican and Dominican professor of Latinx Studies
- Wanda Irizarry, Puerto Rican beauty queen
