= Rafael Nieto =

Rafael Nieto may refer to:

- Rafael Nieto (politician) (1884–1926), Mexican politician, early 20th century, see Governor of San Luis Potosí
- Rafael Nieto Abeillé (d. 1916), Cuban judge and Puerto Rican Attorney General
- Rafael Nieto Loaiza (b. 1966), Colombian jurist, political analyst
- Rafael Nieto Navia (b. 1938), Colombian jurist, judge, ambassador
