= Jaime Fuster =

Puerto Rican politician (1941–2007)

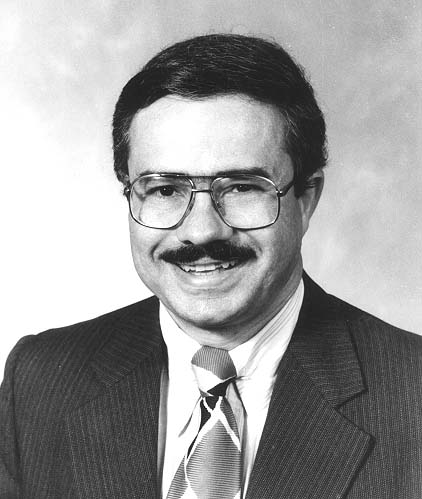

Associate Justice of the Puerto Rico Supreme Court
- In office March 4, 1992 – December 3, 2007
- Appointed by: Rafael Hernández Colón
- Preceded by: José Andreu García
- Succeeded by: Mildred Pabón

Resident Commissioner of Puerto Rico
- In office January 3, 1985 – March 4, 1992
- Preceded by: Baltasar Corrada del Río
- Succeeded by: Antonio Colorado

Dean of the University of Puerto Rico School of Law
- In office 1974–1978
- Preceded by: David Helfeld
- Succeeded by: Carlos G. Cadilla

Personal details
- Born: Jaime Benito Fuster Berlingeri; January 12, 1941 Guayama, Puerto Rico
- Died: December 3, 2007 (aged 66) Guaynabo, Puerto Rico
- Party: Popular Democratic
- Other political affiliations: Democratic
- Education: University of Notre Dame (BA); University of Puerto Rico, Río Piedras (LLB); Columbia Law School (LLM)

Jaime Benito Fuster Berlingeri (January 12, 1941 – December 3, 2007) was a politician who served as an Associate Justice to the Supreme Court of Puerto Rico. Justice Fuster, along with Justice Liana Fiol Matta, was considered the leading liberal voice in the Puerto Rico Supreme Court.

== Education ==
He obtained his Bachelor's Degree from the University of Notre Dame in 1962 and his Law Degree form the University of Puerto Rico School of Law in 1965. He later obtained a Master's Degree in Law from Columbia Law School in 1966. He then received a fellowship in law and humanities at Harvard University. In 1985, he received a Doctorate, Honoris Causa, from Temple University.

== Political career ==
In 1979, Fuster was named Deputy Assistant Attorney General of the United States. He held that position until 1981. In 1984, he was elected Resident Commissioner of Puerto Rico to the United States Congress. During his tenure (1985–1992), he served a term as Chair of Congressional Hispanic Caucus. In both terms, he served on the Committee on Banking, Finance, and Urban Affairs, and on the Committee on Interior and Insular Affairs. In Congress, he was a strong advocate for educational and youth programs. He supported numerous laws and bills to give state and local governments assistance for youth service projects and programs aimed at preventing substance use. He also supported the establishment of a Children, Youth, and Families Administration, as well as the establishment of a federal child care program. He sponsored legislation to increase social security funds for families with blind, aged, and disabled dependents.

In 1992, Governor Rafael Hernández Colón appointed him to the Supreme Court of Puerto Rico. Fuster resigned from his Resident Commissioner position on March 4, 1992 to take an appointment, as associate justice of the Supreme Court of Puerto Rico. He took the oath of office on March 4, 1992 after confirmation by the Senate, serving on the Court until his death.

Fuster was affiliated with the Popular Democratic Party of Puerto Rico and the Democratic Party of the United States.

== Death ==
Fuster died during the early hours of December 3, 2007 from cardiac arrest. He was buried at Buxeda Memorial Park Cemetery in Río Piedras, Puerto Rico. His death left the Supreme Court in an unprecedented position with two seats vacant.

== See also ==
- List of Puerto Ricans
- List of Hispanic Americans in the United States Congress
- Corsican immigration to Puerto Rico
- Federico Hernández Denton, Chief Justice of the Puerto Rico Supreme Court
- Francisco Rebollo, Associate Justice of the Puerto Rico Supreme Court
- Liana Fiol Matta, Associate Justice of the Puerto Rico Supreme Court

Academic offices
Preceded by David Helfeld	Dean of the University of Puerto Rico School of Law; 1974–1978	Succeeded by Carlos G. Cadilla
U.S. House of Representatives
Preceded by Baltasar Corrada del Río	Resident Commissioner of Puerto Rico; 1985–1992	Succeeded by Antonio Colorado
Preceded by Albert Bustamante	Chair of the Congressional Hispanic Caucus; 1988–1989	Succeeded by Kika de la Garza
Legal offices
Preceded by José Andreu García	Associate Justice of the Puerto Rico Supreme Court; 1992–2007	Succeeded by Mildred Pabón
