= Luis Estrella Martínez =

Puerto Rican judge (born 1971)

Associate Justice of the Supreme Court of Puerto Rico
- Incumbent
- Assumed office May 25, 2011
- Appointed by: Luis Fortuño
- Preceded by: Seat established

Personal details
- Born: November 17, 1971 (age 54) San Juan, Puerto Rico
- Education: University of Puerto Rico, Río Piedras (BA, JD)

Luis Estrella-Martínez (born November 17, 1971) is an associate justice of the Supreme Court of Puerto Rico. Confirmed by the Senate on May 11, 2011, he took office on May 25, 2011, at the age of 39 and could serve for over 30 years until his mandatory retirement age of 70 on November 17, 2041.

== Early years ==
A high school graduate of Academia Santa Teresita, an alma mater he shares with former Governor Pedro Rosselló and Governor Fortuño's Chief of Staff Marcos Rodríguez Ema, he earned his Magna Cum Laude bachelor's degree at the University of Puerto Rico's main campus at Río Piedras while working part-time as a data entry operator, bussing tables, as well as being active in student government, where he was elected as his faculty's representative to the General Student Council, where he served as vice president. Estrella also graduated Magna Cum Laude from its law school, where he was an editor of the UPR Law Review, as well as a member of the campus' Academic Senate, representing the law school's students.

== Professional life ==
After a stint as a law clerk to Puerto Rico Court of Appeals Judge Gilberto Gierbolini, where he met two appellate judges with whom he would subsequently serve on the Supreme Court, Justices Liana Fiol Matta and Mildred Pabón, and as a legislative assistant to then Senator Kenneth McClintock and Representative Pedro Figueroa, he opened his own law office in Bayamón, Puerto Rico, where he lives, where he specialized in Administrative Law for over 10 years.

Senate of Puerto Rico President Thomas Rivera Schatz shepherded his confirmation through a committee hearing and a floor vote on May 11, 2011. The New Progressive Party majority voted in his favor while the Popular Democratic Party senators voted against the nomination.

== Private life ==
Estrella, an active marathon runner, is married to a fellow attorney, Maribel Ramos, with whom he has two daughters, all of whom live in Bayamón, Puerto Rico.

== Honors and recognitions ==
- Miguel Velázquez Debate Competition, UPR Law School, 1996, before a jury composed of Federal District Judge Daniel R. Domínguez, Justice Miriam Naveira, Appellate Judge Lady Alfonso de Cumpiano, Prof. Miguel Velázquez and then Representative, and future Governor, Aníbal Acevedo Vilá.
- Benicio Sánchez Castaño Award to the graduating law student with the highest Criminal Law average, Puerto Rico Bar Association, 1996.

== Publication ==
"Codificación de la Pena de Restitución en Puerto Rico", an article in the UPR Law Review, 1996

== See also ==
- List of Puerto Ricans

== Sources ==
Statement by Luis F. Estrella Martínez, Associate Justice nominee, Judicial and Public Safety Committee, Senate of Puerto Rico, May 11, 2011

Legal offices
Preceded by Seat Created	Associate Justice of the Supreme Court of Puerto Rico; 2011–present	Incumbent
