= Erick Kolthoff-Benners =

Puerto Rican judge

Erick Kolthoff-Benners is a Puerto Rican retired Superior Court Judge who was the first Afro-Puerto Rican member of the islands' judiciary. He was appointed by Puerto Rico Governor Carlos Romero Barceló, after having served as his legal advisor while Romero served as mayor of San Juan from 1969 to 1977.

Kolthoff is the father of Erick Kolthoff, an Associate Justice of the Supreme Court of Puerto Rico.

== See also ==
- List of Puerto Ricans
