= James McLeary =

James McLeary may refer to:

- James H. McLeary (1845–1914), American lawyer, politician, and judge
- Jamie McLeary (born 1981), Scottish golfer
- James McLeary, American psychologist and executive producer of the 2017 film The Work
