= Marco Rigau Gaztambide =

Puerto Rican judge (1919–1985)

Marco Antonio Rigau Gaztambide (March 5, 1919 – August 29, 1985) was as an associate justice of the Puerto Rico Supreme Court from 1961 until his resignation in 1981. He was a member of Fi Sigma Alfa fraternity.

== Early life and death ==
Gaztmbide was born in March 5, 1919 in Ponce, Puerto Rico.

He died from unknown causes on August 29, 1985, at the age of 66.

Legal offices
Preceded by New seat due to expansion	Associate Justice to the Supreme Court of Puerto Rico; 1961–1981	Succeeded by Francisco Rebollo López
