= Héctor Martínez Muñoz =

American judge

Associate Justice of the Supreme Court of Puerto Rico
- In office June 12, 1971 – 1973
- Appointed by: Luis A. Ferré
- Preceded by: Luis Blanco Lugo
- Succeeded by: Antonio Negrón García

Personal details
- Born: December 14, 1924 San Juan, Puerto Rico
- Died: November 14, 1991 (aged 66) San Juan, Puerto Rico
- Education: Virginia State University (BA); University of Puerto Rico School of Law (JD)
- Profession: Judge

Héctor Martínez Muñoz (December 14, 1924 – November 14, 1991) was the first member of the Supreme Court of Puerto Rico appointed by Governor Luis A. Ferré and confirmed by an opposition-controlled Senate of Puerto Rico presided by Rafael Hernández Colón.

Born in San Juan, Puerto Rico, Martínez obtained a B.A. from Virginia State University and a Juris Doctor degree in 1951 from the University of Puerto Rico School of Law. During twenty years he practiced law in the private sector but served ad honorem on the State Board of Education, as a Bar examiner and on the Legislative Committee of the Puerto Rico Bar Association.

In 1971, Gov. Ferré, after withdrawing two nominations that the opposition-led Senate was going to reject, appointed Martínez as Associate Justice. Negotiations with the Senate led to his confirmation, assuming his post on the bench on June 12, 1971. After Luis Negrón Fernández resigned on September 15, 1972 after a second stint as Chief Justice, Ferré nominated Martínez for Chief Justice but the Popular Democratic Party of Puerto Rico majority in the Senate rejected his elevation to the court's top post. Less than a year later, Martínez resigned from the bench and returned to private practice.

In the late 1970s, Governor Carlos Romero Barceló appointed him to several ad honorem posts, including the Governor's Judicial Nominations Advisory Committee and the Puerto Rico Council on Higher Education.

Justice Héctor Martínez Muñoz died on November 14, 1991 in San Juan at the age of 66.

== Sources ==
- La Justicia en sus Manos by Luis Rafael Rivera, ISBN 1-57581-884-1

Legal offices
Preceded by Luis Blanco Lugo	Associate Justice to the Supreme Court of Puerto Rico; 1971-1973	Succeeded by Antonio Negrón García
