= Martín Travieso =

Puerto Rican judge

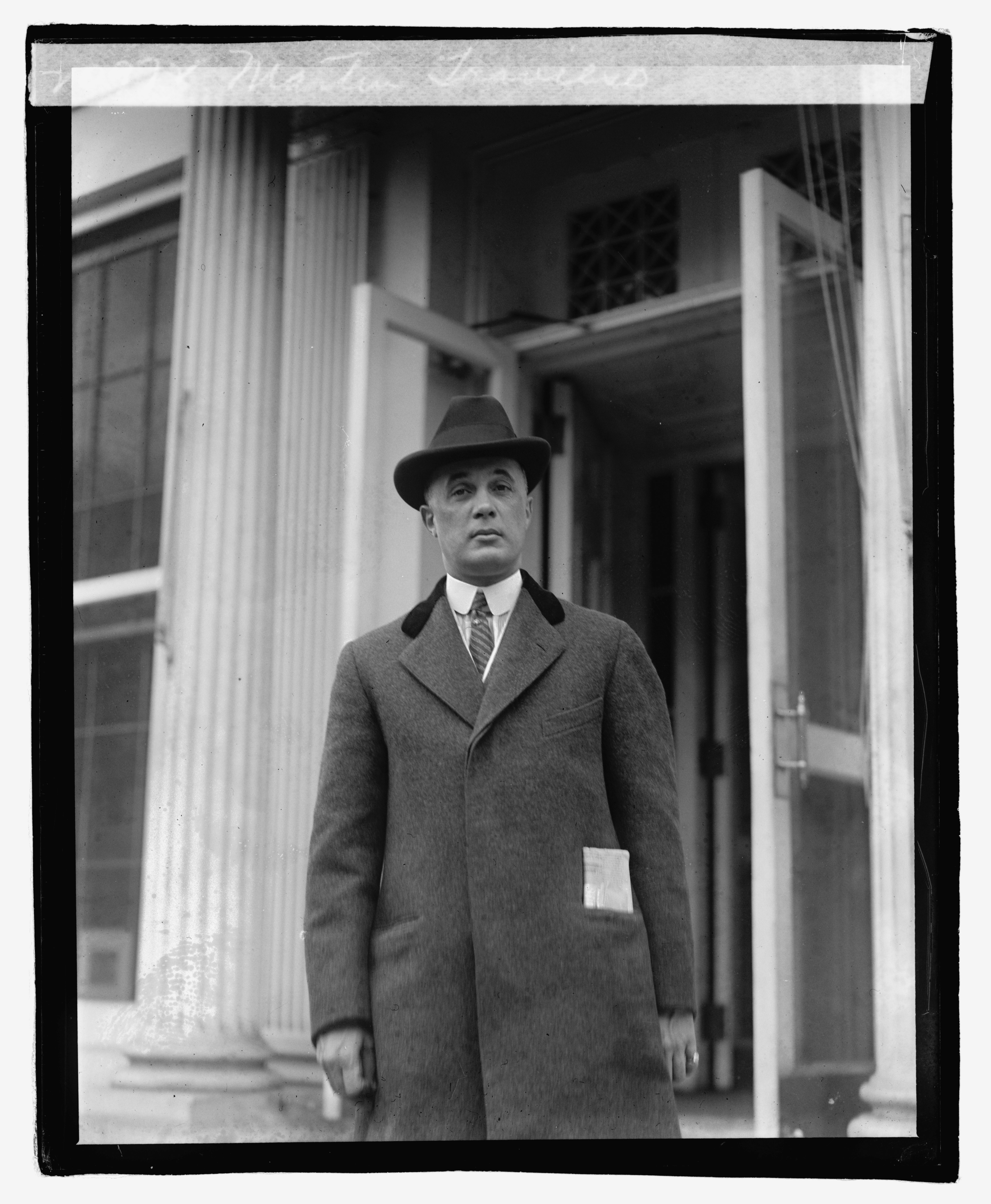

4th Chief of Justice of the Puerto Rico Supreme Court
- In office 1944–1948
- Nominated by: Franklin D. Roosevelt
- Preceded by: Emilio del Toro Cuebas
- Succeeded by: Angel de Jesús Sánchez

Mayor of San Juan
- In office 1921–1923
- Preceded by: Roberto H. Todd Weels
- Succeeded by: Rafael Díaz de Andino

Member of the Puerto Rico Senate from the at-large district
- In office 1917–1921

Personal details
- Born: July 6, 1882 Mayagüez, Puerto Rico, Spain
- Died: January 15, 1971 (aged 88) San Juan, Puerto Rico, US
- Party: Union (Before 1931); Liberal (1931–1948); Republican Statehood (1948–1967); New Progressive (1967–1971)
- Education: Cornell Law School (LLB)

Martín Travieso Nieva Jr. (July 6, 1882 – January 15, 1971) was an American politician and jurist. He was a member of the Senate of Puerto Rico from 1917 to 1921. He also served as Mayor of San Juan from 1921 to 1923.

== Biography ==
Martín Travieso was born in 1882 in Mayagüez, Puerto Rico. He received his law degree from Cornell Law School in 1903.

In 1904, Travieso joined the Union Party in Puerto Rico, serving as member of the Executive Cabinet from 1908 to 1914. In 1917, he served as provisional governor.

That same year, Travieso was elected to the first Senate of Puerto Rico. He served as senator for one term until 1921. After that, he served as Mayor of San Juan from 1921 to 1923.

Travieso left the Union Party in 1931 and joined the Liberal Party of Puerto Rico. In 1936, he was appointed by President Franklin D. Roosevelt as associate justice of the Supreme Court of Puerto Rico. He then served as Chief Justice of the Supreme Court of Puerto Rico from 1944 to 1948.

For the 1948 general elections, Travieso was a candidate for governor, representing a coalition of several parties (the Socialist Party and Puerto Rican Renewal Party, among others). However, he lost to Luis Muñoz Marín.

Travieso died in 1971 at age 88.

== See also ==
- List of Hispanic and Latino American jurists

Political offices
| Preceded by Roberto H. Todd Wells | Mayor of San Juan; 1921–1923 | Succeeded by Rafael Díaz de Andino |
Legal offices
| Preceded by Pedro de Aldrey Montolio | Associate Justice of the Puerto Rico Supreme Court; 1936–1944 | Succeeded by Pedro Pérez Pimentel |
| Preceded by Emilio del Toro Cuebas | Chief of Justice of the Puerto Rico Supreme Court; 1944–1948 | Succeeded by Angel de Jesús Sánchez |
Party political offices
| New political party | Republican Statehood nominee for Governor of Puerto Rico; 1948 | Succeeded by Francisco López Domínguez |
