= Roberto Feliberti Cintrón =

Puerto Rican judge (born 1963)

Associate Justice of the Supreme Court of Puerto Rico
- Incumbent
- Assumed office May 25, 2011
- Appointed by: Luis Fortuño
- Preceded by: Seat established

Personal details
- Born: April 7, 1963 (age 63) San Juan, Puerto Rico
- Education: Purdue University (BS); University of Puerto Rico, Río Piedras (JD)

Roberto Feliberti Cintrón (born April 7, 1963) is a Puerto Rican jurist who serves as an associate justice of the Supreme Court of Puerto Rico.

== Early years and education ==
Feliberti Cintrón was born in San Juan, Puerto Rico. He was the second of four children born to Emiliano Feliberti Martínez and Hilda Cintrón Brandes. Graduated at Colegio Nuestra Señora de la Providencia in San Juan, Puerto Rico. Thanks to a U.S. Navy scholarship, he was able to attend Purdue University, where he earned a Bachelor of Science in Mathematics. During his time in the Navy attended the Naval Justice School. He later graduated from the University of Puerto Rico School of Law in 1991.

== Professional experience ==
After graduating from Purdue, he was commissioned to the United States Navy thru the Navy ROTC. He was a Legal Officer at the Roosevelt Roads Naval Station in Ceiba, Puerto Rico, where he remained for four years of service from 1986 to 1989. After completing law school, Feliberti Cintrón began his legal career as a law clerk for the United States District Court for the District of Puerto Rico. Later, he worked at a private firm in Puerto Rico, specializing in commercial litigation, where he remained for 16 years and eventually became a partner.

== Judicial career ==
=== Court of appeals ===
On December 1, 2009, Feliberti Cintrón took a seat on the Puerto Rico Court of Appeals after being nominated by Governor Luis Fortuño.

=== Appointment to Supreme Court ===
Governor Fortuño nominated Feliberti Cintrón to a newly created seat on the Supreme Court of Puerto Rico on May 9, 2011. He was sworn in on May 25, 2011 with fellow Associate Justice Luis Estrella Martínez.

== Personal life ==
Feliberti Cintron has one daughter and three siblings. He enjoys sports, especially American football, and he is a fan of the New Orleans Saints.

Legal offices
New seat	Associate Justice of the Supreme Court of Puerto Rico; 2011–present	Incumbent
