= Jorge Luis Córdova =

Puerto Rican politician (1907–1994)

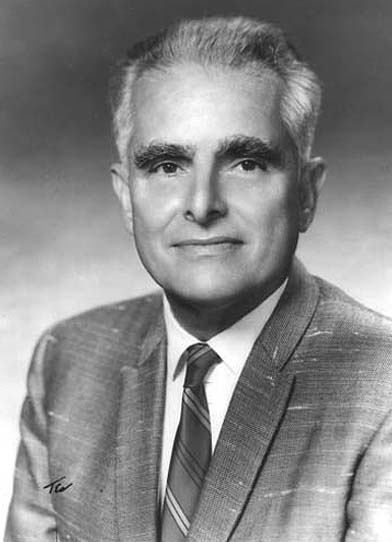

Resident Commissioner of Puerto Rico
- In office January 3, 1969 – January 3, 1973
- Preceded by: Santiago Polanco Abreu
- Succeeded by: Jaime Benítez

Associate Justice of the Supreme Court of Puerto Rico
- In office 1945–1946
- Appointed by: Harry S. Truman
- Preceded by: Martín Travieso
- Succeeded by: Borinquen Marrero Ríos

Personal details
- Born: April 20, 1907 Manatí, Puerto Rico
- Died: September 16, 1994 (aged 87) Guaynabo, Puerto Rico
- Party: New Progressive
- Other political affiliations: Republican (Before 1969, 1971–1994); Democratic (1969–1971)
- Relatives: Félix Córdova Dávila (father)
- Education: Catholic University of America (BA); Harvard Law School (LLB)

Jorge Luis Córdova Díaz (April 20, 1907 – September 16, 1994) served as Puerto Rico's 11th Resident Commissioner from 1969 to 1973. His father, Félix Córdova Dávila, had served as Puerto Rico's fourth Resident Commissioner from 1917 to 1932.

== Biography ==
Born in Manatí, Puerto Rico, Córdova was a 1924 graduate of St. John's College High School in Washington, DC. He attained his B.A. in 1928 from Catholic University of America, and his LL.B. in 1931 from Harvard Law School in Cambridge, Massachusetts. He was a lawyer in private practice. He served as a Superior Court judge in San Juan from 1940 to 1945. He served as an associate justice of the Supreme Court of Puerto Rico from 1945 to 1946.

=== Resident Commissioner of Puerto Rico ===
Córdova was unexpectedly elected, as the New Progressive Party candidate for Resident Commissioner, for a four-year term (1969–1973) that spanned the Ninety-First and Ninety-Second Congress. His victory as gubernatorial candidate Luis A. Ferré's running mate, was unexpected since the Popular Democratic Party had ruled Puerto Rico for 28 consecutive years. Although a Republican, he initially sat with the congressional Democrats in caucus; he commenced caucusing with the Republican Party in the House in 1971. He was an unsuccessful candidate for reelection in 1972, and became a business executive.

=== Later career ===
Prior to Córdova's death, then-Senator Kenneth McClintock authored legislation, signed by Governor Pedro Rosselló, that created the Córdova Congressional Internship Program honoring Córdova Díaz and his father and Congressional predecessor, Félix Córdova Dávila. The program allows 40 college students to spend a semester-long internship in the United States Congress every year. Since its inception, over 600 students have participated in the program which is run by The Washington Center for Academic Internships and Scholarships and a joint committee of Puerto Rico's Legislative Assembly, chaired for many years by McClintock and currently chaired by senator Melinda Romero Donnelly.

=== Death ===
He died on September 16, 1994, at his home Guaynabo, Puerto Rico at the age of 87.

== See also ==
- List of Puerto Ricans
- List of Hispanic Americans in the United States Congress

== Sources ==
- United States Congress. "Jorge Luis Córdova (id: C000775)". Biographical Directory of the United States Congress.
- http://www.oslpr.org
- http://www.twc.org

U.S. House of Representatives
Preceded by Santiago Polanco Abreu	Resident Commissioner of Puerto Rico; 1969–1973	Succeeded by Jaime Benítez
Legal offices
Preceded by Martín Travieso	Associate Justice of the Puerto Rico Supreme Court; 1945–1946	Succeeded by Borinquen Marrero Ríos
