= Félix Córdova Dávila =

Puerto Rican politician (1878–1938)

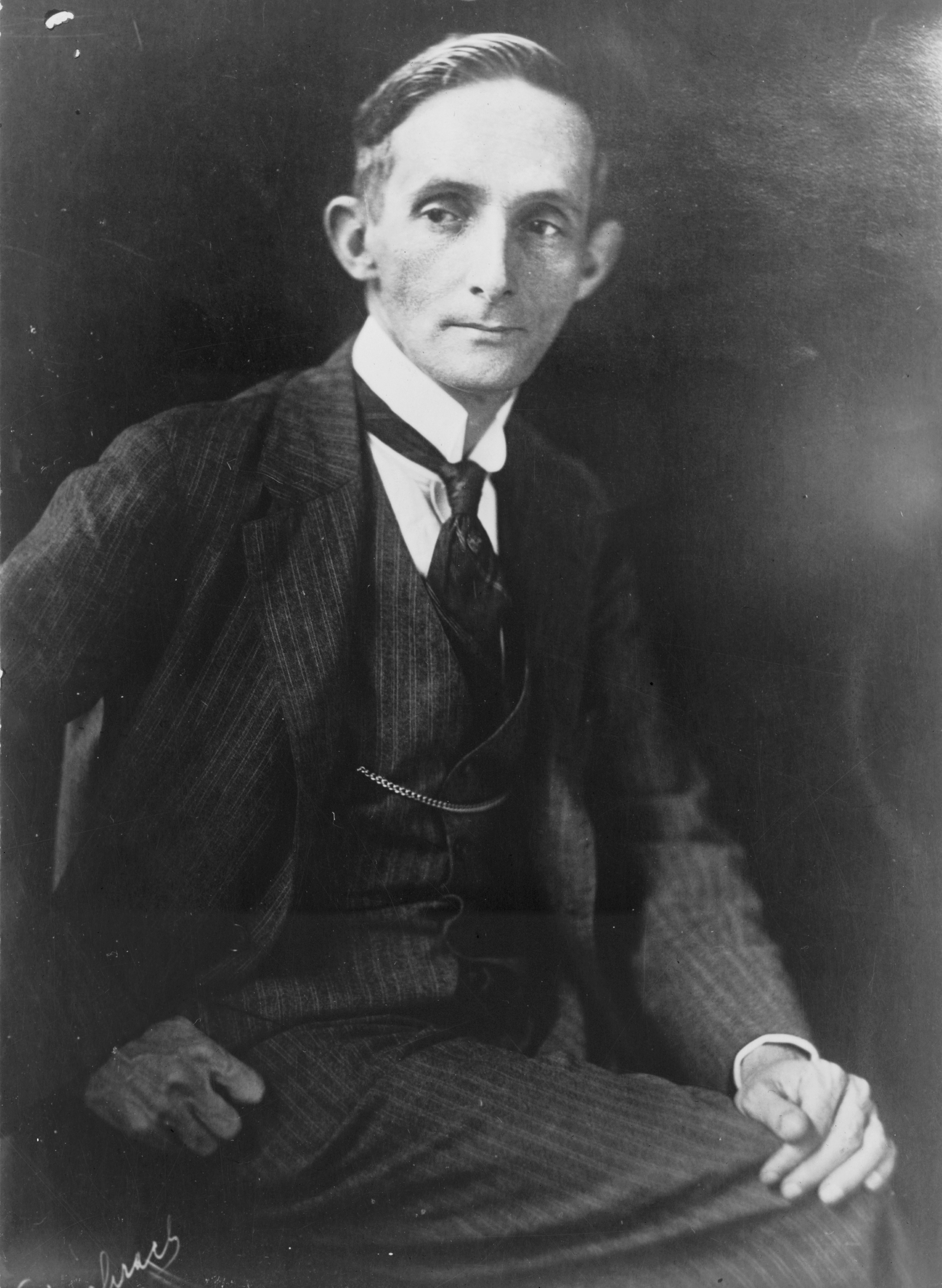

Resident Commissioner of Puerto Rico
- In office August 7, 1917 – April 11, 1932
- Preceded by: Luis Muñoz Rivera
- Succeeded by: José Lorenzo Pesquera

Associate Justice of the Supreme Court of Puerto Rico
- In office April 11, 1932 – March 31, 1938
- Appointed by: Herbert Hoover
- Preceded by: Jacinto Texidor y Alcalá del Olmo
- Succeeded by: Angel de Jesús Sánchez

Personal details
- Born: Félix Lope María Córdova Dávila; November 20, 1878 Vega Baja, Puerto Rico
- Died: December 3, 1938 (aged 60) San Juan, Puerto Rico
- Party: Unionist
- Spouse(s): Mercedes Díaz Collazo; Patria Martínez
- Children: Jorge
- Education: Howard University; National University School of Law (LLB)

Félix Lope María Córdova Dávila (November 20, 1878 – December 3, 1938) was a political leader and judge from Puerto Rico who served as Puerto Rico's fourth Resident Commissioner in Congress and later as an associate justice of the Supreme Court of Puerto Rico.

== Early years ==
Félix Córdova Dávila was born in Vega Baja, Puerto Rico. His parents, Lope Córdova y Thibault and María Concepción Dávila y Dávila, died while he was very young, and he was placed in the care of his cousin, Dr. Gonzalo María Córdova y Dávila in Jayuya. He began studies on his own based in the extensive library of his cousins Gonzalo and Ulpiano. During his adolescence, he attended the public schools in Manati while working at a drugstore owned by another cousin, Clemente Ramírez de Arellano Córdova. After the United States acquired Puerto Rico in 1898, Córdova Dávila, knowing very little English, decided to invest the earnings of a book of poetry that he produced to attend law school in Washington, D.C. Attracted by low tuition costs, he enrolled at Howard University Law School, not aware of it being a black college. Well treated by his fellow students, all black, he completed his first year there as the only white student, before transferring to National University Law School in Washington, D.C., now known as George Washington University Law School, where he obtained his Masters of Law. Before returning to Puerto Rico, he was denied a license to practice law in the District of Columbia because Puerto Ricans were not yet United States citizens. He successfully protested before the District Bar and was admitted to practice in the nation's capital. He was admitted to practice law in Puerto Rico in 1903.

In 1906, Córdova married Mercedes Díaz Collazo, with whom he had several children: Jorge Luis in 1907, who would succeed Córdova Dávila both as an Associate Justice in the Puerto Rico Supreme Court as well as in Congress (1969–1972), Félix Lope (1909), and Enrique (1913).

== Public office ==
Córdova Dávila then took on a succession of local offices in Puerto Rico. He was appointed by Governor William Hunt as judge of the municipal court of Caguas in 1904 and then served as judge of the municipal court of Manati from 1904 to 1908. He served as district attorney for Aguadilla in 1908, as judge of the district court of Guayama from 1908 to 1910; judge of the district court of Arecibo from 1910 to 1911; and judge of the district court of San Juan, Puerto Rico, from 1911 to 1917. (These courts were part of Puerto Rico's local court system, and should not be confused with the United States District Court.) On January 12, 1912, Córdova was one of nine attorneys and judges who founded Puerto Rico's first law school under US rule, operating out of the Ateneo Puertorriqueño, serving as its first Civil Code professor. This first school was eventually transformed into the University of Puerto Rico School of Law.

On July 16, 1917, Córdova Dávila was elected as the Union Party candidate to serve as Resident Commissioner from Puerto Rico to the United States, succeeding Luis Muñoz Rivera, who had died the preceding November and had recommended him as his successor. The duties of the Resident Commissioner included representing Puerto Rico as a non-voting delegate to the United States House of Representatives. Córdova Dávila was re-elected to four-year terms as Resident Commissioner in 1920, 1924, and 1928.

As he opened his congressional office, his predecessor's son, Luis Muñoz Marín, asked to be hired as his clerk. Feeling duty-bound to Muñoz Rivera, Córdova Dávila hired him immediately. In his memoirs, Puerto Rico's future first elected Governor wrote pleasantly about his two months working in Congress. The Resident Commissioner, on the other hand, wrote to his friend Epifanio Fernández Vanga, that Muñoz Marín "has natural talent but lacks the education to perform at this task...everything was disorganized...and my office's image was being affected".

== Trials and tribulations ==
In 1918, his wife and three children were infected with the influenza that American soldiers brought back from the battlefields in Europe. While his children recovered, his wife died in October of that year, and he married his second wife, Patria Martínez, in 1919, with whom he became estranged over time.

On April 11, 1932, Córdova Dávila resigned as Resident Commissioner after having been appointed by President Herbert Hoover as an associate justice of the Supreme Court of Puerto Rico. He held that office until March 31, 1938, when he retired from the court to rest and prepare for his death from prostate cancer on December 3, 1938.

Dr. Loretta Phelps de Córdova, the wife of one of Córdova Dávila's descendants, has published information concerning Córdova Dávila's service as Resident Commissioner. A series of Córdova Dávila's letters is being published under collaboration between Dr. Phelps de Córdova and the Official Historian of Puerto Rico, Dr. Luis González Vale.

== Death ==
He died on December 3, 1938, in San Juan, Puerto Rico at age 60.

== See also ==
- List of Puerto Ricans
- List of Hispanic Americans in the United States Congress

U.S. House of Representatives
Preceded by Luis Muñoz Rivera	Resident Commissioner of Puerto Rico; 1916–1932	Succeeded by José Lorenzo Pesquera
Legal offices
Preceded by Jacinto Texidor y Alcalá del Olmo	Associate Justice of the Puerto Rico Supreme Court; 1932–1938	Succeeded by Angel de Jesús Sánchez
