= Ángel Martín Taboas =

Puerto Rican judge (1918–2023)

Associate Justice of the Supreme Court of Puerto Rico
- In office 1971–1982
- Nominated by: Luis A. Ferré
- Preceded by: Carlos Santana Becerra
- Succeeded by: Francisco Rebollo López

Secretary of Treasury of Puerto Rico
- In office 1970–1971
- Nominated by: Luis A. Ferré
- Preceded by: Ángel M. Rivera
- Succeeded by: Wallace González Oliver

Personal details
- Born: June 18, 1918 Corozal, Puerto Rico
- Died: October 27, 2023 (aged 105)
- Resting place: Puerto Rico National Cemetery
- Education: Wharton School (BEc); Tulane University Law School (JD)

Military service
- Allegiance: United States of America
- Branch/service: United States Army
- Rank: Major

Ángel Menuel Martín Taboas (June 18, 1918 – October 27, 2023) was an Associate Justice of the Supreme Court of Puerto Rico, appointed by Governor Luis A. Ferré in 1971, after having served as Secretary of the Puerto Rico Department of the Treasury, or "Hacienda".

== Biography ==
Born in Corozal, Puerto Rico, Martín Taboas obtained a bachelor's degree in economics in 1939 and an MBA in 1940, both from the Wharton School of the University of Pennsylvania. After graduating from the Army ROTC he went in 1940 to active duty in the United States Army, and was sent to Fort Benning for advanced infantry officer school. He served as Military Aide to Governor Rexford Tugwell during World War II and actually lived in the Governor's Mansion, "La Fortaleza". After the war, he continued in government service and obtained his Juris Doctor degree in 1953 from the Tulane University Law School.

Martín Taboas served as Secretary of Treasury of Puerto Rico from 1970 until 1971.

Martín Taboas was appointed to the Supreme Court of Puerto Rico and served as an Associate Justice for eleven years until his retirement in 1982.

Married to the former Carmen Viola García, he was the father of University of Puerto Rico law professor and former Senator Fernando Martín, the Executive President of the Puerto Rican Independence Party (PIP).

Martín Taboas turned 100 in June 2018, and died on October 27, 2023, at the age of 105. He was buried at the Puerto Rico National Cemetery in Bayamón, Puerto Rico

== Sources ==
- La Justicia en sus Manos by Luis Rafael Rivera, ISBN 1-57581-884-1

Legal offices
Preceded by Carlos Santana Becerra	Associate Justice of the Puerto Rico Supreme Court; 1971–1982	Succeeded by Francisco Rebollo López
Political offices
Preceded by Ángel M. Rivera	Secretary of Treasury of Puerto Rico; 1970–1971	Succeeded by Wallace González Oliver
