= Borinquen Marrero Ríos =

Associate Justice of the Supreme Court of Puerto Rico
- In office 1947–1957
- Appointed by: Harry S. Truman
- Preceded by: Jorge Luis Córdova
- Succeeded by: Lino Saldaña Amadeo

Personal details
- Born: July 8, 1898 Naguabo, Puerto Rico
- Died: December 3, 1962 (aged 64) Madrid, Spain
- Education: Fordham University School of Law (JD)

Borinquen Alfredo Marrero Ríos (August 8, 1898 – December 3, 1962) was a Puerto Rican judge. He served for 10 years as an Associate Justice of the Supreme Court of Puerto Rico. Judge Borinquen Marrero Rios Born on August 5, 1899, in Naguabo, Puerto Rico, he obtained his bachelor's degree and law degrees at the Fordham University School of Law. While a law student, he worked as a Spanish and English language correspondent.

Worked in the legal private practice until 1947 when he was appointed to the Puerto Rican Supreme Court by President Harry S. Truman in 1947 until his retirement in 1957.

He died on 3 December 1962, in Madrid, Spain, at the age of 63.

== Sources ==
- La Justicia en sus Manos by Luis Rafael Rivera, ISBN 1-57581-884-1

Legal offices
Preceded by Jorge Luis Córdova	Associate Justice to the Supreme Court of Puerto Rico; 1947–1957	Succeeded by Lino Saldaña Amadeo
