= Erick Kolthoff =

Puerto Rican judge (born 1961)

Associate Justice of the Supreme Court of Puerto Rico
- Incumbent
- Assumed office February 4, 2009
- Appointed by: Luis Fortuño
- Preceded by: Francisco Rebollo López

Personal details
- Born: September 15, 1961 (age 64) San Juan, Puerto Rico
- Relatives: Erick Kolthoff-Benners (father)
- Education: Interamerican University of Puerto Rico (BBA, MCJ); University of Puerto Rico, Río Piedras (JD)

Erick Kolthoff-Caraballo (born September 15, 1961 in San Juan, Puerto Rico) is an associate justice of the Supreme Court of Puerto Rico.

Graduated from High School at Escuela Libre de Música in Hato Rey. He obtained a bachelor's degree in business administration from the Interamerican University of Puerto Rico, a Master of Criminal Justice (with Summa-laude qualification) from the same institution, and the Juris Doctor degree from the University of Puerto Rico School of Law, where he graduated in 1988.

Prior to being appointed on February 4, 2009 to the Supreme Court by Governor Luis Fortuño he had been appointed by former Governor Aníbal Acevedo Vilá as a Superior Court judge, for which he was unanimously confirmed by the Senate. Previously, he served as staff director of the Senate of Puerto Rico's Nominations Technical Evaluation Unit, as an attorney for the Courts Administration of Puerto Rico, the Puerto Rico Telecommunications Regulatory Board, and an attorney in private practice. He is the son of a former Superior Court judge, his namesake, appointed in 1969 by then Governor Luis A. Ferré.

He is the son of Erick Kolthoff-Benners, the first Afro-Puerto Rican member of the islands' judiciary.

== See also ==
- List of Afro-Latinos
- List of Hispanic and Latino American jurists
- List of Puerto Ricans
- German immigration to Puerto Rico

Legal offices
Preceded by Francisco Rebollo López	Associate Justice of the Supreme Court of Puerto Rico; 2009–present	Incumbent
