= A. Cecil Snyder =

American judge (1907–1959)

7th Chief justice of the Supreme Court of Puerto Rico
- In office 1953–1957
- Appointed by: Luis Muñoz Marín

Associate justice of the Supreme Court of Puerto Rico
- In office 1943–1953
- Appointed by: Franklin D. Roosevelt
- Preceded by: Adolph Grant Wolf
- Succeeded by: Emilio Belaval Maldonado

United States Attorney for the District of Puerto Rico
- In office 1933 – December 1941
- President: Franklin D. Roosevelt

Personal details
- Born: Aaron Cecil Snyder; September 14, 1907 Baltimore, Maryland, U.S.
- Died: June 29, 1959 (aged 51) San Juan, Puerto Rico
- Education: Baltimore City College; Johns Hopkins University; Harvard Law School

Aaron Cecil Snyder (September 14, 1907 – June 29, 1959) was an American lawyer who served as a prosecutor and judge in Puerto Rico.

== Early life ==
Snyder was born in Baltimore, Maryland. After attending Baltimore City College and Johns Hopkins University as an undergraduate, he graduated from Harvard Law School in 1930.

Snyder practiced law briefly in New York City and Baltimore. In 1933, Maryland Senator Millard Tydings, Chairman of the Senate Committee on Territories, arranged for Snyder's appointment as United States Attorney for the District of Puerto Rico. As U.S. Attorney, he prosecuted Puerto Rican independence activist Pedro Albizu Campos and defended then-Senate President Luis Muñoz Marín at U.S. Senate hearings on Muñoz's allegedly communist leanings.

== Supreme Court of Puerto Rico ==
In December 1941, President Franklin D. Roosevelt appointed Snyder as an Associate Justice of the Supreme Court of Puerto Rico, succeeding Adolph Grant Wolf. Snyder became the last non-Puerto Rican appointed to that court. As Associate Justice, he appeared before the United States House of Representatives' Committee on Public Lands in 1950 in support of a bill allowing Puerto Rico to draft a local constitution. The bill was passed, and Snyder contributed to the drafting and translation of the Constitution of Puerto Rico.

In 1953, Governor Luis Muñoz Marín, following a long-standing tradition of appointing the most senior Associate Justice as Chief Justice when a vacancy arose, appointed him Chief Justice of the Supreme Court of Puerto Rico, the first appointment that a Puerto Rican governor made to the court, addressing the nomination to "A. Cecilio Snyder". Snyder actually used the name "Cecilio" when sworn in as Chief Justice.

=== Resignation ===
Four years later, in July 1957, after most of Puerto Rico's legal establishment had lost confidence in Snyder's leadership as Chief Justice, he resigned from the court effective September 15, 1957. He was succeeded as Chief Justice by Associate Justice Jaime Sifre Dávila. After his departure from the court, Snyder practiced law in San Juan, Puerto Rico until his death on June 29, 1959. He was buried at Hebrew Young Men's Cemetery in Woodlawn, Maryland.

Preceded by Adolph Grant Wolf	Associate Justice to the Supreme Court of Puerto Rico; 1942–1953	Succeeded by Emilio Belaval Maldonado
Preceded by Roberto H. Todd	Chief Justice of Puerto Rico; 1953–1957	Succeeded by Jaime Sifre Dávila

== See also ==
- List of Puerto Ricans
- Jewish immigration to Puerto Rico

== Sources ==
- La Justicia en sus Manos, by Luis Rafael Rivera, 2007, ISBN 1-57581-884-1
