= Emilio Belaval Maldonado =

Puerto Rican judge (1903–1972)

Associate Justice of the Supreme Court of Puerto Rico
- In office 1953–1967
- Appointed by: Luis Muñoz Marín
- Preceded by: A. Cecil Snyder
- Succeeded by: Hiram Torres Rigual

Personal details
- Born: November 8, 1903 Fajardo, Puerto Rico
- Died: March 30, 1972 (aged 68) San Juan, Puerto Rico
- Education: University of Puerto Rico School of Law (JD)

Emilio Belaval Maldonado (November 8, 1903 – March 30, 1972) was a Puerto Rican lawyer who served as an associate justice of the Supreme Court of Puerto Rico from 1953 to 1967.

Belaval Maldonado was born in Fajardo, Puerto Rico, and graduated earning a Juris Doctor from the University of Puerto Rico School of Law in 1927. In the field of law, he was a district judge, and later, an associate justice of the Supreme Court appointed by Puerto Rico Governor Luis Muñoz Marín and Secretary of the Hayes Committee, who was in charge of the investigation of the events of the Ponce massacre.

From a young age, Belaval Maldonado felt a love for writing and his first verses appeared in a Puerto Rico illustrated magazine, when he was just 14 years old. Belaval Maldonado devoted himself to the cultivation of the tale, from their initial two books: El Libro Azul (1918) and Cuentos para Celegiales (1922). In his stories he reflects about the Puerto Rican social reality. He was also president of Ateneo Puertorriqueño a cultural institution.

Emilio Belaval Maldonado served 15 years in the Supreme Court of Puerto Rico until his retirement in 1967.

Belaval Maldonado died on March 30, 1972, at age 68 in San Juan, Puerto Rico.

Legal offices
Preceded by A. Cecil Snyder	Associate Justice of the Supreme Court of Puerto Rico; 1953-1967	Succeeded by Hiram Torres Rigual
