= Jorge Díaz Cruz =

American judge (1914–1998)

Associate Justice of the Supreme Court of Puerto Rico
- In office 1973 – May 16, 1984
- Appointed by: Rafael Hernández Colón
- Preceded by: Armindo Cadilla
- Succeeded by: Miriam Naveira

Personal details
- Born: September 15, 1914 Ponce, Puerto Rico
- Died: 1998 (aged 83)
- Relatives: Román Baldorioty de Castro (great-grandfather)
- Education: Central High School; University of Puerto Rico School of Law
- Occupation: Judge

Jorge Díaz Cruz (September 15, 1914 – 1998) served as Associate Justice of the Puerto Rico Supreme Court.

Cruz was born in Ponce, Puerto Rico to a family of well-known public figures. His great-grandfather was Román Baldorioty de Castro, the founder of Puerto Rico's autonomist movement, His grandfather was journalist and author Arístides Díaz y Díaz, and his father served as Superintendent of Public Education.

A 1930 graduate of Central High School in Santurce, Puerto Rico, he obtained his bachelor's degree as well as his law degree at the University of Puerto Rico School of Law. He practiced law in Yauco, Puerto Rico for 35 years, refusing the entreaties of Puerto Rico Senate Majority Leader Luis Negrón López and Governor Luis Muñoz Marín to accept appointments to public office. Finally, in 1973, he allowed his friend, Governor Rafael Hernández Colón to place his name in nomination for Associate Justice, a nomination strongly supported by the Governor's father, former Associate Justice Rafael Hernández Matos and by Negrón López. He served on the Court for 11 years, until his retirement on May 16, 1984.

Díaz Cruz died in 1998, at the age of 83.

== Sources ==
- La Justicia en sus Manos by Luis Rafael Rivera, ISBN 1-57581-884-1

Preceded by Armindo Cadilla	Associate Justice to the Supreme Court of Puerto Rico; 1973-1984	Succeeded by Miriam Naveira
