= Rafael Martínez Torres =

Puerto Rican judge (born 1959)

Associate Justice of the Supreme Court of Puerto Rico
- Incumbent
- Assumed office March 10, 2009
- Appointed by: Luis Fortuño
- Preceded by: Baltasar Corrada del Río

Personal details
- Born: February 14, 1959 (age 67) Humacao, Puerto Rico
- Education: University of Puerto Rico, Río Piedras (BA, JD)

Rafael Martínez Torres (born February 14, 1959) is a Puerto Rican jurist. Since 2009 he has served as an associate justice of the Supreme Court of Puerto Rico.

== Early life and education ==
Martínez was born in Humacao, Puerto Rico. Graduated in 1976 from Ana Roqué High School in Humacao with high honors. He received a bachelor's degree in political science from the University of Puerto Rico, Río Piedras Campus. Afterwards, he received a Juris Doctor degree from the University of Puerto Rico School of Law, where he served as editor of the Law Review. Martínez was also research assistant of José Julián Álvarez, a prominent Constitutional Law professor.

== Judicial career ==
After working in private practice and in the House of Representatives of Puerto Rico, Martínez in 1995 was appointed to the Puerto Rico Court of Appeals by Governor Pedro Rosselló. After spending 14 years in that Court, Governor Luis Fortuño elevated him to Associate Justice of the Supreme Court to fill the vacancy left by Justice Baltasar Corrada del Río. That seat had been vacant for over three years.

He was sworn in on March 10, 2009. The Constitution of Puerto Rico mandates that Supreme Court Justices must retire when they reach the age of seventy. Therefore, Justice Martínez term will expire in 2029.

== See also ==
- List of Hispanic and Latino American jurists

Legal offices
Preceded by Baltasar Corrada del Río	Associate Justice of the Supreme Court of Puerto Rico; 2009–present	Incumbent
