= Angel de Jesús Sánchez =

Puerto Rican jurist (1891–1951)

Chief Justice of the Supreme Court of Puerto Rico
- In office 1938–1948
- Nominated by: Harry S. Truman
- Preceded by: Martín Travieso
- Succeeded by: Roberto Todd Borrás

Associate Justice to the Supreme Court of Puerto Rico
- In office 1948–1951
- Nominated by: Harry S. Truman
- Preceded by: Harvey Hutchinson
- Succeeded by: Luis Negrón Fernández

Personal details
- Born: August 9, 1891 Ciales, Puerto Rico
- Died: April 30, 1951 (aged 59)
- Education: Cornell Law School (JD)

Angel de Jesús Sánchez (August 9, 1891 in Ciales, Puerto Rico – April 30, 1951) was a Puerto Rican jurist who served as the fifth chief justice of the Supreme Court of Puerto Rico from 1948 till 1951.

After graduating from the Central High School in Santurce, Puerto Rico in 1910 went to Cornell Law School in Ithaca, New York, to study the law. He started practicing as a lawyer in 1913. Was appointed municipal judge in Juana Díaz, Puerto Rico in 1915. Served also as municipal judge in Coamo, Puerto Rico and San Juan, Puerto Rico. After a few years in private practice. He was appointed to the United States bankruptcy court where he spent twelve years.

After serving as district judge in San Juan, Puerto Rico, Angel de Jesús Sánchez was nominated as Associate Justice of the Supreme Court of Puerto Rico in 1938 by president Harry S. Truman. In 1948 was appointed as the 5th Chief Justice of the Supreme Court of Puerto Rico also by president Truman. Held that position until his death on April 30, 1951, at age 59.

Legal offices
Preceded by Harvey Hutchinson	Associate Justice of the Puerto Rico Supreme Court; 1938–1948	Succeeded by Luis Negrón Fernández
Preceded by Martín Travieso	Chief Justice of the Puerto Rico Supreme Court; 1948–1951	Succeeded by Roberto Todd Borrás
