= Francisco Rebollo López =

American judge (1938–2025)

Associate Justice of the Supreme Court of Puerto Rico
- In office 1982–2008
- Appointed by: Carlos Romero Barceló
- Preceded by: Carlos Dávila Dávila
- Succeeded by: Erick Kolthoff

Personal details
- Born: August 5, 1938; San Juan, Puerto Rico
- Died: June 24, 2025 (aged 86)
- Education: University of Puerto Rico (BBA); University of Puerto Rico School of Law (JD)
- Occupation: Judge

Francisco Rebollo López (Spanish: [fɾanˈsisko reˈβoʎo ˈlopes]; August 5, 1938 – June 24, 2025) was a Puerto Rican jurist, who served as an Associate Justice on the Supreme Court of Puerto Rico from 1982 until his mandatory retirement in 2008.

== Life and career ==
Rebollo completed studies at the School of Commercial Administration from the University of Puerto Rico, graduating in 1959 and received his law degree from the University of Puerto Rico School of Law in 1963. He worked as a legal officer to the then associate justice of the Supreme Court of Puerto Rico, Pedro Pérez Pimentel. In August 1966, he was appointed assistant prosecutor of the Superior Court of Puerto Rico by the then governor of Puerto Rico, Roberto Sánchez Vilella. In 1973, was appointed superior judge by Governor Rafael Hernández Colón and went to serve in various courts of Puerto Rico. He went into private law practice until Governor Carlos Romero Barceló appointed him to the Supreme Court. He took the oath of office in July 1982 after ratification by the Senate of Puerto Rico. In the court, Justice Rebollo took a moderate path in his judicial opinions, often being the swing vote in court decisions.

Rebollo held the position of Interim Chief Justice of the Supreme Court of Puerto Rico during periods when the seat of Chief Justice has been vacant. He continued to serve as Associate Justice until his retirement in 2008.

He was affiliated with the New Progressive Party of Puerto Rico.

Rebollo died on June 24, 2025, at the age of 86. He was buried at Buxeda Memorial Park Cemetery in Río Piedras, Puerto Rico.

Legal offices
Preceded by Carlos Dávila Dávila	Associate Justice to the Supreme Court of Puerto Rico; 1982–2008	Succeeded by Erick Kolthoff
