= Arístides Maragliano =

Spanish-born Puerto Rican lawyer

Arístides Maragliano is referred to as the 'unknown Justice' since very little is known about this Spanish-born member of Puerto Rico's highest court under Spanish rule, the 'Audiencia Territorial'. He is also the only Spaniard who was appointed to the highest court under American rule.

== Background ==
Aristides Maragliano came to serve in high government positions for Spain and for the United States while residing in Puerto Rico.

In 1897 an autonomous regime was granted to Puerto Rico and a Parliament with two chambers was established. In May 1897, Aristides Maragliano was the magistrate in Mayagüez, Puerto Rico, a position he held under the crown of Spain.

The Spanish–American War, a conflict between Spain and the United States which lasted three months from April 21, 1898 – August 13, 1898 ended with the signing of the Treaty of Paris of 1898 and Puerto Rico was ceded to the United States. As a result of the United States invasion and the change in government in Puerto Rico, the social order and that of its institutions faced radical change. At that time, the composition of Puerto Rico's court was as follows: Venancio Zorrilla y Arredondo, President; Nicolás Lillo Rodas, President of the Chamber; Antonio Martínez Ruiz, José C. Hernández, Darío Olloa Varela, Arístides Maragliano and Francisco J. Vasco, Magistrates; Enrique Díaz Guijarro, Prosecutor; Indalecio Villaverde, Deputy Prosecutor; and Rafael Nieto Abeillé, Tax Attorney.

On October 20, 1898, while living in Puerto Rico, Maragliano and other high-level Spanish officials also residing in Puerto Rico renounced their allegiance to Spain and swore allegiance to the United States. For this Maragliano and the other officials were called "traitors" by a Spanish newspaper reporting the story.

It is believed that Maragliano was appointed on October 27, 1898, to the U.S. court as a magistrate, the same day that José Severo Quiñones and José Conrado Hernández were appointed.

On December 1, 1898, a Madrid newspaper announced that Maragliano and others who had held high-level positions for the Crown of Spain no longer worked for Spain because they had accepted positions with the United States government instead.

For unknown reasons, Maragliano resigned from his position on the court on March 17, 1899.
