= Carlos Dávila Dávila =

Puerto Rican judge (1914–2010)

Associate Justice of the Supreme Court of Puerto Rico
- In office 1961–1984
- Appointed by: Luis Muñoz Marín
- Preceded by: New seat due to expansion
- Succeeded by: Francisco Rebollo López

Director of the Puerto Rico Office of Legislative Services
- In office 1954–1961

Personal details
- Born: Carlos Victor Dávila Dávila; May 2, 1914 Bayamón, Puerto Rico
- Died: July 20, 2010 (aged 96) Guaynabo, Puerto Rico
- Education: University of Puerto Rico School of Law (LL.B.)
- Occupation: Lawyer, judge

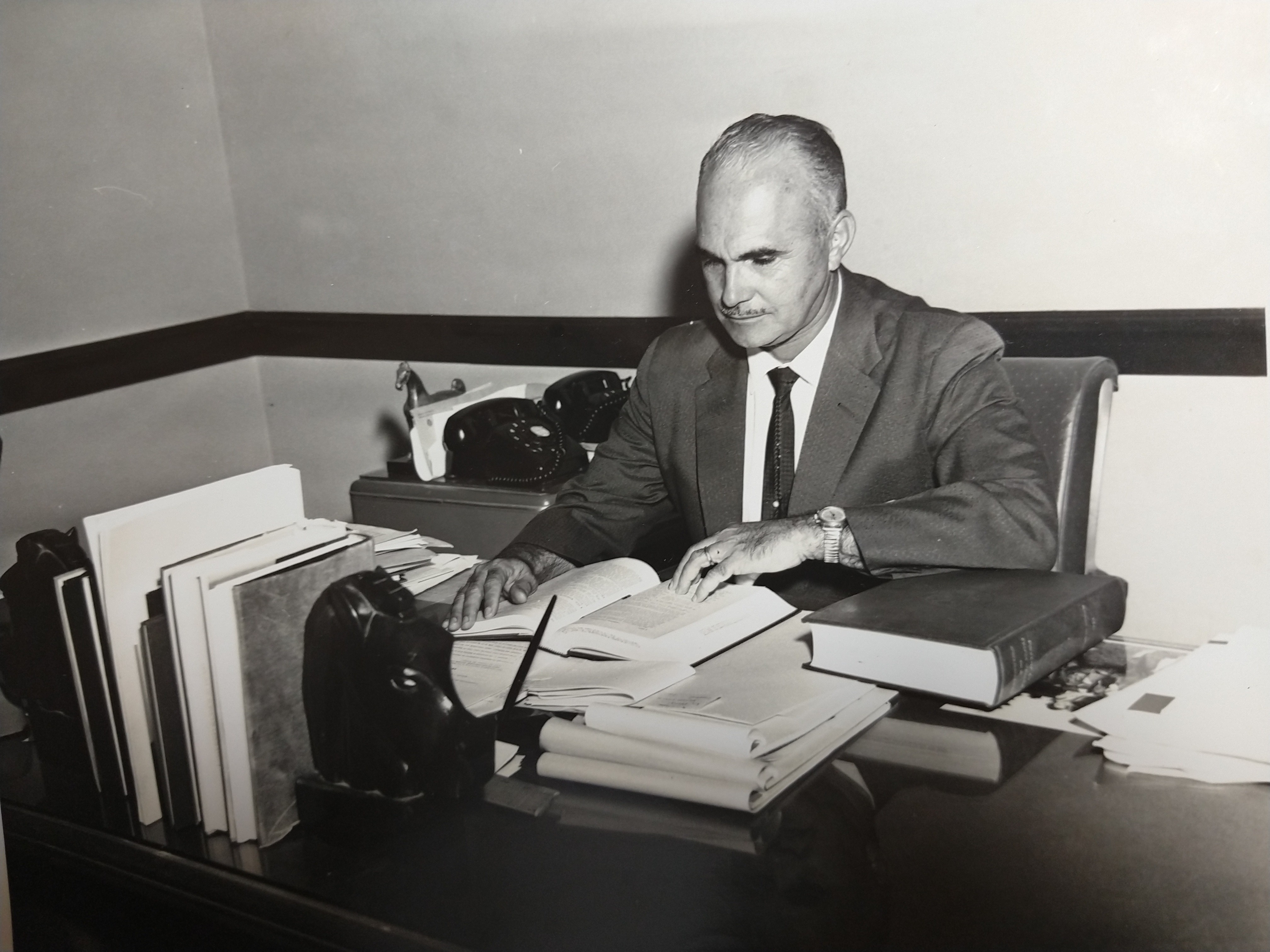
Justice Carlos Victor Dávila Dávila in his office.

Carlos Victor Dávila Dávila (May 2, 1914 – July 20, 2010) was the oldest living former Associate Justice of the Puerto Rico Supreme Court for many years until his death.

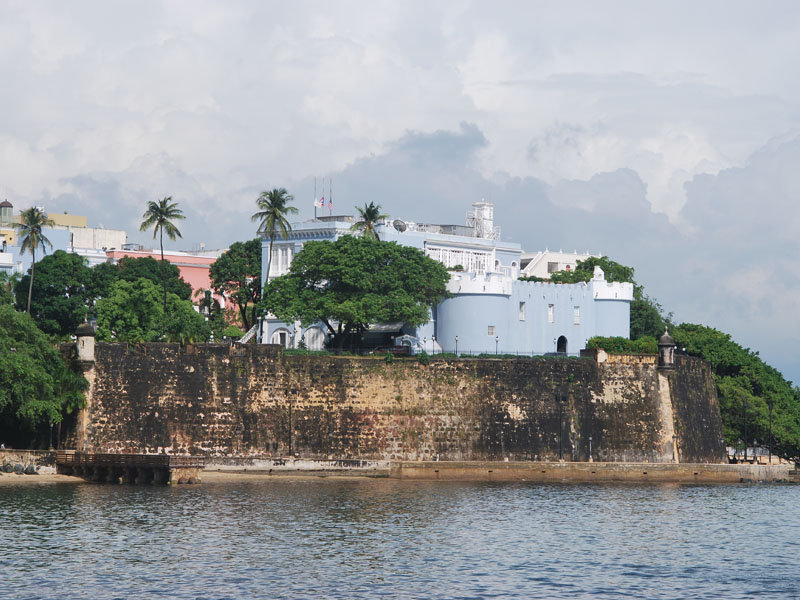
Flags on La Fortaleza flown at half-staff after Dávila's death

== Early life ==
He was born July 1914, Bayamón, Puerto Rico on La Palma street, near the house where Puerto Rico patriot José Celso Barbosa was born. After his father's [Sebastián Dávila] death when he was only seven years old, he was taken in by his uncle Virgilio Dávila, a well-known poet. Although initially interested in agronomy, he subsequently studied law at the University of Puerto Rico School of Law where he graduated and began practicing in his native Bayamón in the 1940s. After a brief stint at a law firm, he began working for one of the islands' most prominent attorneys, former Gov. James R. Beverly. After five years there, while arguing a case before the Supreme Court of Puerto Rico, he caught the eye of Justice Angel De Jesus, for whom he served as a law clerk until the judge's demise on April 30, 1951 when he suffered a massive heart attack in his chambers at the Capitol.

Dávila lived in barrio Frailes in Guaynabo, Puerto Rico.

== Career ==
Dávila served as served as Deputy Prosecutor of the Puerto Rico Department of Justice and an as advisor to the Puerto Rico Constitutional Assembly that drafted the islands' Constitution, was appointed Deputy Solicitor General by Governor Muñoz, he served as the first Director of the Office of Legislative Services of Puerto Rico between 1954 and 1961, appointed as such by Senate President Samuel R. Quiñones and House Speaker Ernesto Ramos Antonini, until he was appointed to the bench by Governor Luis Muñoz Marín on June 1, 1961, when the court expanded from 7 to 9 members. Served in the Puerto Rico Supreme Court until his retirement on April 30, 1984. He became close to Muñoz while helping draft the Popular Democratic Party platform for the 1956 general elections. He died on July 20, 2010, at age 96, in Guaynabo, Puerto Rico.

His son and namesake, Carlos Dávila Vélez is a former Superior Court judge, and his daughter, The Hon. María Adaljisa Dávila Vélez, currently serves as a Superior Court judge.

Legal offices
Preceded by New seat due to expansion	Associate Justice to the Supreme Court of Puerto Rico; 1961–1984	Succeeded by Francisco Rebollo López

== Sources ==
- "Office of Legislative Services - Senate of Puerto Rico - House of Representatives". oslpr.org. April 9, 2007. Archived from the original on April 9, 2007. (Senate of Puerto Rico - House of Representatives)
