= Hiram Torres Rigual =

Puerto Rican judge (1922–2006)

Associate Justice of the Supreme Court of Puerto Rico
- In office May 17, 1968 – January 31, 1985
- Appointed by: Roberto Sánchez Vilella
- Preceded by: Emilio Belaval Maldonado
- Succeeded by: Federico Hernández Denton

Personal details
- Born: July 16, 1922; Mayagüez, Puerto Rico
- Died: December 3, 2006 (aged 84); Miami, Florida, U.S.
- Education: University of Puerto Rico (BA); University of Puerto Rico School of Law (JD); Harvard Law School (LL.M)
- Occupation: Judge

Hiram Torres Rigual (July 16, 1922 – December 3, 2006) was born in Mayagüez, Puerto Rico. He completed his bachelor's degree in Political Science and History in 1946 with high honors and in 1949 he obtained his Juris Doctor from the University of Puerto Rico School of Law. He completed postgraduate studies at Harvard University, where he obtained a master's degree in public law in 1962. After serving as an Internal Revenue agent as well as an aide to Puerto Rico's Treasury Secretary, he studied law at the University of Puerto Rico while he worked summers as a professor of Political Science on the same campus. He clerked with Supreme Court of Puerto Rico Associate Justice Borinquen Marrero upon his law school graduation in 1949 and held other government posts including over 15 years as an aide to Governors Luis Muñoz Marín and Roberto Sánchez Vilella.

Sánchez Vilella appointed him a Superior Court judge in 1965, elevating him to the Supreme Court in 1968, where he served as an Associate Justice from May 17, 1968, until January 31, 1985, when he retired at the age of 62.

He died on December 3, 2006, at age 84 in Miami, Florida, and was honored with a state funeral at the Supreme Court attended by Governor Aníbal Acevedo Vilá, Senate President Kenneth McClintock, House Speaker José Aponte Hernández as well as the six members of the Supreme Court.

== Sources ==
- La Justicia en sus Manos by Luis Rafael Rivera, ISBN 1-57581-884-1

Legal offices
Preceded by Emilio Belaval Maldonado	Associate Justice of the Supreme Court of Puerto Rico; 1968-1985	Succeeded by Federico Hernández Denton
