= Adolph Grant Wolf =

Puerto Rican judge (1869–1947)

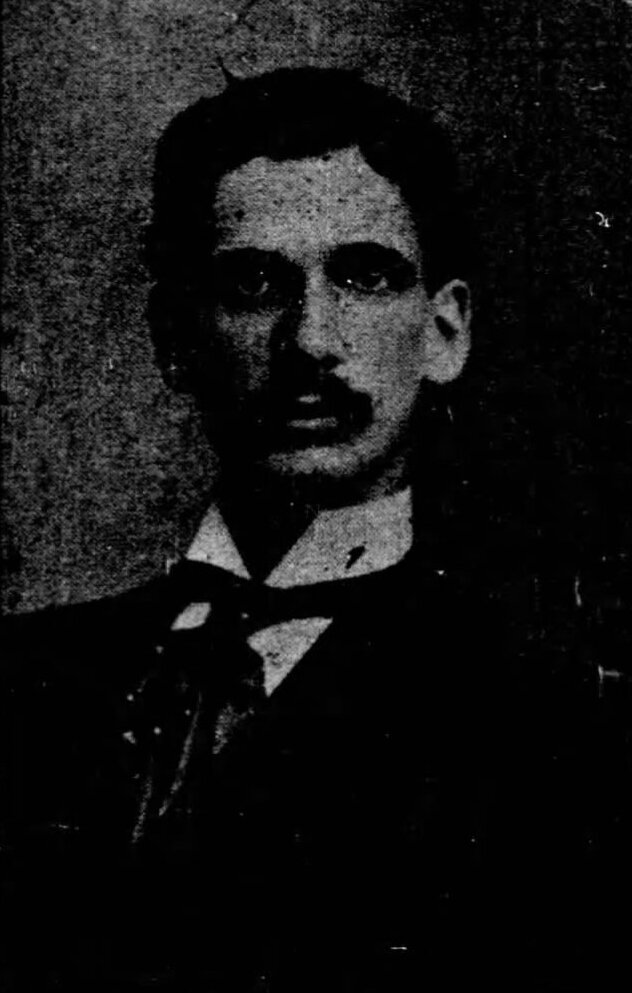
- Wolf in a 1904 newspaper

Associate justice of the Supreme Court of Puerto Rico
- In office May 4, 1904 – 1941
- Preceded by: Louis Sulzbacher
- Succeeded by: A. Cecil Snyder

Personal details
- Born: January 11, 1869 Washington, D.C., U.S.
- Died: November 3, 1947 (aged 78) Philadelphia, Pennsylvania, U.S.
- Spouse: Marian Sweet (m. 1914)
- Parent: Simon Wolf (father)
- Education: Johns Hopkins University (AB); University of Berlin; Columbian University (LLB, LLM)
- Occupation: Lawyer; judge

Adolph Grant Wolf (January 11, 1869 – November 3, 1947) was an American judge. Born in Washington, D.C., he served as a lawyer there from 1893 to 1904. He then served as associate justice of the Supreme Court of Puerto Rico from 1904 to his resignation in 1941. He also served as the Puerto Rican representative of the Uniform Law Commission from 1918 to 1930.

== Early life ==
Adolph Grant Wolf was born on January 11, 1869, in Washington, D.C., to Caroline (née Hahn) and Simon Wolf, consul general in Egypt. He was named for President Ulysses S. Grant. He was Jewish and Grant served as the kvater (godfather) of Wolf at his brit milah (circumcision). He attended public schools in Washington, D.C. He graduated with a Bachelor of Arts from Johns Hopkins University in 1889. He then studied law and philosophy at the University of Berlin from 1890 to 1891 and later graduated with a Bachelor of Laws in 1892 and Master of Laws in 1893 from the Columbian University. He was admitted to the bar in December 1893. He also received training in German, Spanish, and French languages.

== Career ==
In 1893, Wolf began to practice law in Washington, D.C. In 1896, he joined his father and Myer Cohen in Wolf & Cohen, a law firm representing fire insurance companies. He continued his practice until July 1904. He was a member of the Civil Service Reform League and served as treasurer and on the executive committee of its local Washington, D.C. branch. He was director of the District Title Insurance Company. He also served as financial secretary of the United Hebrew Charities of Washington, D.C.

On May 4, 1904, Wolf was appointed by President Theodore Roosevelt as an associate justice of the Supreme Court of Puerto Rico, succeeding Louis Sulzbacher. He retired in 1941 due to his eyesight. He was succeeded by A. Cecil Snyder. In 1910, Wolf described the people of Puerto Rico as "look[ing] upon the United States as a big brother" and appreciate the business advantage that annexation provided, but also noted the people's desire for home rule. He served as the Puerto Rico representative on the Uniform Law Commission from 1918 to 1930.

== Personal life ==
Wolf married Marian Sweet on August 5, 1914, in San Juan. He died of pneumonia on November 3, 1947, aged 78, in Philadelphia.

Legal offices
Preceded by Louis Sulzbacher	Associate Justice to the Supreme Court of Puerto Rico; 1904–1941	Succeeded by A. Cecil Snyder
