= Pedro Pérez Pimentel =

Puerto Rican judge and politician

Chief Justice of the Supreme Court of Puerto Rico
- In office 1973–1974
- Nominated by: Rafael Hernández Colón
- Preceded by: Luis Negrón Fernández
- Succeeded by: José Trías Monge

Associate Justice to the Supreme Court of Puerto Rico
- In office 1952–1972
- Nominated by: Luis Muñoz Marín
- Preceded by: New seat
- Succeeded by: Jorge Díaz Cruz

Personal details
- Born: April 11, 1904 Vieques, Puerto Rico
- Died: August 23, 1990 (aged 85)
- Education: University of Puerto Rico School of Law (JD)

Pedro Pérez Pimentel (April 11, 1904, in Vieques, Puerto Rico – August 23, 1990) served as an associate justice for the Puerto Rico Supreme Court and the tenth chief justice of the Supreme Court of Puerto Rico from 1972 until 1974.

Graduated in law from the University of Puerto Rico School of Law in 1927. Went to private practice and later as a legal advisor for the Puerto Rico Department of Treasury. Worked at district judge in Humacao, Guayama and San Juan. In 1952 Puerto Rico governor Luis Muñoz Marín appointed Pedro Pérez Pimentel as Associate Justice for the Puerto Rico Supreme Court. In 1972 was named acting Chief Justice and in 1973 was nominated as permanent Chief Justice by governor Rafael Hernández Colón. Served as Chief Justice until his retirement in 1974. He died on August 23, 1990, at age 85.

Legal offices
Preceded by New seat	Associate Justice of the Puerto Rico Supreme Court; 1952–1972	Succeeded by Jorge Díaz Cruz
Preceded by Luis Negrón Fernández	Chief Justice of the Puerto Rico Supreme Court; 1972–1974	Succeeded by José Trías Monge
