= Maite Oronoz Rodríguez =

Puerto Rican judge (born 1976)

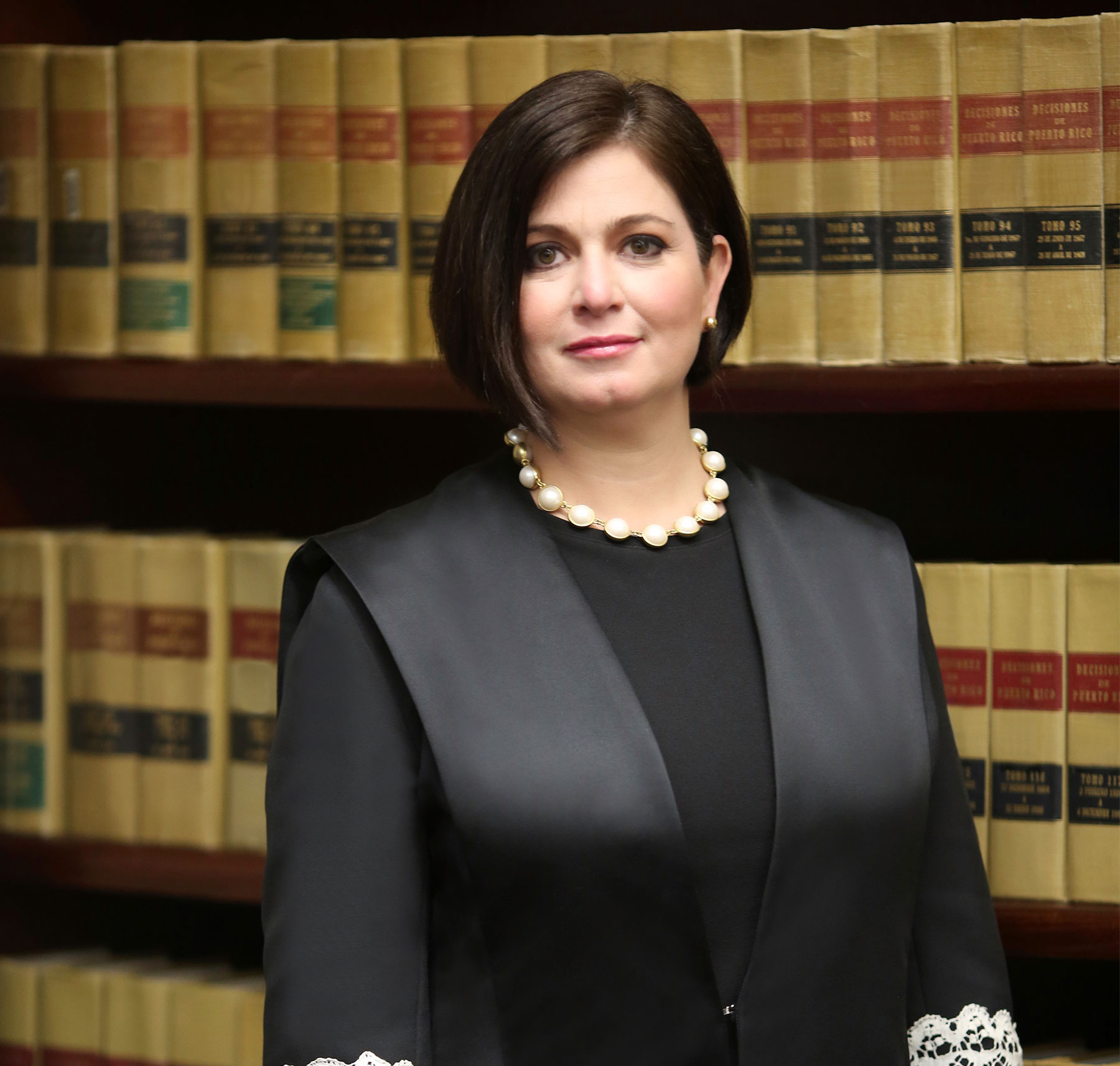

Chief Justice of the Puerto Rico Supreme Court
- Incumbent
- Assumed office February 22, 2016
- Appointed by: Alejandro García Padilla
- Preceded by: Liana Fiol Matta

Associate Justice of the Puerto Rico Supreme Court
- In office July 15, 2014 – February 22, 2016
- Appointed by: Alejandro García Padilla
- Preceded by: Liana Fiol Matta
- Succeeded by: Angel Colón-Pérez

Personal details
- Born: 1976 (age 49–50)
- Spouse: Gina R. Méndez-Miró
- Education: Villanova University (BA); University of Puerto Rico, Río Piedras (JD); Columbia University (LLM)

Maite Oronoz Rodríguez (born 1976) is a Puerto Rican jurist who serves as the 17th chief justice of the Supreme Court of Puerto Rico since 2016. Oronoz is Puerto Rico's first openly gay chief justice.

== Early years and education ==
Oronoz Rodríguez earned her bachelor's degree in history at Villanova University, cum laude, where she was a member of Phi Alpha Theta. Later, she studied law at the University of Puerto Rico School of Law, where she earned her Juris Doctor magna cum laude. She also earned a Master of Laws at Columbia University and has postgraduate studies in history from the University of Puerto Rico, and history and literature courses from the University of Florence, Italy. She was an editor of the University of Puerto Rico Law Review.

== Professional experience ==
Chief Justice Oronoz-Rodríguez began her professional career as a law clerk to former chief justice Federico Hernández-Denton, serving at the Supreme Court of Puerto Rico from 2002 to 2004. After earning an LL.M. at Columbia Law in New York, she served as deputy solicitor general and acting solicitor general of the Commonwealth of Puerto Rico from 2005 to 2008. She engaged in the private practice of the law from 2009 to 2013, especially in the fields of commercial and civil litigation in both state and federal courts. Before her appointment to the Supreme Court, she served as chief legal counsel of the city of San Juan, from 2013 to 2014.

== Supreme Court ==
=== Associate Justice ===
On June 4, 2014, Governor Alejandro García Padilla nominated Oronoz Rodríguez to the Supreme Court of Puerto Rico, following Associate Justice Liana Fiol Matta's nomination as chief justice. She was confirmed by the Senate on June 23, 2014. She was finally sworn in on July 15, 2014.

During her swearing in ceremony, Oronoz Rodríguez declared that her "commitment will always be with those who demand justice, regardless of race, color, gender, nationality, social origin or condition, sexual orientation or identity, or political or religious ideals."

=== Chief Justice ===
Following the retirement of Chief Justice Fiol Matta, Gov. García Padilla nominated Oronoz Rodríguez to replace her on February 12, 2016. Three former Chief Justices expressed their support for Oronoz Rodríguez's nomination: José Andreu García, Hernández Denton, and Fiol Matta. After being confirmed by the Senate of Puerto Rico on February 22, 2016, she was sworn in as chief justice the same day.

Oronoz Rodríguez was a member of the Board of Directors of the Conference of Chief Justices from 2021 to 2022 and participates in the Court Management and Public Engagement, Trust and Confidence Committee of this organization. She is also a collaborator of the Fairness and Awareness Work Group of the Blueprint for Racial Justice to address issues central to the justice system. In 2021, together with U.S. Supreme Court Justice Sonia Sotomayor, she addressed over 157 judges from Latin America as part of a United States Department of Justice training program for the judiciaries of the Western Hemisphere.

In 2018 she received the “LLSA IMPACTO Award” in recognition for her leadership, commitment to public service and justice for all. She was awarded the National Center for State Courts’ 2018 Distinguished Service Award for her leadership overseeing the restoration of court services following hurricanes Irma and Maria.

In 2021, she became the first woman to chair the Senate and Representative Congressional Districts Constitutional Review Board. In 2022, she assumed the Pro Tempore Presidency of the Central American and Caribbean Judicial Council.

== Personal life ==
Oronoz Rodríguez is married to Gina R. Méndez-Miró, judge of the United States District Court for the District of Puerto Rico. Together they are the mothers of twins, a boy and a girl. In 2018, she became the first Chief Justice of the Supreme Court of Puerto Rico to give birth while in office. In October 2021, she announced she was being treated for breast cancer.

== See also ==
- List of Hispanic and Latino American jurists
- List of LGBT jurists in the United States

Legal offices
Preceded by Liana Fiol Matta	Associate Justice of the Puerto Rico Supreme Court; 2014–2016	Succeeded by Angel Colón-Pérez
Preceded by Liana Fiol Matta	Chief Justice of the Puerto Rico Supreme Court; 2016–present	Incumbent
