= José Trías Monge =

Chief Justice of the Supreme Court of Puerto Rico

Chief Justice of the Supreme Court of Puerto Rico
- In office 1974–1985
- Nominated by: Rafael Hernández Colón
- Preceded by: Pedro Pérez Pimentel
- Succeeded by: Víctor Pons

Secretary of Justice of Puerto Rico
- In office 1953–1957
- Nominated by: Luis Muñoz Marín
- Preceded by: Víctor Gutiérrez Franqui
- Succeeded by: Rafael Hernandez Colon

Personal details
- Born: May 5, 1920 San Juan, Puerto Rico
- Died: June 24, 2003 (aged 83) Boston, Massachusetts
- Education: University of Puerto Rico (BA); Harvard University (MA); Harvard Law School (JD); Yale Law School (SJD)

José Trías Monge (May 5, 1920 – June 24, 2003) was a lawyer and judge in Puerto Rico. He served as the 11th chief justice of the Supreme Court of Puerto Rico from 1974 to 1985.

Born in San Juan, Puerto Rico, he was appointed Chief Justice in 1974, without any prior court service, by Gov. Rafael Hernández Colón, who, as President of the Senate of Puerto Rico between 1969 and 1972, had espoused that Chief Justices should be selected from among current Associate Justices.

In 1940, he graduated with a Bachelor of Arts degree from the University of Puerto Rico and, in 1943, obtained a master of Arts degree from Harvard University. The following year, he graduated with a Juris Doctor degree, also from Harvard Law School. In 1947, he completed doctoral studies in law at Yale Law School. From 1947 to 1949, he was a professor at the University of Puerto Rico.

Prior to his service as Chief Justice, Trías Monge was one of the top delegates to Puerto Rico's Constitutional Assembly between 1951 and 1952. Along with Muñoz Marín and Dr. Antonio Fernós Isern, he is considered one of the chief architects of the Commonwealth of Puerto Rico's Constitution. He then served as deputy Secretary of Justice of Puerto Rico under Gov. Luis Muñoz Marín from 1949 to 1953 and as Secretary of Justice from 1953 to 1957.

As Chief Justice, he chaired the 1980 Constitutional Board for Electoral Reapportionment. He held the office of Chief Justice until his retirement on October 20, 1985. Trias Monge is the author of several books on the judicial history and political status of Puerto Rico, in both Spanish and English. Several years prior to his death, despite his own contribution to the drafting and approval of the 1952 Commonwealth Constitution, he began writing and speaking publicly that Puerto Rico remained a territory or colony of the United States. He died June 24, 2003, in Boston, Massachusetts at age 83.

== Selected publications ==
- Puerto Rico: The Trials of the Oldest Colony in the World, by José Trías Monge (New Haven: Yale University Press, 1997).
- La Justicia en sus Manos, by Luis Rafael Rivera, 2007, ISBN 1-57581-884-1

== See also ==
- Attorney General of Puerto Rico
- List of Puerto Ricans

Legal offices
Preceded by Pedro Pérez Pimentel	Chief Justice of the Supreme Court of Puerto Rico; 1974–1985	Succeeded by Víctor Pons Nunez
Preceded by Víctor Gutiérrez Franqui	Secretary of Justice of Puerto Rico; 1953–1957	Succeeded by Rafael Hernandez Colon
