= Luis Negrón Fernández =

Puerto Rican jurist

Chief Justice of the Supreme Court of Puerto Rico
- In office 1957–1972
- Nominated by: Luis Muñoz Marín
- Preceded by: Jaime Sifre Dávila
- Succeeded by: Pedro Pérez Pimentel

Associate Justice to the Supreme Court of Puerto Rico
- In office 1948–1957
- Nominated by: Harry S. Truman
- Preceded by: Roberto Todd Borrás
- Succeeded by: Raúl Serrano Geyls

Personal details
- Born: April 29, 1910 Cataño, Puerto Rico
- Died: December 1, 1986 (aged 76) Rio Piedras, Puerto Rico
- Education: University of Puerto Rico School of Law (JD)

Luis Felipe Negrón Fernández (April 29, 1910 - December 1, 1986) was a Puerto Rican jurist who served as an associate justice of the Supreme Court of Puerto Rico and later as the ninth chief justice of the Supreme Court of Puerto Rico from 1971 till 1972.

He was born in Cataño, Puerto Rico on April 29, 1910. In 1934 he graduated in Law from the University of Puerto Rico School of Law and soon after devoted himself to public service. He was head of the Legal Division of the State Insurance Fund (1935–38), District Attorney in Humacao (1938–40), Assistant Prosecutor of the Supreme Court of Puerto Rico (1940–45) and Attorney General of Puerto Rico (1947–48). In 1948 President Harry S. Truman appointed him Associate Judge of the Supreme Court of Puerto Rico and in 1957 he became position of Chief Justice, appointed by Governor Luis Muñoz Marín. Soon after his retirement in 1971, he was appointed for the second time to hold the position of Chief Justice by governor Luis A. Ferre; occupied it until 1972 when he resigned the position.

Luis Negrón Fernández died December 1, 1986, in Río Piedras, Puerto Rico, at age 76.

His son Antonio Negrón García also served Associate Judge of the Supreme Court of Puerto Rico from 1974 to 2000.

== Sources ==
- La Justicia en sus Manos by Luis Rafael Rivera, ISBN 1-57581-884-1

Legal offices
Preceded by Roberto Todd Borrás	Associate Justice of the Puerto Rico Supreme Court; 1948-1957	Succeeded by Raúl Serrano Geyls
Preceded by Jaime Sifre Dávila	Chief Justice of the Puerto Rico Supreme Court; 1957–1972	Succeeded by Pedro Pérez Pimentel
Preceded by Jesús A. González (Acting)	Attorney General of Puerto Rico (Acting); 1945	Succeeded by Enrique Campos del Toro
Preceded by Enrique Campos del Toro	Attorney General of Puerto Rico; 1947-1948	Succeeded by Vicente Geigel Polanco
