= Chief Justice of the Supreme Court of Puerto Rico =

Presiding officer of the Supreme Court of Puerto Rico

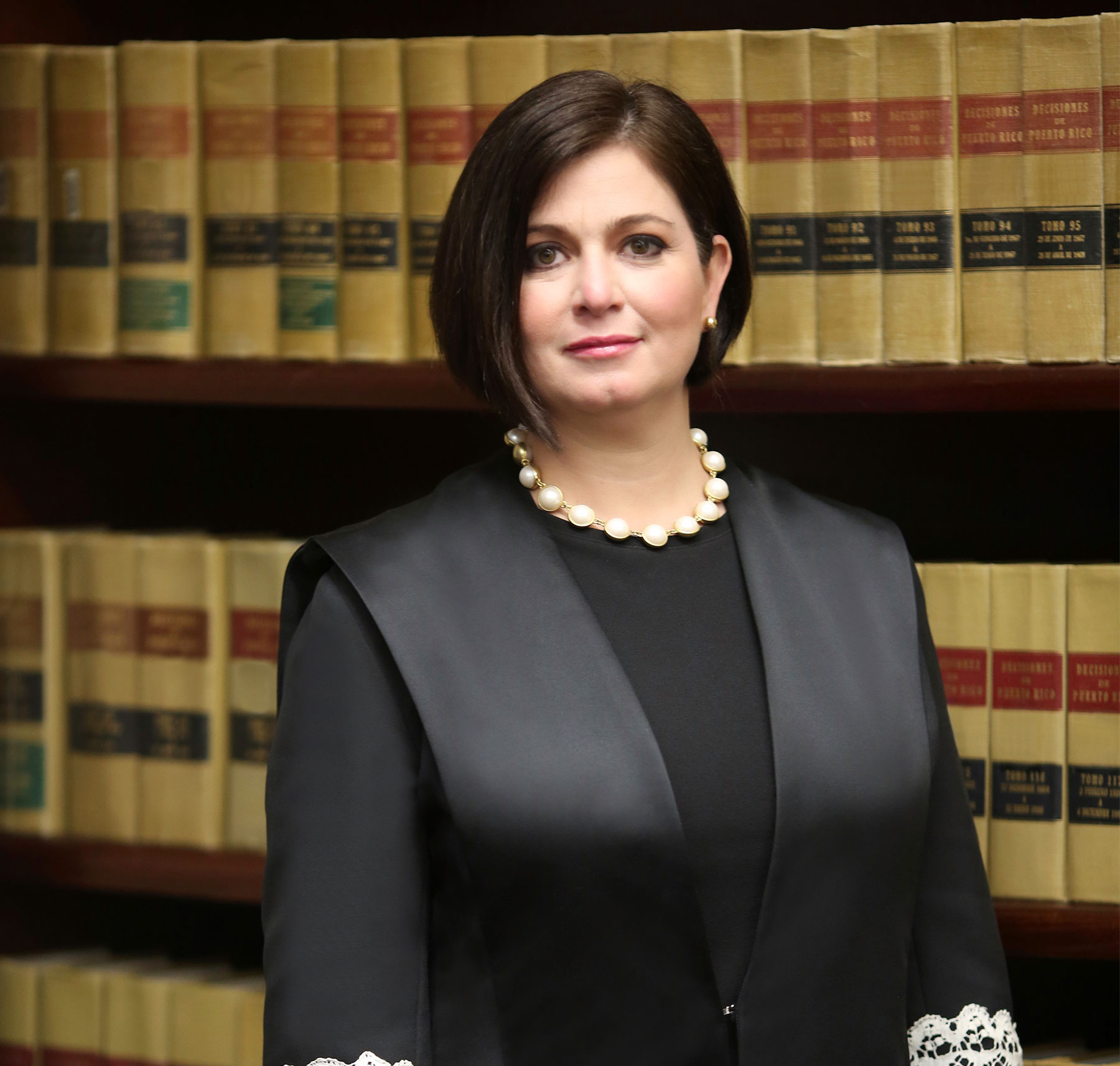
- Incumbent; Maite Oronoz Rodríguez since February 22, 2016
- Style: The Honorable diplomatic Madam President when presiding over the court
- Nominator: governor of Puerto Rico
- Appointer: governor of Puerto Rico with the advice and consent of the Senate
- Term length: until 70 years of age
- Inaugural holder: José Severo Quiñones
- Formation: Foraker Act; Article V of the Constitution of Puerto Rico

The chief justice of the Supreme Court of Puerto Rico (Spanish: Jefe del Tribunal Supremo de Puerto Rico) is the presiding officer of the Supreme Court of Puerto Rico. The post of chief justice was created by Article V of the Constitution of Puerto Rico. The constitution also established in several articles that the chief justice must:

- direct the administration of the courts,
- appoint an administrative director,
- chairman the board which revises Puerto Rico's senatorial and representative districts, and
- preside at the impeachment trial of the Governor of Puerto Rico.

The chief justice is also typically the judge that swears in the governor upon his inaugural term.

== Chief Justices ==
#	Portrait	Name	Took office	Left office	Appointed by	Other posts held
1		José Severo Quiñones	1900	1909	William McKinley	
2		José Hernández Santiago	1909	1922	William H. Taft	
3		Emilio del Toro Cuebas	1922	1943	Warren G. Harding	Associate Justice of the Supreme Court of Puerto Rico
4		Martín Travieso Nieva	1944	1948	Franklin D. Roosevelt	Senator of Puerto Rico; Associate Justice of the Supreme Court of Puerto Rico
5		Angel de Jesús Sánchez	1948	1951	Harry S. Truman	Associate Justice of the Supreme Court of Puerto Rico
6		Roberto Todd Borrás	1951	1952	Harry S. Truman	Deputy Solicitor General; Associate Justice of the Supreme Court of Puerto Rico
7		A. Cecil Snyder	1953	1957	Luis Muñoz Marín	United States Attorney; Associate Justice of the Supreme Court of Puerto Rico
8		Jaime Sifre Dávila	1957	1957	Luis Muñoz Marín	Associate Justice of the Supreme Court of Puerto Rico
9		Luis Negrón Fernández	1957	1972	Luis Muñoz Marín	Solicitor General; Associate Justice of the Supreme Court of Puerto Rico
10		Pedro Pérez Pimentel	1973	1974	Rafael Hernández Colón	District Judge; Associate Justice of the Supreme Court of Puerto Rico
11		José Trías Monge	1974	1985	Rafael Hernández Colón	Secretary of Justice
12		Víctor Pons Núñez	1985	1992	Rafael Hernández Colón	Secretary of State
13		José Andréu García	1992	2003	Rafael Hernández Colón	District Attorney; Superior Court Judge; Associate Justice of the Supreme Court of Puerto Rico
14		Miriam Naveira Merly	2003	2004	Sila María Calderón	Solicitor General; Associate Justice of the Supreme Court of Puerto Rico
15		Federico Hernández Denton	2004	2014	Sila María Calderón	Secretary of Consumer Affairs; Associate Justice of the Supreme Court of Puerto Rico
16		Liana Fiol Matta	2014	2016	Alejandro García Padilla	Administrator, Puerto Rico Court of Appeals; Associate Justice of the Supreme Court of Puerto Rico
17		Maite Oronoz Rodríguez	2016	present	Alejandro García Padilla	Associate Justice of the Supreme Court of Puerto Rico
