= Rafael Nieto Abeillé =

Puerto Rican judge

Rafael Nieto Abeillé, born in Cuba and educated in Spain, while serving as a prosecutor in Matanzas, Cuba, was appointed in 1896 as a trial judge in San Juan, Puerto Rico. Months later, he was appointed as a prosecutor before Puerto Rico's highest appellate court before being appointed as a magistrate on the court in 1898.

In July 1899, under United States rule, military governor Davis appointed him as Puerto Rico's Attorney General, a post that he held until April 1900. A speaker of the English language, he helped improve communications between Davis and the legal profession. After the 1900 Foraker Act went into effect, President William McKinley on June 5 appointed him as Associate Justice of the new Supreme Court of Puerto Rico. However, he resigned nine months later, on February 26, 1901, to return to his native Cuba to serve in that country's court system until his death on January 10, 1916.

== Sources ==
- Rivera, Luis Rafael Rivera (2007) La Justicia en sus Manos: historia del Tribunal Supremo de Puerto Rico Fundación Histórica del Tribunal Supremo de Puerto Rico (Historical Foundation for the Supreme Court of Puerto Rico), San Juan, Puerto Rico, ISBN 1-57581-884-1, in Spanish
