= Mildred Pabón =

Puerto Rican judge (born 1957)

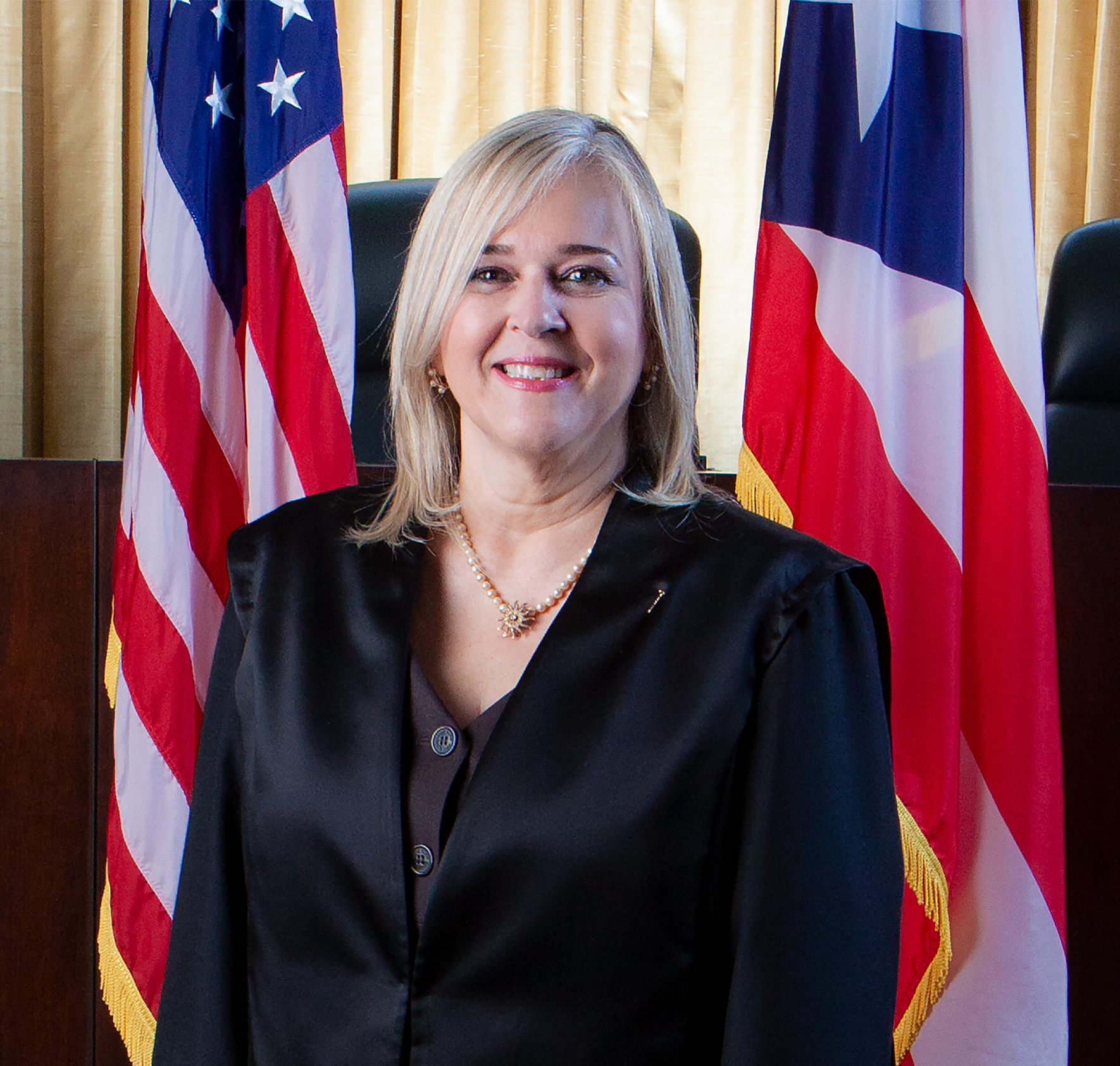

Associate Justice of the Supreme Court of Puerto Rico
- Incumbent
- Assumed office 2009
- Appointed by: Luis Fortuño
- Preceded by: Jaime Fuster

Personal details
- Born: November 27, 1957 (age 68) San Juan, Puerto Rico
- Education: University of Puerto Rico, Río Piedras (BS, JD)

Mildred Gail Pabón Charneco (born November 27, 1957) is a Puerto Rican judge serving as an associate justice of the Supreme Court of Puerto Rico. She was appointed by Governor Luis Fortuño on February 4, 2009. She graduated from the University of Puerto Rico, where she obtained a Bachelor of Science degree with the highest honors. In 1983, she earned her Juris Doctor from the University of Puerto Rico School of Law. She filled the vacancy created by the death of Associate Justice Jaime Fuster in 2007. Pabón is the fourth woman to serve on the Supreme Court of Puerto Rico. Justice Pabón term will expire on November 27, 2027.

Prior to serving as associate justice, Judge Pabón Charneco started her professional career in 1987 at the Troncoso-Fuentes Agostini Firm. Four years later, she was appointed Director of the Legal Division of that office. Pabón served for over nine years as a judge at the Puerto Rico Circuit Court of Appeals and as legislative counsel to Governor Pedro Rosselló. Prior to that, Pabón worked as a staff attorney at the Office of Legislative Services of Puerto Rico and in private practice.

== See also ==
- List of Hispanic and Latino American jurists

Legal offices
Preceded by Jaime Fuster	Associate Justice of the Supreme Court of Puerto Rico; 2009–present	Incumbent
