= Raúl Serrano Geyls =

Puerto Rican jurist and legal scholar (1921–2011)

Associate Justice of the Supreme Court of Puerto Rico
- In office December 10, 1957 – 1962
- Governor: Luis Muñoz Marín

Personal details
- Born: May 6, 1921 Arecibo, Puerto Rico
- Died: August 2, 2011 (aged 90) Rio Piedras, Puerto Rico
- Education: University of Puerto Rico (B.A., LL.B.); Columbia University (LL.M.); Harvard Kennedy School (M.P.A.)
- Profession: Jurist, legal scholar, professor, author

Raúl Serrano Geyls (May 6, 1921 – August 2, 2011) was a Puerto Rican jurist, constitutional law scholar, and legal educator. He served as an Associate Justice of the Supreme Court of Puerto Rico from 1957 to 1962 and authored influential treatises on Puerto Rican constitutional and family law.

== Early life and education ==
Serrano Geyls was born in Arecibo, Puerto Rico, in 1921. He enrolled at the University of Puerto Rico, initially studying to become a Spanish teacher before developing an interest in Hispanic American literature under professor Concha Meléndez and earning a Bachelor of Arts degree in 1941. He subsequently studied at the University of Puerto Rico School of Law, where he worked as an assistant to civil law scholar Luis Muñoz Morales and earned his Bachelor of Laws (LL.B.) in 1944.

Following his graduation from law school, Serrano Geyls pursued graduate studies in the mainland United States. He earned a Master of Laws (LL.M.) from Columbia Law School (Class of 1946) and a Master of Public Administration (M.P.A.) from Harvard University in 1945.

== Legal, public service, and judicial career ==
Returning to Puerto Rico in the late 1940s, Serrano Geyls combined legal practice with public service and university teaching. Beginning in 1947, he served on the Puerto Rico Labor Relations Board (Junta de Relaciones del Trabajo), a post he held until his appointment to the bench in 1957. In 1949, he joined the faculty of the School of Public Administration within the Faculty of Social Sciences at the University of Puerto Rico, while also maintaining a limited law and notarial practice during the late 1940s and 1950s.

During the Constitutional Convention of Puerto Rico (1951–1952), Serrano Geyls served as an advisor to the Committee on the Legislative Branch, helping prepare foundational research reports used in drafting the Constitution of Puerto Rico. He also served as a member of the Puerto Rico Civil Rights Commission.

On December 10, 1957, Governor Luis Muñoz Marín appointed Serrano Geyls as an Associate Justice of the Supreme Court of Puerto Rico. During his tenure on the court, he authored notable opinions on constitutional law and judicial ethics, including his writing in E.L.A. v. Aguayo. He resigned from the Supreme Court in 1962 to return full-time to legal academia.

== Academic career and political views ==
After his resignation from the Supreme Court in 1962, Serrano Geyls joined the faculty of the University of Puerto Rico School of Law, where he taught constitutional law and family law until his retirement from the university in 1979. He subsequently served on the faculty of the Interamerican University of Puerto Rico School of Law from 1979 to 1999, and also taught as a visiting professor at the Pontifical Catholic University of Puerto Rico School of Law.

== Death ==
Raúl Serrano Geyls died on August 2, 2011, he was 90 years old.

== Selected works ==
- Derecho Constitucional de Estados Unidos y Puerto Rico (2 volumes, Colegio de Abogados de Puerto Rico) ISBN 978-0940961012
- Derecho de Familia de Puerto Rico y Legislación Comparada
