= Carlos Irizarry Yunqué =

Puerto Rico jurist (1922–2015)

Associate Justice of the Supreme Court of Puerto Rico
- In office 1973–1985
- Appointed by: Rafael Hernández Colón
- Succeeded by: Miriam Naveira

Personal details
- Born: Carlos Juan Irizarry Yunqué; June 24, 1922 Sabana Grande, Puerto Rico
- Died: May 23, 2015 (aged 92) San Juan, Puerto Rico
- Education: University of Puerto Rico; University of Puerto Rico School of Law (JD)
- Profession: Judge

Military service
- Allegiance: United States
- Branch/service: United States Army
- Years of service: 1943–1946
- Rank: Second lieutenant

Carlos Juan Irizarry Yunqué (June 24, 1922 – May 23, 2015) was an associate justice of the Supreme Court of Puerto Rico. Appointed by Gov. Rafael Hernandez Colon in 1973 he was succeeded in 1985 by the Court's first female Associate Justice, Miriam Naveira.

Born on June 24, 1922, in Sabana Grande, Puerto Rico, he obtained his bachelor's degree at the University of Puerto Rico in 1943. Later he earned a juris doctor from the University of Puerto Rico School of Law in 1949. While in the University of Puerto Rico he joined Phi Sigma Alpha fraternity. Served in the United States Army between 1943 and 1946, earned the rank of Second Lieutenant in Fort Benning, Georgia. In 1950, he began working as an assistant prosecutor in Ponce, Puerto Rico a position he held for three years. He spent eight years in public service until 1957, when he entered private practice in Ponce, Puerto Rico. From 1968 to 1973 he taught at the Pontifical Catholic University of Puerto Rico School of Law in Ponce before being appointed to the Court in 1973.

Justice Irizarry, who served 12 years on the court until his retirement in 1985, was a distinguished professor at the Interamerican University of Puerto Rico School of Law and regularly attended court activities. Judge Irizarry died in his home on May 23, 2015, in San Juan, Puerto Rico. He was 92 years old.

== Sources ==
La Justicia en sus Manos by Luis Rafael Rivera, ISBN 1-57581-884-1

Legal offices
Preceded by	Associate Justice of the Supreme Court of Puerto Rico; 1973–1985	Succeeded by Miriam Naveira
