= Federico Hernández Denton =

15th Chief Justice of the Supreme Court of Puerto Rico

15th Chief Justice of the Supreme Court of Puerto Rico
- In office August 9, 2004 – April 12, 2014
- Nominated by: Sila María Calderón
- Preceded by: Miriam Naveira
- Succeeded by: Liana Fiol Matta

Associate Justice to the Supreme Court of Puerto Rico
- In office 1985–2004
- Nominated by: Rafael Hernández Colón
- Preceded by: Hiram Torres Rigual
- Succeeded by: Anabelle Rodriguez

Secretary of Consumer Affairs of Puerto Rico
- In office 1973–1977
- Governor: Rafael Hernández Colón

Personal details
- Born: April 12, 1944 (age 82) Santurce, Puerto Rico
- Education: Harvard University (BA, LLM)

Federico Hernández Denton (born April 12, 1944) was the 15th chief justice of the Supreme Court of Puerto Rico.

== Biography ==
Hernández Denton received a Bachelor of Arts from Harvard College in 1966 and a Masters of Law from Harvard Law School in 1969.

After being admitted to practice law in Puerto Rico, he began a career in public service, serving as general counsel to the president of the University of Puerto Rico, as well as occupying various faculty and administrative positions in the university's school of business. From 1973 to 1977 he served as secretary of the Puerto Rico Department of Consumer Affairs of the Commonwealth of Puerto Rico.

Before being nominated to the Supreme Court, Chief Justice Hernández Denton served on the governing boards of the Puerto Rico Bar Association, the Puerto Rico Legal Services Corporation and the San Juan Community Legal Services Corporation. From 1977 to 1985 he was a professor at the Interamerican University of Puerto Rico School of Law, where he was also director of the Legal Aid Clinic and served as dean from 1984 to 1985. He is also the author of numerous articles that have been published in various law reviews and journals.

Hernández Denton was appointed associate justice of the Puerto Rico Supreme Court in 1985 by Puerto Rico Governor Rafael Hernández Colón, a position he held until being sworn in as chief justice on August 9, 2004, after being nominated by Governor Sila M. Calderón and confirmed by the Puerto Rico Senate.

Chief Justice Hernández Denton is the chairperson of the Board of Bar Examiners of Puerto Rico and the president of the Commission of Judicial Evaluation. As chief justice, he presided the Constitutional Board that was responsible for redistricting the Puerto Rico Senate and House of Representatives in light of the 2010 Census results.

In 2007, he was elected to the board of the Conference of Chief Justices. Chief Justice Hernández Denton is also a member of the American Bar Association, the Iberoamerican Summit of Chief Justices and of the Conference of Constitutional Courts of Latin America and Spain, and an elected member of the American Law Institute. He recently received a Doctor of Law Honoris Causa from the Roger Williams University School of Law in Bristol, Rhode Island.

His tenure in the Supreme Court of Puerto Rico ended with his retirement on April 12, 2014, his 70th birthday.

== See also ==
- List of Hispanic and Latino American jurists
- List of Puerto Ricans
