= Governor of Puerto Rico =

Head of government of the U.S. commonwealth of Puerto Rico

- Seal of the governor

- Standard of the governor

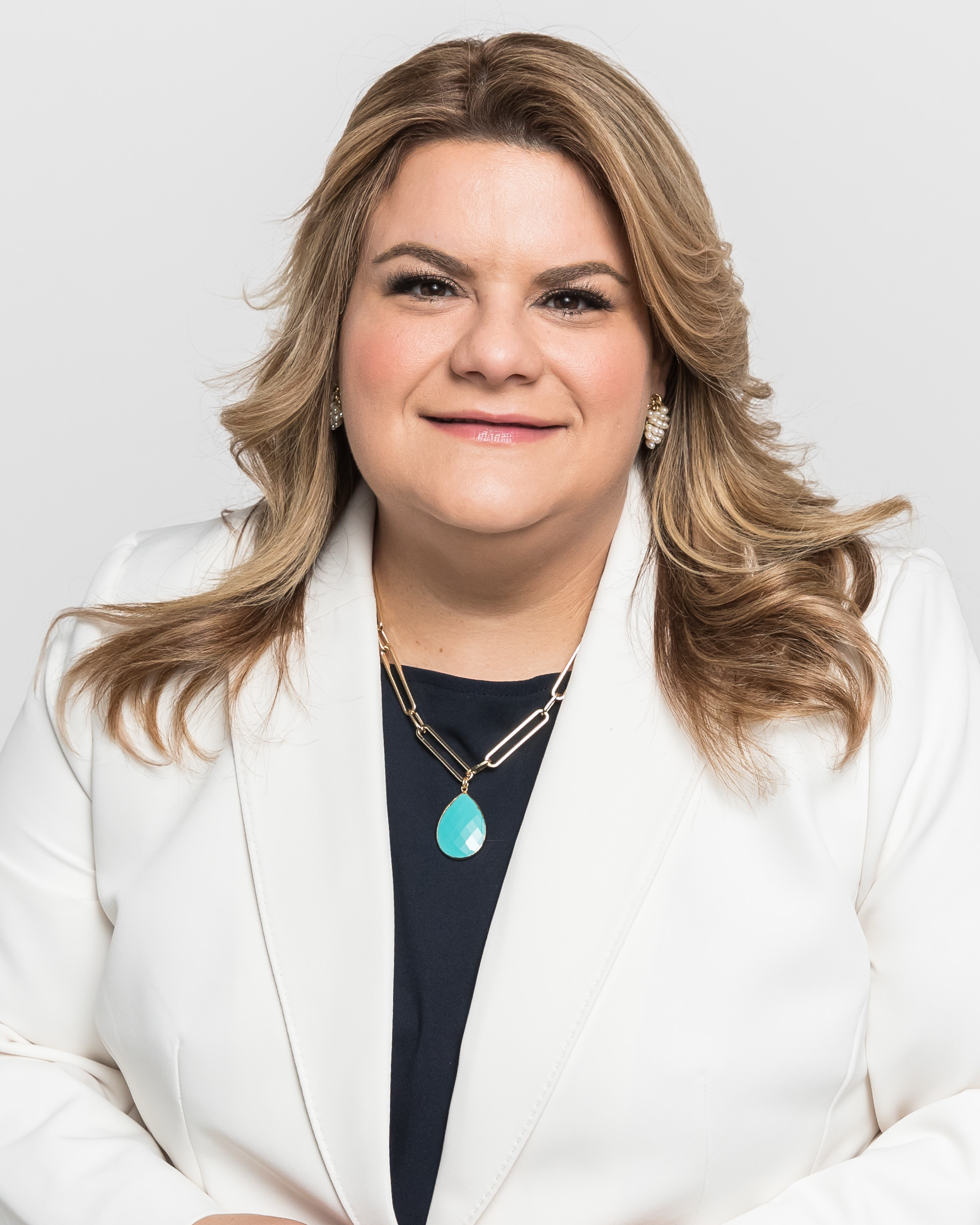
- Incumbent; Jenniffer González-Colón since January 2, 2025
- Executive branch of the Government of Puerto Rico; Office of the Governor of Puerto Rico
- Style: His/Her Excellency (Su Excelencia) (diplomatic); Governor (when presiding); First Executive (third person)
- Residence: La Fortaleza
- Seat: San Juan, Puerto Rico
- Term length: Four years, no term limit
- Inaugural holder: Juan Ponce de León (Spanish colonial government); Luis Muñoz Marín (Constitution of the Commonwealth of Puerto Rico)
- Formation: 1508; 518 years ago (Spanish colonial government); 1952; 74 years ago (Constitution of the Commonwealth of Puerto Rico)
- Succession: Line of succession
- Salary: US$70,000 (2013)
- Website: www.fortaleza.pr.gov (in Spanish)

The governor of Puerto Rico (Spanish: gobernador de Puerto Rico) is the head of government of the Commonwealth of Puerto Rico, an unincorporated territory of the United States. Elected to unlimited four-year terms through popular vote by the residents of the archipelago and island, the governor is the head of the executive branch of the government of Puerto Rico and the commander-in-chief of the Puerto Rico National Guard. Currently, Jenniffer González-Colón is serving as the 190th governor of Puerto Rico.

The governor has a duty to enforce local laws, to convene the Legislative Assembly, the power to either approve or veto bills passed by the Legislative Assembly, to appoint government officers, to appoint justices, and to grant pardons. Since 1948, the governor has been elected by the people of Puerto Rico. Prior to that, the governor was appointed either by the king of Spain (1510–1898) or the president of the United States (1898–1948).

Article IV of the Constitution of Puerto Rico vests the executive power on the governor and empowers them with the faculty to appoint officers. These two faculties in allow the governor to delegate most of their functions while continuing to be the chief executive and head of government.

== History ==
The first known and recorded heads of government in the history of Puerto Rico were the caciques, the tribal chiefs of the natives known as Taínos that inhabited the island before the arrival of Spaniards. It is believed that the cacique rank was apparently established through democratic means. His importance in the tribe was determined by the size of his tribe rather than his warlord skills, since the Taínos were mostly a pacifist culture. Agüeybaná I is the most-well known cacique as he was the one governing all others when the Spaniards arrived in 1493 although many others existed during his period, as well as before and after him.

=== Spanish colonial era ===
When the Spanish Empire colonized Puerto Rico during the 16th century, the Spanish conquistador Juan Ponce de León established himself as the island's first governor. Vicente Yáñez Pinzón had been appointed to take the position of Captain General of the City of Puerto Rico prior to the island's colonization, but he never performed this function. As part of the Spanish Empire, the Spanish monarchy was in charge of appointing the governor of Puerto Rico. The person selected was in charge of the island's development and wealth and was responsible for reporting the colony's status to the government in Spain.

The first native Puerto Rican to perform the function was Juan Ponce de León II, grandson of the conquistador, who served as interim governor in 1579.

After 1580 Puerto Rico's government was established as the Captaincy General of Puerto Rico, and subsequent governors held the office of Captain General as well.

=== As a United States unincorporated territory ===
On July 25, 1898, at the outbreak of the Spanish–American War, Puerto Rico was invaded by the United States. Following the conclusion of the war, Spain was forced to cede Puerto Rico, along with Cuba, the Philippines and Guam, to the United States under the 1898 Treaty of Paris. Puerto Rico began the twentieth century under the military rule of the United States with officials, including the governor, who were appointed by the President of the United States.

In 1900, William McKinley signed the Foraker Act as a United States federal law, which established civilian (limited popular) government on Puerto Rico. The new government had a governor and an executive council appointed by the President, a House of Representatives with 35 elected members, a judicial system with a Supreme Court, and a non-voting Resident Commissioner in Congress. The first civilian governor of the island under the Foraker Act was Charles Herbert Allen. This system was still used after the approval of the Jones–Shafroth Act, which altered the structure of government in Puerto Rico, and was in use until 1948.

Following the approval of the federal Elective Governor Act by President Harry S. Truman in 1947, the governor has been elected through a democratic process every four years since 1948. At that time, Luis Muñoz Marín became the first democratically elected governor.

The current governmental structure was established under the Constitution of the Commonwealth of Puerto Rico, ratified in 1952. Sitting governor Luis Muñoz Marín was re-elected as the first governor under the Constitution. Under Article IV of the Constitution, the governor continues to be popularly elected every four years and is the head of the Commonwealth's executive branch. The governor-elect takes office on January 2 of the following year in a public inaugural ceremony which may be preceded by a private oath-taking ceremony.

In June 2025, a legislative measure proposes that the President of the Senate assume the office of Governor in the event of resignation, death, or removal from office, in the absence of a confirmed Secretary of State.

== Powers ==
The governor is head of the government of Puerto Rico. They have the power to veto legislation that the Puerto Rican legislature passes. The governor also has the power to appoint the members of their cabinet, who in turn must be ratified by the Legislature. The governor also has the power to appoint Justices to the Supreme Court and all the lower courts of the island.

The governor must address the legislature at the beginning of each year to present two speeches, one is the State of the Commonwealth speech and another in which the governor presents the "Recommended Budget" for the next fiscal year, in which the governor proposes to the legislature a budget. They are also the commander-in-chief of the Puerto Rico National Guard and the chief diplomat.

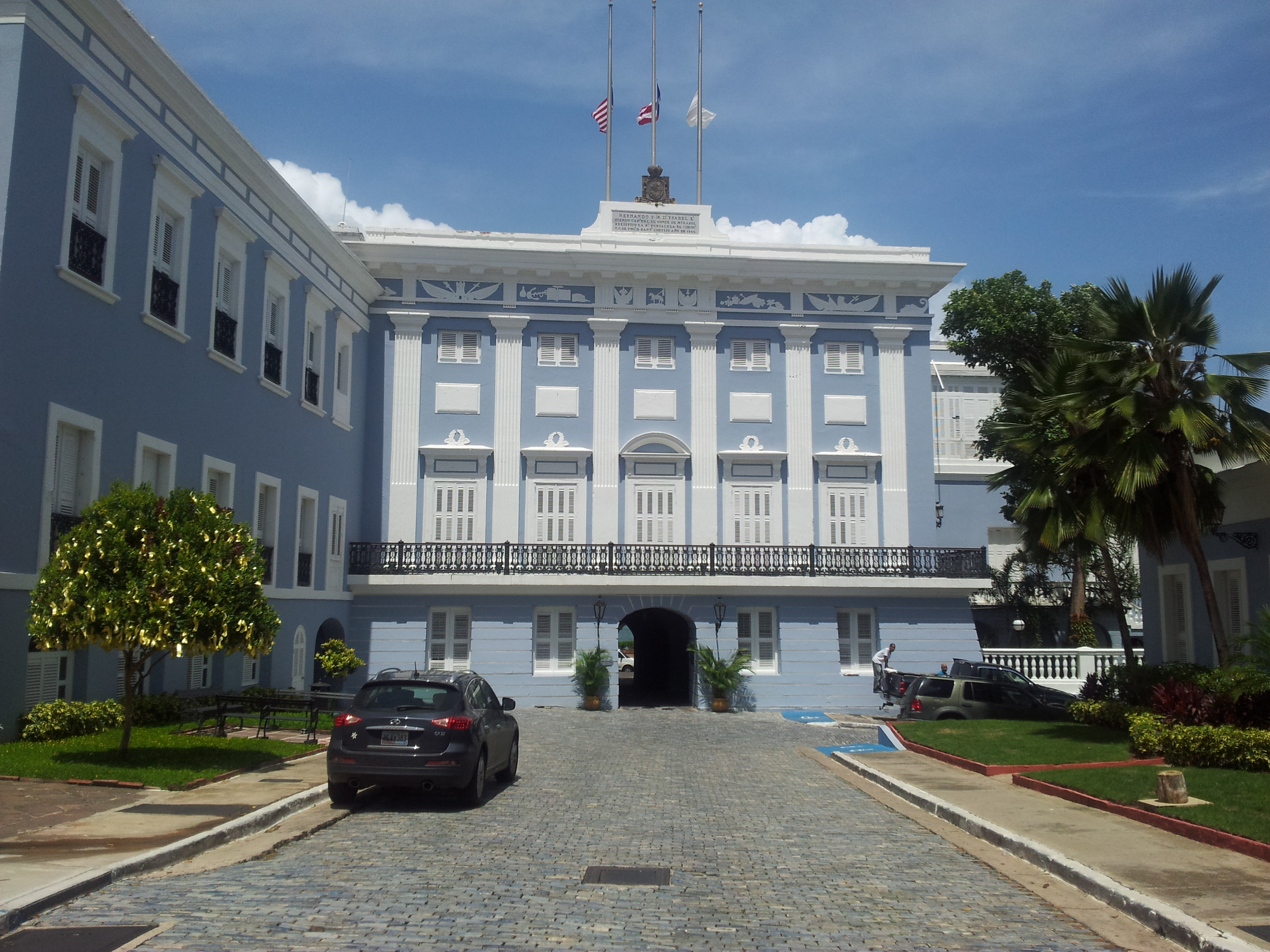
La Fortaleza is the oldest governor's mansion in continuous use in the Western Hemisphere

== Eligibility ==
On July 25, 1952, the Constitution of Puerto Rico was enacted by Governor Muñoz Marín after the approval by Congress and the President of the United States. Pursuant to section Three, Article IV of the Constitution of Puerto Rico, the governor must be a citizen of the United States, a resident of Puerto Rico for five consecutive years prior and at least 35 years old at the time of the election.

The governor serves a four-year term which begins on the second day of January after the year of their election and ends on the date their successor takes office. Consecutive service is unlimited, according to the Constitution of the Island. Luis Muñoz Marín, its first elected governor, served for four consecutive terms from 1949 to 1965, but almost all subsequent governors served either one or two terms; the Constitution of the Commonwealth was ratified by the people of Puerto Rico in 1952. Rafael Hernández Colón, however, served three non-consecutive terms: first from 1973 to 1977, and then from 1985 to 1993.

== Elections ==
The governor is elected by a direct vote of the people. Candidates typically represent a political party, with every elected governor to date (as of 2026) having been a member of the New Progressive Party of Puerto Rico or the Popular Democratic Party of Puerto Rico. Only a plurality vote (more than any other candidate) is required to win election, rather than a majority (more than half the votes).

The Puerto Rico Elections Code states that if the margin of victory of a candidate is less than 0.5% of the votes, a full recount must take place. So far, only in the gubernatorial elections of 1980 and 2004 has a recount occurred.

== Succession ==
Upon the death, resignation, or removal from office (by impeachment and conviction) of a sitting governor, the secretary of state would then take the office of governor until the end of the four-year term. In case the secretary of state is unwilling or unable to assume it, the secretary of justice would assume the governorship, followed by the secretary of treasury, the secretary of education, the secretary of labor and human resources, the secretary of transportation and public works, the secretary of economic development and commerce, the secretary of health and the secretary of agriculture. If none of them is available for succession the Legislative Assembly meets to elect by majority vote of all of its members a governor for the rest of the term. Other provisions exist for the transition between an incumbent governor and a governor-elect.

Similar to some U.S. states, such as California, if the governor is temporarily away from Puerto Rico, the secretary of state, or in their absence the highest ranking Cabinet member in the line of succession, becomes acting governor until the governor's return. In decades past, when off-island gubernatorial travel was infrequent, the powers of the governorship rarely devolved upon the secretary of state or other Cabinet officers. More accessible travel has made the acting governorship a much more common occurrence. During recent times, not only has the secretary of state frequently served as acting governor, but the secretary of justice, and secretary of treasury have as well.

=== 2019 leadership crisis ===
On July 24, 2019, Governor Ricardo Rosselló announced his resignation after two weeks of protests and demonstrations in Puerto Rico. He became the first elected governor to resign. His resignation took effect on August 2, 2019, at 5 pm. Before leaving office, Rosselló nominated Pedro Pierluisi as secretary of state, intending to make Pierluisi his successor, but his nomination was not approved by the full legislature before Rosselló's resignation took effect. Despite not having been confirmed by the Senate of Puerto Rico, Pierluisi was sworn in as governor, which prompted a legal challenge. Less than a week later, the Supreme Court of Puerto Rico declared that Pierluisi had taken office on unconstitutional grounds and removed him from office, effective 5 p.m. AST on August 7. At that time, the next in line was then Secretary of Justice, Wanda Vázquez Garced, who became governor following the original line of succession as it was on August 2 at 5 pm.

== See also ==
- List of governors of Puerto Rico
