= Liana Fiol Matta =

American judge

16th Chief Justice of the Supreme Court of Puerto Rico
- In office April 11, 2014 – February 1, 2016
- Nominated by: Alejandro García Padilla
- Preceded by: Federico Hernández Denton
- Succeeded by: Maite Oronoz Rodríguez

Associate Justice of the Supreme Court of Puerto Rico
- In office February 19, 2004 – April 11, 2014
- Nominated by: Sila María Calderón
- Preceded by: Miriam Naveira
- Succeeded by: Maite Oronoz Rodríguez

Judge of the Puerto Rico Court of Appeals
- In office 1992–2002
- Nominated by: Rafael Hernández Colón

Personal details
- Born: October 20, 1946 (age 79) Rio Piedras, Puerto Rico
- Education: University of Puerto Rico School of Law (JD); Columbia Law School (LL.M., SJD)
- Occupation: judge professor

Liana Fiol Matta (Note: In this Spanish name, the first or paternal surname is Fiol and the second or maternal family name is Matta.) (born October 20, 1946) is a Puerto Rican jurist, who served as the 16th chief justice of the Supreme Court of Puerto Rico. Fiol was born in Rio Piedras, Puerto Rico and is the second woman in Puerto Rican history to serve in the highest court of the island as well as being the second woman to hold the post of Chief Justice.

== Biography ==
Fiol received her law degree from the University of Puerto Rico School of Law, magna cum laude, and later her master's and doctorate degree in Juridical Science from Columbia University. She was a law professor in Puerto Rico during the 1980s until she was appointed Judge of the Court of Appeals of Puerto Rico by Governor Rafael Hernández Colón. She held that seat until 2003, when Governor Sila Calderón appointed her to associated justice for the Puerto Rico Supreme Court. She was confirmed by the Senate and began her duties in February 2004. At present besides being an Associate Justice of the Puerto Rico Supreme Court, she is a tenured professor at the University of Puerto Rico School of Law. On April 11, 2014, Fiol Matta became the 16th chief justice of the Supreme Court of Puerto Rico, after being nominated by Governor Alejandro García Padilla, thus succeeding Federico Hernández Denton as court chief justice. Served as chief justice until her retirement on February 1, 2016.

Justice Fiol Matta was perceived as the leading liberal voice in the Puerto Rican high court.
