= Miriam Naveira =

Chief Justice of Puerto Rico

14th Chief Justice of the Supreme Court of Puerto Rico
- In office 2003–2004
- Appointed by: Sila Calderón
- Preceded by: José Andreu García
- Succeeded by: Federico Hernández Denton

Associate Justice to the Supreme Court of Puerto Rico
- In office 1985–2003
- Appointed by: Rafael Hernández Colón
- Preceded by: Carlos Irizarry Yunqué
- Succeeded by: Liana Fiol Matta

Solicitor General of Puerto Rico
- In office 1976–1973
- Governor: Rafael Hernández Colón

Personal details
- Born: July 28, 1934 Santurce, Puerto Rico
- Died: April 15, 2018 (aged 83) San Juan, Puerto Rico
- Education: College of Mount Saint Vincent (BA); University of Puerto Rico at Río Piedras (JD); Columbia University (LL.M.)

Miriam Naveira de Merly (July 28, 1934 – April 15, 2018) was a Puerto Rican jurist who served in the Supreme Court of Puerto Rico from 1985 to 2004. Naveira was the first woman to serve on the court as well as the first female chief justice of the Supreme Court of Puerto Rico (2003–2004). She was also the first female to serve as the Solicitor General of Puerto Rico (1973-1976).

== Biography ==
Naveira de Merly was born in Santurce, Puerto Rico, in 1934. She obtained her bachelor's degree in chemistry from the College of Mount Saint Vincent and her Juris Doctor degree from the University of Puerto Rico School of Law at UPR Río Piedras.

Naveira was appointed to the Supreme Court in 1985 by Governor Rafael Hernández Colón, becoming the first woman on that court. During her tenure, Naveira was known as a pragmatic and moderate justice.

After the retirement of Chief Justice José Andreu García in 2003, Governor Sila Calderón elevated Justice Naveira to the post of Chief Justice. However, her tenure lasted only seven months since the Constitution of Puerto Rico states that Supreme Court Justices must retire at the age of seventy. Chief Justice Miriam Naveira retired in July 2004. She was succeeded by her colleague Federico Hernández Denton.

Her daughter Miriam Rodón Naveira is an environmental scientist working at the federal government of the United States which was awarded a Silver Medal for Superior Service and a Suzanne Olive EEO and Diversity Award both by the EPA. She was also the first Hispanic woman to serve as branch chief of the EPA's National Exposure Research Laboratory (NERL) and later the first Hispanic woman to become deputy director of NERL's Environmental Sciences Division.

Miriam Naveira died on April 15, 2018, at the age of 83. She was buried at the Puerto Rico Memorial Cemetery in Carolina, Puerto Rico.

== See also ==
- List of Hispanic and Latino American jurists
- List of Puerto Ricans
- History of women in Puerto Rico

Legal offices
Preceded by José Andreu García	Chief Justice of Puerto Rico; 2003–2004	Succeeded by Federico Hernández Denton
Preceded by Carlos Irizarry Yunqué	Associate Justice of the Supreme Court of Puerto Rico; 1985–2003	Succeeded by Liana Fiol Matta
