= Fernando Figueroa Santiago =

American lawyer

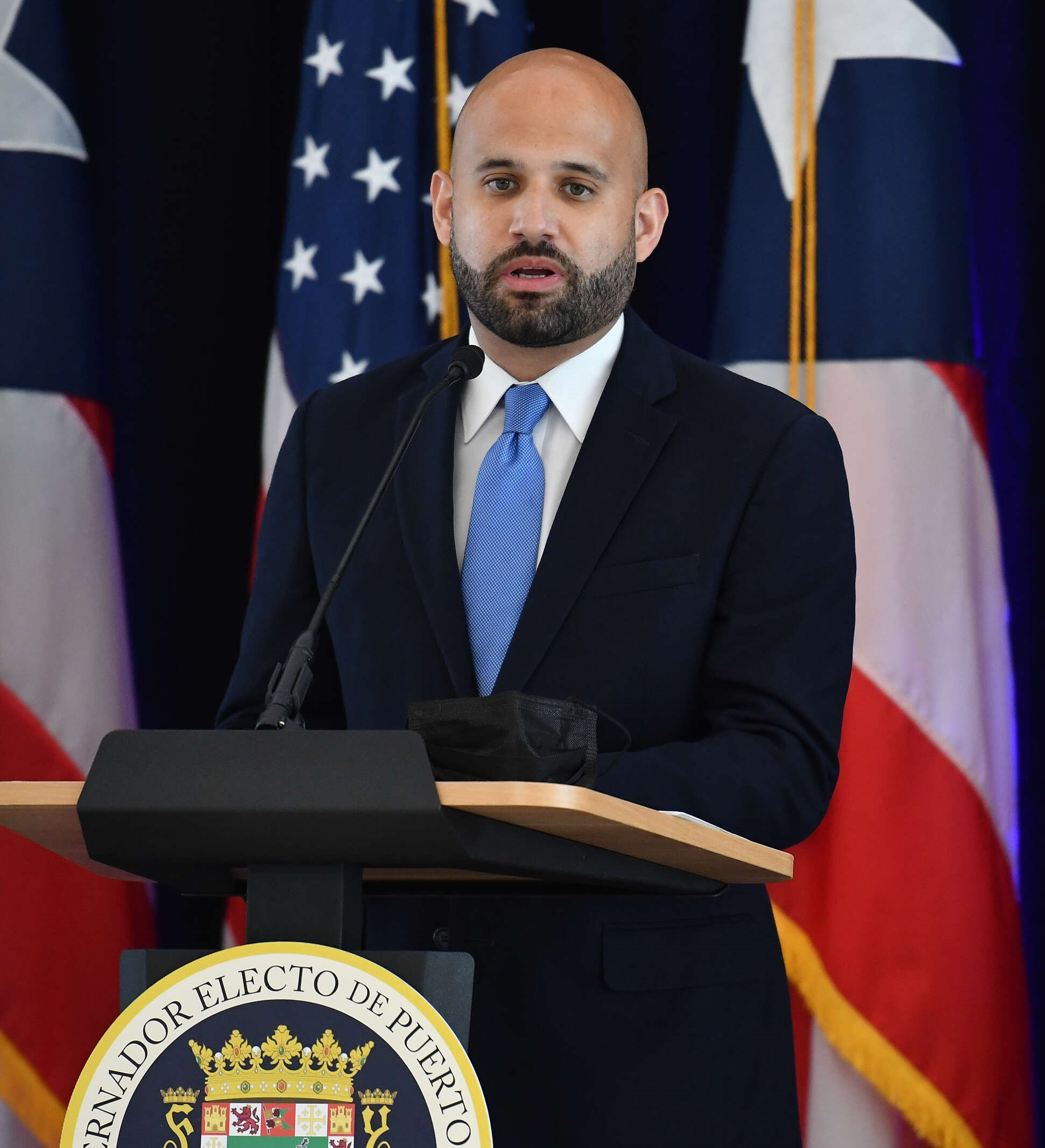

21st Solicitor General of Puerto Rico
- In office June 15, 2021 – January 2, 2025
- Governor: Pedro R. Pierluisi Urrutia
- Preceded by: Isaías Sánchez Báez
- Succeeded by: Omar Andino Figueroa

Personal details
- Born: July 30, 1985 (age 41) Caguas, Puerto Rico
- Education: University of Puerto Rico at Río Piedras (BA); University of Puerto Rico School of Law (JD)

Fernando Figueroa Santiago (born July 30, 1985) is an American lawyer who served as the 21st Solicitor General of Puerto Rico. On December 17, 2020, Governor Pedro R. Pierluisi Urrutia nominated Figueroa Santiago to the Office of the Solicitor General of Puerto Rico. On May 10, 2021, the Senate of Puerto Rico confirmed Figueroa in a unanimous vote. He was sworn into the post on June 15, 2021.

== Early life and education ==
Figueroa was born in Caguas, Puerto Rico. At the age of six, he moved to Juncos and jumped from rental house to another as well as from school. But his teachers saw the potential in him, and through his exception, they recommended him to enroll in the town school (Isabel Flores), which did not correspond to him by physical address and from which he graduated in 2003.

Later he studied at the University of Puerto Rico, Río Piedras Campus, where he obtained, with high honors, magna cum laude, a bachelor's degree in Political science. From August 2006 to May 2007, he studied Political Science and Public administration at the State University of New York. In August 2008, he was admitted to the University of Puerto Rico School of Law, obtaining a Juris Doctor degree with high honors, magna cum laude.

== Career ==
In 2007 Figueroa worked as an intern at the U.S. Department of Health & Human Services in Washington DC. There, he had the opportunity to analyze federal proposals related to federal health programs in support of the deputy director of the Office of Head Start for granting funds to different interested organizations around the United States. Subsequently, in the summer of 2009, he clerkship in the Puerto Rico First Instance Court of Caguas, to the Superior Judge, Hon. Berthaida Seijo Ortíz. From November 2012 to February 2013, he was Legal Officer II and Legal Technician in the Central Investigation Panel of the Supreme Court of Puerto Rico.

In March 2013, he began working in private practice as an associate attorney in the litigation department of Pietrantoni Méndez Álvarez, LLC. In August 2013, he returned to the Supreme Court as Principal Legal Officer of Associate Justice Hon. Edgardo Rivera García, stay that ended in 2017. From January 2017 to December 2020, Figueroa served as Legal Advisor II in the Office of the Governor of Puerto Rico. He eventually served as the principal legal adviser to the Puerto Rico Secretary of the Interior.
