= Margarita Mercado Echegaray =

Puerto Rican lawyer

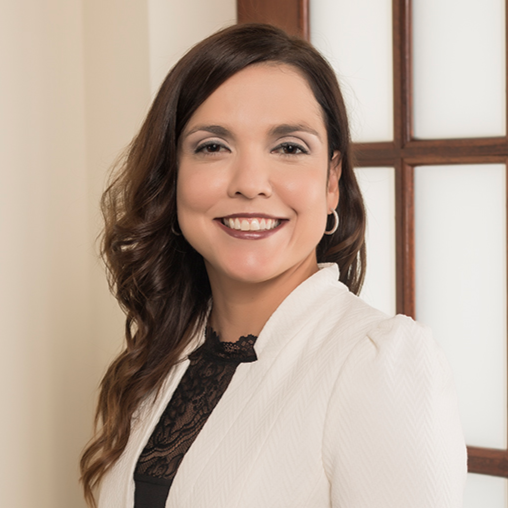

18th Solicitor General of Puerto Rico
- In office January 13, 2013 – 2017
- Governor: Alejandro García Padilla
- Succeeded by: Luis R. Román Negrón

Personal details
- Born: Margarita Mercado Echegaray; December 7, 1980 (age 45) San Juan, Puerto Rico
- Party: Popular Democratic Party
- Education: University of Puerto Rico (BA) University of Puerto Rico School of Law (JD) Columbia Law School (LL.M.)
- Occupation: attorney

Margarita Mercado Echegaray (born December 7, 1980) is an attorney, the former Solicitor General of Puerto Rico, and the youngest to hold such post. (Note: Metro (2013; in Spanish) "Mercado Echegaray, de 32 años, se convirtió en la procuradora general más joven y tendrá como responsabilidad defender al Estado en los tribunales de Apelaciones y Supremo.") (Note: Senate of Puerto Rico (2013; in Spanish) "La licenciada Margarita Mercado Echegaray nació el 7 de diciembre de 1980 en San Juan, Puerto Rico, she is currently single.") Mercado has a bachelor's degree in political science and history of the Americas, and a juris doctor from the University of Puerto Rico School of Law. She also has a master of laws in constitutional law and civil rights from Columbia University. (Note: Senate of Puerto Rico (2013; in Spanish) "En ese mismo año (2009) completó una maestría en derecho constitucional y derechos civiles en la Escuela de Derecho de la Universidad de Columbia en el Estado de Nueva York.") Before her appointment, Mercado served as a law clerk at the United States Court of Appeals for the First Circuit, and as a law clerk for Anabelle Rodríguez in the Supreme Court of Puerto Rico.

Mercado's most prominent cases includes the defense of the government of Puerto Rico against a lawsuit presented by the Puerto Rico Association of Members of the Judiciary. The Association claims that Act 162 of 2013 is unconstitutional and that it minimizes the principle of judicial independence.
