= Anabelle Rodríguez =

Puerto Rican judge

Associate Justice of the Puerto Rico Supreme Court
- In office 2004–2020
- Nominated by: Sila Calderón
- Preceded by: Federico Hernández Denton
- Succeeded by: Camille Rivera Pérez

Secretary of Justice of Puerto Rico
- In office 2001–2004
- Nominated by: Sila Calderón
- Preceded by: José Fuentes Agostini
- Succeeded by: Roberto Sánchez Ramos

Solicitor General of Puerto Rico
- In office 1991–1992
- Nominated by: Rafael Hernández Colón
- Preceded by: Jorge E. Pérez-Díaz
- Succeeded by: Pedro Delgado Hernández

Personal details
- Born: December 24, 1950 (age 75) Santurce, Puerto Rico
- Education: University of Puerto Rico, Río Piedras (BA, JD)

Anabelle Rodríguez Rodríguez (born December 24, 1950) is a Puerto Rican lawyer, former state Attorney General, and former Associate Justice of the Supreme Court of Puerto Rico. In December 2020 she reached the age of 70, at which point the Puerto Rico Constitution mandated her retirement from the Supreme Court of Puerto Rico.

== Early life and education ==
Rodríguez was born in 1950 in Santurce, Puerto Rico, and obtained a bachelor's degree in History, magna cum laude, from the University of Puerto Rico at Rio Piedras. In 1985, she obtained a juris doctor magna cum laude, from the University of Puerto Rico School of Law. She has two sons: Fernando Vela, a web developer based in Gainesville, Florida, and Ricardo Vela, a history teacher in White Plains, New York.

== Career ==
Rodriguez held various positions in the Puerto Rican private and government sector. She began her career in law as Law Clerk to Superior Court Judge Angel G. Hermida.

In 1997, she was nominated by Bill Clinton to be U.S. District Court Judge for the District of Puerto Rico, but her nomination was rejected by the Senate Judiciary Committee three times.

In 2001, she was appointed Secretary of Justice of Puerto Rico by Governor Sila Calderón. She worked to extend domestic violence protections to homosexual couples on the island.

In 2004, Calderon appointed Rodriguez to the Supreme Court. She officially took office on August 19, 2004, becoming the third woman ever to serve in the Supreme Court of Puerto Rico. In February 2016, she was acting Chief Justice of the Court prior to the swearing in of Maite Oronoz Rodríguez. On December 10, 2020 judge Anabelle Rodríguez reached her mandatory retirement from the court at the age of 70.

Legal offices
Preceded by Federico Hernández Denton	Associate Justice of the Puerto Rico Supreme Court; 2004–2020	Succeeded by Camille Rivera Pérez
Preceded by José Fuentes Agostini	Secretary of Justice of Puerto Rico; 2001–2004	Succeeded by Roberto Sánchez Ramos
