= David Helfeld =

Dean of the University of Puerto Rico School of Law

David Martin Helfeld (October 21, 1922 — April 23, 2025) was the longest-serving dean of the University of Puerto Rico School of Law (UPR), he was a professor emeritus. He taught law until aged 87. He also served as a close advisor to long-time UPR Chancellor and President Jaime Benítez Rexach.

Helfeld, who did not practice law, served as an arbitrator and a Special Master appointed by the federal district court in Puerto Rico regarding a mental health class action against the Government of Puerto Rico.

== Personal life ==
Helfeld was born in New York City on October 21, 1922, to Isidore Helfeld and Sylvia Hoffman, both Ashkenazi Jews from Romania and Poland respectively. After graduating law school from Yale University in 1948, Helfeld was brought to Puerto Rico by the hand of Dr. Jaime Benítez Rexach, then rector of the University of Puerto Rico. There, he married Raquel Armenteros Vázquez, a co-founder of Puerto Rico's League of Women Voters. He had several sons, including Jan Edward, an attorney, Stephen, and Peter.

== Professional career ==
David M. Helfeld was a graduate of Yale Law School and went on to do postdoctoral studies at Harvard Law School. Helfeld was recruited by Chancellor Benítez to replace Dr. Raúl Serrano Geyls, who resigned as law professor to pursue a career in private practice that would eventually lead to appointment as an Associate Justice of the Puerto Rico Supreme Court. He was Dean of the institution from 1960 to 1973. He began teaching Administrative Law and Labor Law, after being blacklisted as a result of a scathing attack by Federal Bureau of Investigation director J. Edgar Hoover, who accused Helfeld of being a communist. The attack was triggered for having co-authored as a graduate fellow at Yale University an article criticizing civil rights policies in the early days of what would come to be known as McCarthyism.

When former Franklin D. Roosevelt Brain Trust member and former Governor Rexford Guy Tugwell returned to UPR, Helfeld met with him and helped him draft a new United States Constitution, which Tugwell wished to propose but which even Helfeld considered impossible to enact.

He was appointed Dean of the School of Law in 1960, succeeding professor Manuel Rodríguez Ramos, a position he held for over 13 years until 1974. During his term as Dean, he supervised the design, by architect Henry Klumb, and construction of the new Law School building and recruited a varied, internationally diverse faculty.

After resigning as Dean, he remained on the faculty until 1977, when he retired, and taught at the Pontifical Catholic University School of Law in Ponce from 1977 until 1987, when he returned to UPR on a part-time basis.

== Publications ==
Books

Helfeld, D. M., Don Jaime Benítez: su papel creador como constitucionalista y en el desarrollo de la educación legal. Published in Don Jaime Benítez: entre la universidad y la política, edited by Acevedo, Héctor Luis. San Juan, PR: Universidad Interamericana, (2008).

Helfeld, D. M. & Wipfier W. L. Mbareté: Ley superior del Paraguay: informe sobre la negación de los derechos humanos en el Paraguay por la Tercera Comisión de Investigación de la Liga Internacional de Derechos Humanos. New York: International League for Human Rights (1982).

Helfeld, D. M. & Wipfler W. L. Mbareté: The higher law of Paraguay: report on the denial of human rights in Paraguay / by the Third Commission of Enquiry of the International League for Human Rights. New York: International League for Human Rights, (1980).

Stephansky, B. S. & Helfeld, D. M. & Wipfler W. L. Denial of human rights in Paraguay: report of Second Commission of Enquiry of the International League for Human Rights. New York: International League for Human Rights, (1977).

Helfeld, D. M. Informe sobre la renuncia en masa de 48 miembros del Cuerpo de Investigaciones Criminales: sometido a la Superintendencia de la Policía. San Juan, PR, (1968).

Helfeld, D. M. Proposed conclusions, findings, recommendations and rate order, rulings on exceptions, and final recommended rate order.' San Juan, PR: Economic Development Administrator, (1965).

Helfeld, D. M. Report in the matter of rates, fees, rentals, and other charges applicable at the Puerto Rico International Airport for the three years beginning June 1, 1961. San Juan, PR: Economic Development Administrator, (1965).

Articles

Thomas I. Emerson and David M. Helfeld, Loyalty among government employees, 58 Yale L. J. 1 (1948)

David M. Helfeld, Historical prelude to the Constitution of the Commonwealth of Puerto Rico, 21 Rev. Jur. U. P. R. 135 (1951–1952)

David M. Helfeld, Congressional intent and attitude toward Public Law 600 and the Constitution of the Commonwealth of Puerto Rico, 21 Rev. Jur. U. P. R. 255 (1951–1952)

David M. Helfeld, Discrimination for political beliefs and associations, 25 Revista del Colegio de Abogados de Puerto Rico, 5 (1964)

How Much of the Federal Constitution is Likely to be held Applicable to the Commonwealth of Puerto Rico?, 110 F.R.D. 452 (1985)

David M. Helfeld, “El Seminario sobre la Intimidad: su origen, el significado de su obra y su funcionamiento futuro”, RJUPR, (Vol.72), 2003, p. 651

David M. Helfeld, Narcotics, Puerto Rico, Public Policy: In search of truth and wisdom, RJUPR, Volumen 75, 2006, p. 1029

Helfeld, D. M. Derecho constitucional. Revista Jurídica de la Universidad de Puerto Rico, v. 77 no. 2 (2008).

Helfeld, D. M. El factor de la demora en los tribunales de Puerto Rico. Revista Jurídica de la Universidad de Puerto Rico, v, 76 no. 4 (2007).

Helfeld, D. M. Derecho constitucional. Revista Jurídica de la Universidad de Puerto Rico, v. 76 no. 2 (2007).

Helfeld, D. M. Narcotics, Puerto Rico, Public Policy: In Search of Truth and Wisdom. Revista Jurídica de la Universidad de Puerto Rico v. 75 no. 4 (2006) p. 1029-69.

Helfeld, D. M. Derecho laboral. Revista Jurídica de la Universidad de Puerto Rico, v. 74 no. 3 (2005) p. 709-35.

Helfeld, D. M. Derecho laboral. Revista Jurídica de la Universidad de Puerto Rico, v. 73 no. 3(2004) p. 619-45.

Helfeld, D. M. Derecho laboral. Revista Jurídica de la Universidad de Puerto Rico, v. 72 no. 3(2003) p. 459-95.

Helfeld, D. M. La política laboral constitucional del 1952: sus principios essentiales y los factores que la influenciaron. Revista Jurídica de la Universidad de Puerto Rico, v. 72 no. 2 (2003) p. 143- 62.

Helfeld, D. M., reviewer El arbitraje obrero-patronal (Book Review). Revista Jurídica de la Universidad de Puerto Rico, v. 71 no. 1 (2002) p. 19 1–204.

Helfeld, D. M. Derecho laboral. Revista Jurídica de la Universidad de Puerto Rico, v. 71 no. 2 (2002) p. 447-69.

Helfeld, D. M. Derecho laboral. Revista Jurídica de la Universidad de Puerto Rico, v. 70 no. 2 (2001) p. 447-89.

Helfeld, D. M. La jurisprudencia creadora: factor determinante en el desarrollo del derecho de arbitraje en Puerto Rico. Revista Jurídica de la Universidad de Puerto Rico, v. 70 no. 1 (2001) p. 1- 128.

Helfeld, D. M. Derecho laboral. Revista Jurídica de la Universidad de Puerto Rico, v. 69 no. 2 (2000) p. 533-62.

Helfeld, D. M. Derecho constitucional. Revista Jurídica de la Universidad de Puerto Rico, v. 68 no. 2 (1999) p. 345-408.

Helfeld, D. M. Derecho laboral. Revista Jurídica de la Universidad de Puerto Rico, v. 64 no. 4 (1995) p. 82 1-56.

Helfeld, D. M. Hacia una revisión sistemática de la obra legislativa. Revista Jurídica de la Universidad de Puerto Rico, v. 64 no. 2 (1995) p. 165-178.

Helfeld, D. M. Derecho laboral. Revista Jurídica de la Universidad de Puerto Rico, v. 63 no. 2 (1994) p. 297-3 16.

Helfeld, D. M. Derecho constitucional. Revista Jurídica de la Universidad de Puerto Rico, v. 60 no. 3 (1991) p. 791-864.

Helfeld, D. M. Comentario a la ponencia del Magistrado Don Miguel Rodríguez Piñero [Discussion of Los tribunales constitucionales en Europa. M. Rodríguez-Piñero. 57 Rey. Jur. U.P.R. 5-32 `88]. Revista Jurídica de la Universidad de Puerto Rico, v. 57 (1988) p. 33-41.

Helfeld, D. M. How much of the federal constitution is likely to be held applicable to the commonwealth of Puerto Rico? Revista Jurídica de la Universidad de Puerto Rico, v. 39 (1970) p. 169-206.

Helfeld, D. M. Annual report and prospectus for a ten-year plan. Revista Jurídica de la Universidad de Puerto Rico, v. 30 (1961) p. 3-32.

Helfeld, D. M., reviewer American colonial careerist (Book Review). Revista Jurídica de la Universidad de Puerto Rico, v. 26 (1956–1957) p. 359-362.

Helfeld, D. M., Recession [Notes]. Revista Jurídica de la Universidad de Puerto Rico, v. 26 (1956–1957) p. 287-294.

Helfeld, D. M., reviewer American legal system; the administration of justice in the United States by judicial, administrative, military and arbitral tribunals (Book Review). Revista Jurídica de la Universidad de Puerto Rico, v. 24 (1955) p. 295.

Helfeld, D. M., reviewer Labor relations and the law (Book Review). Revista Jurídica de la Universidad de Puerto Rico, v. 23 (1953–1954) p. 86-90.

Helfeld, D. M. Factors conditioning Puerto Rican labor policy. Revista Jurídica de la Universidad de Puerto Rico, v. 22 (1952–1953) p. 310-78.

Helfeld, D. M., reviewer Prisoners at the bar (Book Review). Revista Jurídica de la Universidad de Puerto Rico, v. 21(1951–1952) p. 350-4.

Helfeld, D. M. Congressional intent and attitude toward Public Law 600 and the Constitution of the Commonwealth of Puerto Rico. Revista Jurídica de la Universidad de Puerto Rico, v. 21(1951–1952) p. 255-320.

Helfeld, D. M., reviewer Guilty or not guilty (Book Review). Revista Jurídica de la Universidad de Puerto Rico, v. 21 (May 1952) p. 350-4.

Helfeld, D. M. Historical prelude to the Constitution of the Commonwealth of Puerto Rico. Revista Jurídica de la Universidad de Puerto Rico, v. 21(1951–1952) p. 135-54.

Helfeld, D. M. El preludio histórico a la Constitución del Estado Libre Asociado de Puerto Rico. Revista Jurídica de la Universidad de Puerto Rico, v. 21 (1951–1952) p. 182-202.

Helfeld, D. M., reviewer for defense (Book Review). Revista Jurídica de la Universidad de Puerto Rico, y. 19 (January 1950) p. 2 19–26.

Helfeld, D. M., reviewer American democracy; a commentary and an interpretation (Book Review). Revista Jurídica de la Universidad de Puerto Rico, v. 19 (September 1949) p. 68-76.

Helfeld, D. M. NAALC in the eyes of the beholder. Connecticut Journal of International Law, v. 10 (Spring 1995) pp. 365–78.

Helfeld, D. M. How much of the United States Constitution and Statues are applicable to the Commonwealth of Puerto Rico? Federal Rules Decisions, Vol. 110, (1986), pp. 452–474 (cite as 110 F.R.D. 449).

Helfeld, D. M. Las relaciones constitucionales entre Puerto Rico y los Estados Unidos. Revista de Derecho Puertorriqueño v. 24 (March/June 1985) pp. 297–329.

Helfeld, D. M., reviewer U.S. multinationals and worker participation in management (Book Review). Vanderbilt Journal of Transnational Law v. 16 (Summer 1983) pp. 721–34.

Helfeld, D. M. Toward an improved compact of association between Puerto Rico and the United States. Revista del Colegio de Abogados de Puerto Rico, v. 38 (November 1977) p. 509-27.

Helfeld, D. M. Discrimination for political beliefs and associations. Revista del Colegio de Abogados de Puerto Rico, v. 25 (November 1964) p. 5.

Helfeld, D. M., reviewer Freedom to read (Book Review). University of Detroit Law Journal, v. 35 (February 1958) p. 416.

Helfeld, D. M., reviewer Comparative law---cases and materials (Book Review). Tulane Law Review, v. 25 (June 1951) p. 539-45.

Helfeld, D. M. Study of Justice Department policies on wire tapping. Lawyers Guild Review, v. 9 (Spring 1949) p. 57-69.

Helfeld, D. M. & Emerson, Thomas 1. Loyalty among government employees. The Yale Law Journal, v. 58 (December 1948) p. 1-143.

Helfeld, D. M. & Emerson, Thomas 1. Reply by the authors [article]. Yale Law Journal, v. 58 (1948–1949) p. 412-421.

Groner, Isaac N.; Helfeld, David M., Race discrimination in housing [comments]. The Yale Law Journal, v. 57 (1947–1948) p. 426-458.

== Awards and recognitions ==
The University of Puerto Rico's Law Journal devoted an issue, No. 4, Vol. 76, 2007, as a tribute to Dean Helfeld, with articles such as The Legacy of a Brave Man, by Anthony Guadalupe Baerga, and Homenaje a Don David en Tres Actos (Tribute to Don David in three acts), by Carlos G. Mera Lastra.

- Member, National Academy of Arbitrators
- Member, Comisión del Gobernador para Recomendar Jueces, 1966–72, 1992.
- Consultant to the International Legal Center, 1966–75; un Estudio Encomendado por el International Legal Center y la Ford Foundation sobre el Estado de la Educación Legal en las Escuelas Principales de Derecho de las Naciones de América Latina.
- Member, numerous Minimum Wage Committees, P.R. Department of Labor
- Legal Counsel to the Puerto Rico Civil Rights Commission, 1968–72.
- President, Comisión del Gobernador para Estudiar las Relaciones del Trabajo en el Servicio Público, 1973–75.
- President, Comisión Consultiva del Gobernador Sobre la Política Laboral, 1977–84.
- Legal Counsel to the Attorney General of Puerto Rico, 1983.
- Member, Commissions of Enquiry on Human Rights in Paraguay, sponsored by the International League for Human Rights, 1977, 1980.
- Special Master, Federal Mental Health Case, 1985–97, 2003–04.
- Special Master, Federal Mental Retardation Case, 1987–89.
- Director, Talleres Sobre el Arbitraje Laboral en España, Uruguay, Honduras y Guatemala durante la Década de 1980.
- Member, American Arbitration Association Task Force on NAFTA, 1994.
- Legal Counsel to the Secretary of Health of Puerto Rico, 1997.
- Legal Counsel to the Comptroller of Puerto Rico, 1998.
- Member, Comité Consultivo al Sistema de “ADR” Adscrito a los Tribunales de Justicia de Puerto Rico, 1999.
- Member, Comité del Presidente de la UPR para la Revisión del Reglamento General de la Universidad, 2002.

== Death ==
David Helfeld died at 102 years of age.

== Sources ==
https://web.archive.org/web/20121020050738/http://www.yale.edu/prconf/agenda.html

https://web.archive.org/web/20110724214806/http://www.academiajurisprudenciapr.org/pdf/Revista_Volumen_VII.pdf

THOMAS I. EMERSON, THE SYSTEM OF FREEDOM OF EXPRESSION (1970). Cf. THOMAS I. EMERSON AND DAVID HABER, POLITICAL AND CIVIL RIGHTS IN THE UNITED STATES, (Foreword, Robert M. Hutchins), ii y iii. 1952

Carlos G. Mera Lastra, Homenaje a Don David En Tres Acto, Revista Juridica Universidad de Puerto Rico, Volume 76, Number 4, 2007, 947.

Anthony Guadalupe Baerga, The Legacy of a Brave Man, Revista Juridica Universidad de Puerto Rico, Volume 76, Number 4, 2007, 939.
