= Armindo Cadilla =

American judge

Associate Justice of the Supreme Court of Puerto Rico
- In office 1973 – February 16, 1975
- Appointed by: Rafael Hernández Colón
- Preceded by: Rafael Hernández Matos
- Succeeded by: Jorge Díaz Cruz

Personal details
- Born: Armindo Cadilla Ginorio; January 11, 1906 Arecibo, Puerto Rico
- Died: February 16, 1975 (aged 69) Río Piedras, Puerto Rico
- Education: University of Puerto Rico School of Law (JD)
- Occupation: Lawyer, judge

Armindo Cadilla Ginorio (January 11, 1906 – February 16, 1975), served as an associate justice of the Puerto Rico Supreme Court from 1973 to 1975.

Born in Arecibo, Puerto Rico on January 11, 1906, he studied law at the University of Puerto Rico School of Law. He was a member of the Phi Eta Mu fraternity.

In 1973, at the age of 67, he was appointed by Governor Rafael Hernández Colón as an Associate Justice. After 10 years serving on the bench in Ponce, he won the admiration of former Associate Justice and Ponce native Rafael Hernández Matos, as well as his son Rafael, elected Governor in 1972.

Cadilla Ginorio's service on the Supreme Court was short-lived, since he died in Río Piedras, Puerto Rico at the age of 69 on February 16, 1975, two years and two days after having joined the Court. He was buried at Cementerio Municipal de Arecibo (Viejo) in Arecibo, Puerto Rico.

== Sources ==
- La Justicia en sus Manos by Luis Rafael Rivera, ISBN 1-57581-884-1

Legal offices
Preceded by Rafael Hernández Matos	Associate Justice of the Supreme Court of Puerto Rico; 1973-1975	Succeeded by Jorge Díaz Cruz
