= Orlandy Cabrera Valentin =

American attorney (born 1996)

Orlandy Cabrera
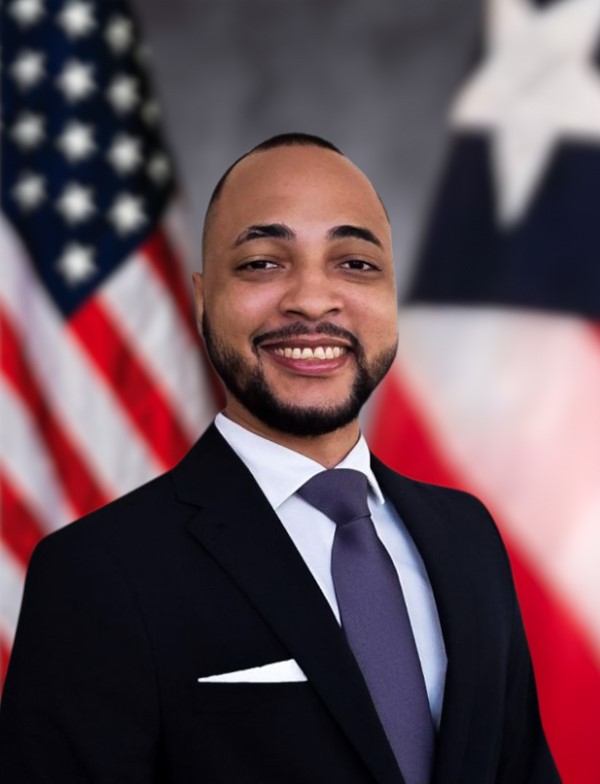
- Official portrait, 2025

Assistant District Attorney
- Incumbent
- Assumed office June 11, 2025
- President: Donald J. Trump
- Governor: Jenniffer A. González-Colón

Assistant Solicitor General
- In office July 1, 2022 – June 11, 2025
- President: Joe Biden
- Governor: Pedro R. Pierluisi Urrutia

Personal details
- Born: Orlandy Cabrera Valentin; April 21, 1996 (age 30)
- Education: University of Puerto Rico (BA, JD)

Orlandy Cabrera Valentin (born April 21, 1996) is an American attorney who served as Assistant District Attorney since 2025. He served as Assistant Solicitor General of Puerto Rico in the criminal division from 2022 to 2025. On April 23, 2025, the Governor of Puerto Rico, Jennifer A. González-Colón nominated Cabrera as Assistant District Attorney. On June 2, 2025, he was confirmed by the Senate and was sworn in, on June 11, 2025.

== Early life and education ==
Cabrera Valentin earned a Bachelor of Arts in political science, magna cum laude, from the University of Puerto Rico at Mayagüez in 2018. As an undergraduate, he served as a student representative to the Department of Social Sciences, acted as president of the Political Science Student Association, and participated in research and community service initiatives.

He later received his Juris Doctor, with honors, from the University of Puerto Rico School of Law in 2021. During law school, he became the first and only first-year law student to win the Don Miguel Velázquez Rivera National Moot Court Competition, one of the institution's most prestigious advocacy competitions.

== Career ==
Before entering public service, Cabrera Valentin practiced commercial litigation at Correa-Acevedo & Abesada, PSC. He also completed a summer associate position at O'Neill & Borges LLC and served as a judicial law clerk at the San Juan Superior Court, where he worked on insurance litigation arising from Hurricanes Irma and Maria.

In July 2022, he joined the Puerto Rico Department of Justice as an Assistant Solicitor General. In that role, he represented the Commonwealth before the Puerto Rico Court of Appeals and the Supreme Court of Puerto Rico, litigating cases involving constitutional law, criminal procedure, and public policy, including matters concerning gender-based violence and the protection of the public interest.

In 2024, he was named Assistant Solicitor General of the Year in recognition of his professional performance. In that capacity, Cabrera Valentin successfully defended the government position in Pueblo v. Pedro Marrero, 213 DPR 404 (2023), where the state Supreme Court held that the Constitution does not require the suppression of an intelligent and voluntary confession when the only challenge is that the suspect was brought to a probable cause hearing thirty-six hours after his warrantless arrest. Similarly, he secured an important victory in Pueblo v. Juan C. Vidal Rosa, KLCE2023-01281, where the Seventh Panel of the Puerto Rico Court of Appeals held that —during the medical-competency examination under Rule 240 of the Puerto Rico Criminal Procedure Rules— the time frame from the "reasonable basis" determination until the defendant is declared competent to stand trial, must be excluded from the six-month constitutional pretrial detention period. In reaching that conclusion, the appellate court discarded Pueblo v. Pagán Medina II, 178 DPR 228 (2010) as a binding precedent because the reasoning to the contrary employed by the state Supreme Court was a dictum.

Among the most notable cases handled as Assistant District Attorney was Pueblo v. Fabián Torres de Jesús, a murder prosecution arising from the fatal shooting of a 15-year-old in Bayamón. Cabrera filed six criminal charges against the 16-year-old Torres de Jesús, who was prosecuted as an adult, including first-degree murder, destruction of evidence, and multiple violations of Puerto Rico's Weapons Act. After presenting the Commonwealth's evidence at the preliminary hearing, the Court found probable cause on five of the counts.

== Selected publications and lectures ==
Articles

1. COLUMNA - La dicotomía entre la acumulación discrecional de causas criminales y el efecto del concurso de delitos en procesos judiciales separados. Microjuris · Dec 21, 2024.
2. COLUMNA – El Presidente no es un "Oficial de Estados Unidos". Dec 20, 2023.
3. COLUMNA – Un breve vistazo a los orígenes de la jurisdicción suplementaria en el foro federal. Aug 29, 2023.
4. La secuela de Carpenter v. United States: Un vistazo a la constitucionalidad del uso de una cámara de vigilancia sobre una residencia y sus inmediaciones. Mar 16, 2023.
5. COLUMNA – En pañales la práctica apelativa en Puerto Rico. Jan 27, 2023.
6. COLUMNA – La importancia de una política institucional hacia la argumentación oral en el Tribunal Supremo. Oct 16, 2022.
7. Los derechos de las víctimas de delito en Puerto Rico y en Estados Unidos Mexicanos en el sistema de justicia penal. Jul 1, 2020.
8. Doble Sufrimiento: Mujeres víctimas de violencia doméstica ante ejecuciones de hipotecas. Mar 1, 2020
