= José Andreu García =

Chief Justice of the Supreme Court of Puerto Rico (1992–2003)

13th Chief Justice of the Supreme Court of Puerto Rico
- In office February 4, 1992 – September 11, 2003
- Nominated by: Rafael Hernández Colón
- Preceded by: Víctor Pons
- Succeeded by: Miriam Naveira

Associate Justice to the Supreme Court of Puerto Rico
- In office August 1990 – February 1992
- Nominated by: Rafael Hernández Colón
- Preceded by: Peter Ortiz Gustafson
- Succeeded by: Jaime Fuster

Personal details
- Born: September 18, 1937 Río Piedras, Puerto Rico
- Died: January 10, 2019 (aged 81) Tampa, Florida, U.S.
- Education: University of Puerto Rico (BSS); University of Puerto Rico School of Law (LL.M.)

José Antonio Andreu García (September 18, 1937 – January 10, 2019) was a Puerto Rican jurist who served as the 13th chief justice of the Supreme Court of Puerto Rico from 1992 to 2003. He was known for his moderate approach to constitutional law.

== Career and education ==
Andreu received his bachelor's degree in 1958 in economics from the University of Puerto Rico at Río Piedras and his law degree in 1961 from the University of Puerto Rico School of Law.

From 1963 to 1973 he held the position of District Judge, Assistant District Attorney, District Attorney and Superior Court Judge. After privately practicing law for 19 years, in 1990 Governor Rafael Hernández Colón appointed Andreu to fill a vacancy as Associate Justice in the Supreme Court of Puerto Rico. Eighteen months later he was elevated to the position of Chief Justice after the retirement of Chief Justice Víctor Pons.

Chief Justice Andreu had a brief dispute with Governor Pedro Rosselló in 1997 when Rosselló decided to have Associate Justice Baltasar Corrada del Río deliver the oath of office to him during his second inauguration. Andreu publicly said this break with tradition was unnecessary.

After eleven years at the helm of the court, Andreu decided to resign in 2003 during the governorship of Sila Calderón. Calderón initially appointed Secretary of State Ferdinand Mercado to succeed Andreu but he was rejected by the Senate. Eventually, Andreu was replaced by his colleague Associate Justice Miriam Naveira.

After his retirement from the court on 2003, Andreu returned to private practice. He died from lymphoma on January 10, 2019, at his home in Tampa, Florida, at age 81.

Legal offices
Preceded by Peter Ortiz Gustafson	Associate Justice of the Puerto Rico Supreme Court; 1990–1992	Succeeded by Jaime Fuster
Preceded by Víctor Pons	Chief Justice of the Puerto Rico Supreme Court; 1992–2003	Succeeded by Miriam Naveira
