= Efraín Rivera Pérez =

Puerto Rican judge (1951–2013)

Associate Justice of the Supreme Court of Puerto Rico
- In office July 13, 2000 – July 31, 2010
- Nominated by: Pedro Rosselló
- Preceded by: Antonio Negrón García
- Succeeded by: Edgardo Rivera García

Personal details
- Born: July 15, 1951 Mayagüez, Puerto Rico
- Died: September 15, 2013 (aged 62) Guaynabo, Puerto Rico
- Education: University of Puerto Rico at Mayagüez (BBA); Pontifical Catholic University of Puerto Rico School of Law (JD)

Efraín E. Rivera Pérez (July 15, 1951 – September 15, 2013) was a Puerto Rican jurist who served as an Associate Justice on the Supreme Court of Puerto Rico. He held the position from 2000 to 2010.

== Personal life ==
Born in Mayagüez, Puerto Rico, he earned his bachelor's degree in Business Administration from the University of Puerto Rico at Mayagüez, and in 1975, he acquired the degree of Juris Doctor from the Pontifical Catholic University of Puerto Rico School of Law in Ponce, Puerto Rico.

== Career ==
He began his career as a trial lawyer, and later became a trial lawyer. 1983, served as District Judge, appointed by then-Governor Carlos Romero Barceló. From 1983 to 1984 he served as a Judge District Court Administrator, Mayagüez Judicial Region

In 1993 Governor Pedro Rosselló hired him to be his Legal Advisor. He also served as Deputy Secretary of Justice.

In 2000 he was appointed to the Supreme Court by Governor Rosselló. He took the oath of office on July 13, 2000, after confirmation by the Senate. On June 2, 2010, he announced that he resigned his position, making the effective date of his resignation July 31, 2010. He was replaced by Appeals Court judge Edgardo Rivera García.

Two months later, Governor Luis Fortuño appointed him as a special monitor to oversee and make recommendations on the operations of the Puerto Rico Police Department, after over 60 of its agents were arrested following an FBI sting against police corruption.

== Death ==
Efraín Rivera Pérez died on September 15, 2013, in a motorcycle accident in Guaynabo, Puerto Rico. He was 62 years old.

Legal offices
Preceded by Antonio Negrón García	Associate Justice of the Supreme Court of Puerto Rico; 2000-2010	Succeeded by Edgardo Rivera García
