= Juan Pérez-Giménez =

U.S. federal judge in Puerto Rico

Senior Judge of the United States District Court for the District of Puerto Rico
- In office March 28, 2006 – December 10, 2020

Chief Judge of the United States District Court for the District of Puerto Rico
- In office 1984–1991
- Preceded by: Juan R. Torruella
- Succeeded by: Gilberto Gierbolini-Ortiz

Judge of the United States District Court for the District of Puerto Rico
- In office December 6, 1979 – March 28, 2006
- Appointed by: Jimmy Carter
- Preceded by: Seat established by 92 Stat. 1629
- Succeeded by: Francisco Besosa

Magistrate Judge of the United States District Court for the District of Puerto Rico
- In office 1975–1979

Personal details
- Born: Juan Manuel Pérez-Giménez; March 28, 1941 Río Piedras, Puerto Rico
- Died: December 10, 2020 (aged 79) Guaynabo, Puerto Rico
- Education: University of Puerto Rico (BA); University of Puerto Rico School of Law (LLB); George Washington University (MBA)

Juan Manuel Pérez-Giménez (March 28, 1941 – December 10, 2020) was a United States district judge of the United States District Court for the District of Puerto Rico.

== Education and career ==
Born in Río Piedras, San Juan, Puerto Rico, Pérez-Giménez attended Chaminade Preparatory School in St. Louis, Missouri, graduating in 1959. Received a Bachelor of Arts degree from the University of Puerto Rico in 1963, a Master of Business Administration from George Washington University in 1965, and a Bachelor of Laws from the University of Puerto Rico School of Law in 1968. He was in private practice in San Juan from 1968 to 1971, and was then an Assistant United States Attorney for the District of Puerto Rico from 1971 to 1975. He was a United States magistrate judge for the District of Puerto Rico from 1975 to 1979.

== Federal judicial service ==
On October 23, 1979, Pérez-Giménez was nominated by President Jimmy Carter to a new seat on the United States District Court for the District of Puerto Rico created by 92 Stat. 1629. He was confirmed by the United States Senate on December 5, 1979, and received his commission the following day. He served as Chief Judge from 1984 to 1991, and assumed senior status on March 28, 2006. Pérez-Giménez died on December 10, 2020, at the age of 79. He had just marked his 41st year as a district court judge on December 5, 2020.

== Controversial case ==
On October 21, 2014, Pérez-Giménez upheld Puerto Rico's ban on same-sex marriage, but the 1st Circuit sent the case back to the trial court after the Supreme Court's June 2015 ruling in Obergefell v. Hodges striking down marriage bans nationwide. The appeals court ordered Pérez-Giménez to "further consider" the matter "in light of Obergefell," adding that the appeals court judges "agree with the parties…that the ban is unconstitutional." Nonetheless, in March 2016, Pérez-Giménez upheld the ban for a second time, ruling that the Supreme Court's ruling does not apply to a territory like Puerto Rico. On April 7, 2016, the Court of Appeals overturned Pérez-Giménez' ruling in a caustic benchslap, stating that it "errs in so many respects that it is hard to know where to begin." The case was assigned to a different judge for final disposition.

== See also ==
- List of Hispanic and Latino American jurists

== Sources ==
Legal offices
Preceded by Seat established by 92 Stat. 1629	Judge of the United States District Court for the District of Puerto Rico; 1979–2006	Succeeded by Francisco Besosa
Preceded by Juan R. Torruella	Chief Judge of the United States District Court for the District of Puerto Rico; 1984–1991	Succeeded by Gilberto Gierbolini-Ortiz
