= Puerto Rico Office of Legislative Services =

Office providing service to Puerto Rico's legislature

The Office of Legislative Services of Puerto Rico was created on January 27, 1954 to provide research, translation, library and legislative drafting services to all members of the Puerto Rico Legislative Assembly. Its duties are similar to those of the Congressional Research Service.

The Office is headed by a Director, currently Juan Luis Martinez Martinez, appointed jointly by the President of the Senate and the Speaker of the House of Representatives. Two of the Office's directors, Carlos V. Dávila and Rafael Alonso-Alonso, have subsequently served as Associate Justices of the Puerto Rico Supreme Court. Another two, Nélida Jiménez-Velázquez and Teresa Medina Monteserrín, have moved on to the Puerto Rico Court of Appeals, and three have become Superior Court judges, including Juan R. Melecio-Machuca, Carlos García-Jaunarena and Elba Rosa Rodríguez-Fuentes.

It is physically located in the Antonio R. Barceló Legislative Building, formerly known as the Tropical Medicine Building. The Office has 16 divisions, 11 of which provide direct services to the Legislative Assembly, as well as to the general public: the Legislative Library, Translations, Digitalization, Information Systems, Senate and House Committee Archives, FBI Archives, Legislative Research, Proof Reading and Processing, Capitol Tourism, Internship Programs, Puerto Rico's Historian, Document Administration, Human Capital, Procurement and General Services, Budget and Finances, and the Capitol Infirmary. Its budget currently exceeds $11 million annually and supports a staff of about 115 attorneys, economists, translators, librarians, technicians, tour guides, doctors, nurses and support staff.

The Office operates the Tomás Bonilla Feliciano Legislative Library and provides support to several internship programs, including the Córdova Congressional Internship Program, the Jorge Alberto Ramos Comas Legislative Internship Program and the Pilar Barbosa Federal Internship Program for Teachers as well as the office of the Official Historian of Puerto Rico. Its Translations Division provides the official translations to English of all Puerto Rico laws and regulations.

The Office is currently digitalizing and placing online hundreds of thousands of documents generated by Puerto Rico's Legislative Assembly over the past century and is the repository of the Legislature's archives of Federal Bureau of Investigation (FBI) files on political surveillance in Puerto Rico resulting from a May 2000 agreement between then FBI Director Louis Freeh, Congressman José E. Serrano and then Senate Federal Affairs Committee chairman Kenneth McClintock, Puerto Rico's current Senate president.

The Office's website, has become an important legal, legislative and historical research tool.

== Directors of the Office ==
- Carlos V. Dávila (1954-1961)
- Alberto Ferrer-Rincón (1961-1965)
- Rafael Alonso-Alonso (1965-1969)
- Rafael Morán Loubriel (1970-1972)
- Sigfredo Vélez-González (1973-1976)
- Sila Suárez de Vázquez (1977-1980)
- Juan R. Melecio-Machuca (1981-1988)
- Carlos García-Jaunarena (1988-1993)
- Nélida Jiménez-Velázquez (1993-1995)
- Teresa Medina Monteserrín (1995-1996)
- José A. Figueroa-Lugo (1996-1999)
- Luis G. Hidalgo-Ramírez (1999-2000)
- Rolando Quevedo Motta (2001-2002)
- Elba Rosa Rodríguez-Fuentes (2002-2004)
- Luis E. Fusté-Lacourt (2005)
- Francisco Domenech (2005-2008)
- Solange I. De Lahongrais Taylor (2009–2013)
- Juan Luis Martínez Martínez (2013-present)
