= Sifre (surname) =

Sifre is a surname. Notable people with the surname include:

- Jaime Sifre Dávila (1887–1960), Puerto Rican judge
- Marlese Sifre, Puerto Rican lawyer and politician
- Job Sifre, Dutch DJ from The Netherlands
- Kristian Sifre, Puerto Rican Musician from Brooklyn NY. Owner of Innovista Photography in North Carolina.
