= Judge Hernandez =

Judge Hernandez may refer to:

- Marco A. Hernandez (born 1957), judge of the United States District Court for the District of Oregon
- Pedro Delgado Hernández (born 1956), judge of the United States District Court for the District of Puerto Rico
