= Peter Ortiz Gustafson =

Puerto Rican judge (1934–2016)

Peter Ortiz Gustafson (May 9, 1934, in San Juan, Puerto Rico – August 18, 2016, in San Juan, Puerto Rico) was an associate justice of the Supreme Court of Puerto Rico. Appointed by Puerto Rico Governor Rafael Hernandez Colon on May 31, 1985, until voluntarily resigning on April 30, 1990. Prior to his appointment, he had been a Superior Court judge for many years.

After his resignation in 1990, he was succeeded as associate justice by José Andreu García, who in 1992 went on to become Chief Justice. His last reported public statement was in 2009 when he opposed the Puerto Rico Supreme Court's request to the Legislature to increase its membership from 7 to 9.

Peter Ortiz Gustafson died on August 18, 2016, in San Juan, Puerto Rico at age 84.

== Sources ==
- La Justicia en sus Manos, Luis Rafael Rivera, ISBN 1-57581-884-1

Legal offices
Preceded by José Conrado Hernández	Associate Justice of the Supreme Court of Puerto Rico; 1985–1990	Succeeded by José Andreu García
