= Juan R. Melecio Machuca =

Puerto Rican politician (1934–2022)

Director of the Puerto Rico Office of Legislative Services
- In office 1981–1988

Chairman of the Puerto Rico State Elections Commission

Personal details
- Born: Juan Ramón Melecio Machuca; May 29, 1934 Vega Alta, Puerto Rico
- Died: February 9, 2022 (aged 87)
- Education: Interamerican University of Puerto Rico at San Germán (BA); New York University (MBA); Interamerican University of Puerto Rico School of Law (JD)
- Occupation: Lawyer, Judge

Military service
- Allegiance: United States of America
- Branch/service: United States Army
- Rank: Specialist 3rd class

Juan Ramón Melecio Machuca (May 29, 1934 – February 9, 2022) was a Puerto Rican lawyer who was the longest-serving director of the Office of Legislative Services of Puerto Rico, from 1981 to 1988. He was subsequently appointed a Superior Court judge by Governor Rafael Hernández Colón.

== Early life and education ==
Melecio was born on May 29, 1934, in Vega Alta, Puerto Rico and raised by his paternal grandmother. He moved to the United States where he worked in factories in New York and New Jersey. Served in the United States Army stationed in Okinawa. He completed a Bachelor of Arts degree at the Interamerican University of Puerto Rico San Germán campus with studies in political science, economics, and religion. He subsequently completed a master's degree in business administration with a concentration in international trade from New York University. In 1971 he earned a juris doctor from the University of Puerto Rico School of Law.

== Political career ==
In the 1990s he was nominated as a tri-partisan consensus candidate to serve as chairman of the Puerto Rico State Elections Commission.

A former member of the pro-status quo Popular Democratic Party, he surprised political observers in 2003 when he announced his conversion as a statehooder and accepted an invitation to serve as the chairman of former governor Pedro Rosselló's 2004 campaign to return to the governor's mansion, La Fortaleza, for a third non-consecutive term.

He served as senior advisor to the gubernatorial campaign of former resident commissioner Luis Fortuño, who was Rosselló's successful running mate when the former governor lost in 2004, and was subsequently appointed by Governor Fortuño to head Puerto Rico's Trade Office in the Dominican Republic.

He was one of a handful of politicians who served in all three branches of the Government of Puerto Rico, the Legislative, Judicial and Executive branches.

== Death ==
He died on February 9, 2022, at the age of 87. Was inserted at the Puerto Rico National Cemetery in Bayamón, Puerto Rico.

== Legacy ==
The Puerto Rico State Elections Commission building in San Juan, Puerto Rico was named Juan R. Melecio.
