= Judge Rives =

Judge Rives may refer to:

- Alexander Rives (1806–1885), judge of the United States District Court for the Western District of Virginia
- Jack L. Rives (born 1952), judge at the U.S. Air Force Court of Military Review
- Richard Rives (1895–1982), judge of the United States Court of Appeals for the Fifth Circuit

== See also ==
- Rives Kistler (born 1949), justice of the Oregon Supreme Court
- Camille L. Vélez-Rivé (born 1968), judge of the United States District Court for the District of Puerto Rico
