= Camille Vélez-Rivé =

Puerto Rican judge (born 1968)

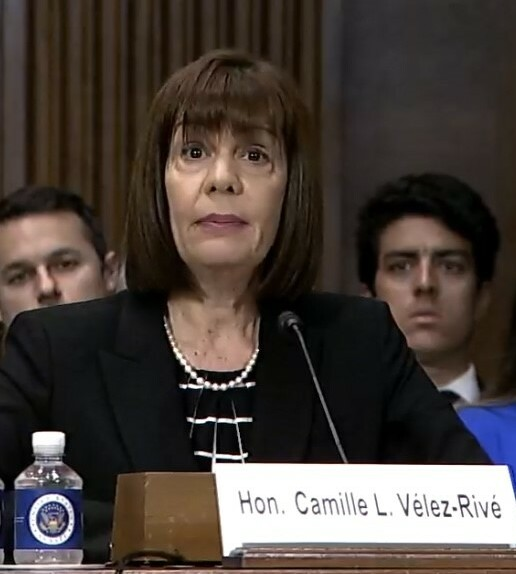

Judge of the United States District Court for the District of Puerto Rico
- Incumbent
- Assumed office December 9, 2022
- Appointed by: Joe Biden
- Preceded by: Francisco Besosa

Magistrate Judge of the United States District Court for the District of Puerto Rico
- In office 2004 – December 9, 2022

Personal details
- Born: Camille Lizette Vélez-Rivé; 1968 (age 57–58) San Juan, Puerto Rico
- Education: Washington University in St. Louis (BA); University of Puerto Rico School of Law (JD)

Camille Lizette Vélez-Rivé (born 1968) is a United States district judge of the United States District Court for the District of Puerto Rico. She previously served as a United States magistrate judge of the same court from 2004 to 2022.

== Early life and education ==
Vélez-Rivé was born in 1968, in San Juan, Puerto Rico. Vélez-Rivé graduated from the Academia del Perpetuo Socorro. She received a Bachelor of Arts from Washington University in St. Louis in 1989 and a Juris Doctor, magna cum laude, from the University of Puerto Rico Law School in 1993.

== Career ==
Vélez-Rivé served as a law clerk for Justice Francisco Rebollo López of the Puerto Rico Supreme Court from 1993 to 1994. From 1994 to 1997, she was an associate at Pietrantoni Méndez & Alvarez in San Juan, Puerto Rico. From 1998 to 2004, she was an assistant United States attorney in the United States Attorney's Office for the District of Puerto Rico.

=== Federal judicial service ===
Vélez-Rivé served as a United States magistrate judge for the District of Puerto Rico from 2004 to 2022.

On June 15, 2022, President Joe Biden nominated Vélez-Rivé to serve as a United States district judge of the United States District Court for the District of Puerto Rico. President Biden nominated Vélez-Rivé to the seat vacated by Judge Francisco Besosa, who assumed senior status on January 1, 2022. On July 13, 2022, a hearing on her nomination was held before the Senate Judiciary Committee. On August 4, 2022, her nomination was reported out of committee by a 14–8 vote. On November 30, 2022, the United States Senate invoked cloture on her nomination by a 54–43 vote. Later that day, her nomination was confirmed by a 55–42 vote. She received her judicial commission on December 9, 2022, and was sworn in on the same day.

== See also ==
- List of Hispanic and Latino American jurists

Legal offices
Preceded by Francisco Besosa	Judge of the United States District Court for the District of Puerto Rico; 2022–present	Incumbent
