= Carlos Santana Becerra =

Puerto Rican judge (1908–1971)

Associate Justice of the Supreme Court of Puerto Rico
- In office 1957 – February 15, 1971
- Nominated by: Luis Muñoz Marín
- Preceded by: Jaime Sifre Dávila
- Succeeded by: Ángel Martín Taboas

Personal details
- Born: 1908 Manatí, Puerto Rico
- Died: March 11, 1971 (aged 62) San Juan, Puerto Rico
- Resting place: Santa María Magdalena de Pazzis Cemetery
- Education: University of Puerto Rico (BA); University of Puerto Rico School of Law (JD)
- Occupation: Lawyer, judge

Military service
- Allegiance: United States
- Branch/service: United States Army
- Battles/wars: World War II

Carlos Santana Becerra (1908 – March 11, 1971) served for over 13 years as an Associate Justice of the Puerto Rico Supreme Court.

Born in Manatí, Puerto Rico, he obtained his bachelor's degree and law degrees at the University of Puerto Rico. While a student, he was active in student politics.

Admitted to the bar in 1934, he served in various public offices, before joining the United States Army in 1943 during World War II. After his honorable discharge, he continued serving in government, including the Solicitor General's office as well as a Superior Court Judge from 1952 to 1957, when Governor Luis Muñoz Marín appointed him to the Supreme Court.

He retired on February 15, 1971, at the age of 62, shortly before his death in San Juan, Puerto Rico on March 11. He was buried at Santa María Magdalena de Pazzis Cemetery in San Juan, Puerto Rico. His vacancy was filled by Associate Justice Ángel Martín Taboas.

== Sources ==
- La Justicia en sus Manos by Luis Rafael Rivera, ISBN 1-57581-884-1

Legal offices
Preceded by Jaime Sifre Dávila	Associate Justice to the Supreme Court of Puerto Rico; 1957–1971	Succeeded by Ángel Martín Taboas
