= Luis Muñoz Rivera (senator) =

Puerto Rican politician

Member of the Puerto Rico Senate
- In office 1965–1968

Personal details
- Born: April 10, 1916 Cayey, Puerto Rico
- Died: October 6, 2006 (aged 90) San Juan, Puerto Rico
- Party: Popular Democratic Party (PPD)
- Education: Syracuse University (MPA); University of Puerto Rico School of Law (JD)
- Occupation: Politician, Senator

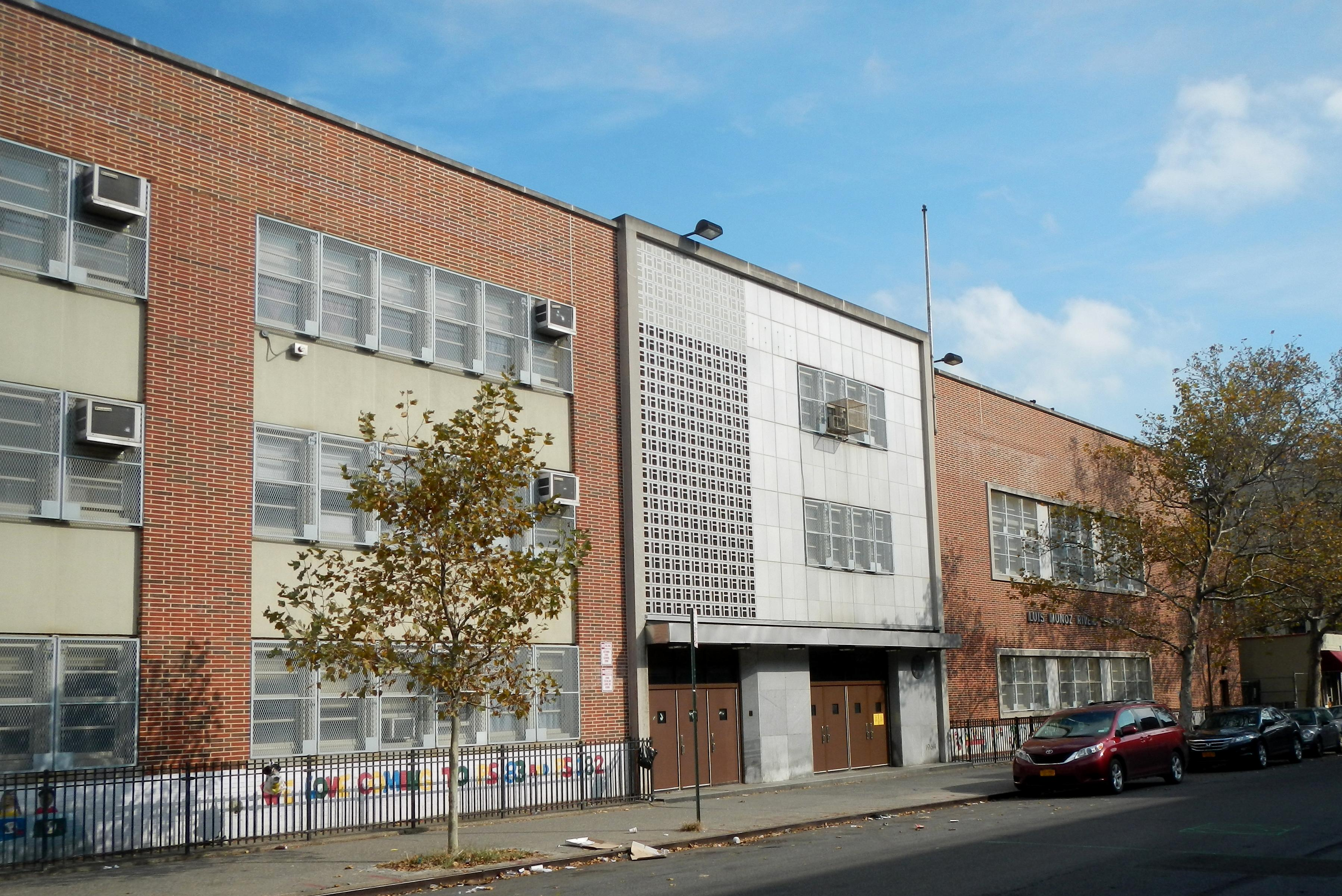
Luis Muñoz Rivera School in Harlem

Luis Muñoz Rivera (April 10, 1916 – October 6, 2006) was a senator of Puerto Rico and the last surviving delegate of Puerto Rico's Constitutional Convention, which met in 1951 and 1952.

== Education ==
He graduated from the University of Puerto Rico School of Law; he was a lawyer-notary. He completed a master's degree in Public Administration from Syracuse University.

== Public life ==
Muñoz Rivera entered public life as San Juan Mayor Felisa Rincón's right-hand man, serving as her Special Assistant, Auditor and Budget Director for the City of San Juan.

Elected on the Popular Democratic Party of Puerto Rico slate of delegates to Puerto Rico's Constitutional Convention, he participated actively in the drafting of the Constitution of the Commonwealth of Puerto Rico between 1951 and 1952. Subsequently, as an attorney, he was looked upon as an important source of guidance for constitutional interpretation.

He served as a member of the Senate of Puerto Rico from 1965 to 1968.

In his later years, he served as a member of the Puerto Rico Civil Rights Commission and in 2005 was appointed president emeritus by Governor Aníbal Acevedo Vilá.

Upon his death, flags were flown half-staff in Puerto Rico. The Governor, Senate President Kenneth McClintock and House Speaker José Aponte authorized a state funeral upon his death in 2006, the highest honor that Puerto Rico bestows upon its most notable citizens.

== Death ==
He died on September 29, 2006, at the age of 90 in a hospital in San Juan, Puerto Rico. Governor Acevedo Vilá, Senate President Kenneth McClintock, and House Speaker José Aponte authorized a state funeral following his death in 2006, the highest honor that the government of Puerto Rico grants to its most notable citizens.
