= Gilberto Gierbolini-Ortiz =

U.S. federal judge in Puerto Rico

Senior Judge of the United States District Court for the District of Puerto Rico
- In office December 27, 1993 – March 23, 2004

Chief Judge of the United States District Court for the District of Puerto Rico
- In office 1991–1993
- Preceded by: Juan Pérez-Giménez
- Succeeded by: Carmen Consuelo Cerezo

Judge of the United States District Court for the District of Puerto Rico
- In office February 20, 1980 – December 27, 1993
- Appointed by: Jimmy Carter
- Preceded by: Seat established by 92 Stat. 1629
- Succeeded by: Daniel R. Domínguez

Solicitor General of Puerto Rico
- In office 1969–1972
- Nominated by: Luis A. Ferré
- Preceded by: Rafael Rivera Cruz
- Succeeded by: Miriam Naveira

Personal details
- Born: Gilberto Gierbolini-Ortiz; December 22, 1926 Coamo, Puerto Rico
- Died: December 29, 2009 (aged 83)
- Education: University of Puerto Rico (BA, LLB)

Gilberto Gierbolini-Ortiz (December 22, 1926 – December 29, 2009) was a United States district judge of the United States District Court for the District of Puerto Rico.

== Education and career ==
Born in Coamo, Puerto Rico, Gierbolini-Ortiz was a sergeant in the United States Army during World War II, from 1943 to 1946, and was later a captain in the Army from 1951 to 1957, and served in Korea. He received a Bachelor of Arts degree from the University of Puerto Rico in 1957 and a Bachelor of Laws from the University of Puerto Rico School of Law in 1961. He was an Assistant United States Attorney for the Commonwealth of Puerto Rico from 1961 to 1966, and was then a judge on the Superior Court for the Commonwealth of Puerto Rico from 1966 to 1969. He was an assistant secretary of justice and commonwealth solicitor general of Puerto Rico from 1969 to 1972, also serving as an assistant commonwealth attorney general for antitrust 1970 to 1972. In 1972, he was Chairman of the State Elections Board for the Commonwealth of Puerto Rico. He was in private practice in Puerto Rico from 1973 to 1980.

== Federal judicial service ==
On November 30, 1979, Gierbolini-Ortiz was nominated by President Jimmy Carter to a new seat on the United States District Court for the District of Puerto Rico created by 92 Stat. 1629. He was confirmed by the United States Senate on February 20, 1980, and received his commission the same day. He served as Chief Judge from 1991 to 1993, assuming senior status on December 27, 1993. Gierbolini-Ortiz served in that capacity until his retirement, on March 23, 2004.

== Death ==
Gierbolini-Ortiz died in his sleep on December 29, 2009, at the age of 83. He was interred at the Puerto Rico National Cemetery in Bayamón, Puerto Rico.

== See also ==
- List of Hispanic and Latino American jurists

== Sources ==
Legal offices
Preceded by Seat established by 92 Stat. 1629	Judge of the United States District Court for the District of Puerto Rico; 1980–1993	Succeeded by Daniel R. Domínguez
Preceded by Juan Pérez-Giménez	Chief Judge of the United States District Court for the District of Puerto Rico; 1991–1993	Succeeded by Carmen Consuelo Cerezo
