= Rafael Alonso Alonso =

Puerto Rico Supreme Court justice (1939–2022)

Associate Justice of the Supreme Court of Puerto Rico
- In office May 6, 1985 – July 14, 1995
- Appointed by: Rafael Hernández Colón
- Succeeded by: Baltasar Corrada del Río

Director of the Puerto Rico Office of Legislative Services
- In office 1965–1969

Personal details
- Born: September 9, 1939 San Juan, Puerto Rico
- Died: June 10, 2022 (aged 82) Ponce, Puerto Rico
- Education: University of Puerto Rico (BA); University of Puerto Rico School of Law (JD)
- Occupation: Judge

Rafael Alonso-Alonso (September 9, 1939 San Juan, Puerto Rico – June 10, 2022 Ponce, Puerto Rico) was a former Associate Justice of the Puerto Rico Supreme Court.

Rafael Alonso Alonso was a Cum Laude graduate of the University of Puerto Rico earning a Bachelor of Arts and obtained his J.D. Cum Laude from the University of Puerto Rico Law School. Graduated from the Institute of Judicial Administration of the New York Law School.

Prior to being appointed to the bench by Governor Rafael Hernández Colón, he served as director of the Office of Legislative Services of Puerto Rico from 1965 to 1968, as director of UPR's Graduate School of Public Administration from 1969 to 1972, and as president of the Puerto Rico Planning Board from 1973 to 1976.

He served as Associate Justice from May 6, 1985, until his retirement from the court on July 14, 1995.

Alonso died on June 10, 2022.

Preceded by	Associate Justice to the Supreme Court of Puerto Rico; 1985-95	Succeeded by Baltasar Corrada del Río
