= Luis Blanco Lugo =

Puerto Rican judge

Associate Justice of the Supreme Court of Puerto Rico
- In office 1961–1970
- Appointed by: Luis Muñoz Marín
- Preceded by: Lino Saldaña Amadeo
- Succeeded by: Héctor Martínez Muñoz

Personal details
- Born: November 20, 1921 Fajardo, Puerto Rico
- Died: October 28, 1973 (aged 51) San Juan, Puerto Rico
- Education: University of Puerto Rico (BA); University of Puerto Rico School of Law (JD)

Luis Felix Blanco Lugo (November 20, 1921 – October 28, 1973) was a judge who served as an associate justice on the Supreme Court of Puerto Rico from 1961 until 1970.

== Life ==
Born in Fajardo, Puerto Rico, Lugo completed his baccalaureate at the University of Puerto Rico in 1939 and began studying law at the University of Puerto Rico School of Law from 1939 to 1942.

He was the editor of Revista Jurídica (Law Review) during the academic year 1940-1941 and in his last year at the Faculty of Law 1941-1942 he held the chair of Chancellor of the Alpha chapter of the Phi Eta Mu fraternity. After obtaining his law degree, Lugo was a legal official for Chief Justice of the Puerto Rico Supreme Court Emilio del Toro Cuebas and Associate Justice A. Cecil Snyder.

In 1961 he was appointed Associate Justice of the Supreme Court of Puerto Rico by Governor Luis Muñoz Marín.

Luis Blanco Lugo passed away on October 28, 1973, in San Juan, Puerto Rico, at age 51.

== Sources ==
- La Justicia en sus Manos by Luis Rafael Rivera, ISBN 1-57581-884-1

Legal offices
Preceded by Lino Saldaña Amadeo	Associate Justice to the Supreme Court of Puerto Rico; 1961-1970	Succeeded by Héctor Martínez Muñoz
