= Luis Blanco =

Luis Blanco may refer to:

- Luis Blanco Lugo (1921–1973), Puerto Rican judge
- Luis Carrero Blanco (1904–1973), Spanish Navy officer and politician
- Luis Manuel Blanco (born 1953), Argentine football manager of Mons Calpe and former forward
- Luis Blanco (footballer, born 1978), Spanish football manager of Espanyol and former forward
- Luis Blanco (footballer, born 1990), Andorran football midfielder for Santa Coloma
