= Raúl Candelario López =

Puerto Rican judge (born 1974)

Associate Justice of the Supreme Court of Puerto Rico
- Incumbent
- Assumed office January 16, 2025
- Appointed by: Jenniffer González-Colón
- Preceded by: Edgardo Rivera García

Personal details
- Born: Raúl Arnaldo Candelario López San Juan, Puerto Rico
- Education: Pontifical Catholic University of Puerto Rico (BA, JD)

Raúl Arnaldo Candelario López is a Puerto Rican jurist. Since 2025 he has served as an associate justice of the Supreme Court of Puerto Rico.

== Early life and education ==
Judge Candelario López completed his secondary education at Colegio Ponceño. In 1988, he obtained a Bachelor of Arts and Social Sciences degree, with a concentration in Political Science and Public Administration, from the Pontifical Catholic University of Puerto Rico and earned his law degree in 1992 at the Pontifical Catholic University of Puerto Rico School of Law. During his university studies, he was recognized with the distinctions “Who’s Who Among Students in American Universities and Colleges” and the prestigious award “The Judge Alex H. Hotchkiss Award”. He is also a member of the Phi Eta Mu fraternity.

== Career ==
In the practice of law, Judge Candelario López began his career in the Puerto Rico House of Representatives, where he was assigned to various legislative committees, actively participating in the development of social impact legislation that remains in effect.

Two years later, he was appointed by the then Governor of Puerto Rico, Hon. Pedro Rosselló González, and confirmed by the Senate, as Assistant Prosecutor I of the Department of Justice. Later, he was promoted to Assistant Prosecutor II, a position he held for more than a decade. During his career at the Public Prosecutor's Office, he was assigned to the Bayamón District Prosecutor's Office, as well as to the divisions of Public Integrity, Comptroller Affairs, Domestic Violence, Child Abuse, and Sexual Offenses. Subsequently, he practiced private law and notary work at the firm Santiago, Umpierre & Arroyo.

In 2019 he was appointed as a Superior Judge of the Court of First Instance. On January 16, 2025, he was appointed by the Governor of Puerto Rico, Jenniffer González Colón, as Associate Justice of the Supreme Court of Puerto Rico.

Legal offices
Preceded by Edgardo Rivera García	Associate Justice of the Puerto Rico Supreme Court; 2025–present	Incumbent
