= Angel Colón-Pérez =

Puerto Rican judge (born 1977)

Associate Justice of the Supreme Court of Puerto Rico
- Incumbent
- Assumed office August 31, 2016
- Appointed by: Alejandro García Padilla
- Preceded by: Maite Oronoz Rodríguez

Personal details
- Born: 1977 (age 48–49) Aibonito, Puerto Rico
- Education: University of Puerto Rico, Río Piedras (BBA); Interamerican University of Puerto Rico School of Law (JD)

Angel Colón-Pérez (born 1977) is an associate justice of the Supreme Court of Puerto Rico whose nomination was announced by Governor Alejandro García Padilla on April 8, 2016.

Born in Aibonito, he studied at the José Gándara High School in his hometown. He has a Bachelor of Business Administration from the University of Puerto Rico, Río Piedras Campus and is a graduate of the Interamerican University of Puerto Rico School of Law, where he was an editor of its law review. He subsequently served as a law clerk to then-Associate Justice Miriam Naveira. Afterwards, he worked for Chief Justice Federico Hernández Denton, who upon Colón-Pérez' appointment as a Superior Court judge, never assigned him a courtroom in order to keep him as his chief of staff in the Supreme Court. He also served as executive director of the Bar Exam Committee. For several years he was an adjunct professor at Interamerican Law School. In 2013, Governor García Padilla appointed him as his chief legal and legislative counsel until his nomination to the High Court.

At his confirmation hearing on June 22, 2016 at the Senate of Puerto Rico he was praised by the Judiciary Committee Chairman, Senator Miguel Pereira Castillo, Senate President Eduardo Bhatia and Minority Leader Larry Seilhamer. He was confirmed by the Senate on June 28, 2016. He was sworn in on August 31, 2016.

Legal offices
Preceded by Maite Oronoz Rodríguez	Associate Justice of the Supreme Court of Puerto Rico; 2016–present	Incumbent
