= Camille Rivera Pérez =

Puerto Rican judge (born 1974)

Associate Justice of the Supreme Court of Puerto Rico
- Incumbent
- Assumed office January 16, 2025
- Appointed by: Jenniffer González-Colón
- Preceded by: Anabelle Rodríguez

Judge of the Puerto Rico Court of Appeals
- In office 2022–2025
- Appointed by: Pedro Pierluisi

Personal details
- Born: December 3, 1974 (age 51) Mayagüez, Puerto Rico
- Education: University of Puerto Rico at Mayagüez (BBA); Pontifical Catholic University of Puerto Rico School of Law (JD)

Camille Rivera Pérez (born December 3, 1974) is a Puerto Rican jurist. Since 2025 she has served as an associate justice of the Supreme Court of Puerto Rico.

== Early life and education ==
Judge Camille Rivera Pérez was born on December 3, 1974, in Mayagüez, Puerto Rico, and was raised in the municipality of Las Marías, Puerto Rico. He earned a bachelor's degree in Business Administration with a concentration in Accounting, cum laude, from the University of Puerto Rico at Mayagüez. In 2000, she completed the Juris Doctor degree, also cum laude, at the Pontifical Catholic University of Puerto Rico School of Law.

== Career ==
She began her professional career as a legal officer at the Puerto Rico Court of Appeals, where she discovered her vocation for the judiciary under the guidance of distinguished judges. Subsequently, she worked in the Puerto Rico House of Representatives, where she served as legal advisor and executive director of the Committee on Government, Federal and Veteran Affairs, and later as Director of the Office of Legal Advisors during the presidency of Jenniffer González-Colón.

In 2010, she was appointed superior judge by Governor Luis Fortuño, and assigned to the Judicial Region of Fajardo. In 2018 she was appointed administrative judge of the Judicial Region of Fajardo. In 2022, she was appointed judge of the court of appeals by Governor Pedro Pierluisi. On January 16, 2025, she was appointed associate justice of the Supreme Court of Puerto Rico by Governor Jenniffer González-Colón.

Legal offices
Preceded by Anabelle Rodríguez	Associate Justice of the Puerto Rico Supreme Court; 2025–present	Incumbent
