= Rafael Hernández Matos =

Puerto Rican jurist

Associate Justice of the Supreme Court of Puerto Rico
- In office 1957–1972
- Appointed by: Luis Muñoz Marín
- Preceded by: Luis Negrón Fernández
- Succeeded by: Armindo Cadilla

Personal details
- Born: Rafael Hernández Matos Cardoza; October 24, 1902 Cabo Rojo, Puerto Rico
- Died: June 7, 1996 (aged 93) Ponce, Puerto Rico
- Education: University of Puerto Rico School of Law (JD)
- Occupation: Lawyer, judge

Rafael Hernández Matos Cardoza (October 24, 1902 – June 7, 1996) served as Associate Justice of the Puerto Rico Supreme Court.

Born in Cabo Rojo, Puerto Rico Rafael Hernández Matos was a graduate from the University of Puerto Rico School of Law, in 1926 opened his law office in Ponce, Puerto Rico. was married to Dora Colón Clavell, public servant and first woman candidate for mayor of the city of Ponce. They had 3 sons, one of them is former Governor of Puerto Rico Rafael Hernández Colón. Was appointed associate justice of the Puerto Rico Supreme Court appointed by Puerto Rico Governor Luis Muñoz Marín. Held that position until his retirement in 1972. He returned to law practice in Ponce.

He died on June 7, 1996, in Ponce, Puerto Rico, at the age of 93.

== Sources ==
- La Justicia en sus Manos by Luis Rafael Rivera, ISBN 1-57581-884-1

Legal offices
Preceded by Luis Negrón Fernández	Associate Justice to the Supreme Court of Puerto Rico; 1957-1972	Succeeded by Armindo Cadilla
