= Manuel Rodríguez Ramos =

Puerto Rican academic (1908–??)

Manuel Rodríguez Ramos (born January 1, 1908, date of death unknown) was a Puerto Rican writer and law professor.

== Early life and education ==
He born on January 1, 1908, in Río Piedras, Puerto Rico. His father died when he was barely a year old. In 1930 he became the third president of Phi Sigma Alpha fraternity. In 1931 he and y Manuel García Cabrera with the help of the UPR Law School Dean Rafael Martínez Álvarez founded the UPR Law Review. Also as a student he was the director of Athenea the UPR graduating class Yearbook in 1930 and in 1932. He obtained his Juris Doctor from the University of Puerto Rico School of Law and later obtained his Master of Law from Tulane University Law School.

== Career ==
From 1932 to 1938 he worked as a private lawyer. Afterward he began working as part of the corp of lawyer of the Puerto Rico Secretary of Justice. From 1941 till 1943 he was Sub-secretary of Justice of Puerto Rico and in 1944 he was interim Secretary of Justice of Puerto Rico.

In the late 1940 he was appointed Dean of the University of Puerto Rico school of law, at that time it was called the College of Law.

Being dean of the School of Law the "Clínica de Asistencia Jurídica" or the Legal clinic was founded. Also during his tenure as Dean the nocturnal session began. He obtained form the University Administration, whose Chancellor was Jaime Benitez, the construction of a building for the School of Law, it was designed by Henry Klumb. After retiring as Dean he continued teaching at the school and was one of two professors at the school to have the title of Decano Emérito.

== Selected writings ==
- Breve historia de los Códigos Puertorriqueños
- Casos para el estudio de los derechos reales
- Andanzas y recuerdos de un abogado
- Casos y notas de derecho tributario puertorriqueño
- Visión de conjunto del derecho de América Latina
- Interaction of civil law and Anglo-American law in the legal method in Puerto Rico
- Nuestro Código penal vigente y el anteproyecto de reforma de 1926
- In rem actions in Puerto Rico
- En torno de la facultad impositiva de los municipios en Puerto Rico
- A glimpse at Latin American law
- "Equity" in the civil law:a comparative essay

== See also ==
- List of Puerto Ricans

Academic offices
Preceded by Rafael Martínez Álvarez	Dean of the University of Puerto Rico School of Law; 1940–1960	Succeeded by David Helfeld
Legal offices
Preceded by Salvador Mestre	Attorney General of Puerto Rico (Acting); 1943-1944	Succeeded by George C. Butte
