= Víctor Pons =

Puerto Rican judge

Chief Justice of the Supreme Court of Puerto Rico
- In office 1985–1992
- Nominated by: Rafael Hernández Colón
- Preceded by: José Trías Monge
- Succeeded by: José Andreu García

Secretary of State of Puerto Rico
- In office 1973–1974
- Nominated by: Rafael Hernández Colón
- Preceded by: Carlos Fernando Chardón
- Succeeded by: Juan A. Albors

Personal details
- Born: April 5, 1935 Río Piedras, Puerto Rico
- Died: November 11, 1999 (aged 64)
- Education: University of Puerto Rico (BA); University of Puerto Rico School of Law (LL.B.)

Víctor Manuel Pons Núñez (April 5, 1935 – November 11, 1999) served as the 12th chief justice of the Supreme Court of Puerto Rico. He previously had served as Secretary of State of Puerto Rico from 1973 until 1974.

Born in Rio Piedras, Puerto Rico, Pons earned a juris doctor in 1959 from the University of Puerto Rico School of Law. Started private law practice in 1959. He was appointed Chief Justice by Governor Rafael Hernández Colón in 1985, and he headed the high court until his retirement in 1992.

A prominent private-sector attorney, Pons was Hernández Colón's electoral campaign manager before holding public office. He died on November 11, 1999, at 64 years of age.

== Sources ==
- La Justicia en sus Manos, by Luis Rafael Rivera, 2007, ISBN 1-57581-884-1

Political offices
| Preceded by Carlos Fernando Chardón | Secretary of State of Puerto Rico; 1973–1974 | Succeeded by Juan A. Albors |
Legal offices
| Preceded by José Trías Monge | Chief Justice of the Puerto Rico Supreme Court; 1985–1992 | Succeeded by José Andreu García |
