= Daniel R. Domínguez =

Puerto Rican judge (born 1945)

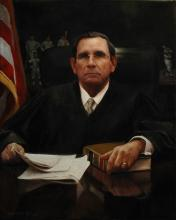

Senior Judge of the United States District Court for the District of Puerto Rico
- In office July 31, 2011 – January 2, 2024

Judge of the United States District Court for the District of Puerto Rico
- In office September 29, 1994 – July 31, 2011
- Appointed by: Bill Clinton
- Preceded by: Gilberto Gierbolini-Ortiz
- Succeeded by: Pedro Delgado Hernández

Personal details
- Born: July 2, 1945 (age 81) San Juan, Puerto Rico
- Education: Boston University (BA); University of Puerto Rico Law School (LLB)

Daniel R. Domínguez Hernández (born July 2, 1945) is a former United States district judge of the United States District Court for the District of Puerto Rico.

== Education and career ==
Born in San Juan, Puerto Rico, Domínguez received a Bachelor of Arts degree from Boston University in 1967 and a Bachelor of Laws from the University of Puerto Rico Law School in 1970. He was in the United States Army Reserve in 1967. He was in private practice in Hato Rey, Puerto Rico from 1970 to 1994.

=== Federal judicial service ===
On June 21, 1994, Domínguez was nominated by President Bill Clinton to a seat on the United States District Court for the District of Puerto Rico vacated by Judge Gilberto Gierbolini-Ortiz. Domínguez was confirmed by the United States Senate on September 28, 1994, and received his commission on September 29, 1994. He assumed senior status on July 31, 2011. Domínguez retired from active service on January 2, 2024.

== See also ==
- List of Hispanic and Latino American jurists

Legal offices
Preceded by Gilberto Gierbolini-Ortiz	Judge of the United States District Court for the District of Puerto Rico; 1994–2011	Succeeded by Pedro Delgado Hernández
