= Angel G. Hermida =

Former Superior Court Judge of the Commonwealth of PR

Judge of the Superior Court of the Commonwealth of Puerto Rico
- In office 1976–1997

Personal details
- Born: 1941 (age 84–85) Aguadilla, Puerto Rico
- Education: University of Notre Dame (BS); Duke University; University of Puerto Rico School of Law (J.D.); Harvard Law School (LL.M.)
- Occupation: Former Judge, Lawyer, Professor and Lecturer

Angel. G. Hermida-Nadal was born in Aguadilla, Puerto Rico in 1941 to Angel Hermida-Méndez and Teresa Nadal-Grau. His father was a private practice lawyer and his mother, who was also known as Madame Hermida or Baby Hermida, was a professor of French and Spanish at the University of Puerto Rico at Mayagüez. Hermida is a Puerto Rican jurist and formerly a Superior Court Judge of the Commonwealth of Puerto Rico. Hermida was born in Aguadilla, Puerto Rico and is known as the author of a judicial decision (MIRIAM J. RAMÍREZ DE FERRER Recurrente Vs. Juan Mari Bras, 4 October 1996) which recognizes the nature of Puerto Rican citizenship under the Constitution of Puerto Rico and decides that citizens of Puerto Rico have a right to vote in Puerto Rican elections, whether or not they are citizens of the United States.

== Biography ==
=== Education ===
Hermida obtained a Bachelor of Science in Physics (1963), cum laude from the University of Notre Dame with a General Motors National Scholarship. He received a National Aeronautics and Space Administration Fellowship for graduate studies in Physics at Duke University from 1963 to 1964. He then taught physics at the Mayagüez Campus of the University of Puerto Rico from 1964 to 1966. He obtained his law degree, magna cum laude, in 1969 from the University of Puerto Rico School of Law and a LL.M. in 1972 from Harvard Law School with a Ford Urban Law Fellowship.

=== Law career ===
He began his law career working at Legal Aid Services (1969-1970) in Puerto Rico. The next year he became Director of the Legal Division of Puerto Rico's Environmental Quality Board (Junta de Calidad Ambiental). From 1973 to 1974 he was a Special Aid to Rafael Hernández Colón, on his first term as Governor of Puerto Rico. His duties as Special Aid included legislation, appointments, security, executive clemency as well as legal counsel to other aids. In September 1974 he was appointed as Chief Clerk of the Supreme Court of the Commonwealth of Puerto Rico and Assistant to Chief Justice José Trías Monge.

=== Superior court judge ===
Two years later, in 1976, he was appointed by Governor Hernández Colón as Superior Court Judge, a position in which he served for 21 consecutive years until retirement in 1997. He then served as President of the Advertising Review Board of the State Elections Commission of Puerto Rico) and as Member of the “Blue Ribbon Committee” or the Independent Commission of Citizens to Evaluate Government Transactions (Comisión Independiente de Ciudadanos para Evaluar Transacciones Gubernamentales) established by the first elected female governor in the history of Puerto Rico Sila María Calderón.

== Selected writings by Angel G. Hermida ==
- Some comments on the legal transculturation process in Puerto Rico
- La ley de procedimiento administrativo uniforme de 1988, y las reglas para la revisión judicial de 1989 : algunos aspectos de especial interés para los jueces
