= José Severo Quiñones =

Chief Justice of the Supreme Court of Puerto Rico

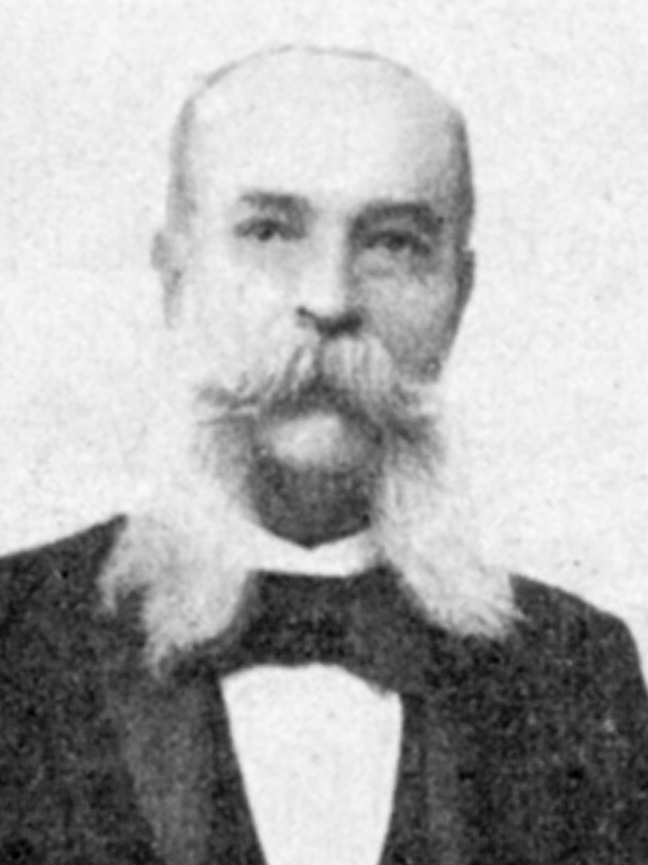
- Quiñones in 1898

Chief justice of the Supreme Court of Puerto Rico
- In office June 5, 1900 – March 6, 1909
- Preceded by: Office created
- Succeeded by: José Conrado Hernández

Personal details
- Born: José Severo Quińones Caro; November 6, 1838 San Juan, Puerto Rico
- Died: March 6, 1909 (aged 70) Santurce, San Juan, Puerto Rico
- Education: Conciliar Seminary of Mexico; University of Seville; Central University of Madrid (lic.)
- Occupation: Lawyer; judge

José Severo Quiñones Caro (November 6, 1838 – March 6, 1909) was a Puerto Rican judge and lawyer. He served in the Spanish government of Puerto Rico before serving briefly as the Secretary of Agriculture, Industry, and Commerce of the autonomous government in 1898. Following the Foraker Act, he served as the first chief justice of the Supreme Court of Puerto Rico from 1900 to his death in 1909.

== Early life ==
José Severo Quiñones Caro was born on November 6, 1839, in San Juan, Puerto Rico. He graduated in 1854 with a bachelor's degree in philosophy from the Conciliar Seminary of Mexico. He studied law at the University of Seville before transferring to the Central University of Madrid, where he graduated with a licentiate degree in civil and canon law in 1860.

== Career ==
In 1861, Quiñones returned to Puerto Rico. In 1862, he began practicing law in San Juan and continued until 1897. In 1871, he was appointed as Counsellor of Administration by royal decree. In 1872, he was vice president of the provincial deputation. He presided over the electoral board in the City Hall of San Juan. In this role, he expelled the general governor, Gómez Pulido.

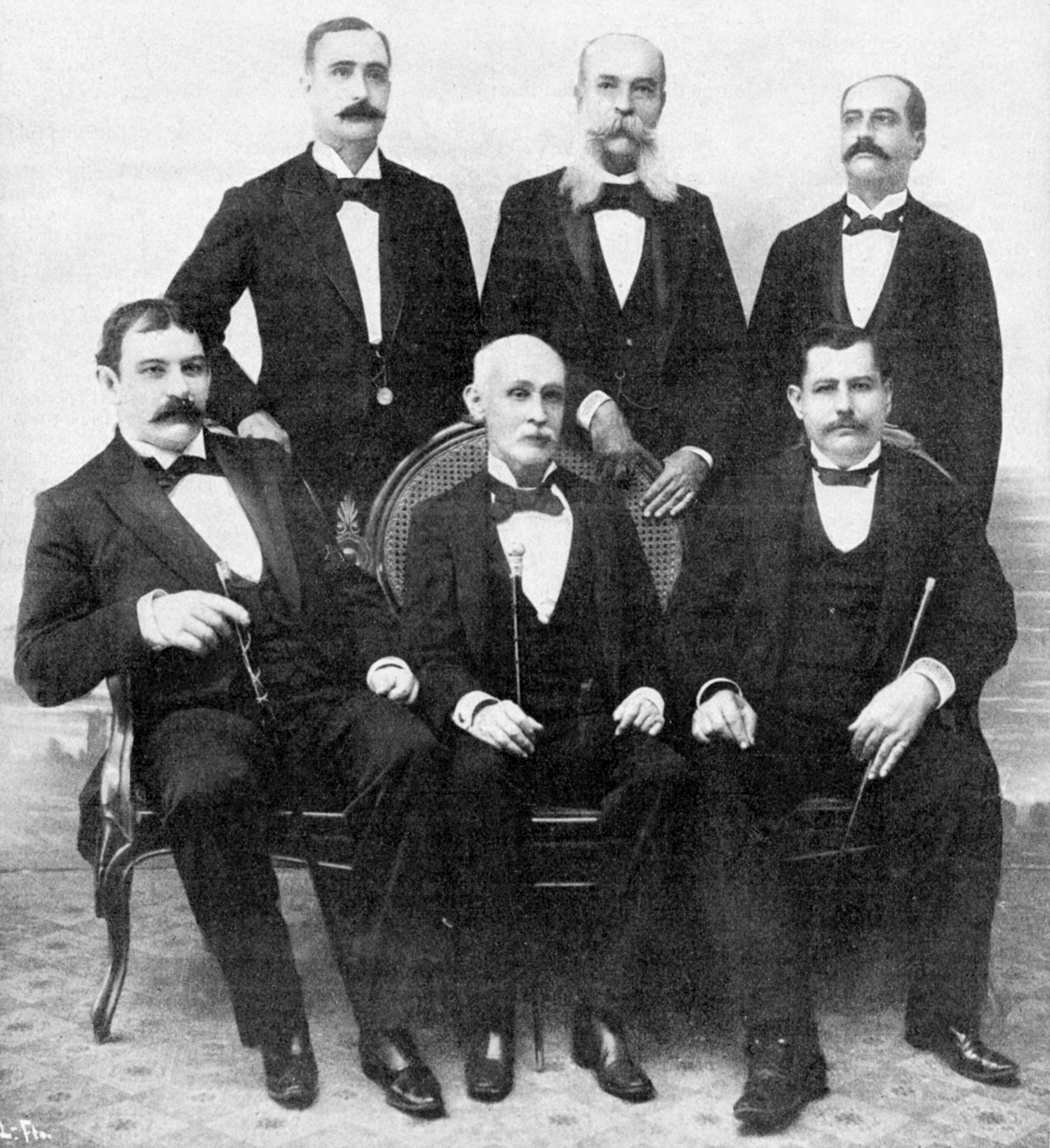
Quiñones (top center) with Puerto Rico's first Autonomous Cabinet in 1898

In 1897, Quiñones was appointed by the Spanish government as general sub-treasurer and chief of the Civil Administrative Division of Puerto Rico. On February 11, 1898, he became the Secretary of Agriculture, Industry, and Commerce of the autonomous government. He served in that role for less than a year. He was then elected as delegate to the Chamber. He resigned that position to accept a seat in the Administrative Councilor.

Quiñones became prosecutor of the Territorial Audience. He was also an alternative magistrate of the Audience and the tribunal. He was appointed by General John R. Brooke as President of the Territorial Audience.

Following the Foraker Act, President William McKinley appointed Quiñones as supreme court of the Supreme Court of Puerto Rico on June 5, 1900. He remained in this role until his death.

In 1904, Quiñones represented the United States in the Universal Congress of Lawyers that met in St. Louis, Missouri.

== Personal life ==
Quiñones was a Knight Grand Cross of the Order of Isabella the Catholic.

Quińones died on March 6, 1909, in Santurce, San Juan, Puerto Rico.

Legal offices
Preceded by Office created	Chief Justice of Puerto Rico; 1900–1909	Succeeded by José Conrado Hernández
