= Vivian Neptune Rivera =

American lawyer

President and CEO of Puerto Rico Community Foundation * and former Dean of the University of Puerto Rico School of Law
- In office 2011–2026
- Preceded by: Roberto Aponte Toro

Personal details
- Born: Fajardo, Puerto Rico
- Education: University of Puerto Rico (BEc); University of Puerto Rico School of Law (J.D); Columbia University Law School (LLM)

Vivian Neptune Rivera (born in Fajardo, Puerto Rico) is a lawyer, academic, and current President and CEO of Puerto Rico Community Foundation *. She is the former Dean of the University of Puerto Rico School of Law position that she held from March 2011 until April 2026.

She graduated from Santiago Veve Calzada High School in Fajardo. Completed a Bachelor of Economics from the University of Puerto Rico and her Juris Doctor from the University of Puerto Rico School of Law, where she had tenure, before obtaining a Master of Laws degree from Columbia University Law School in New York City.

She clerked for former chief judge of the Supreme Court of Puerto Rico Federico Hernández Denton, and Judge Germán Brau of the Puerto Rico Appeals Court. In 2014, Dean Neptune was appointed to the Access to Justice Commission of the Puerto Rico Supreme Court.

In January 2019, she received the Deborah Rhode Award in Pro Bono and Public Interest granted by the Association of American Law Schools (AALS) in recognition of her commitment to serving the communities and people with the greatest needs in Puerto Rico by promoting the expansion of the Pro Bono program and the Legal Aid Clinics. In May 2015, she received the Academic Excellence Award granted by the Puerto Rico Bar Association of New York.

Vivian Neptune Rivera steeped down as Dean of the University of Puerto Rico School of Law after 15 years in the position.

Academic offices
Preceded by Roberto Aponte Toro	Dean of the University of Puerto Rico School of Law; 2011–present	Incumbent
