= Francisco Besosa =

Puerto Rican judge (born 1949)

Francisco Augusto Besosa
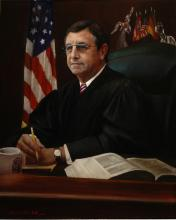

Senior Judge of the United States District Court for the District of Puerto Rico
- Incumbent
- Assumed office January 1, 2022

Judge of the United States District Court for the District of Puerto Rico
- In office September 27, 2006 – January 1, 2022
- Appointed by: George W. Bush
- Preceded by: Juan Pérez-Giménez
- Succeeded by: Camille Vélez-Rivé

Personal details
- Born: Francisco Augusto Besosa; October 26, 1949 (age 76) San Juan, Puerto Rico
- Education: Brown University (BA); Georgetown University (JD)

Military service
- Allegiance: United States
- Branch/service: United States Army
- Years of service: 1972–1976
- Rank: Captain
- Unit: 313th Military Intelligence Battalion

Francisco Augusto Besosa (born October 26, 1949) is a senior United States district judge of the United States District Court for the District of Puerto Rico.

== Early life and education ==
Besosa was born on October 26, 1949, in San Juan, Puerto Rico, the oldest son of Frank A. Besosa and Augusta V. (Tuty) Stubbe. He attended primary schools in San Juan, and graduated in 1967 from the Taft School in Watertown, Connecticut. He then attended Brown University in Providence, Rhode Island, receiving an Artium Baccalaureus degree with a concentration in History in 1971.

After college, because he had a very low draft number (7), he enlisted in the United States Army under the college option program to attend the United States Army Officer Candidate School. In April, 1972, he graduated from the 23-week course of the United States Army Infantry Officer Candidate School in Fort Benning, Georgia, and was commissioned a Second Lieutenant in the Military Intelligence Branch. After completing the Counterintelligence Officer and Personnel Security Adjudications courses at the United States Army Intelligence Center and School in Fort Huachuca, Arizona, he was posted to Detachment R, 500th Military Intelligence Group in Okinawa, Japan, where he served as Deputy Chief of the detachment's counterintelligence field office until 1974. Besosa was then reassigned as the Assistant S-2 (Intelligence and Security Officer) of the 313th Military Intelligence Battalion in Fort Bragg, North Carolina. When the 504th Military Intelligence Group was activated in Hunter Army Airfield in Savannah, Georgia, Besosa was assigned as the Group's S-2, with the additional duty of the Group's Race Relations/Equal Opportunity Officer. In 1976, he was honorably discharged as a Captain, and was awarded the Meritorious Service Medal. In March, 2007, Besosa was elected to the Infantry Officer Candidate School Hall of Fame. Once discharged from the Army, Besosa attended Georgetown University Law Center, receiving his Juris Doctor in 1979.

== Career ==
After approving the Puerto Rico bar examination, he worked as an attorney in some of the leading law firms in San Juan, eventually becoming a partner. He was also an Assistant United States Attorney from 1983 to 1986. While in private practice and as an Assistant United States Attorney, he litigated and tried all types of cases in the civil and commercial areas of the law. Besosa was lead counsel or actively participated in various of the large complex litigation cases filed in the courts of Puerto Rico, including the E.I. DuPont de Nemours Benlate Fungicide Litigation and the Río Piedras Humberto Vidal Building Explosion Litigation. In 1994, he was a founding partner of the Adsuar, Muñiz, Goyco & Besosa, P.S.C., law firm and chaired its Litigation and Trial Practice Department and the Recruiting Committee.

While Besosa was in private practice, this Court appointed him to the United States Magistrate Judge Merit Selection Panel in 1993, to the Court's Committee to Revise the Local Court Rules, and as an evaluator in the Court's Early Neutral Evaluation Program. Besosa was also appointed a member of the Puerto Rico Bar Examination Review Board by the Supreme Court of Puerto Rico.

For more than 30 years, Besosa was the Chairman of the Puerto Rico-U.S. Virgin Islands Area of the Brown Alumni Schools Committee, recruiting and interviewing highly qualified students for Brown University. Under Besosa's chairmanship, the Puerto Rico-U.S. Virgin Islands Area was awarded a distinguished service award by the university. In 1998, Brown University awarded Besosa its Alumni Service Award.

From 1987 to 1993 Besosa was a member of the Board of Regents of the Colegio Puertorriqueño de Niñas, serving as the Board's vice president from 1991 to 1993. He also served as the Assistant Cubmaster and later Chairman of the Pack Committee of Cub Scout Pack 31 from 1991 to 1994. From 1998 to 1999 he was a member of the Board of Directors of the Puerto Rico Tennis Association.

Besosa was a member of the Puerto Rico Bar Association until 2009, and is a member of the District of Columbia Bar Association, the American Bar Association, the Hispanic National Bar Association, and the Federal Bar Association, of which he served as a Director of the Puerto Rico Chapter.

=== Federal judicial service ===
On May 16, 2006, President George W. Bush nominated Besosa to be a United States district judge of the United States District Court for the District of Puerto Rico to fill the vacancy created by Judge Juan Pérez-Giménez who assumed senior status on March 28, 2006. He was confirmed by the Senate on September 25, 2006, received his judicial commission on September 27, 2006. He took the oath of office on October 2, 2006. Besosa assumed senior status on January 1, 2022.

=== Notable cases ===
Besosa has handled several prominent cases during his judicial career. On May 17, 2011, he sentenced former Senate of Puerto Rico Majority Leader Jorge De Castro Font to five years in prison and three years probation after convicting him for numerous public corruption cases. Previously, he presided over the trial of former senator Héctor Martínez, whom he sentenced to a four-year federal prison term.

Judge Francisco A. Besosa sentenced record producer and president of the record label 'Pina Records' Rafael "Raphy" Pina-Nieves to a term of 41 months in prison, 3 years of supervised release, 200 hours of community service and a fine of one hundred fifty thousand dollars ($150,000) for firearms violations being a convicted felon, and possession of a machinegun. Pina-Nieves was found guilty by a federal jury on December 22, 2021.

== See also ==
- List of Hispanic and Latino American jurists

== Sources ==
Legal offices
Preceded by Juan Pérez-Giménez	Judge of the United States District Court for the District of Puerto Rico; 2006–2022	Succeeded by Camille Vélez-Rivé
