= Hiram Meléndez Juarbe =

Puerto Rican academic

Hiram Meléndez-Juarbe (born in 1976 in San Juan, Puerto Rico) was a member of the Puerto Rico Commission on Civil Rights. He is a Professor and former Associate Dean at the University of Puerto Rico School of Law, where he teaches constitutional law, privacy and technology, copyright and intellectual property topics, cyberlaw, administrative law and seminars on constitutional law and cyberspace. He is founder of the UPR New Technologies, Intellectual Property and Society Clinic and co-legal lead of Creative Commons Puerto Rico. He graduated from the University of Puerto Rico (BA 1997, JD 2000), Harvard University (LL.M. 2002) and New York University (LL.M. 2008, SJD 2013). He is co-founder of the blawg derechoalderecho.
