= Edgardo Rivera García =

Puerto Rican judge (born 1955)

Associate Justice of the Supreme Court of Puerto Rico
- In office September 1, 2010 – January 3, 2025
- Appointed by: Luis Fortuño
- Preceded by: Efraín Rivera Pérez

Personal details
- Born: January 3, 1955 (age 71) San Juan, Puerto Rico
- Education: University of Puerto Rico, Río Piedras (BA, MPA, JD)

Edgardo Rivera García (born January 3, 1955) is a Puerto Rican jurist who served as an associate justice of the Supreme Court of Puerto Rico from 2010 to 2025. He was nominated by Governor Luis Fortuño to succeed retired Justice Efraín Rivera Pérez. Nominated on August 3, 2010, he was confirmed by the Senate of Puerto Rico on September 8, 2010.

== Early life ==
Born on January 3, 1955, in San Juan, Puerto Rico, Rivera García studied at the Liceo Interamericano Castro before obtaining his Bachelor of Arts degree from the University of Puerto Rico, Río Piedras Campus, in 1977. At the same university, he obtained a Masters in Public Administration in 1983 and a Juris Doctor in 1988. He is single and the father of three daughters.

== Public service ==
He began his public service career with the Municipal Government of San Juan. During the first few years, he worked in technical and planning roles in the area of social and urban development for communities in extreme poverty. He is appointed to hold the position of Director of Systems and Managerial Development to assist the Mayor of San Juan in socioeconomic studies and in proposals for federal programs. Subsequently, he was appointed Director of Administration of the Human Resources Department and eventually promoted to Associate Director of the Community Development Area.

He was appointed by Governor Pedro Rosselló as a district attorney in 1994, resigning in 1997 to become then-Senate President Charlie Rodriguez's Director of Legislative Affairs until 2000. That year, Rosselló nominated him to be a Superior Court Judge in the judicial region of Arecibo, Caguas and special designations in the judicial region of Utuado, a post he held until Fortuño appointed him to the court of appeals in 2009. On January 3, 2025 Rivera García stepped down from the court at age 70.

== See also ==
- List of Hispanic and Latino American jurists

Legal offices
Preceded by Efraín Rivera Pérez	Associate Justice of the Supreme Court of Puerto Rico; 2010–2025	Succeeded by Raúl Candelario López
