= Emilio del Toro Cuebas =

Puerto Rican judge (1876–1955)

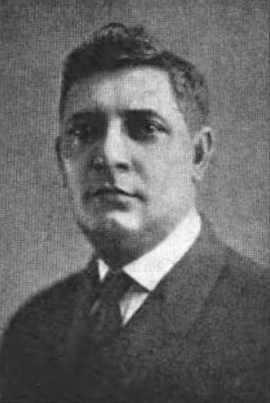

Chief Justice of the Supreme Court of Puerto Rico
- In office 1922–1943
- Nominated by: Warren G. Harding
- Preceded by: José Conrado Hernández
- Succeeded by: Martín Travieso

Associate Justice of the Supreme Court of Puerto Rico
- In office 1909–1922
- Nominated by: William Howard Taft
- Preceded by: José Conrado Hernández
- Succeeded by: Carlos Franco Soto

Personal details
- Born: June 4, 1876 Cabo Rojo, Puerto Rico
- Died: November 10, 1955 (aged 79) San Juan, Puerto Rico
- Education: University of Havana (JD)

Emilio del Toro Cuebas (June 4, 1876 – November 10, 1955) served as the third Chief Justice of the Supreme Court of Puerto Rico from 1922 until 1943.

== Biography ==
Born in Cabo Rojo, Puerto Rico in 1876, earned a bachelor's degree in philosophy in Puerto Rico and later his degree in law from the University of Havana in 1897. He began his career in the private practice in 1898, seven years later began his juridical career. He served as Prosecutor for the District courts of Humacao and San Juan. He later became Assistant Attorney General of Puerto Rico, and was appointed as Supreme Court prosecutor and Judge of the San Juan District Court.

In 1909 he was appointed Associate Justice of the Puerto Rico Supreme Court by president William Howard Taft and in 1922 was appointed chief justice by president Warren G. Harding. Del Toro held that position until his retirement in 1943.

He died in San Juan on November 10, 1955 at the age of 69, and was buried at the Puerto Rico Memorial Cemetery in Carolina, Puerto Rico.

Legal offices
Preceded by José Conrado Hernández	Associate Justice of the Puerto Rico Supreme Court; 1909–1922	Succeeded by Carlos Franco Soto
Preceded by José Conrado Hernández	Chief Justice of the Puerto Rico Supreme Court; 1922–1943	Succeeded by Martín Travieso
