= José Conrado Hernández =

Chief Justice of the Supreme Court of Puerto Rico

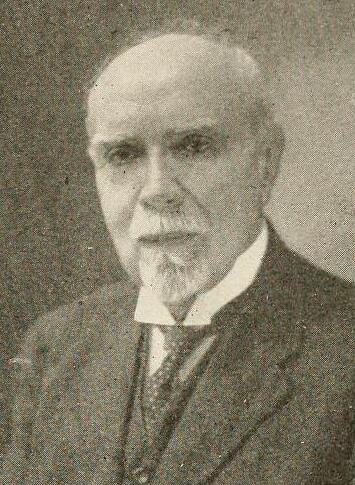
- Hernández in a 1922 publication

Chief Justice of the Supreme Court of Puerto Rico
- In office 1909–1922
- Preceded by: José Severo Quiñones
- Succeeded by: Emilio del Toro Cuebas

Associate Justice to the Supreme Court of Puerto Rico
- In office May 1, 1900 – 1909
- Preceded by: Position established
- Succeeded by: Emilio del Toro Cuebas

Personal details
- Born: José Conrado Hernández Santiago; February 19, 1849 Aibonito, Puerto Rico
- Died: June 20, 1932 (aged 83) San Juan, Puerto Rico
- Education: University of Salamanca; Colegio Central de Salamanca
- Occupation: Judge

José Conrado Hernández Santiago (February 19, 1849 – June 20, 1932) was a Puerto Rican judge. He served as a judge under the Spanish monarchy in Puerto Rico, Cuba, and in the Philippines, later serving in the Philippines under American territorial administration. He was appointed as one of the first associate justices of the newly established Supreme Court of Puerto Rico in 1900. He served as the second chief justice of the court from 1909 to 1922.

== Early life ==
José Conrado Hernández was born on February 19, 1849, in Aibonito, Puerto Rico. He was educated in Spain. In 1865, he obtained a Bachelor of Arts. He graduated with a degree in civil and canon law from the University of Salamanca in 1873. He later graduated with a doctorate in theology from the Colegio Central de Salamanca.

== Career ==
In 1874, Hernández was admitted to practice law in San Juan. He served as a judge and prosecutor of towns in Puerto Rico during Spanish rule. He was judge of First Instance in Aguadilla and Mayagüez, Puerto Rico, and Santiago, Cuba. He served as a judge under the Spanish monarchy in Cuba from 1888 to 1891 and in the Philippines from 1891 to 1898. He was judge of the courts of Pinar del Río and of Santa Clara in Cuba. He was judge of the territorial courts of Cebu and Manila in the Philippines.

Hernández served as a judge of the Territorial Court of Puerto Rico. In December 1898, the Spanish government publicly denounced Hernández and declared him a traitor for accepting employment under the United States.

In 1900, Hernández was appointed by President William McKinley as one of the first associate justices of the newly established Supreme Court of Puerto Rico. He started his term on May 1, 1900. He was appointed president of the Board of Prison Control in March 1900. In 1909, he was appointed as chief justice of the court by President William Howard Taft. He served until his retirement in 1922.

== Personal life ==
Hernández died on June 20, 1932, aged 84, in San Juan.

Legal offices
Preceded by None	Associate Justice of the Puerto Rico Supreme Court; 1900–1909	Succeeded by Emilio del Toro Cuebas
Preceded by José Severo Quiñones	Chief Justice of the Puerto Rico Supreme Court; 1909–1922	Succeeded by Emilio del Toro Cuebas
