= Jaime Sifre Dávila =

American judge

Chief Justice of the Supreme Court of Puerto Rico
- In office August 1957 – October 6, 1957
- Nominated by: Luis Muñoz Marín
- Preceded by: A. Cecil Snyder
- Succeeded by: Luis Negrón Fernández

Associate Justice to the Supreme Court of Puerto Rico
- In office 1952–1957
- Nominated by: Luis Muñoz Marín
- Preceded by: New seat created
- Succeeded by: Carlos Santana Becerra

Personal details
- Born: November 24, 1887 Vega Baja, Puerto Rico
- Died: October 6, 1960 (aged 72) San Juan, Puerto Rico
- Education: University of Michigan Law School (JD)

Jaime Sifre Dávila (November 24, 1887 – October 6, 1960) was an attorney and judge in Puerto Rico, ultimately serving as an associate justice and briefly as the eighth chief justice of the Supreme Court of Puerto Rico.

Sifre was born to Jaime Sifre Tarafa and Belén Dávila Santana in Vega Baja, Puerto Rico. In 1887, he obtained a Masters of Law (LLM) from University of Michigan Law School, graduating in 1908. He married Consuelo Cordova Davila on December 17, 1910, and had six children.

He was appointed to the position of Associate Justice of the Supreme Court of Puerto Rico in August 1952. In 1957, he was appointed by Governor Luis Muñoz Marín to succeed embattled A. Cecil Snyder as Chief Justice. He only served as chief justice for two months before his resignation. He died October 6, 1960, in San Juan, Puerto Rico. He is buried at the Santa María Magdalena de Pazzis Cemetery.

Legal offices
Preceded by New seat created	Associate Justice of the Puerto Rico Supreme Court; 1952–1957	Succeeded by Carlos Santana Becerra
Preceded by A. Cecil Snyder	Chief Justice of the Puerto Rico Supreme Court; August 1957 – October 6, 1957	Succeeded by Luis Negrón Fernández
