= Pedro Delgado Hernández =

Puerto Rican judge (born 1956)

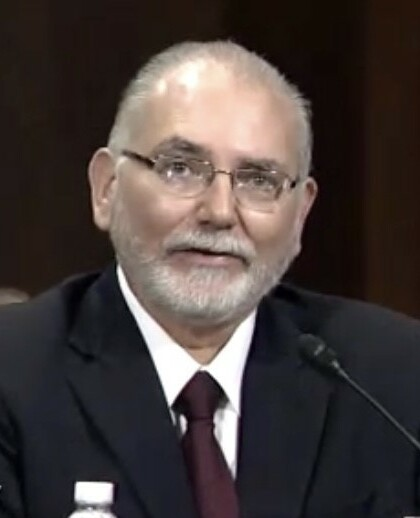
- Delgado Hernández in 2013

Judge of the United States District Court for the District of Puerto Rico
- Incumbent
- Assumed office March 7, 2014
- Appointed by: Barack Obama
- Preceded by: Daniel R. Domínguez

Judge of the Puerto Rico Court of Appeals
- In office 1995–1996
- Appointed by: Pedro Rosselló

Solicitor General of Puerto Rico
- In office 1993–1996
- Appointed by: Pedro Rosselló

Personal details
- Born: Pedro Alberto Delgado Hernández; 1956 (age 69–70) San Juan, Puerto Rico
- Education: University of Puerto Rico (BS, JD)

Pedro Alberto Delgado Hernández (born 1956) is a United States district judge of the United States District Court for the District of Puerto Rico.

== Biography ==
Delgado Hernández was born in 1956, in San Juan, Puerto Rico. He received a Bachelor of Science degree in 1979, from the University of Puerto Rico. He received a Juris Doctor, magna cum laude, in 1983, from the University of Puerto Rico School of Law. He began his legal career as a law clerk with the Puerto Rican Institute of Judicial Studies and then as a law clerk to Judge Juan Torruella, first at the United States District Court for the District of Puerto Rico and then at the United States Court of Appeals for the First Circuit. Delgado Hernández served in the United States Army Reserve from 1979 to 1985. From 1986 to 1993, he worked at the law firm of O'Neill & Borges LLC. From 1993 to 1995, he served as Solicitor General of Puerto Rico. From 1995 to 1996, he served as a judge on the Puerto Rico Court of Appeals. Between 1996 and 2014, he returned as a partner to the O'Neill & Borges LLC law firm, where he handled civil litigation in both State and Federal courts.

=== Federal judicial service ===
On June 26, 2013, President Barack Obama nominated Delgado Hernández to serve as a United States district judge of the United States District Court for the District of Puerto Rico, to the seat vacated by Judge Daniel R. Domínguez, who retired on July 31, 2011. On March 5, 2014, the United States Senate invoked cloture on his nomination by a 57–41 vote with one Senator, John Cornyn, voting 'present'. Delgado Hernández's nomination was confirmed later that day by a 98–0 vote. He received his commission on March 7, 2014.

== See also ==
- List of Hispanic and Latino American jurists
- List of Puerto Ricans

Legal offices
Preceded by Daniel R. Domínguez	Judge of the United States District Court for the District of Puerto Rico; 2014–present	Incumbent
