= Solicitor General of Puerto Rico =

- Incumbent; Omar Andino Figueroa since January 2, 2025
- Puerto Rico Department of Justice
- Style: Mr. Solicitor General
- Reports to: Puerto Rico Attorney General
- Seat: Puerto Rico Department of Justice Headquarters
- Appointer: Governor with advice and consent from the Senate
- Term length: 4 years
- Formation: Established by Act 205 of 2004.
- Website: https://www.justicia.pr.gov/secretarias-y-oficinas/oficina-del-procurador-general/

The Solicitor General of Puerto Rico (Spanish: Procurador General de Puerto Rico) is the attorney who represents the Commonwealth of Puerto Rico in all civil and criminal matters in which it is a party or has an interest, and which are handled on appeal or in any other manner in any territorial court of Puerto Rico, U.S. federal court, or state/territorial court of another jurisdiction. The Solicitor General reports directly to the Governor and leads the Office of the Solicitor General of Puerto Rico. The current Solicitor General is Omar Andino Figueroa.

== Solicitors General ==
- 1959-1967: Juan B. Fernandez-Badillo
- 1968-1969: Rafael Rivera Cruz
- 1969-1972: Gilberto Gierbolini-Ortiz
- 1973-1976: Miriam Naveira
- 1977-1982: Héctor Rivera Cruz
- 1985-1989: Rafael Ortiz Carrión
- 1989–1991: Jorge E. Pérez-Díaz
- 1991-1992: Anabelle Rodríguez Rodríguez
- 1993-1996: Pedro A. Delgado Hernández
- 1997-1999: Carlos Lugo Fiol
- 1999-2000: Gustavo A. Gelpí
- 2000-2000: Luis Cotto Roman
- 2001-2004: Roberto Sánchez Ramos
- 2005-2008: Salvador J. Antonetti Stutts
- 2008-2008: Maite Oronoz Rodríguez
- 2009-2011: Irene S. Soroeta Kodesh
- 2011-2012: Luis R. Román Negrón
- 2013–2017: Margarita Mercado Echegaray
- 2017–2018: Luis R. Román Negrón
- 2018–2020: Isaías Sánchez Báez
- 2021-2025: Fernando Figueroa Santiago
- 2025-current: Omar Andino Figueroa
