= Civil Rights Commission (Puerto Rico) =

Entity within the legislative branch of the government of Puerto Rico

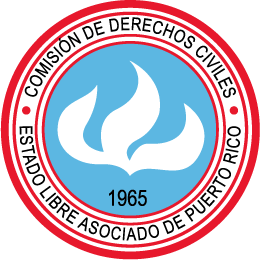

Commission overview
- Formed: June 28, 1965; 61 years ago
- Jurisdiction: Statewide
- Headquarters: San Juan, Puerto Rico
- Commission executive: Ever Padilla Ruiz, Executive Director
- Key document: Act No. 102 of 1965
- Website: www.cdc.pr.gov

The Civil Rights Commission (Spanish: Comisión de Derechos Civiles) is an official entity within the legislative branch of the government of Puerto Rico charged with investigating violations of citizens' civil rights. The commission is empowered to educate citizens about their civil rights, investigate alleged civil rights violations, and carry out studies and investigations. Amendments to its organic law also empowers it to appear as a "friend of the court" in cases that the commission deems to have an important effect on civil rights in Puerto Rico.

== Overview ==
The commission was created in 1965 under governor Roberto Sánchez Vilella as an independent agency under the Department of Justice. But it was not until 1996 that the commission was made part of the legislative branch, due, in part, to the efforts of governor Pedro Rosselló.

The commission is known to speak to and educate children in Puerto Rico's elementary schools about their civil rights. Equal rights for the Puerto Rican LGBT community are defended by the commission.

Structurally, the entity is composed of five members that are appointed to a six-years term by the governor of Puerto Rico, subject to the advice and consent of the Senate. Its only current member is Andrés Córdova-Phelps. Governor Pedro Pierluisi made appointments to fill the four vacancies, including law professor Doel Quiñones and former Secretary of State and Senate President Kenneth McClintock, designations which are pending Senate confirmation. Former Gov. Alejandro García-Padilla had appointed a previous chair, Georgina Candal Segurola, Esther Vicente Rivera, Rosemary Borges Capó, Ruth Miriam Perez Maldonado and Hiram A. Meléndez Juarbe. Other individuals that have served in the commission include former Sen. Luis Muñoz Rivera, newspaper publisher Antonio Luis Ferré, former Resident Commissioner Baltasar Corrada del Río, and the late UPR Río Piedras campus chancellor Efraín González Tejera.

In spite of complaints that the commission is chronically underfunded, the entity has had a significant influence in Puerto Rican government operations. In mid-2019, it requested Julia Keleher, the Secretary of Education, be investigated for comments she made about how contracts were being awarded. Keleher ended up being arrested for breaking the law and her arrest along with Telegramgate contributed to then Governor Ricardo Rossello having to resign from his position as governor.

In late 2019, the commission demanded to know the number of inmate deaths that have occurred over the last five years, fearing that perhaps inmates' rights are being violated while incarcerated in Puerto Rico's prisons and jails.

The commission also annually selects the recipients of the Thurgood Marshall Award, which recognizes the commitment to civil rights of one law student from each of Puerto Rico's three law schools. The award was created through legislation authored by Senator Kenneth McClintock, coincidentally appointed to the commission by Gov. Pierluisi.
