= Supreme Court of Puerto Rico =

Coordinates: 18°27′47″N 66°5′18″W

- Interactive map of Supreme Court of Puerto Rico
- 18°27'47.6"N 66°05'17.6"W
- Established: 1900; 126 years ago
- Jurisdiction: Puerto Rico
- Location: San Juan, Puerto Rico
- Coordinates: 18°27'47.6"N 66°05'17.6"W
- Composition method: Appointed by the Governor of Puerto Rico with the advice and consent of the Senate
- Authorised by: Constitution of Puerto Rico
- Appeals to: Supreme Court of the United States
- Judge term length: Justices serve until they reach 70 years of age
- Number of positions: 9
- Website: poderjudicial.pr

Chief Justice
- Currently: Maite Oronoz Rodríguez
- Since: February 22, 2016

The Supreme Court of Puerto Rico (Spanish: Tribunal Supremo de Puerto Rico) is the highest court of Puerto Rico, having judicial authority to construe and decide questions of Puerto Rico law. The Court is analogous to one of the state supreme courts of the states of the United States and is the highest state court and the court of last resort in Puerto Rico. Article V of the Constitution of Puerto Rico vests the judicial power in the Supreme Court, which by nature forms the judicial branch of the government of Puerto Rico. The seat of the Supreme Court is the Supreme Court Building in San Juan Islet in the capital municipality of San Juan.

== History ==
The first Supreme Court of Puerto Rico was established following the Spanish-American War to replace the Real Audiencia de Puerto Rico that had been in place since the early 19th century. This body had a single room to deal with criminal and civil cases and was presided ex oficio by the governor of Puerto Rico (first by Miguel de la Torre) until 1891, also including the regent, a prosecutor and a number of oidores or judges. On January 5, 1891, a royal decree changed the composition to include a Chief Justice, a courtroom president, a chief prosecutor, an assistant prosecutor, atax lawyer, a government secretary and four magistrates, none of which could be originate from Puerto Rico or married to someone born in the island. During the final stages of the Spanish administration, the institution was composed by president Venacio Zorilla, courtroom president Nicolás Lillo Rodas, prosecutor Enrique Díaz Guijarro and magistrates Antonio Martínez Ruiz, José Conrado Hernández (subject to an exception, due to being Puerto Rican), Arístides Mariagliano and Francisco Vasco y Vasco.

Under the American military occupation, General Order 1 prompted the legal system to swear allegiance to the flag of the United States while initially retaining the structures that were created under the Spanish administration. On September 21, 1898, Juan Morera Martínez was named auxiliary supplemental magistrate and José Severo Quiñones y Caro and Grancisco de Paula Acuña y Paniagua were named interim magistrates replacing Vasco and Ulloa. There was no military order establishing a Supreme Court or its competence, but rather a transition from one legal system to the other and by November 1898 the term "Supreme Court of Justice" had fully replaced Audiencia de Puerto Rico in the official documentation. On October 27, 1898, the military government dissolved the Court of Appeals (known as the "Contencioso Administrativo") and merged its function into the Supreme Court through General Order 4. On December 14, 1898, Guy V. Henry named Morera suplente again.

General Order 19 ratified General Order 4 and formally established the constitution and function of the Supreme Court, with seven magistrates (including a president) and the replacement of these by supplemental or first instance judges from San Juan. Arístides Maragliano retained his office as magistrate, others were reassigned with Acuña as prosecutor, Conrado courtroom president and Quiñones as Chief Justice. José de Diego Martínez and José María Figueras were named on October 28 and 29 respectively. Rafael Nieto Abeillé was nominated on November 3. Two other Puerto Ricans, Rafael Roméu Aguayo and Ángel Acosta Quintero (who had been named as interim initially, but was promoted to full functions), served as magistrate and assistant prosecutor, respectively. A month later, De Diego was transferred to Mayagüez and Acosta ratified as magistrate by Guy V. Henry. Felipe Cuchí Arnau took over as Assistant Prosecutor. On February 9, 1899, Arnau renounced to take over as Secretary of State and was replaced by Roméu with Cuchí in turn replacing the latter as magistrate. On March 17, 1899, Maragliano quit, being replaced by Eduardo Acuña Aybar. During the summer, Nieto was named Attorney General following the creation of a Judicial Board by Davis, with Luis de Ealo y Domínguez serving as interim.

On August 7, 1899, Geo W. Davis issued General Order 114, which reduced two magistrates from the Supreme Court, with Acosta, Arnau and Acuña being reassigned to the San Juan District Court. Acosta served as a substitute on September 25, 1899. By May 1900, Nieto had returned to his office displacing De Ealo. With the imposition of the Foraker Law, the President of the United States was tasked with naming the members of the Supreme Court, retaining all but Morera, who was replaced by Louis Sulzabacher. On March 12, 1903, the Legislative Assembly changed the functions of the Supreme Court to serve as an appeals court instead of a cassation court, a format that would remain in place for the following decades. Unaware of the exact details, Robert H. Todd claimed that the members of the first Supreme Court were president José Severo Quiñones, courtroom president José Conrado Hernández, Juan Morera Martínez, José de Diego, José María Figueras, Rafael Nieto Abeillé and Luis de Ealo y Domínguez in an article published in El Mundo on June 26, 1940, later retconning his own claim and crediting Acosta and Cuchí.

== Structure and powers ==
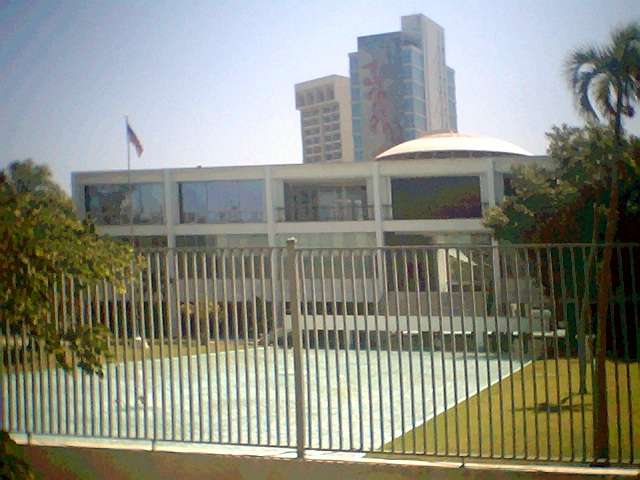
Main façade (west) of Supreme Court Building, located near the land entrance to San Juan Islet

The Supreme Court of Puerto Rico was established by the Foraker Act in 1900 and maintained in the 1952 Constitution of Puerto Rico. It is the only appellate court required by the Constitution. All other courts are created by the Legislative Assembly of Puerto Rico. However, since Puerto Rico is under United States sovereignty, there is also a Federal District Court for the archipelago and island.

The justices (currently eight, with one vacancy) are appointed by the Governor of Puerto Rico and confirmed by majority vote by the Senate. One of the justices serves as Chief Justice; the remaining members are designated Associate Justices. Unlike the Supreme Court of the United States, the justices of the Puerto Rico Supreme Court do not serve for life, as the Puerto Rico Constitution requires that all judges must retire upon reaching age 70.

Although the Constitution of Puerto Rico provides for the Court to be composed of five justices, it also contains a provision that the number may be altered, though only by petition of the Court itself. This provision has been used four times in Court history. Immediately after the Constitution's ratification, the Court asked for two additional judges. During the early 1960s, the Court once again petitioned for the addition of two more judges, arguing that there was a case backlog on its docket. Subsequently, during the 1970s the Court asked for its number to be reduced back to seven members, arguing that the backlog had been attended to. Finally, in 2010 a 4–3 majority of the justices petitioned the Legislative Assembly to once again increase the Court's membership to nine. This decision has generated controversy since it is the first time that such a request has been done without unanimity from the justices.

The jurisdiction of the Supreme Court of Puerto Rico is defined by the Constitution and the laws of Puerto Rico. In general, the jurisdictional structure parallels that of the state Supreme Courts in the continental United States. The Supreme Court of Puerto Rico has concurrent jurisdiction with federal courts to interpret federal laws, unless the Supremacy Clause requires otherwise. Judgments that stand on federal law grounds may be reviewed by the United States Supreme Court, unless an adequate and independent ground for the decision based in Puerto Rico commonwealth law is also present. The Court has the power of judicial review and its decision are considered binding precedent within the jurisdiction of Puerto Rico. The Supreme Court of Puerto Rico also regulates the practice of law in Puerto Rico.

The term of the Puerto Rico Supreme Court begins on the first Monday of October and ends in the last week of June of the following year. However, during the recess months of July through September, an alternating panel of three justices are allowed to hear cases and their decisions are considered binding precedent. However, in order for any law passed by the Legislative Assembly to be declared unconstitutional, it requires the votes of a majority of the total membership of the Court, therefore, a three-justice panel may not hear constitutional challenges to laws passed by the Legislature.

The justices decide whether or not to hear oral arguments for the case. If the case is controversial or carries high public interest, an oral argument may be scheduled, although oral arguments were rare under Chief Justice Hernández Denton. When oral argument occurs, each side has twenty-five minutes to state its respective claims and five minutes for rebuttal. After the sides have ended their argument, each justice has ten minutes (in order of seniority) to ask questions to each side. Justices may decide to yield the balance of their time to one of their colleagues.

Because several Federal judges have voluntarily withdrawn from the Puerto Rico Bar Association and was converted by statute into a voluntary membership organization, the Supreme Court of Puerto Rico maintains the official bar records of Puerto Rico licensed attorneys.

=== Chief Justices ===
The Chief Justice is the presiding officer of the Supreme Court, and amongst its functions it directs the administration of the different courts, chairs the Constitutional Redistricting Board which revises Puerto Rico's senatorial and representative districts after every decennial census, and presides at the impeachment trial of the Governor of Puerto Rico.

- 1900–1909: José Severo Quiñones
- 1909–1922: José Conrado Hernández
- 1922–1943: Emilio del Toro Cuebas
- 1944–1948: Martín Travieso Nieva
- 1948–1951: Angel de Jesús Sánchez
- 1951–1952: Roberto Todd Borrás
- 1953–1957: A. Cecil Snyder
- 1957–1957: Jaime Sifre Dávila
- 1957–1972: Luis Negrón Fernández
- 1973–1974: Pedro Pérez Pimentel
- 1974–1985: José Trías Monge
- 1985–1992: Víctor Pons
- 1992–2003: José Andreu García
- 2003–2004: Miriam Naveira
- 2004–2014: Federico Hernández Denton
- 2014–2016: Liana Fiol Matta
- 2016–present: Maite Oronoz Rodríguez

=== Associate Justices ===
- 2009–present: Rafael Martínez Torres
- 2009–present: Mildred Pabón
- 2009–present: Erick Kolthoff
- 2011–present: Roberto Feliberti Cintrón
- 2011–present: Luis Estrella Martínez
- 2016–present: Angel Colón-Pérez
- 2025–present: Camille Rivera Pérez
- 2025–present: Raúl Candelario López

=== Lower courts ===
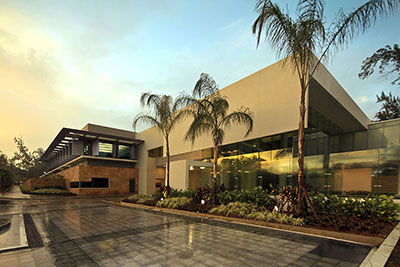
Library of the Supreme Court of Puerto Rico view at dusk

During much of the 20th century, the court system in Puerto Rico had consisted of Municipal Courts, District Courts, and the Supreme Court. Cases could be appealed from Municipal Courts to commonwealth District Courts. From the commonwealth District Courts cases were then appealed to the Commonwealth of Puerto Rico Supreme Court. Municipal and District courts have existed in Puerto Rico since at least the 19th century. When the United States invaded the island, it set to reorganize the judicial system. The U.S. military regime in Puerto Rico promulgated Order 118 of 1899, by which the system of Criminal Courts and Courts of First Instance and Investigation were replaced by five district courts in San Juan, Ponce, Mayaguez, Arecibo and Humacao.

=== Appointments ===
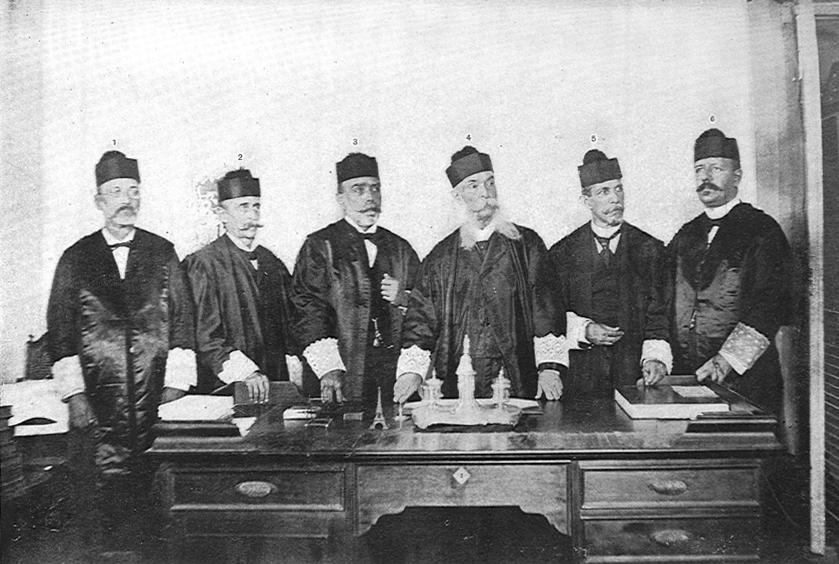
First Supreme Court of Puerto Rico appointed under the Foraker Act.

Appointments to the Supreme Court of Puerto Rico have traditionally been a politicized and often controversial process. The Governor of Puerto Rico usually appoints someone who is affiliated with his own political party. For example, during his sixteen years as Governor, Luis Muñoz Marín appointed only one statehooder, Rafael Hernández Matos to the court, despite the fact that statehooders represented the largest political minority in Puerto Rico. During the four years of divided partisan control of government between 2005 and 2009, when the governorship was occupied by commonwealther Aníbal Acevedo Vilá and the Senate presidency was held by statehooder Kenneth McClintock, despite the 2005 retirement of Associate Justice Baltasar Corrada del Rio, the death of Associate Justice Jaime Fuster in 2007 and the 2008 retirement of Associate Justice Francisco Rebollo, no appointments were made. For over half a century, the Court has been dominated by justices affiliated with the Popular Democratic Party, until February 2009 when, due to the accumulation of unfilled vacancies, pro-statehood Governor Luis Fortuño was able to fill three vacancies. Added to one Justice already on the Court, appointed by another pro-statehood Governor, the justices appointed by statehooders became a majority in the Court. Four women have been appointed justices since 1952; one of them, Miriam Naveira, was Chief Justice for a period of one year. Only one Afro–Puerto Rican, Justice Erick Kolthoff, has served in the Court. He is also the Court's only Protestant.

Liana Fiol Matta, appointed by Gov. Alejandro García Padilla, was the second woman to hold the post of Chief Justice, succeeding Federico Hernández Denton, who was appointed in 2004 by Governor Sila Calderón. Previously, he had served as an Associate Justice from 1985 to 2004. In such capacity, Chief Justice Hernández Denton swore in Governors Aníbal Acevedo Vilá and Luis Fortuño. The Chief Justice is also the administrator of the Judicial Branch of Puerto Rico.

Then Associate Justice Oronoz was confirmed in 2016 becoming the first lesbian and third woman to preside the court. This also marked the point in which four female justices constituted the largest number of women in history to serve on the court simultaneously.

== Current composition ==
Name	Born	Start	Mandatory Retirement	Appointer	Law School
Maite Oronoz Rodríguez, Chief Justice	1976 (age 49–50)	February 22, 2016 (Note: Oronoz Rodríguez was originally appointed by Gov. Garcia Padilla as an associate justice on July 15, 2014.)	2046	Alejandro Garcia Padilla (PPD)	UPR; Columbia (LLM)
Rafael Martínez Torres	February 14, 1959 (age 67)	March 10, 2009	February 14, 2029	Luis Fortuño (PNP)	UPR
Mildred Pabón	November 27, 1957 (age 68)	March 10, 2009	November 27, 2027	Luis Fortuño (PNP)	UPR
Erick Kolthoff	September 15, 1961 (age 64)	March 10, 2009	September 15, 2031	Luis Fortuño (PNP)	UPR
Roberto Feliberti Cintrón	April 7, 1963 (age 63)	May 25, 2011	April 7, 2033	Luis Fortuño (PNP)	UPR
Luis Estrella Martínez	November 17, 1971 (age 54)	May 25, 2011	November 17, 2041	Luis Fortuño (PNP)	UPR
Angel Colón-Pérez	1977 (age 48–49)	August 31, 2016	2047	Alejandro Garcia Padilla (PPD)	UIPR
Camille Rivera Pérez	December 3, 1974 (age 51)	January 16, 2025	December 3, 2044	Jenniffer González-Colón (PNP)	PUCPR
Raúl Candelario López		January 16, 2025		Jenniffer González-Colón (PNP)	PUCPR

== Controversies ==
The realignment on the Puerto Rico Supreme Court has led to several significant court decisions. In Suarez Caceres vs CEE, the court overruled a previous court decision that required that a "None of the Above" option be included in political status plebiscites. That option obtained an absolute majority of votes in the 1998 political status plebiscite.

A 4–3 majority amended Rule 5 of the court's regulations to enable the most senior judge on the majority side of every case to determine the member of the Court that would write the majority opinion, which is the practice in the Supreme Court of the United States. Previously, the Chief Justice, even when on the minority side of a case, assigned the writing of the opinion of the Court.

=== Conflicts with the U.S. Federal Court ===
From 1915 to 1961, decisions of the Puerto Rico Supreme Court could be appealed to the United States Court of Appeals for the First Circuit. In earlier years, the First Circuit frequently reversed the Puerto Rico Supreme Court, sometimes attempting to impose its own interpretations of Puerto Rico's civil law legal norms despite the Boston-based court's unfamiliarity with Puerto Rico jurisprudence, until a series of opinions by United States Supreme Court Justice Oliver Wendell Holmes instructed that the Puerto Rico Supreme Court's interpretations were not to be overturned by the federal appeals court unless they were "manifestly wrong".

With the standard of review so limited, and especially after Puerto Rico adopted its 1952 Constitution, the route for appeals was deemed anachronistic and was repealed in 1961, instead providing Puerto Rico with a judicial state-federal court structure equal to that of States.

Today, decisions of the Puerto Rico Supreme Court are as final as those of any state supreme court and are reviewable by the Supreme Court of the United States only pursuant to a writ of certiorari, when an important question of federal law is involved.

Conflicts between the Puerto Rico courts and the federal court do arise from time to time. According to the 1952 Constitution of Puerto Rico, the jurisdiction of the Supreme Court is only for laws of the Commonwealth of Puerto Rico. However, on several occasions, the U.S. District Court for the District of Puerto Rico has taken jurisdiction on cases having to do with Puerto Rico law.

In 2016, the U.S. Supreme Court decided in the case of Puerto Rico v. Sanchez Valle that, on the point of double jeopardy, Puerto Rico was not sovereign and so it could not charge someone with crimes for which said person already had been tried by the United States.

=== 2004 general election ===
A highly controversial instance occurred in November 2004, when the Supreme Court of Puerto Rico declared that certain disputed ballots should be counted during the Puerto Rico general election. The New Progressive Party brought the matter to the Federal Court and claimed that some of the ballots had been spoiled. Federal Judge Daniel R. Domínguez took jurisdiction of the case, in a ruling that would effectively have nullified the decision of the Supreme Court. However, on December 15, 2004, the First Circuit Court of Appeals reversed Domínguez's decision and found that questions on the electoral process of Puerto Rico are matters reserved for the Puerto Rico local court system, headed by the Supreme Court of Puerto Rico.

== See also ==
- State court (United States)#Nomenclature
- Judiciary of Puerto Rico
- Luis Muñoz Rivera Park
