= University of Puerto Rico School of Law =

Graduate school program of University of Puerto Rico, Río Piedras Campus

- Established: 22 September 1913; 112 years ago
- School type: Public
- Dean: Vivian I. Neptune- Rivera
- Location: Rio Piedras, Puerto Rico
- Enrollment: 449
- Faculty: 28 (full-time), 82 (part-time)
- USNWR ranking: 175-194 out of 194 (2026)
- Bar pass rate: 51.43% (2023 first-time takers); 80.16% (pass in two years)
- Website: derecho.uprrp.edu
- ABA profile: UPR School of Law Profile

The University of Puerto Rico School of Law is the law school of the University of Puerto Rico at Río Piedras, the only law school in the University of Puerto Rico System and the only public law school in Puerto Rico. It was founded in 1913 at its present site in Río Piedras, which at the time was an independent municipality and is now part of the City of San Juan. The School of Law has been accredited by the American Bar Association since 1945 and has been a member of the Association of American Law Schools since 1948.

== Academics ==
The Law School's academic program aims to increase and diversify the learning and development experiences of its students. Thus, 43 of its 92 credit/hour study program is elective, with course offerings ranging from theoretical to practical in topics pertaining to civil rights, technology, feminism, business, international relations and comparative law, among others. In addition, students are required to participate in a clinical program. The majority of the courses are taught in Spanish.

The Law School has several programs of study.

- Juris Doctor (JD)
- Dual Juris Doctor and Law Degree Program (Licenciatura en Derecho) with the University of Barcelona, Spain;
- Juris Doctor and Master of Business Administration with the University of Puerto Rico Graduate School of Business Administration;
- Juris Doctor and Doctor of Medicine with the University of Puerto Rico School of Medicine;
- Juris Doctor and Master in Public Administration with the University of Puerto Rico the Roberto Sánchez Vilella School of Public Administration;
- Juris Doctor and Master in Architecture with the University of Puerto Rico School of Architecture; and,
- Juris Doctor and Master in Planning with the University of Puerto Rico Graduate School of Planning.

Graduate:

- LL.M. for Latin American and Caribbean lawyers;
- LL.M. in Criminal Law:
- LL.M. in Judiciary Training;
- LL.M. in Commercial Law:
- LL.M. in Intellectual Property Law; and,
- LL.M. Online in Criminal Law.

The School of Law has students exchange programs with the University of Arizona James E. Rogers College of Law, Vermont Law School, Florida International University, the University of Connecticut School of Law, the University of Palermo in Argentina, Diego Portales University in Chile, the University of Chile Law School, the University of Ottawa Faculty of Law in Canada, the University of Antwerp in Belgium and the University of Carlos III of Madrid. Under these programs, students register at their home institution, but will take a full course load at the host institution. The credits and grades earned during a single semester will be awarded by the home institution according to the standard procedure of the home law school. Students also have a chance to participate in a summer law program at the University of Barcelona, Spain.

The school has a winter exchange program with the University of Ottawa Faculty of Law in Canada, through which students can earn four credits studying Law and Technology or Law, Technology, and Feminism for one week in Canada and two weeks in Puerto Rico.

== Clinical Program ==
In March 1974, the Puerto Rico Supreme Court approved rules for the local courts to allow students to practice law and participate in judicial proceedings. The US District Court followed suit in 1991. The school requires that students complete a two-semester clinical program in their last year of study.

- Civil Litigation
- Notary Law
- Ethics and Professional Responsibility
- Special Education Students Rights
- Sexual Orientation and Gender Identity Discrimination
- Immigration Law
- Environmental Law
- Criminal Law
- Historic Buildings Protection
- Alternative Methos for Conflict and Disputes Resolution
- Intellectual Property and Entrepreneurship Law
- Mortgage Foreclosure Prevention and Debtor Protection
- Bankruptcy

== Admissions ==
For the class entering in 2024, the school accepted 49.23% of applicants, with 80.00% of those accepted enrolling. The median enrollee had a 148 LSAT score and 3.73 undergraduate GPA. The class's 25th/75th percentile LSAT scores and GPAs were 144/153 and 3.52/3.88.

=== Admissions processes ===
The School of Law accepts students based on their academic percentile. This percentile is tabulated by combining two basic criteria: the student's bachelor's degree cumulative GPA, as per the calculations of the Law School Admission Council (LSAC) and their LSAT results. The two criteria receive the same weight at the time of calculating the numeric ranking. Admission is offered to the best ranking students.

15 spaces are offered to the applicants selected by the admissions committee recommendations, chosen from a group composed of the 60 applicants following the students admitted. Throughout this process, the committee evaluates the personal statement and writing sample, and any socioeconomic disadvantages, academic achievement, graduate studies, propensity towards academic progress, publications, extracurricular activities, and other aspects which show student's aptitude for the study of Law.

== Post-graduation employment ==
According to the University of Puerto Rico's 2013 ABA-required disclosures, 18.24% of the Class of 2013 obtained full-time, long-term, JD-required employment nine months after graduation, excluding solo practitioners. The University of Puerto Rico's Law School Transparency under-employment score is 40.6%, indicating the percentage of the Class of 2013 unemployed, pursuing an additional degree, or working in a non-professional, short-term, or part-time job nine months after graduation.

ABA Employment Summary for 2013 Graduates
Employment Status	Percentage
Employed - Bar Passage Required	22.34%
Employed - J.D. Advantage	17.77%
Employed - Professional Position	11.17%
Employed - Non-Professional Position	0.51%
Employed - Undeterminable	0.0%
Pursuing Graduate Degree Full Time	3.05%
Unemployed - Start Date Deferred	2.03%
Unemployed - Not Seeking	10.15%
Unemployed - Seeking	27.41%
Employment Status Unknown	5.58%
Total of 197 Graduates

== Noted graduates ==
Three governors of Puerto Rico are graduates of the law school: Rafael Hernández Colón, Carlos Romero Barceló, and Aníbal Acevedo Vila. Also, Puerto Rico Supreme Court Chief Justices Luis Negrón Fernández, Pedro Pérez Pimentel, Miriam Naveira Merly, Víctor Manuel Pons Núñez, José Antonio Andréu García, Liana Fiol Matta, and Maite D. Oronoz Rodríguez, as well as Associate Justices Borinquen Marrero Ríos, Emilio Sastreño Belaval Maldonado, Rafael Hernández Matos, Carlos Santana Becerra, Raúl Serrano Geyls, Luis Blanco Lugo, Carlos Víctor Dávila Dávila, Marco Antonio Rigau Gaztambide, Hiram Torres Rigual, Héctor Martínez Muñoz, Armindo Cadilla Ginorio, Jorge Díaz Cruz, Carlos Juan Irizarry Yunqué, Antonio S. Negrón García, Francisco Rebollo López, Peter Ortiz Gustafson, Rafael Alonso Alonso, Jaime B. Fuster Berlingeri, Baltasar Corrada del Río, Anabelle Rodríguez Rodríguez, Rafael L. Martínez Torres, Mildred G. Pabón Charneco, Erick V. Kolthoff Caraballo, Edgardo Rivera García, Roberto Feliberti Cintrón, and Luis F. Estrella Martínez.

== Faculty ==
Former gubernatorial candidates Rubén Berríos and Fernando Martín García are among the law school's lecturers.

Other professors and lecturers have included Santos P. Amadeo, Vivian Neptune, Hiram Meléndez Juarbe, Carlos Díaz Olivo, Puerto Rico Supreme Court Chief Justice Liana Fiol Matta, and Antonio García Padilla.

Visiting speakers have included United States Supreme Court Justices Antonin Scalia, Ruth Bader Ginsburg, Stephen Breyer, Sonia Sotomayor, and professors Laurence Tribe of Harvard Law School, Owen Fiss of Yale Law School and the late Ferdinand Stone of Tulane Law School.

== Deans ==
Some of the deans include:

	Name	Start Term	End Term	Years in Position	Notes
1	José Benedicto y Géigel	1913	1917	3–4	As Director.
2	Rafael Martínez Álvarez	1917	1944	26–27	Director until 1925, then position was renamed to Dean.
3	Manuel Rodríguez Ramos		1960		Named Dean Emeritus.
4	David Helfeld	1961	1974	12–13	
5	Jaime B. Fuster	1974	1978	3–4	
6	Carlos G. Cadilla	1978	1986		
7	Antonio García Padilla	1986	2001	14–15	Named Dean Emeritus on September 6, 2009.
8	Dr. Efrén Rivera Ramos	August 1, 2001	July 31, 2007	5 years, 364 days	
9	Dr. Roberto Aponte Toro	August 1, 2007	February 15, 2011	3 years, 198 days	
12	Vivián I. Neptune Rivera	August 8, 2011	Incumbent	14 years, 298 days	First female dean.

== Facilities ==
The UPR Law School Building was designed by architect Henry Klumb and inaugurated in 1962, replacing a converted tobacco storage facility which housed the Law school for many years. Built during David Helfeld's incumbency as Dean, it was extensively remodeled by architect Segundo Cardona, FAIA of Sierra Cardona Ferrer Architects under Antonio García Padilla's sixteen-year term (1986–2001) as the law school dean.

=== UPR Law School Building ===
UPR Law School Building
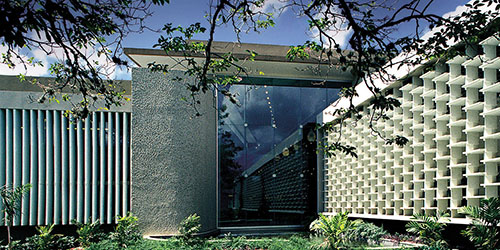
- Expansion to Law School Building
- Alternative names: Escuela de Derecho de la UPR

General information
- Type: Law School and Library
- Architectural style: Modernism
- Location: Río Piedras, San Juan, Puerto Rico
- Completed: 1961
- Inaugurated: 1962
- Client: University of Puerto Rico

Technical details
- Structural system: reinforced concrete, glass

Design and construction
- Architects: Henry Klumb, Segundo Cardona FAIA

The original Law School building of the University of Puerto Rico (UPR), built during David Helfeld's incumbency as Dean, replaced a converted tobacco storage facility which housed the Law school for many years. It was designed by Henry Klumb in 1961 and inaugurated in 1962. Klumb, a German architect and disciple of Frank Lloyd Wright, was based in Puerto Rico for the latter part of his life.

=== Law school expansion and new library ===
In 2001, the law school building was extensively remodeled and expanded under Antonio García Padilla's term as the law school dean. In the expansion of the Law School, it was decided to preserve the architecture of the original structure. The expansion project and new library were designed by Puerto Rican architect Segundo Cardona FAIA (Sierra Cardona Ferrer Architects), who had worked as student intern for Henry Klumb before becoming an architect.

The program for the project required a substantial expansion of the library and the faculty offices area, as well as construction of new facilities for the legal aid clinic and an updating of the infrastructure. The new structures were joined to the original building, preserving its architecture without concealing each unit. The reception and security areas of the library form an open space onto the exterior through a tall glass façade. The inauguration of the new library and expansion was on January 24, 2001

The design for the expansion won the 2001 Honor Award in the VI Bienal de Arquitectura - Colegio de Arquitectos y Arquitectos Paisajistas de Puerto Rico.

== See also ==
- University of Puerto Rico, Rio Piedras Campus
- Rio Piedras
