= Córdova Congressional Internship Program =

Publicly funded internship managed by Puerto Rico legislature

The Córdova & Fernós Congressional Internship Program is a publicly funded internship program created in 1993 through legislation authored by then Puerto Rico senator and former Secretary of State Kenneth McClintock and signed into law by Gov. Pedro Rosselló. Administered by a joint committee of the Puerto Rico Legislative Assembly and run by The Washington Center for Internships and Academic Seminars (TWC), the program provides the opportunity every year for 40 college students to experience a semester-long internship in an assigned congressional office of either chamber, in the Puerto Rico Federal Affairs Administration, or at Telemundo or Univision. By law, placement preference is given to the offices of Puerto Rico's Resident Commissioner, currently Pablo José Hernández (D-PR), and of congressmen of Puerto Rican heritage, including former Rep. José Serrano (D-NY), Luis Gutierrez (D-IL) Nydia Velázquez (D-NY) and Raúl Labrador (R-ID).

Originally named in honor of former Resident Commissioners Félix Córdova Dávila, who served from 1917 to 1932, and his son, Jorge Luis Córdova-Díaz, who served from 1969 to 1972, the program was renamed as "Córdova & Fernós" to also honor former Resident Commissioner Antonio Fernós Isern. Both Córdovas also served as Associate Justices of the Supreme Court of Puerto Rico while Fernós presided Puerto Rico's Constitutional Convention from 1951 to 1952.

By 2012, over 670 students from colleges and universities in Puerto Rico had enjoyed internships under the program, and the Spring 2009 class included a record 24 members.

A private sector committee, recently headed by Univision Puerto Rico president Larry Sands, provides private funds to supplement the $350,000 annual grant provided by the Puerto Rico Legislative Assembly.

Under the auspices of TWC, seventeen states have since established similar legislative-funded Congressional internship programs. The center established in 2008 the McClintock Award to the State Legislator of the Year, honoring the Córdova & Fernós Congressional Internship Program founder Kenneth McClintock, who received the first annual award on December 17, 2008, days before the end of his 28-year legislative career, sixteen as a senator, and the beginning of his service as the U.S. territory's Secretary of State.

== Córdova/Fernós Joint Committee Chairs ==
- Kenneth McClintock (1993–2000)
- José Ortiz Dalliot (2001–2004)
- José Garriga Picó (2005)
- Orlando Parga (2005–2008)
- Margarita Nolasco (2009)
- Melinda Romero Donnelly (2009–2012)

== Prominent Córdova/Fernós alumni ==
- Eduardo Arosemena, Former Assistant to the Secretary of State of Puerto Rico
- Phillip Arroyo, In-House Investigator, Morgan & Morgan Law Firm (2014-), Intern, Office of the Vice President of the United States, The White House (2012), Federal and Intergovernmental Affairs Assistant to the Secretary of State of PR (2009–2013), National Chairman, Hispanic Caucus - Young Democrats of America (2012–2013), State Chair, Puerto Rico Young Democrats (2010–2013)
- Carlos Saavedra Gutiérrez, former Secretary of Labor and Human Resources of Puerto Rico, former Law Clerk at Supreme Court of Puerto Rico, Editor in Chief of the Puerto Rico Lawyers' Association Law Review.
- Mikhail Blancovitch, National Treasurer of the Puerto Rico Statehood Students Association
- Joel Cruz Hiraldo, Puerto Rico Court of First Instance Municipal Judge (2010–2012), Superior Court Judge (2012-)
- José L. Fernández, The Washington Center Córdova/Fernós Program Coordinator (2010-)
- Javier Llano, Legislative Assistant, Puerto Rico Federal Affairs Administration (2009-)Partner, Oldaker Group LLC
- Yanira Martínez, deputy director, Governor's Federal Affairs Office (2009–2011)
- Marisol Felix Harney, Social Security Administration, Washington, DC Metropolitan Area, Systems Coordinator, 2004–Present
- Jennifer Marcial Ocasio, works for Univision Puerto Rico as an Online Publisher, Univisionpr.com
- Joel Montalvo, Executive Assistant to Gov. Aníbal Acevedo Vilá (2005–2008)
- Joceline Negrón, National Secretary of the Puerto Rico Statehood Students Association
- José Luis Notario, Chief Legislative Advisor, Senate of Puerto Rico (2005–2008)
- Ramón Orta, first Córdova member of the Cabinet, Secretary-designate of Sports and Recreation
- Max Pérez, Public Safety Advisor to Gov. Fortuño (2010–2011), Assistant State Superintendent of Police (2011-)
- Luis Roberto Rivera, Executive Assistant to Gov. Luis Fortuño (2009–10), Asst. Secretary of Housing, Puerto Rico (2010–2012), Commissioner of Municipal Affairs (first agency head) (2011–2012)
- Carlos Rodríguez, Legal Counsel to the Governor (2011–2012)
- Luis Román, Assistant Attorney General of Puerto Rico (2009–2011), Solicitor General (2011–2012)
- Steven Santiago, first Córdova intern (spring 1995), Auditor, Department of Defense
- Edwin R. Viñas López, Capital City of San Juan, Attorney (2008-) and Puerto Rico Labor Relations Board Associate Member (2011-).
- Angelique Velez de Sina, Special Assistant to the Honorable Pedro Pierluisi Resident Commissioner United States Congress 2010-2012 Advisor World Bank Group International Finance Corporation
- Javier Torres Camacho, Federal Affairs and Media Assistant to Puerto Rico State Senator Eduardo Bhatia (2012-), Puerto Rico Young Democrats Member.
- Luis A. Gonzalez-Arocho, President of the United Nations Association of the United States of America Students Alliance, at the University of Puerto Rico-Mayaguez (2010–2012); Secretary and Treasurer of the Phi Alpha Delta Pre-Law Fraternity, Jose Trias-Monge Chapter; President of the Puerto Rico Statehood Students Association, UPR-M Chapter (2011–2013); President and Founder of Juventud Progresista at UPR-M (2012–2013); National Secretary of the Puerto Rico Statehood Students Association (2013-)
- Miosotis Soto, Communication Specialist at NASA Goddard Space Flight Center, Alumni in Residence of the Washington Center, co-founder of ReEnvision, Alumni and volunteer mentor of the Congressional Hispanic Caucus Institute, Cordova and Fernos, Federal Diversity Internship Initiative, Hispanic Association of Colleges and Universities, and the Benjamin A. Gilman Scholarship.
- Robert Vendel, Advisor to Gov. Ricardo Rosselló (2017–2019), Deputy Chief of Staff to Gov. Wanda Vázquez Garced (2019–2021) and Gov. Pedro Pierluisi (2021–2021), Interim Executive Director for AmeriCorps Puerto Rico (2021–2021), founder of the Puerto Rico Governor's Office Internship Program (Luis A. Ferré Executive Internship Program) and Principal Advisor to North Carolina Local Governments on Enterprise Technology and Innovation. (2021–2025). Currently IBMer (2026–Present) and Virginia State Board Member serving under Gov. Abigail D Spanberger (2026–Present).
- Aileen Cardona Arroyo, PhD, Vice President of Hart Research & Associates (2019–Present).
