= Pierluisi =

Pierluisi is a surname of Puerto Rican origin. Notable people with the surname include:

- José Jaime Pierluisi (1965–1994), Puerto Rican economicist
- Pedro Pierluisi (born 1959), Puerto Rican politician and lawyer, 189th Governor of Puerto Rico
