= Guillemard =

Guillemard is a surname. Notable people with the surname include:

- A. G. Guillemard (1845–1909), English rugby union player
- Andy Guillemard-Noble, Puerto Rican attorney
- Francis Henry Hill Guillemard (1852–1933), English writer
- Franck Guillemard (born 1975), French ice hockey player
- Laurence Guillemard (1862–1951), British colonial official
