= Nu Sigma Beta =

Puerto Rican collegiate fraternity

- ΝΣΒ
- Founded: 1937; 89 years ago University of Puerto Rico, Río Piedras Campus
- Type: Social
- Affiliation: CIPR; CIPFI
- Status: Active
- Scope: Regional
- Colors: White, Royal blue, and Gold
- Flower: Gardenia
- Chapters: 8
- Nickname: La Nu Sigma
- Headquarters: San Juan, Puerto Rico; United States
- Website: nusigmabeta.org

Nu Sigma Beta Fraternity (ΝΣΒ) is a Puerto Rican fraternity. It was established in October of 1937 at the University of Puerto Rico, Río Piedras campus, by 11 students from diverse backgrounds. It quickly expanded and 89 years later, there are chapters and zones all over the island and the United States.

== History ==
The eleven founding fathers were: (1) Pedro Urbiztondo, from Cataño; (2) Héctor Morell, from Camuy; (3) Baltasar Quiñones, from Aguada ; (4) Juan Pedrosa, from Guaynabo; (5) Santiago Ortiz, from Arroyo ; (6) Carios M. Vidal, from Río Piedras; (7) José Del Valle, from Guaynabo; (8) José A. Luina, from Fajardo; (9) Osvaldo Goyco, from Ponce; (10) Rubén Gaztambide, from Añasco; and (11) Juan A. Carrillo, from Yabucoa.

The fraternity's first board (Alpha Chapter) was composed of:

- Chancellor: Carlos M. Vidal
- Vice-Chancellor: Rubén Gaztambide Arrillaga
- Secretary: Baltasar Quiñones
- Treasurer: Juan Pedrosa
- Board Member: Héctor Morell

These members came together on the Rio Piedras Campus and decided to form their social fraternity based on the principles of appreciation, respect, and tolerance, among other qualities. Believing this, they established a non-profit organization to develop helpful community-oriented citizens, promoting sincere friendship and a sense of brotherhood. Nu Sigma Beta was established with a written constitution.

Shortly after it was established, they celebrated their first initiation ceremony. During this ceremony, seven students joined them. These new members were:

1. Ramon E. "Pito" Llovet
2. Pedro A. Mattei
3. Luís A. Berríos
4. Japhet Ramírez Ledesma
5. Jesús Mediavilla
6. José Garabis
7. Edwin Cortés García

The fraternity quickly expanded and grew in numbers. By 1939, the fraternity opened its second chapter at the UPR-Mayaguez, formerly known as CAAM. This chapter became known as the Beta chapter and the San Juan chapter became the Alpha chapter. The fraternity has continually grown and expanded to encompass almost all institutions of higher learning within Puerto Rico and some beyond. Today, more than 89 years after its founding, there have been new chapters created in the Dominican Republic and the United States. There are chapters in Florida, Washington D.C., Philadelphia and others; there are also zones in Orlando, Texas, and other states. Recently the fraternity organized the reopening of the Nu chapter at the Universidad Central del Este at San Pedro de Macorís There are also chapters in the University of Puerto Rico at Humacao and at the Pontifical Catholic University of Puerto Rico.

The fraternity's need to be organized at a central level, due to its expanding nature, led it to be divided into Zones and chapters. Those still in college are inducted into chapters, while those who are not in college or after the age of 28 are inducted into zones. Chapter members are transferred into zones upon completing their undergraduate and/or graduate studies.

In November 1957 together with Phi Sigma Alpha and Phi Eta Mu they founded a Greek letter umbrella organization Concilio Interfraternitario de Puerto Rico.

== Symbols ==
Nu Sigma Beta's colors are white, azur, and gold. Its flower is the gardenia.

== Preamble ==
"Animados por el propósito de crear una organización basada en la verdadera nobleza que encierra aquella amistad, inspirada en la lealtad, el compañerismo y para fomentar el desarollo de ciudadanos útiles a la comunidad. Establecemos esta Fraternidad, cuyo futuro confíamos al Todopoderoso."

== Toast ==
"Jamás existió en el mundo una hermandad tan franca y tan sincera entre hombres que se aprecian, se respetan, y se toleran hasta que seres conscientes de la hermandad, que Dios quisó que prevaleciera en el mundo, unieron sus destinos en un cariño profundo. Sigamos hoy proyectando nuestro optimismo para que siempre sea la misma. ¡Y demos tan solo un brindis: por el hombre, la hermandad, y la Nu Sigma!"

== Internal Governance ==
The fraternity is governed by a presiding or executive committee, composed primarily of the President, First Vice-President, Second Vice-President, General Secretary, and General Treasurer. It also has a separate body acting as the legislative and judicial branches, simultaneously. The Supreme Council is presided over by the Executive Secretary. The governing bodies can only take action based on the rules of the fraternity, but the executive decision relies on the General Assembly, which is composed of zone and chapter delegates. The Constitution may only be amended in General Assembly.

Chapters are governed by a body composed of a Chancellor, Vice-Chancellor, Treasurer, Secretary and two board members.

Zones are governed by a body composed of Director, Sub-Director, Treasurer, Secretary and two board members.

== Philanthropy ==
The fraternity is dedicated to the creation of outstanding citizens in their community. As a result, the fraternity has many community-based programs, such as drug prevention campaigns, charity sports tournaments, and blood drives for local hospitals and the American Red Cross. Members are active in their communities, participating in environmental campaigns like SCUBA Dogs. Nu Sigma Beta also holds an annual golf tournament benefiting Instituto Santa Ana y el Colegio Caliope and her organizations such as Ronald McDonald House, Hogar Niñito Jesus, United Way, and The Salvation Army.

== Chapters ==
=== Collegiate chapters ===
These are the collegiate chapters of the Nu Sigma Beta fraternity.

Chapter	Established	Institution	Location	Status	Ref.
Alpha	October 1937	University of Puerto Rico, Río Piedras Campus	Rio Piedras, Puerto Rico	Active	
Beta (RUM)	1939	University of Puerto Rico at Mayaguez	Mayaguez, Puerto Rico	Active	
Gamma	September 22, 1945	Interamerican University of Puerto Rico	San German, Puerto Rico	Active	
Delta (PUCPR)	1948	Pontificia Universidad Católica de Puerto Rico	Ponce, Puerto Rico	Active	
Epsilon	April 1946	Villanova University and Pennsylvania	Villanova, Pennsylvania	Inactive	
Zeta	1957–1967	George Washington University	Washington D.C	Inactive	
Omega	1949	University of Miami	Coral Gables, Florida	Inactive, Reissued	
Kappa	December 1958	University of Puerto Rico School of Medicine	San Juan, Puerto Rico	Inactive, Reissued	
Omicron	1958	Study Center of the Inter-American University in Arecibo	Arecibo, Puerto Rico	Inactive, Reissued	
Chi	1964–1967	University of Puerto Rico School of Law	Río Piedras, Puerto Rico	Inactive, Reissued	
Omega	1966–1972	Inter-American University of Hato Rey	Hato Rey, Puerto Rico	Inactive, Reissued	
Nu	1975–1986	Universidad Central del Este	San Pedro de Macoris, Dominican Republic	Inactive, Reissued	
Omega	1977–1980	Loyola University and Tulane University	New Orleans, Louisiana	Inactive, Reissued	
Kappa	1977	University of Puerto Rico at Cayey	Cayey, Puerto Rico	Active	(Note: This chapter started at the Cayey School of Medicine and the Cayey University College.)
Omega	1992	University of Puerto Rico at Humacao	Humacao, Puerto Rico	Active	
Omicrón	1958	University of Puerto Rico at Arecibo	Arecibo, Puerto Rico	Active	
Chi	2018	Florida State University	Tallahassee, Florida	Active	

=== Alumni chapters ===
These are the Zones or alumni chapters of the Nu Sigma Beta fraternity.

Chapter	Charter date and range	Location	Status	Ref.
Zona Alumni	2019	Mayaguez, Puerto Rico	Active	
Zona Arecibo		Arecibo, Puerto Rico	Active	
Zona Betances	1992	Mayaguez, Puerto Rico	Active	
Zona Borikén	2019	Dorado, Puerto Rico	Active	
Zona Cayey		Cayey, Puerto Rico	Active	
Zona Centro		Caguas, Puerto Rico	Active	
Zona Guajataca		Isabela, Puerto Rico	Active	
Zona Humacao		Humacao, Puerto Rico	Active	
Zona Kofresi	2019	Quebradillas, Puerto Rico	Active	
Zona Lajas		Lajas, Puerto Rico	Active	
Zona Miami		Miami, Florida	Active	
Zona Orlando		Orlando, Florida	Active	
Zona Ponce	1950	Ponce, Puerto Rico	Active	
Zona San Felipe	1997	San Juan, Puerto Rico	Active	
Zona San Juan	2019	San Juan, Puerto Rico	Active	
Zona San Patricio		San Juan, Puerto Rico	Active	
Zona Señorial	2019	Ponce, Puerto Rico	Active	
Zona Yauco		Yauco, Puerto Rico	Active	
Zona Las Americas	2023 (1946)	Through states in U.S.	Active	

== Notable members ==
- René Marqués - influential and renowned Puerto Rican short story writer, journalist, poet and playwright
- Ramon Torres - member of the Puerto Rico House of Representatives
- Rubén Berríos – three-time senator, lawyer, and president of the Puerto Rican Independence Party
- Luis Alfredo Colon Velanuez – senator 1944 to 1968, municipal judge of Lares 1943 to 1944
- Rafael Cordero Santiago – mayor of Ponce 1989 to 2004
- José Esteves – journalist with Telemundo Canal 2
- Pedro Ruben Gaztambide Arrillaga – former mayor of Río Piedras and member of the Constitutional Convention of Puerto Rico
- William "Willito" Miranda Torres – mayor of Caguas, Puerto Rico
- Jorge Pierluisi Diaz – former Secretary of Housing of Puerto Rico
- Pedro Pierluisi Urrutia – 14th Governor of Puerto Rico and the Resident commissioner of Puerto Rico in the United States House of Representatives
- Efraín Rivera Pérez – former member of the Supreme Court of Puerto Rico

== See also ==
- List of social fraternities and sororities
