= PRSSA =

PRSSA may refer to:

- President of the Royal Scottish Society of Arts
- Public Relations Student Society of America
- Puerto Rico Statehood Students Association
