= Ramón Orta =

Ramón Orta was the Secretary of Sports and Recreation in Puerto Rico. He was appointed by Governor Alejandro García Padilla in 2013. A native of Patillas, Puerto Rico and the son of a former judge, Orta is a graduate of the Sports Magnet School in Puerto Rico's Olympic training facility, the Albergue Olímpico located in Salinas, Puerto Rico.

While in college, Orta interned at the DC office of Congressman José E. Serrano as part of the Fall 2000 class of the Córdova Congressional Internship Program founded by then-Sen. Kenneth McClintock. In fact, Orta is the first Córdova alumni to be appointed to the Constitutional Cabinet in Puerto Rico.

At the time of his appointment, Orta was serving as Director of the Sports Federations Services Office at Puerto Rico's Olympic Committee (PROC) in San Juan.

On June 21, 2017, Orta was arrested with six other individuals by FBI agents for his supposed involvement in a fraud scheme involving federal funds.
