= Fernando Gil =

Fernando Gil may refer to:

- Fernando Gil-Enseñat, Puerto Rican politician and lawyer
- Fernando Gil (actor), Spanish actor
- Fernando Gil (philosopher), Portuguese philosopher and namesake of the Fernando Gil International Prize for the Philosophy of Science
