= Pooth =

Origin
- Language: German

Pooth is a German surname. Notable people with the surname include:

- Verona Pooth (born 1968), German television personality
