= Andy Guillemard-Noble =

Puerto Rican attorney

Andrés "Andy" Guillemard-Noble, is a Puerto Rican attorney who also serves as the majority owner and president of the Puerto Rico Islanders soccer team, and its spokesman in the local media.

== Football ==
One of the owners of the Puerto Rico Islanders, he was elected president of the club in 2006, and has been the public face of Puerto Rico's first professional soccer franchise and the U.S. territory's only professional team in a national league, since Puerto Rico does not have an MLB, NBA, NFL or NHL team. Guillemard has made it a point to demonstrate that a Puerto Rican team can excel nationally. In 2010, he became the majority owner after other owners sold their shares of the club to him as a way of meeting the new USSF D2 standards.

== Politics ==
A prominent supporter of statehood for Puerto Rico, during the 2008 Puerto Rico June 1 Democratic presidential primaries, he coordinated Barack Obama's unsuccessful campaign in Puerto Rico. He subsequently served as a member of the 2008 Democratic National Convention Platform Committee and was responsible for drafting the platform plank regarding Puerto Rico.

During the 2008 New Progressive Party primaries and general election he managed the campaign for his brother-in-law, and now Resident Commissioner, Pedro Pierluisi.

== Charities ==
Guillemard is the Vice President of the Jose Jaime Pierluisi Foundation, a charitable organization in Puerto Rico.
