= María Elena Batista =

Puerto Rican sports area administrator

María Elena ("Mari") Batista is a former sports administrator in Puerto Rico. As the city of San Juan, Puerto Rico's longest-serving Director of Sports and Recreation from January 2001, to January 2012, she helped revive the previously underused and dilapidated Hiram Bithorn Stadium, attracting MLB's Opening Day Game in 2001, twenty-two yearly home games of the now defunct Montreal Expos (now known as the Washington Nationals) in 2003 and 2004, the 2006 and 2009 World Baseball Classic games and a series of MLB New York Mets games in 2010. In the summer of 2006, she brought NBA's "Basketball Without Borders" program to San Juan. In September 2006, Mayor Jorge Santini inaugurated the San Juan Municipal Sports Magnet School. In December 2006, another of her projects, the $28 million San Juan Natatorium opened to the public and attracted winter training from over 10 stateside college swim teams, including the United States Military Academy. In March 2007 she personally began a campaign to rescue low-income youths who were dangerously diving off city bridges into polluted waters and introducing them to the diving facilities at the new Natatorium.

In July 2007, the first phase of San Juan's Golf complex and San Juan Golf Academy, a reuse of the city's former sanitary landfill, opened to the public. The first phase included a state-of-the-art Golf Academy and a driving range atop the former landfill with 360 degree views of the capital city. Batista has reportedly begun recruiting low-income children to begin golf training.

By 2008, Batista had helped attract several sports teams to San Juan, including two teams of the new Puerto Rico Soccer League and the Santurce Crabbers (Cangrejeros) baseball team. She is negotiating to bring the Crabbers as well as the San Juan Senators teams back to play in Bithorn Stadium for winter 2010.

In February 2010, Batista's department hosted the Latin American Regional Special Olympics, a two-week-long event that included over one thousand young athletes, and the presence of Dr. Timothy Shriver, CEO of the worldwide organization, and Martín Torrijos, former president of Panama. Santini and Batista traveled to Morocco later that year to put in a bid for San Juan to host the 2015 worldwide Special Olympics.

Prior to Batista's career as a sports administrator, she was a competitive swimmer, having represented Puerto Rico in several Central American and Caribbean Games, Pan American Games and the 1988 Olympics in Seoul, South Korea. After graduating from Puerto Rico's Sacred Heart University in 1994, she served as the Sports Director of Puerto Rico's Department of Education Sports Magnet School, located at the Puerto Rico Olympic Committee training facilities in Salinas, Puerto Rico, obtained an MBA and began teaching business administration at Turabo University in Caguas, Puerto Rico.

Batista is the daughter of former Superior Court Judge Elpidio Batista, who served a stint as President of the Puerto Rico Baseball Winter League. She is divorced from former Puerto Rico Secretary of State Kenneth McClintock. They are the parents of two children, Kevin Davison, a Georgetown University graduate, aspiring actor, and the National President of the Puerto Rico Statehood Students Association, born in 1995, and Stephanie Marie, a practicing physician born in 1997.

After serving as a professor at Turabo University in Gurabo, she now serves as the athletics director and as a business professor at Universidad del Sagrado Corazón in San Juan.

== Sources ==
- http://www.nba.com/bwb/bwb_pr.html
- http://www.miami.com/mld/miamiherald/sports/15719220.htm
- http://www.juventudboricua.com/foro/boricua-sports/3378-entrenar-en-la-isla.html
- https://web.archive.org/web/20070930021006/http://www.sanjuancapital.com/noticiasread.asp?r=53833ISB3D
- https://web.archive.org/web/20070930020953/http://www.sanjuancapital.com/noticiasread.asp?r=53866ISB4A
- https://web.archive.org/web/20070930110930/http://www.thesanjuannews.com/detalleNoticias.php?newsID=393
- https://web.archive.org/web/20070928132841/http://www.clasicomundial.com/news/news.php?id=697
- https://web.archive.org/web/20110711102515/http://espndeportes-att.espn.go.com/news/story?id=414995
- http://www.terra.com/deportes/articulo/html/fox228633.htm
