= Cimadevilla (surname) =

Cimadevilla is a surname. Notable people with the surname include:

- Francisco Cimadevilla (fl. 1983–2007), Puerto Rican journalist
- Jorge Cimadevilla (born 1965), American football player
- Mario Cimadevilla (born 1954), Argentine politician
