= José Rodríguez Suárez =

José Rodríguez Suárez, a co-founder of the Puerto Rico Statehood Students Association, is the longest-serving Deputy Secretary of State of Puerto Rico, having served under two governors, Pedro Rosselló and Luis Fortuño, and four Secretaries of State of Puerto Rico, Baltasar Corrada del Río, Norma Burgos and Angel Morey between 1993 and 2000, and Kenneth McClintock between 2009 and 2012. As such, he was charged with directing all intergovernmental and international activities of the Department during 12 of the Department's 60-year history.

A graduate of George Washington University, he obtained his Juris Doctor degree at the University of Puerto Rico School of Law, and has been in private practice when not in public service. His op-ed's appear frequently in national and local publications. He is a pro-statehood member of the New Party for Progress locally and a Republican nationally.

He was succeeded as Deputy Secretary of State on January 2, 2013 by Javier González.
