= Parliamentary Confederation of the Americas =

The Parliamentary Conference of the Americas, or COPA, was created in 1997 under the auspices of the United States' Council of State Governments and National Conference of State Legislatures, the Quebec National Assembly and a Brazilian legislative organization. The first Conference was held in Quebec City, Province of Quebec, in Canada, at which Jean Pierre Charboneau, the President of the Quebec National Assembly, was elected COPA's first President. The second Conference was held in Río Grande, Puerto Rico in the United States under the presidency of Puerto Rico Senator Kenneth McClintock, COPA's second President.

The necessity to create a hemispheric parliamentary organization became apparent at the first Summit of the Americas, held in Miami, Florida, US, in December 1994. The Summit brought together the Chief Executives of every country in the Americas except for Cuba, with no input from the parliamentary/legislative branches of those countries. Since its creation, COPA has been an observer and participant at every subsequent Summit of the Americas: Santiago, Chile; Quebec City, Canada; and Mar del Plata, Argentina.

COPA's membership includes all national and sub-national (provincial, state and territorial) parliamentarians or legislators from every country in the Western Hemisphere except Cuba. Among the organization's affiliates is the Women's Parliamentarian Network. COPA operates in four languages, Spanish, English, French and Portuguese.

For the first time since the II Conference in 2000, COPA's Executive Committee is scheduled to meet in the United States in late June (Los Angeles, California).

== Sources ==
- http://www.parl.gc.ca/Infoparl/english/issue.htm?param=63&art=56
- http://www.intute.ac.uk/socialsciences/cgi-bin/fullrecord.pl?handle=sosig969551395-19384
- http://www.copa.qc.ca
- http://csg.org
- http://ncsl.org
