= Jorge Pierluisi Diaz =

Puerto Rican politician (1927–2023)

Jorge “Georgie” Pierluisi Diaz (September 29, 1927 – May 26, 2023) was a Puerto Rican civil engineer, contractor, and politician. He was the Secretary of Housing of Puerto Rico for eight years.

== Early life ==
Pierluisi Diaz was born on September 29, 1927, in Ponce, Puerto Rico. He was a member of Nu Sigma Beta fraternity.

== Career ==
Pierluisi Diaz was started as a lieutenant in the United States Army. He worked as a construction inspection, chief inspector, and civil engineer in the Design Department of the Army Antilles Engineers, part of the United States Army Corps of Engineers. He became a general contractor and developer who constructed hospitals, hotels, housing, industrial buildings, office buildings, and shopping centers in Puerto Rico.

He was the Secretary of Housing of Puerto Rico under the administration of Governor Carlos Romero Barceló, between 1977 and 1984. He then became a mediator, and arbitrator and was a member of the Panel of Arbitrators of the American Arbitration Association.

Pierluisi Diaz was a president of the Puerto Rican chapter of the Associated General Contractors of America, who awarded him the Alejandro Herrero Award. He also belonged to the Puerto Rican College of Engineers and Surveyors.

== Personal life ==
Pierluisi Diaz married Doris Herlinda Urrutia Renta on June 16, 1951. They had four children, Caridad, Doris, Jorge, and Pedro. Pedro Rafael Pierluisi Urrutia was Governor of Puerto Rico from 2021 to 2025. When Doris was diagnosed with Alzheimer's disease in 2013, Pierluisi Diaz became her caregiver.

Pierluisi Diaz died on May 26, 2023, at the age of 95 after being hospitalized for several days. He was buried in the Puerto Rico National Cemetery in Bayamón, Puerto Rico.
