= Joseph M. Mendiola =

Northern Mariana Islands politician

Joseph M. Mendiola was a member of the Senate of the Commonwealth of the Northern Mariana Islands (CNMI). He represented the second senatorial district of Tinian & Aguiguan and was a member of the CNMI Covenant Party.

As Senate President of the 15th CNMI Legislature (2006–2008), Senator Mendiola co-founded the Outlying Areas Senate Presidents Caucus with his counterparts from Guam, Hawaii, Alaska, and Puerto Rico in December 2007.
