= Verona Pooth =

German television personality (born 1968)

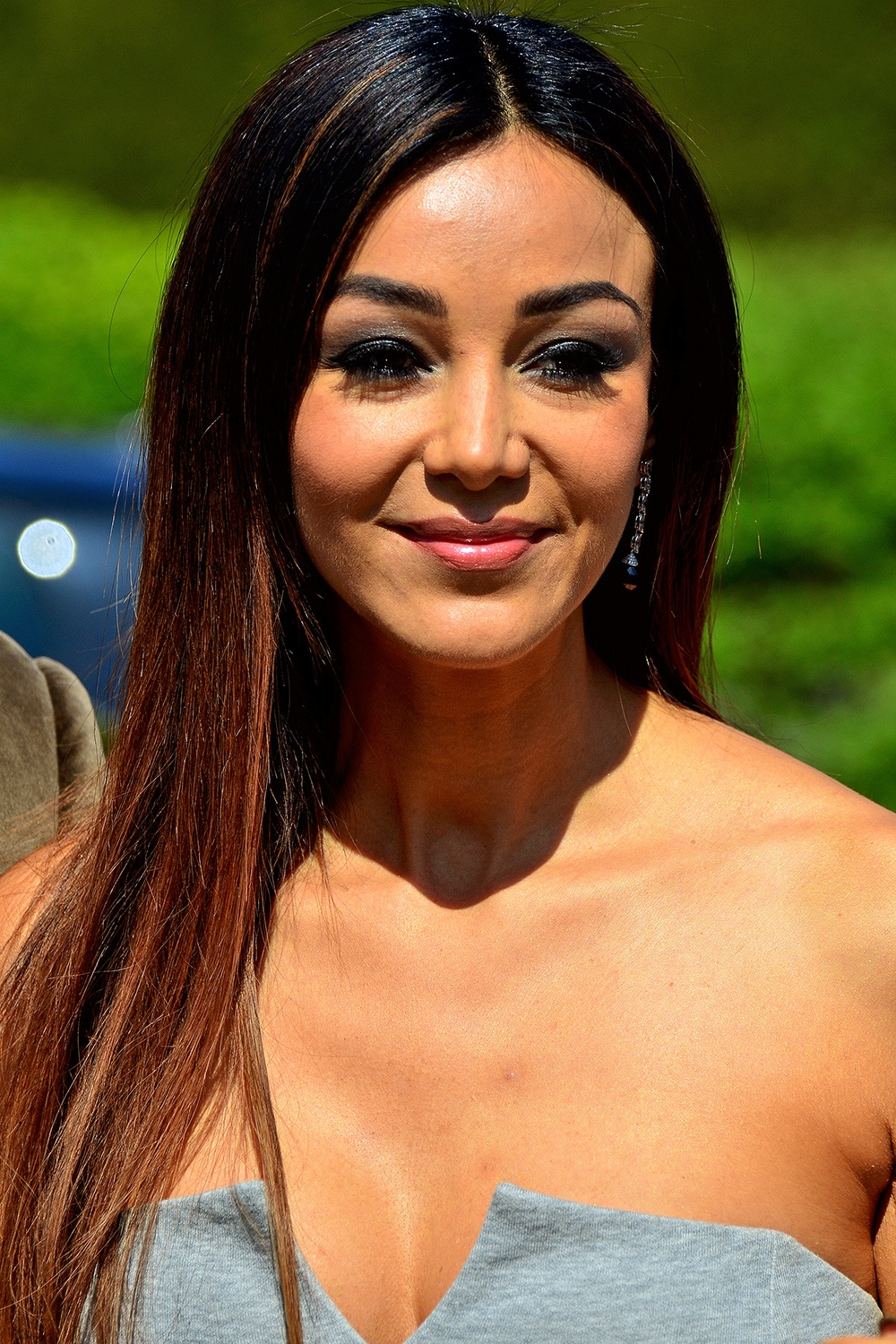
- Pooth in 2013
- Born: Verona Feldbusch; 30 April 1968 (age 58); La Paz, Bolivia
- Occupations: Television personality, model, actress
- Spouses: Dieter Bohlen (m. 1996; div. 1997); Franjo Pooth (m. 2004)
- Children: 2

Verona Pooth (née Feldbusch; born 30 April 1968) is a German actress, television host, model and beauty pageant titleholder who was crowned Miss Germany 1993 and Miss Intercontinental 1993 and represented Germany at the Miss Universe 1993.

== Early life ==
Pooth was born Verona Feldbusch in La Paz, Bolivia, to German engineer Ernst Feldbusch and Bolivian hairdresser Luisa Feldbusch (1935–2015). Her parents were divorced in 1978. Pooth grew up with her mother in Hamburg, her father's hometown.

== Career ==
=== Beauty pageants ===
Pooth took part in several beauty pageants in the 1990s. She won the finals of the following beauty contests: Miss Hamburg (1992), Miss Germany (1993), Miss Intercontinental (1993), and Miss American Dream (1995).

=== Film and television ===
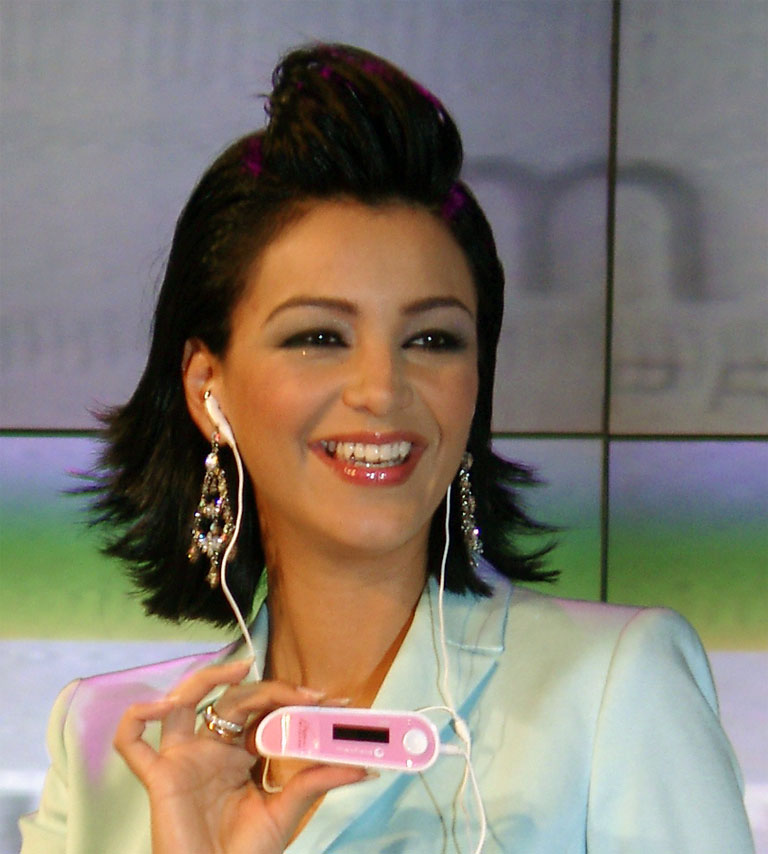
Pooth in 2004

Pooth hosted the erotic TV show Peep from 1996 to 1999 and her own late-night comedy talkshow Veronas Welt from 1998 to 2000. In 1998, she appeared in one episode of the US series Conan the Adventurer. Pooth made her film debut in On the Wings of Love in 1999 and acted in several more movies in the 1990s and 2000s. She has dubbed certain cartoon characters since 2005, first time in the film Chicken Little.

Pooth presented the scripted reality TV shows The Swan – endlich schön! (2004) and Engel im Einsatz – Mit Verona Pooth (2008). She was part of the jury in the TV show Pool Champions – Promis unter Wasser (2013) and offered private insights into her family's life and education in the show 6 Mütter (2017).

Pooth received the German Bambi Award in 2004 and 2006.

=== Other ventures ===
In 1990, Pooth was asked to join the music group Chocolate, and performed the single "Ritmo de la noche".

She served as the spokesperson for several advertising campaigns on TV, such as for Telegate, Iglo, for the Expo 2000, and for KiK.

Pooth created her own fashion collections in Hamburg 1990 under the label Immerschön. From 2002 to 2004, she merchandised jewelry and lingerie under the label Veronas Dreams. Since 2007, she owns the cosmetic brand So ... perfect.

== Personal life ==
In August 1996, Pooth married German entertainer and musician Dieter Bohlen. The marriage was dissolved in May 1997. In 2004, she married Franjo Pooth, a German entrepreneur. They have two sons, San Diego and Rocco Ernesto.

== Filmography ==
Year	Title	Role	Director
1999	On the Wings of Love	Ricarda	Gabriel Barylli
1999	Heirate mir!	Malgorzata Kawalerowicz	Douglas Wolfsperger
2000	2001: A Space Travesty	Yetta Pussel	Allan A. Goldstein
2001	Driven	Nina	Renny Harlin
2002	666 – Traue keinem, mit dem du schläfst!	as herself	Rainer Matsutani
2005	Chicken Little	Abigail "Abby" Mallard (voice) (German version)	Mark Dindal
