= Franjo Pooth =

German businessman (born 1969)

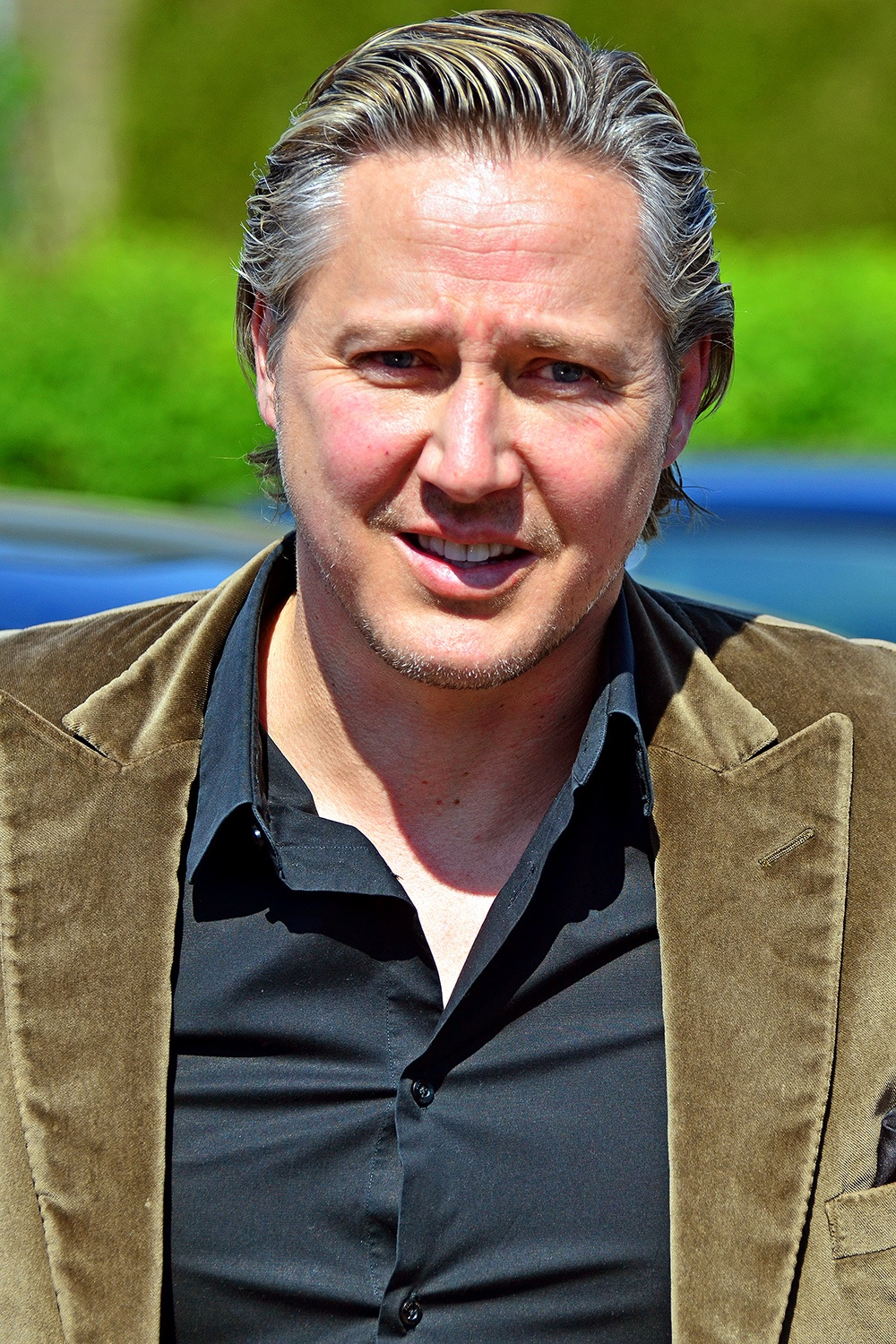
- Pooth in 2013
- Born: 20 July 1969 (age 57); Meerbusch, West Germany
- Occupation: Businessman
- Spouse: Verona Feldbusch (m. 2004)
- Children: 2

Franjo Pooth (born July 20, 1969) is a German businessman and former CEO of Maxfield.

== Early life ==
Pooth was born on July 20, 1969, and is originally from Meerbusch, a city near Düsseldorf. His father is the architect Franz-Josef Pooth. Franjo Pooth went to the Mataré-School in Meerbusch and the Otto-Kühne-School in Bonn. His brother Mano is also a businessman.

== Business ==
After his studies at the Architectural Association School of Architecture in London, Pooth joined the Firstgate Internet AG (subsidiary company of Deutsche Telekom in Cologne. He then founded the brand agency MPFC, together with his partners Coordt von Mannstein and Patrik Graf von Faber Castell.

In 2003, Pooth founded the consumer electronic brand Maxfield, whose core business was to produce unique designed MP3 players and trend-orientated electronic devices in the European market. Pooth was its CEO until 2008 and was the finalist of the 2006 Ernst & Young Entrepreneur of the Year Award contest, representing Maxfield GmbH.

In 2009, Franjo Pooth was sentenced to one year on probation and a €100,000 fine by a court in Düsseldorf due to corruption and bribery. He was convicted of having bribed key personnel of the bank Sparkasse Düsseldorf to sign off on bank loans for his company Maxfield GmbH.

== Personal life ==
Pooth has been married to German television personality Verona Pooth since 2004. They have two children together, San Diego (b. September 10, 2003) and Rocco Ernesto (b. June 4, 2011).
