= Fernando Gil-Enseñat =

Secretary of Housing of Puerto Rico

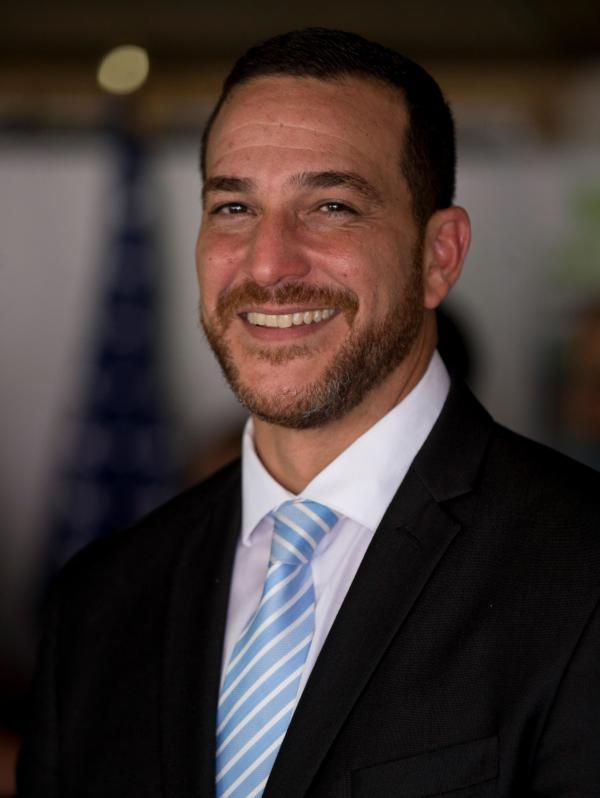

Secretary of Housing of Puerto Rico
- In office January 2, 2017 – January 19, 2020
- Appointed by: Ricardo Rosselló
- Preceded by: Alberto Lastra Power

Personal details
- Born: Fernando Arturo Gil Enseñat; Mayaguez, Puerto Rico
- Political party: PNP
- Education: University of Puerto Rico (BA); Pontifical Catholic University of Puerto Rico School of Law (JD); American University (LLM)

Fernando Arturo Gil-Enseñat (Note: In this Spanish name, the first or paternal surname is Gil and the second or maternal family name is Enseñat.) is a Puerto Rican politician and lawyer. He was the secretary of housing of Puerto Rico under Ricardo Rosselló administration, until January 19, 2020.

Gil-Enseñat was born in Mayaguez, Puerto Rico. Before being appointed Secretary, he served as the Associated Administrator for acquisition and contracting in the Public Housing Administration of Puerto Rico. Fernando Gil has a bachelor's degree in political science from the University of Puerto Rico at Mayaguez, a Juris Doctor from the Pontifical Catholic University of Puerto Rico and studies at master's degree in private international law at Washington College of Law.

In February 2019, Gil-Enseñat was also answering questions as to why the Foundation for Puerto Rico received a large block of the grant money for rebuilding and reconstructing without going through a normal bidding process.

As of September 2019, two years after Hurricane Maria, Gil-Enseñat was negotiating the distribution of funds for island reconstruction and relief for homeowners who lost their homes or home's roof. Release of funds has been mired in delays: first by a U.S. government shutdown, then by HUD wanting to audit the administration of funds after Governor Ricardo Rosselló's Telegate scandal and resignation. Recommendations for how to satisfy eligibility requirements for the CDBG-DR (what the grant is called) were recommended in a letter addressed to Gil-Enseñat, in March 2018, by the National Low Income Housing Coalition.

While hundreds of thousands of homes were damaged or destroyed— repairing or replacing the roofs is a monumental undertaking in any situation, but one that is particularly daunting in Puerto Rico, where many homes are built “informally,” without permits or titles. Qualifying for the Federal Emergency Management Agency's individual assistance program requires proof of homeownership, leaving many hurricane survivors ineligible because they have no deeds, leases, or mortgages. Gil-Enseñat was quoted as saying that until a recent meeting, treatment of Puerto Rico seemed unfair and discriminatory and that many of the requirements make accessing the relief funds extremely difficult.
