= Caribbean and Central America Action =

Non-profit organization

Caribbean and Central American Action was a 501(c)(3) non-profit organization which has hosted the annual Miami Conference on the Caribbean & Central America for 33 years.

The organization had a multinational Board of Trustees, currently headed by Cornelius B. Prior Jr., and was based in Washington, DC.

Among the public figures speaking at the 33rd conference, held in 2009 in Miami, were the Prime Minister of Haiti, Jean-Max Bellerive, Canada's Minister of State of Foreign Affairs, Peter Kent and Puerto Rico Secretary of State, Kenneth McClintock. The organization's policy-oriented programs have focused on tourism, financial services, policy and regulatory environments for business in the Americas, energy security, maritime port security, disaster mitigation, customs, telecommunications, intellectual property rights, information technology, agriculture and telecommunications. Cabinet-level officials have represented the United States at prior conferences.

The organization has closed.

== Sources ==
- About CCAA
- CCAA Profile
