= Julio Cabral Corrada =

Puerto Rican investment banker and social advocate

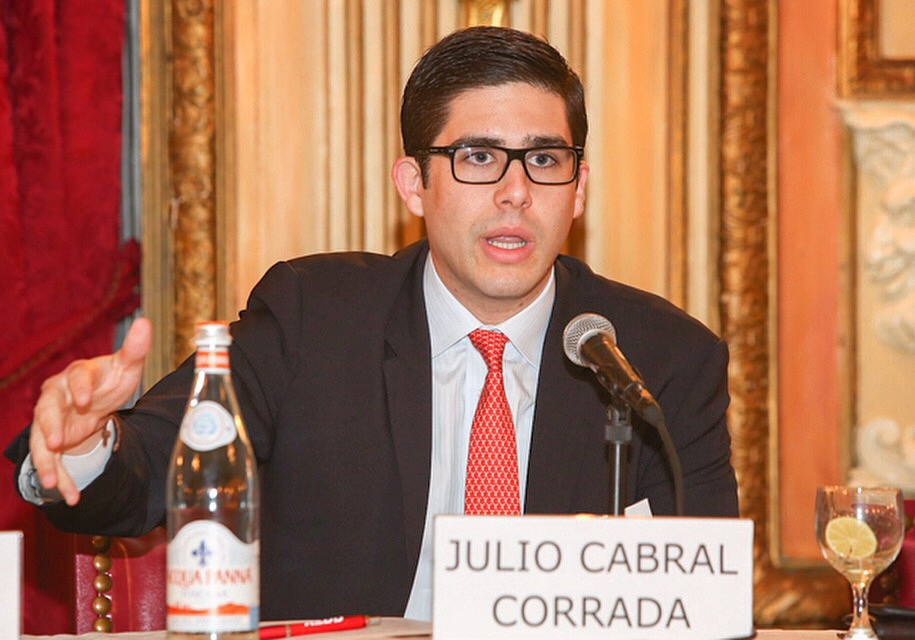
- Born: Julio A. Cabral Corrada; San Juan, Puerto Rico
- Education: Harvard University, University of Pennsylvania's Wharton School and Cornell University
- Occupation: Finance · Policy · Social

Julio A. Cabral Corrada is an entrepreneur, social advocate and policy advisor from Puerto Rico. He focuses on Latin America and Puerto Rico's fiscal, economic, and political affairs.

== Early life and education ==
Cabral Corrada was born and raised in San Juan, Puerto Rico. He graduated with honors in 2009 from Colegio San Ignacio de Loyola.

In 2013, he graduated Dean's List from Cornell University, where he focused on business and government studies. He was a member of the Alpha Kappa Psi business society and the Sigma Alpha Epsilon social fraternity. In 2012, he was a Hansard Scholar at the London School of Economics, where he studied economics and politics and completed his academic thesis on the European debt crisis.

In 2020, he earned his MBA as a Howard E. Mitchell Fellow in the Wharton School of the University of Pennsylvania in Philadelphia. In 2019, while at Wharton, he worked at the Lauder Institute under Professor Mauro Guillén and organized the first Ivy League conference to take place in Puerto Rico. Also, he was a weekly contributor in the SiriusXM Wharton Channel discussing socioeconomic and policy events in the U.S. and Latin America.

Afterwards, in 2021, Cabral Corrada earned a Master's Degree in policy and management from Harvard University. In 2021, while at Harvard, Cabral Corrada was appointed as a Bloomberg Harvard City Leadership Initiative Equitable Development Manager. In his role, he advised local and international public leaders on economic, education, and policy issues, including the mayor of Santo Domingo, Dominican Republic, Carolina Mejía.

== Professional career ==
Cabral Corrada worked as an Investment Vice President at Stone Lion Capital, a multi-billion dollar investment fund. He performed financial analysis on credit and equity investments across Latin America and emerging markets. Cabral Corrada has also served as an intermediary between the Puerto Rico government and investors in the high-profile $70 billion debt restructuring. Prior to that, he was an Institutional Analyst in Morgan Stanley's Institutional Equity Trading Group. In addition, he served in the United Kingdom’s Parliament's Scrutiny Unit as a Financial Analyst and as the Director of Strategy of Telemundo’s Premios Tu Musica Urbanos.

During the Puerto Rican government-debt crisis, Cabral Corrada appeared in panel discussions to discuss the islands' fiscal and economic state, calling for a good-faith renegotiation of the debt, economic development, public–private partnerships, improvement in collection of existing taxes, and fiscal reforms. At the federal level, he advocates for parity in Medicaid and Medicare federal funding, access to Chapter 9 bankruptcy protection currently available to U.S. states, and exemption from the maritime cabotage legislation known as the Jones Act.

== Philanthropy and activism ==
=== Community and social involvement ===
In the aftermath of Hurricane Irma and María, Cabral Corrada co-founded Puerto Rico Rising. The non-profit effort raised over 5 million pounds of food and supplies among 20 U.S. mainland cities and distributed it, in coordination with other organizations, to feed and supply over 200,000 affected residents of Puerto Rico.

Cabral Corrada sits on the board of directors of the YoNoMeQuito Social Foundation. As reported by NBC News in May 2016, "the goal of the movement is to spread positive energy and motivate 'borícuas', as Puerto Ricans are known, to keep moving forward despite the islands' recent challenges".

During the COVID-19 pandemic in Puerto Rico, he served as a volunteer of the National Guard, assisting senior officers with logistics and analysis.

Cabral Corrada is the youngest member of the annual stewardship board of the Museo de Arte de Ponce in Ponce, Puerto Rico.

=== Political involvement ===
Cabral Corrada has been an advocate of statehood for Puerto Rico. In 2013, after serving as executive director of the Puerto Rico Statehood Students Association, Cabral Corrada was appointed to the organization's board of advisors.

In 2012, he served as the co-director of former Governor Luis Fortuño's absentee ballot campaign.

== Personal life ==
Cabral Corrada is the eldest son of Julio Cabral and Mercedes Corrada, who are in business and philanthropy. He is a grand-nephew of the late Baltasar Corrada del Rio, who was Mayor of San Juan, Resident Commissioner, Secretary of State, Lieutenant Governor of Puerto Rico and Associate Justice of the Supreme Court of Puerto Rico.
