= Outlying Areas Senate Presidents Caucus =

Informal legislative body created in 2007

The Outlying Areas Senate Presidents Caucus is an informal legislative body created in 2007, by leaders of the Senates of the U.S. states of Alaska and Hawaii, and the US territories of Guam, Puerto Rico, and the Northern Marianas Islands. (Note: Leaders from areas outside the continental United States (OCONUS) declare an alliance. Members of the offshore group are Hawaii Senate President Colleen Hanabusa, Alaska Senate Majority Leader Gary Stevens, Guam Senator Eddie Baza Calvo and the Northern Marianas Senate President Joseph Mendiola.) The organization's inaugural meeting took place in Hawaii's State Capitol on December 11, 2007. It was attended by Hawaii Senate President Colleen Hanabusa, Alaska Senate Majority Leader Gary Stevens, Guam Legislature Acting Speaker Eddie Baza Calvo, Senate President Joseph Mendiola of the Commonwealth of the Northern Marianas Islands and Puerto Rico Senate President Kenneth McClintock, who convened the meeting. (Note: By May 2008, Senate President Usie Richards of the US Virgin Islands had joined the Caucus)

== History ==
The Caucus was created to develop the first dialogue ever among legislative leaders of the United States' outlying states and territories, identify common problems, many of which are not shared by the forty-eight contiguous states, and seek consensus regarding possible solutions. The issues initially discussed include the less-than-equal treatment by Federal agencies and private corporations, the lack of coverage of FCC-licensed satellite radio services in the non-contiguous areas of the nation and, with the exception of Alaska and Hawaii, their non-inclusion in the 50 State Quarters program.

As a result of efforts by several caucus members, including a letter by them to the Federal Communications Commission (FCC) included in the XM/Sirius merger docket, Sirius committed to take steps within 90 days of FCC approval of the merger to provide coverage to the most populated outlying areas. Since 2009, the Sirius/XM signal has been available to subscribers in Puerto Rico.
