= Puerto Rico government transition process =

Transfer of power between Puerto Rico governors

Process overview
- Formed: ad hoc after a new Governor is elected
- Jurisdiction: executive branch
- Headquarters: Department of State
- Annual budget: not less than $600,000 USD
- Child agencies: Outgoing Committee on Government Transition; Incoming Committee on Government Transition
- Key document: Law No. 197 of 2002
- Website: www.transicionpuertorico.com

The Puerto Rico government transition process is the process followed by the executive branch of the government of Puerto Rico when it must transition from one governor to another. The process is handled by two committees:

- the Outgoing Committee on Government Transition, composed of government officers from the incumbent administration, and
- the Incoming Committee on Government Transition, composed of aides and assistants of the upcoming governor-elect.

Puerto Rican law establishes that the committees meet in public hearing whenever in session except when discussing confidential information.

== Background and regulation ==
Historically, the transition of government was carried out on the basis of what had been custom and tradition without any formal regulation. This resulted in grants of contracts and auctions during the transition period, thus compromising the budget of the upcoming government.

Law No. 197 of 2002 declared by the 14th Legislative Assembly of Puerto Rico, thereafter established and regulated the transitioning process, and set forth the tasks and obligations to be performed by the different government agencies. The law also established that the process must begin four working days after the general election, and conclude by or before December 31. It also established which government officers shall be part of the Outgoing Committee on Government Transition. The law also empowered the governor-elect to file a mandamus in the Supreme Court of Puerto Rico shall the incumbent government refuse to comply with the law.
