= Kenneth McClintock =

American politician (born 1957)

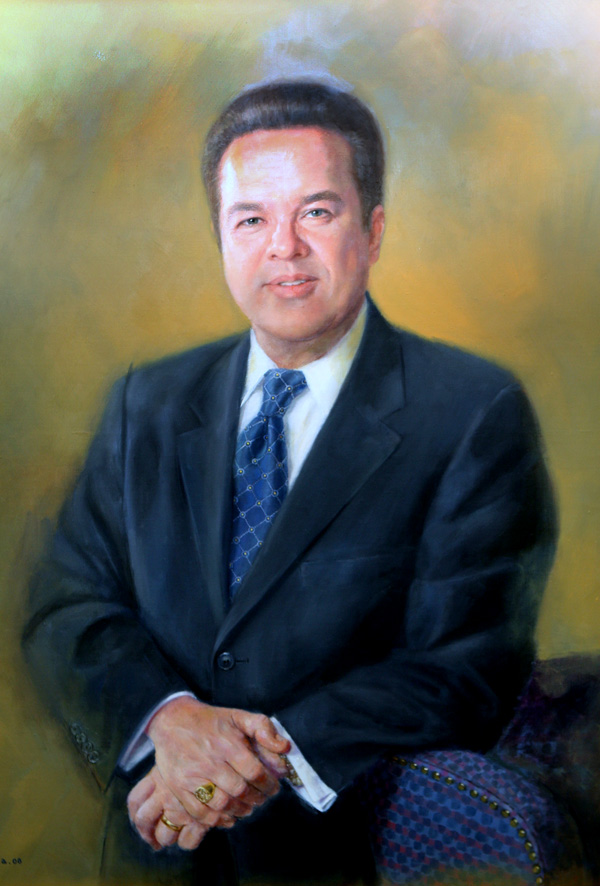

Secretary of State of Puerto Rico
- In office January 2, 2009 – January 2, 2013
- Governor: Luis Fortuño
- Preceded by: Fernando J. Bonilla
- Succeeded by: David Bernier

13th President of the Senate of Puerto Rico
- In office January 10, 2005 – December 31, 2008
- Governor: Aníbal Acevedo Vilá
- Preceded by: Antonio Fas Alzamora
- Succeeded by: Thomas Rivera Schatz

Member of the Senate of Puerto Rico from the At-large district
- In office January 2, 1993 – January 2, 2009

Minority Leader of the Senate of Puerto Rico
- In office 2001–2005
- Preceded by: Antonio Fas Alzamora
- Succeeded by: José Luis Dalmau

Personal details
- Born: Kenneth Davison McClintock Hernández; January 19, 1957 (age 69) London, United Kingdom
- Party: New Progressive Party (NPP); Democratic Party
- Spouse: Maria Elena Batista (1994–2012; divorced)
- Education: UPRRP College of Business Administration (BBA); Tulane University Law School (JD)

Kenneth Davison McClintock-Hernández (born January 19, 1957) is a politician who served as the twenty-second Secretary of State of Puerto Rico, one of the four longest serving in that post. McClintock served as co-chair of Hillary Clinton’s National Hispanic Leadership Council in 2008, he co-chaired her successful Puerto Rico primary campaign that year and served as the Thirteenth President of the Senate of Puerto Rico until December 31, 2008. He chaired Luis Fortuño’s Incoming Committee on Government Transition in 2008 and the Outgoing Committee on Government Transition in 2012, the first Puerto Rican to serve in both capacities. He was sworn into office as secretary of state on January 2, 2009, by Chief Justice Federico Hernández Denton, fulfilling the role of lieutenant governor (first-in-line of succession) in the islands. He was appointed by Governor Pedro Pierluisi as a member of the Civil Rights Commission (Puerto Rico) on February 8, 2024, a nomination pending Senate confirmation.

== Early life ==
McClintock was born in London, on January 19, 1957. His father, George Davison McClintock (1925–2001), a Scottish-American architect born in Texas City, Texas and educated at the University of Texas at Austin, was working for the United States Air Force at the time. McClintock's mother, Nívea Mercedes Hernández (1931–2000), born in Puerto Rico, was a university professor, also educated at the University of Texas at Austin, and a member of the Board of Trustees of the University of Puerto Rico. Kenneth, along with his brother Steven George and sister Elaine Mercedes, were raised and educated in Puerto Rico.

He graduated from University High School (UHS) in Río Piedras, Puerto Rico, in 1974, where he served as student council president, studied from 1974 to 1977 at the UPRRP College of Business Administration, and in 1980 obtained his Juris Doctor from Tulane University Law School. While in college, McClintock, along with Puerto Rico's former governor Luis Fortuño, founded the Puerto Rico Statehood Students Association, a student organization that promoted absentee voting in favor of the reelection of Governor Carlos Romero Barceló in 1980. McClintock never applied for admission to the bar, neither in Louisiana nor in Puerto Rico, as his intention was not to practice law but to be a public servant. He began that public service before law school, as the 19-year old staff director for the Puerto Rico House of Representatives Consumer Affairs Committee. He subsequently served as a legislative assistant to the New Party for Progress House delegation.

McClintock has spent most of his adult life working in the Puerto Rico Legislative Assembly, first as a full-time staffer and subsequently as a legislator, before serving as secretary of state and lieutenant governor. While in college, he was an Amway independent distributor, learning how to run a small private business and earning enough money to support himself. After retiring from government service, he joined Politank*, a government affairs firm as Senior Public Policy Advisor, except for a brief period from 2017 to 2018 when Senate President Thomas Rivera Schatz recruited him as his senior advisor.

He was married in 1994, to Maria Elena Batista, who served from 2001 to 2013 as director of Sports and Recreation for the municipality of San Juan and a former 1988 Olympic swimmer. After separating on February 18, 2011, they divorced in 2012 after 18 years of marriage. The two have a son, Kevin Davison McClintock-Batista, born in 1995, a Georgetown University graduate, an aspiring actor, a past National President of the Puerto Rico Statehood Students Association, a post his father held in 1979–80, and a former president of the Young Democrats of America (YDA) Hispanic Caucus, and a daughter, Dr. Stephanie Marie McClintock-Batista, born in 1997, and a University of Notre Dame BA and Ponce Health Services University MD graduate currently a radiology resident at the University of Puerto Rico Medical Sciences campus and practicing medicine in Puerto Rico. He lives in San Juan where he is an active member of the Puerto Rican Episcopal Church.

== Political career ==
=== Early years ===
Involved in politics since the age of 13, at the age of 14, McClintock was appointed by President Richard Nixon as delegate to the White House Conference on Youth held from April 18–21, 1971. In 1978, President Jimmy Carter appointed him to the National Advisory Committee for Juvenile Justice and Delinquency Prevention. In 1979 McClintock served as the first president of the Puerto Rico Statehood Students Association, which he cofounded with Luis Fortuño, then a Georgetown University undergrad.

=== 1980s ===
In 1984, the Jaycees honored him with the Outstanding Young Man of the Year in Journalism Award for his weekly columns in the now-defunct El Mundo daily newspaper.

He was the executive director of the U.S. Democratic Party, chapter of Puerto Rico, from 1984 to 1988 and attended all eleven Democratic Party conventions from 1976 to 2016 as a delegate, a superdelegate or as a staffer. A Democratic National Committeeman since 2000, he was reelected in 2016 to his fourth term, resigning the post in 2017 after 17 years of service.

In 1988 he ran unsuccessfully as the New Progressive Party (NPP) candidate in House District 5.

=== 1990s ===
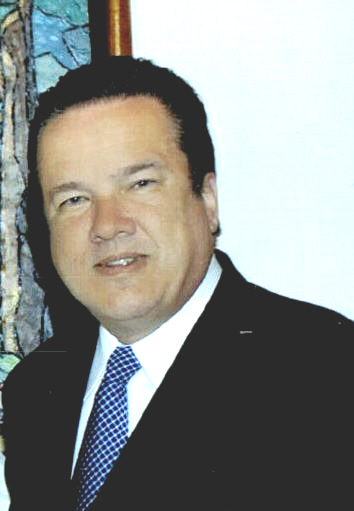
McClintock

He was a Municipal Councilman for San Juan from 1990 to 1992 and during his tenure was the author of the municipal ordinance that raised the salaries of Municipal Guards beyond $1,000 a month for the first time in Puerto Rican history.

In 1992, he was elected the youngest Senator-at-Large for the 12th Legislature. In November 1996 he was the top vote getter among all NPP and PDP senatorial candidates. During his fourth term, he was nominated by his New Progressive Party caucus as Senate President on November 4, 2004, and formally elected and sworn in for a four-year term as the Senate's 13th President on January 10, 2005.

In 1996, President Bill Clinton appointed McClintock as an at-large member of the Democratic Platform Committee, where he was a drafter of the platform plank on Puerto Rico.

In the 1990s he fought for Puerto Rico's inclusion in the proposed World War II Memorial on the National Mall after only two territories (Hawaii and Alaska) had been included in the first memorial design and all other U.S. territories (Philippines, Puerto Rico, Guam, American Samoa and the United States Virgin Islands), several of which were actually invaded by Japan, had been excluded. His efforts included the approval of a Concurrent Resolution by the legislature and lobbying in Washington.

During 1999, he served as the 62nd Chairman of the Council of State Governments, the youngest and first Hispanic in that organization's 75-year history. During his terms in CSG leadership, the organization strengthened its international ties, admitting several Canadian provinces as international member jurisdictions, co-sponsoring the foundation of the Parliamentary Conference of the Americas, and co-chairing with CSG President and Wisconsin's then-Governor Tommy Thompson a mission to the People's Republic of China, in which he met with Premier Zhū Róngjī. As chairman, McClintock increased the presence of Hispanics in CSG committees and task forces and helped organize CSG's best attended Annual Meeting ever, held at the Chateau Frontenac in Quebec City, Canada. He also was part of the official delegation that attended the December 14, 1999, ceremonies commemorating the final turnover on December 31, 1999, of the Panama Canal to the Panamanian authorities.

He authored over 1,200 legislative measures during his 16 years in the Senate, of which over 200 became law.

He served as the second president of the Parliamentary Conference of the Americas from 1999 to 2000, a forum that brings together the parliamentary assemblies of the unitary, federal and federated states, regional parliaments and interparliamentary organizations of the Americas. The Legislative Assembly of Puerto Rico hosted the General Assembly of COPA in July 2000. He serves on the board of trustees of The Washington Center, a Washington, D.C.–based non-profit organization and on the board of Episcopal Health Services, which owns several health-related entities in Puerto Rico, including the St. Luke Episcopal Medical Center in Ponce.

=== 2000s ===
In 2000, he was elected as Puerto Rico's Democratic National Committeeman, a position to which he was reelected in 2004, 2008, 2012 and 2016.

Prior to his election as Senate President, he served as Senate Minority Leader from 2001 to 2004 and he chaired the Senate's Committee on Government and Federal Affairs, as well as the Joint Committee for the Córdova-Fernós Congressional Internships Program from 1993 to 2000.

As Senate committee chairman, he produced reports that served to make radical changes in public policy. The report on the conditions of the companies availed to the tax benefits of the now-defunct Section 936 of the Federal Internal Revenue Code earned him an interview in ABC's Prime Time Live program and Univision Network. He has testified in diverse hearings of the Congressional Committees, and has been the guest speaker in several universities throughout the United States. He has been interviewed in ABC's Good Morning America, has debated on Fox News Network and has appeared on BBC news programs, as well as on C-SPAN's Washington Journal.

His efforts to promote economic equality to Puerto Rico's consumers by stateside corporations were profiled in a Business Week article in 1998. In 1996, along with Fortuño, he was appointed by Governor Pedro Rosselló as co-chair of the NPP's Platform Committee, a position to which he was reappointed by the party's 2000 gubernatorial candidate Carlos I. Pesquera.

In 2004, he chaired the New Progressive Party's Senate Campaign Committee and flipped his party's nine-member minority, of which he served as Minority Leader from 2001 to 2004, into a nearly two-thirds majority in the new Senate in 2005, even though the NPP gubernatorial candidate narrowly lost the election.

In 2008, along with Roberto Prats, he co-chaired Sen. Clinton's successful campaign for Puerto Rico's presidential primary, which she won 68% to 32%, the second highest vote margin (after West Virginia) in that year's election cycle.

In 2012, he was elected by the Puerto Rico Democratic State Convention to a fourth consecutive four-year term as the territory's Democratic National Committeeman, remaining the territory's most senior Democrat. In September 2009, he was elected to a four-year term as chairman of the DNC's Northeast Hispanic Caucus. In September 2012, he attended his tenth consecutive Democratic National Convention in Charlotte, North Carolina. He attended his eleventh consecutive convention in Philadelphia in July 2016 and has already been certified a super delegate to the 2020 Democratic National Convention.

==== Election as President of the Senate ====
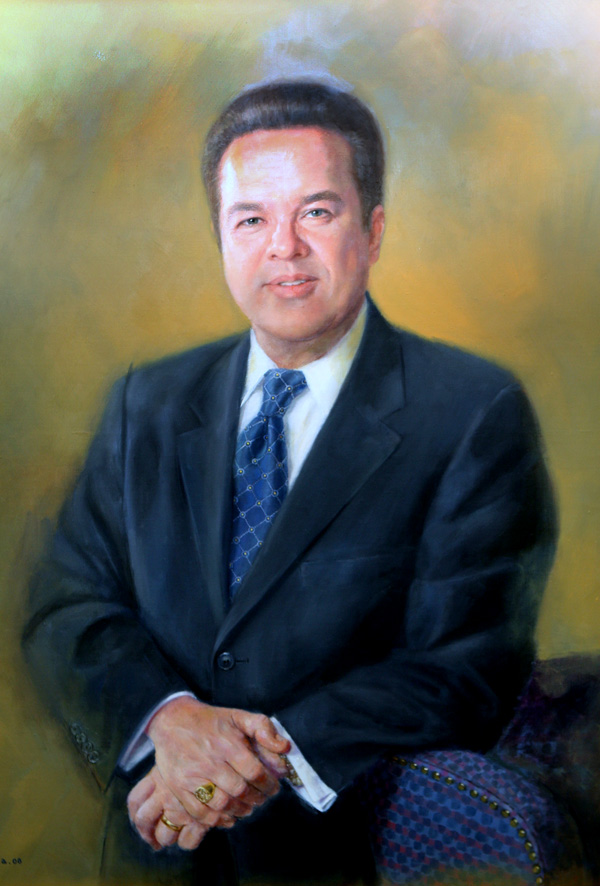
Portrait of McClintock as President of the Senate of Puerto Rico

From January 10, 2005 to December 31, 2008, McClintock presided over the Senate of Puerto Rico. His presidency was in jeopardy during most of that year, as former Governor Pedro Rosselló was sworn in as a member of the Senate on February 13, 2005, and sought the Presidency for the remainder of the term. McClintock was elected to the Puerto Rico Senate Presidency with 23 votes, including 14 of the 17 NPP senators (McClintock abstained, one seat was vacant and Sen. Norma Burgos abstained in protest for the manner in which the NPP caucus allegedly elected the Senate leadership), and the entire nine-member minority delegation of the Popular Democratic Party, while the Puerto Rico Independence Party senator followed party tradition in abstaining from leadership votes).

Since 2001, Senate rules require a unanimous vote to change the presidency. During his presidency, he backed many nominations and some public policy positions of Governor Aníbal Acevedo Vilá. Some nominations failed to obtain the Senate's consent, two through rejection, others through inaction or withdrawal by the governor following the Senate president's "advice" to do so. He participated in the multilateral negotiations between the governor, the Speaker, McClintock, the Roman Catholic Archbishop of San Juan, the Episcopal bishop for the Diocese of Puerto Rico and several Protestant leaders, in breaking the logjam that led to the end of a two-week-long government shutdown in May 2006.

For close to three years, of the seventeen senators that were elected under the NPP in the 2004 General Elections, six remained loyal to McClintock's presidency, thus denying his opponents the unanimity required by Senate Rules II and VI to declare the presidency vacant. As McClintock stripped eight of the ten senators who supported Rosselló's claim for the Presidency of the chairmanships of Senate committees, leaving a total of ten committees under the leadership of the five NPP senators who still backed him and two, the Ethics and the Public Safety committees remained under the leadership of senators supporting Rosselló. Many Capitol insiders had claimed that this had the effect of overflowing committees with work and slowing down the process of bills becoming laws. However, when that issue was raised on the floor of the Senate, McClintock ordered an investigation on legislative productivity that he stated statistically demonstrated that committee output was higher during the third legislative session (after committee and chairmanship consolidations) than during the first.

One senator who supported him and came to the NPP expelled in the past term from the PDP, former Senate Majority Leader Jorge De Castro Font was expelled from the New Progressive Party for being McClintock's ally to remain Senate President. This sanction was endorsed in a Party state assembly in 2005, for allegedly insulting high officials of the NPP (including its president, Pedro Rosselló), rejecting to comply with majority decisions of the party's state assembly (including support for Rossello's Senate presidency bid), and allegedly making political alliances with the PDP delegation in the Senate. Senator McClintock and four of the other senators who supported him were relieved of party positions for the same reasons.

The party's directorate recommended expelling Sen. McClintock as well as Senate Vice President Orlando Parga on February 13, 2006. On August 20, 2006, however, the party's General Assembly failed to ratify their expulsion, approving instead a generic censure, reportedly reflecting the discomfort that the proposed expulsion created among many party members. As a result of his refusal to yield his leadership position in the Senate, he was seen without any political future by those who supported Sen. Rossello's bid, including a number of NPP voters who also supported Rossello.

On January 16, 2007, the NPP Senate Caucus imposed disciplinary sanctions on two more NPP senators, José Emilio González, Rosselló's fellow senator from the Arecibo district, and Carmelo Ríos Santiago of the Bayamón district. The two were the decisive votes to pass a Concurrent Resolution proposing a constitutional amendment that would turn Puerto Rico's bicameral legislature in a unicameral system, an issue not addressed by the party's platform. In total, during the term, the caucus disciplined eight of the 16 members elected to the Senate in 2004.

Members of the NPP hardcore rank and file had clearly stated they would never forgive the negotiations they allege took place against the statehood movement by McClintock, and did not acknowledge the Senate President's extensive efforts to lobby in Congress and generate national media coverage for the enactment of legislation to provide self-determination for Puerto Rico, as proposed by President George W. Bush's White House Task Force on Puerto Rico's Political Status. Likewise, many political observers, including a number of NPP voters who opposed Rosselló, believed that McClintock's and Parga's removal from party membership rolls would be insignificant within the NPP; since both depended upon the rank and file structure to get elected with the party, while other observers and party leaders had expressed concern that the removals imperil future party victories, by the alienation of tens of thousands of past party supporters. Many party members, however, considered McClintock and his supporters as "traitors". On February 23, 2007, McClintock announced that if the party disciplinary sanctions were not lifted "within a reasonable time" he would file suit to protect "not only the constitutional rights of the senators who have been sanctioned but the rights of party members to freely select the candidates of their choice in the March 2008 primary". That "reasonable time" ended on March 29, 2007, when he, along with four other senators, filed suit in San Juan Superior Court, claiming that NPP leaders violated the due process required by the state elections laws when parties attempt to discipline its members. Judge Oscar Davila Suliveres ruled on April 12 against NPP Secretary Thomas Rivera Schatz and determined the lawsuit was meritorious and would be decided on the merits within several days. All sanctions against the McClintock Six were nullified by San Juan Superior Court Judge Oscar Dávila Suliveres on May 8, 2007, who determined that they had broken no programmatic or rule-based accord, and that they were free to run in the NPP's 2008 primary. On May 11, the Court reiterated, in a Nunc Pro Tunc Order, that any attempt by party officials to deny the rights of the McClintock Six would nullify the party primary. The Puerto Rico Supreme Court affirmed the lower court's ruling on June 12, 2007, declaring all sanctions against the senators null and void.

On December 27, 2007, the Supreme Court of Puerto Rico denied the NPP's attempt to deny McClintock's senatorial allies the opportunity to appear on the 2008 NPP primary ballot. In a 4–1 decision, the Court reaffirmed McClintock's right to remain as Senate President unless he voluntarily resigns, dies, or was removed as a member of the Senate.

A 2007 El Nuevo Día opinion poll reflected that, in spite of being censured by the New Progressive Party, he had become its third most popular leader, after Resident Commissioner Luis Fortuño and party president Pedro Rosselló, surpassing San Juan Mayor Jorge Santini, former gubernatorial candidate Carlos Pesquera and Bayamón Mayor Ramón Luis Rivera.

There were several attempts to unify the New Progressive Party delegation in the Senate, but all of them were sabotaged by some Party leaders, such as then-Secretary General, Thomas Rivera Schatz and Party Vice-President Miriam Ramírez de Ferrer.

Upon Luis Fortuño's decisive victory in the March 9, 2008, NPP primaries, McClintock and his (mostly renominated) stalwarts were welcomed back into the party, reinstated to their leadership positions and McClintock appointed five of the eleven former Senate defectors to committee chairmanships.

On December 31, 2008, after a full term as Senate President, McClintock ended his 16-year career as a legislator, as he prepared to assume the duties of Secretary of State of Puerto Rico, for which he was unanimously confirmed by the Senate, including many senators who had withdrawn their political support for him in the past.

==== Work as President of the Senate ====
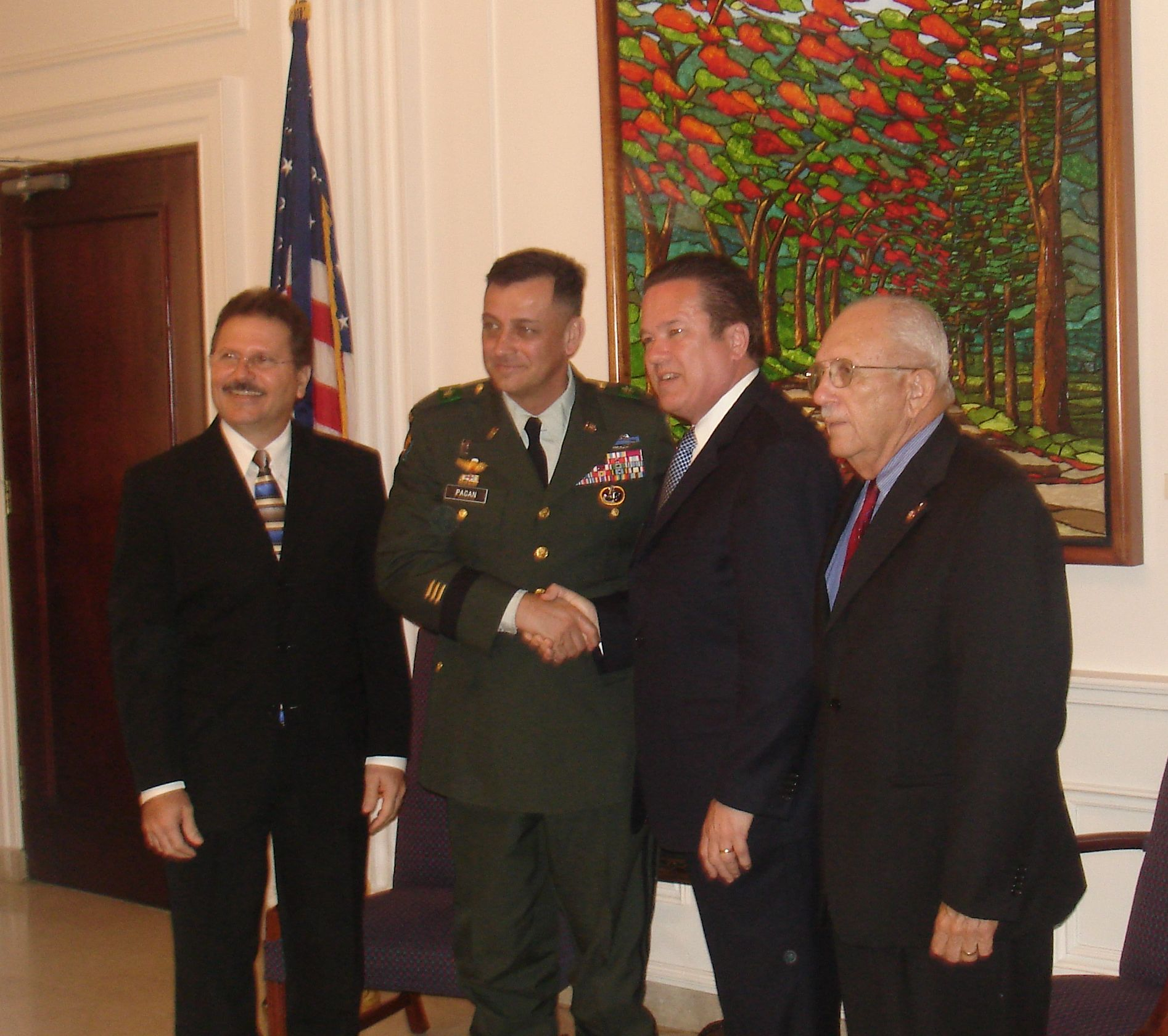
Kenneth McClintock greets BG. Hector E. Pagan in the presence of (L – R) House Speaker Jose F. Aponte and MG Felix Santoni (Ret.) in the State Capitol on Memorial Day 2008

Ambassadors David Manning, then-British ambassador to the United States, visited his office, and met with People's Republic of China Premier Zhu Rongji in 1999, Costa Rica Presidents José María Figueres and Oscar Arias Sánchez, Canadian Prime Minister Jean Chrétien, Panama's President Martin Torrijos, well as U.S. Presidents Jimmy Carter, George H. W. Bush, Bill Clinton and George W. Bush. He also championed improving school-level physical and health education, the theme of his World Health Day 2006 address before the Panamerican Health Organization in Washington, D.C..

McClintock was a frequent speaker at stateside universities, where he addressed Puerto Rico's political status issue.

In September, 2007 he began a media campaign to oust Panama National Assembly president Pedro Miguel González Pinzón, who stands accused in U.S. District Court for the District of Columbia of murdering Puerto Rican-born U.S. Army Sgt. Zak Hernández, bolstered by the approval by 25 of the 27 members of the Senate of Puerto Rico of a resolution he authored expressing the legislative body's "profound preoccupation with the Panamanian leader's election. González Pinzón was subsequently denied reelection.

In 2007, McClintock convened a meeting in Honolulu, Hawaii, of Senate presidents from Alaska, Hawaii, Guam, the Northern Marianas Islands and Puerto Rico to establish the Outlying Areas Senate Presidents Caucus to discuss issues common to the nation's outlying areas and devise common strategies to deal with such issues. One outcome of his efforts was Federal Communications Commission chairman Kevin Martin's support of the XM/Sirius satellite radio merger after Sirius committed to extending service to Puerto Rico.

The Honorable President of the Puerto Rican Senate Kenneth McClintock (right) with Tony (The Marine) Santiago

On April 7, 2008, McClintock and House Speaker Aponte joined former President Bill Clinton for the unveiling of a statue depicting former President Franklin D. Roosevelt (one of only two in a wheelchair), now a part of the "Paseo de los Presidentes", or President's Walk, exhibiting on the south side of the Capitol statues of the nine presidents who have visited the U.S. territory while in office..

On May 26, McClintock presided over the yearly Memorial Day ceremony and concert that has become one of the trademarks of his presidency. A special recognition by McClintock and Resident Commissioner Fortuño of Antonio Santiago (Tony (The Marine) Santiago) was followed by a keynote address by then-Sen. Clinton in the presence of her husband and daughter. At the end of the ceremony, the names of several men and women were unveiled on Puerto Rico's Memorial Wall, which honors Puerto Ricans who died in military service. Several of the names on the wall have been placed as a result of Santiago's military history research.

McClintock's presidency began to draw to a close when on June 30, 2008, he gaveled the Senate out of the seventh and last regular session of the term. He remained as president until December 31, 2008, a day after he called the Senate into a final special session, when he turned over the gavel to Senate Secretary Manuel A. Torres, who served as Acting President until the fourteenth Senate President, Thomas Rivera Schatz was officially elected on January 12, 2009.

On September 11, 2008, McClintock presided over the first joint meeting of the Puerto Rico Legislative Assembly outside the Capitol ever, held at the Roberto Clemente Coliseum in San Juan, Puerto Rico, to commemorate the 7th anniversary of the terrorist attacks against the United States and present the Military Medal of the Puerto Rico Legislative Assembly to those residents of Puerto Rico who had served in Iraq and Afghanistan. Over 1,000 of the 9,000 eligible were present for the ceremony, accompanied by over 1,500 family members. Puerto Rico Independence Party legislators boycotted the event.

==== 2008 transition ====
On November 7, 2008, the NPP's senators-elect chose Rivera Schatz to succeed McClintock as of January 12, 2009, as the Fourteenth President of the Senate in its 91-year history. McClintock was appointed by Governor-Elect Luis Fortuño, to serve as chairman of the Incoming Committee on Government Transition. During the first twelve days of the new year, outgoing Senate Secretary Manuel A. Torres served as Acting President of the legislative body.

==== Secretary of State of Puerto Rico ====
Kenneth D. McClintock and his staffers at the Puerto Rico State Department Building in San Juan.

On November 11, 2008, Governor-Elect Luis Fortuño appointed McClintock as Secretary of State of Puerto Rico. Due to the fact that the appointment entailed serving the role of lieutenant governor, McClintock required confirmation by both the Senate of Puerto Rico as well as the House of Representatives. McClintock was active in the National Lieutenant Governors Association (NLGA) and the National Association of Secretaries of State.

McClintock was sworn in, under a recess appointment, as the 22nd Secretary of State of Puerto Rico on the morning of January 2, 2009 by Puerto Rico Supreme Court Chief Justice Federico Hernández Denton in the court's chambers minutes after he privately swore in Gov. Fortuño, who later took the oath of office in a public ceremony that afternoon. On January 15, 2009, he was confirmed unanimously by the Senate of Puerto Rico and with only two votes in opposition in the 53-seat Puerto Rico House of Representatives. Having been confirmed, he was sworn in on January 17, 2009, by Bayamón Superior Court Judge Angel Manuel Candelas in a private ceremony in the neighborhood where McClintock was raised and lived for many years.

In September 2009, he led Puerto Rico's four-member component of the United States' delegation, headed by United States Secretary of Commerce Gary Locke to the III Americas Competitiveness Forum in Santiago, Chile, participated in 2010 in the fourth Forum, held in Atlanta and in the fifth Forum in Santo Domingo in 2011.

McClintock was designated by Fortuño to lead the Puerto Rico governments efforts to facilitate the islands' transition to digital television. He has also been designated as chairman of the government's efforts to assist in the 2010 census, as well as the five-member Executive Branch Reorganization and Modernization Committee that produced 13 reorganization plans, eleven of which became law. He also chaired a five-member Legislative Reform Committee that made recommendations in October 2009 regarding a revamping of Puerto Rico's legislature. In 2010, Gov. Fortuño delegated him all gubernatorial powers regarding the approval of public-private partnership (P3) contracts under Puerto Rico's Public Private Partnership Law.

External audio
- You may listen to McClintock in an interview made by the "Boston Globe" in regard to Puerto Rico's political Status on YouTube

Domestically, McClintock frequently participates as a speaker at activities throughout the states, Puerto Rico and foreign countries. In 2009, he spoke before the National Puerto Rican Coalition in Washington, D.C., served as the commencement speaker at the Universidad del Este (UNE) in Puerto Rico and joined Massachusetts Lieutenant Governor Timothy Murray at a recognition ceremony of the 65th Infantry Regiment in Worcester, Massachusetts, on June 20. In 2011, he was the keynote speaker at Hispanic Heritage activities in Cleveland, Ohio

While Secretary of State, McClintock met Republic of China President Ma Ying-jeou.

On January 12, 2010, as acting governor, McClintock was placed in charge of Puerto Rico's Haitian relief efforts by Governor Fortuño, which included a $4.5 million Telethon benefitting the Red Cross and collecting millions of pounds of aid, reportedly the largest shipment of non-governmental aid sent during the first two weeks of the relief effort. On January 20, McClintock made a 4-hour visit to Port-au-Prince, Haiti, where, along with Puerto Rico journalist Carmen Jovet, he met with President Préval and Prime Minister Bellerive to coordinate Puerto Rico's relief efforts. He subsequently met with Preval in San Juan and was appointed by Secretary Hillary Clinton as part of the United States delegation to a meeting in Martinique in March 2010 to plan the multi-nation redevelopment of Haiti. He also helped coordinate Puerto Rico's initial response to the massive February 27, 2010, earthquake in Chile.

In September 2010, he headed the Puerto Rico delegation to the International Book Fair (LIBER 2010), dedicated to Puerto Rico and held in Barcelona, Spain.

In addition to his other duties, he participated in organizing President Obama's June 14, 2011, historic visit to Puerto Rico.

In July, 2011, he was selected as co-chair of the National Association of Secretaries of State's International Relations Committee at its 2011 summer meeting in Daniels, West Virginia. McClintock subsequently hosted NASS' 2012 summer meeting in San Juan.

In the summer of 2011, along with United States Deputy Assistant Secretary of State Brenda Sprague, he announced that Secretary of State Clinton has authorized the opening in 2012 of a U.S. Department of State Passport Office in San Juan, to serve Puerto Rico and the United States Virgin Islands, the first such office in the Caribbean ever. Due to the temporary closure of the Roberto Sánchez Vilella Government Center's North Tower by the EPA in 2012, the ribbon-cutting ceremony was pushed back beyond McClintock's incumbency as secretary of state. Until 1985, the federal agency authorized the Puerto Rico State Department to issue United States passports, but since then had only allowed it to operate a passport acceptance agency.

===== Foreign travel as Secretary of State =====
Secretary McClintock visited eleven countries, including being a member of United States delegations, traveling to coordinate disaster relief, represent Gov. Fortuño or promote foreign trade and the Caribbean Energy Grid proposal. Reflecting McClintock's international activities, the countries in three continents visited include:

- Bahamas
- Barbados
- Canada
- Chile
- People's Republic of China
- Dominican Republic
- Grand Cayman
- Haiti
- Martinique
- Spain
- Taiwan

===== Meetings with major religious leaders =====
During his term as secretary of state and previously during his service in the Senate, McClintock met with numerous religious leaders, including the Papal Nuncio in the Dominican Republic, who has ecclesiastical authority over the Roman Catholic Church in Puerto Rico, the Presiding Bishop of the Episcopal Church Katharine Jefferts Schori and the chief abbot of the Buddhist Shaolin Temple in Henan, Shi Yongxin.

===== Other international activities =====
Prior to serving as secretary of state, his official foreign travels in four continents, which set the stage for his level of international activity, included:

- Austria
- Belgium
- Brazil
- Canada
- Costa Rica
- Guatemala
- Mexico
- Panama
- People's Republic of China
- Spain
- Turkey
- United Kingdom

On July 1, 2000, McClintock led COPA's Mission of Electoral Observers during Mexico's presidential elections which the nation's ruling party for decades lost to Vicente Fox, who became President of Mexico later that year. Three six-year presidential terms later, another Puerto Rican, Eduardo Bhatia led another COPA delegation for the same purpose.

===== Current and former heads of state hosted as Secretary of State =====
During Secretary McClintock's service as secretary of state, the following eleven current and former heads of state or governments have visited Puerto Rico:

- Álvaro Uribe, former President of Colombia
- Leonel Fernández, President of the Dominican Republic
- Constantine II, former King of Greece
- René Préval, President of Haiti
- Felipe Calderón, President of Mexico
- Vicente Fox, former president of Mexico
- Martín Torrijos, former president of Panama
- José María Aznar, former prime minister of Spain
- Barack Obama, former president of the United States
- Bill Clinton, former president of the United States
- Ricardo Martinelli, President of Panama

He has also hosted ministerial- and ambassadorial-level diplomats, such as Secretary of State Hillary Clinton, the ambassadors of Spain, Israel and the Czech Republic, ss well as members of royal families such as Haya bint Hussein, Princess of Jordan and president of the International Federation for Equestrian Sports, among other notable figures, such as then-businessman Donald Trump, later elected President of the United States and former Vice President of the United States Al Gore.

==== Caribbean Energy Grid ====
During his term as secretary of state, McClintock promoted the Fortuño administration's proposal to develop a Caribbean Energy Grid in which all Caribbean and Central American islands and nations would interconnect via an underwater electric transmission cable in order to generate electric cost reductions to consumers throughout the region, contribute to renewable energy development and reduced dependence on oil, the fuel most used to generate electricity in Caribbean islands today. On December 1, 2009, McClintock first spoke of the Fortuño administration proposal, during the 33rd Miami Conference on the Caribbean & Central America, that a Caribbean Basin electric grid be developed to reduce the region's "addiction to oil", as he called it.

By April 2010, Energy Secretary Steven Chu and Secretary of State Clinton were speaking positively and publicly about the Caribbean Energy Grid proposal at an energy ministerial meeting of the Americas held in Washington, D.C..

McClintock has spoken extensively about this Fortuño administration proposal at numerous conferences, including some specifically organized to discuss the proposed grid, since he first proposed it in December 2009.

The first concrete steps in developing the proposal announced by McClintock in December 2009 are already being taken. In 2010, the United States Congress approved a $475,000 earmark supported by Reps. Donna Christensen (D-VI) and Pedro Pierluisi (D-PR) to fund a study on the viability of interconnecting Puerto Rico and the United States Virgin Islands power systems. Siemens AG completed the study in July 2011. The government of Spain financed a World Bank pre-feasibility study on the possible interconnection of Puerto Rico and the Dominican Republic's power systems, which would be an integral part of the proposed Caribbean Energy Grid.

==== Final days as Secretary of State ====
After the election of Sen. Alejandro García Padilla as the 10th elected Governor of Puerto Rico on November 6, 2012, McClintock became the statutory chairman of Governor Fortuño's Outgoing Committee on Government Transition, the first and so far only to have chaired both the Incoming and Outgoing Committee on Transition since the approval of the Government Transition Law of 2004. On January 2, 2013, following long-standing tradition, he opened the Governor-elect's Inaugural Ceremony, minutes before completing this last stage of his public service career. Having served a full four-year term, McClintock tied with Secretary Fernando Chardón as the third longest-serving Secretary of State. Only Secretaries Sánchez-Vilella and Burgos served longer terms.

==== Post-governmental life ====
After a public career that spanned 39 years, McClintock accepted a full pension from the Government Retirement System in June 2013. He was recruited by the Interamerican University of Puerto Rico to teach American Government and Government Management courses and a Legislative Procedure seminar at its Metro campus in San Juan. He worked for Politank*, a Puerto Rico-based bipartisan government affairs firm from 2013 to 2017 as its Senior Public Policy Advisor and was frequently asked to speak at legislative hearings, public ceremonies or in the media. From January 2017 to April 2018, he served as the senior advisor to Senate President Thomas Rivera Schatz before returning to the private sector.

==== Directorships ====
For over two decades, McClintock has been a member of the board of directors of The Washington Center for Internships and Academic Seminars (TWC), a Washington, DC-based non-profit.

In August 2017, Rafael Morales-Maldonado, Diocesan Bishop of the Episcopal Diocese of Puerto Rico appointed him as a member of the board of directors of Episcopal Health Services of Puerto Rico, which operates St. Luke's Episcopal Hospital in Ponce, a hospice and a home care health service. He also serves as a member of the board of St. Luke's and of the Episcopal Seminary of St. Peter and St. Paul.

McClintock, a lifelong Episcopalian baptized in London's St. George's Anglican Church in Notting Hill, also serves as Bishop Morales' parliamentary advisor, and previously served as a member of the diocese's Stewardship Committee during the incumbency of Wilfrido Ramos-Orench as provisional bishop of the Puerto Rico diocese.

==== Legacies ====
Among the long-lasting legacies of McClintock's public life are the Córdova-Fernós Congressional Internship Program, which has been replicated in 19 states and territories, the most recent being the United States Virgin Islands, where Gov. John deJongh signed a bill establishing a similar program after McClintock testified in favor of passage in the V.I. Legislature.

Some of the more significant laws authored by McClintock during his 16-year senatorial career include:

• The Córdova-Fernós Congressional Internship Act of 1993

• Puerto Rico's 911 Act of 1993

• The Puerto Rico Conservatory of Music Act

• The 1996 Puerto Rico Casino Act

• Net-Metering Act

• Puerto Rico's Light-Pollution Control Act

On June 12, 2015, acting Governor David Bernier hosted the unveiling of McClintock's official portrait at the State Department in the presence of former Governor Fortuño.

==== Publications ====
During the 1980s, McClintock was a regular columnist for the now-defunct El Mundo newspaper, and has published over 100 essays and speeches in his Facebook page. He is known to continue historical research activities which he has publicly said may result in future books and publications.

He has co-authored one book with Puerto Rico Democratic Party State Chair Roberto Prats:

• Te Quiero Puerto Rico – Primaria Presidencial Demócrata 2008, Co-author with Roberto Prats, published by Aguilar, a subsidiary of Editorial Santillana, First edition in Spanish (200pp), 2010, ISBN 978-1-60484-744-4

In 2016 he was a coauthor of:

• Puerto Rico y su Gobierno, edited by Héctor Luis Acevedo and published by the Inter-American University. McClintock authored two of its 22 chapters.

==== Honors and recognitions ====
In his autobiography, the late Senator Paul Simon described "State Senator Ken McClintock, (as) a capable and aggressive young leader" who favors "statehood and I hope it happens".

For over a quarter century McClintock has been a member of the board of directors of TWC, a non-profit based in Washington, D.C.

In 2010 he was the keynote speaker at the Universidad del Este commencement in Puerto Rico.

On October 31, 2011, in a ceremony at La Fortaleza also honoring Gov. Fortuño and Puerto Rico Senate Majority Whip Lucy Arce, the United States Selective Service director Lawrence Romo awarded McClintock its Meritorious Service Award and medal for his efforts as Senate President and Secretary of State to increase Selective Service registration rates in Puerto Rico as well as shepherding a bill into local law (signed December 12, 2011) to allow Selective Service registration while applying for a driver's license.

On June 14, 2012, McClintock was awarded the Ana G. Méndez University System Presidential Medal by then system president José F. Méndez during the Metropolitan University commencement ceremonies held at the Pedro Rosselló Convention Center.

On September 6, 2012, late in the September 5 session of the 2012 Democratic National Convention, McClintock participated in the Roll Call of the States to record Puerto Rico's vote in the nomination of President Barack Obama for a second term in office.

An oil portrait by Cuban-Venezuelan Estrella Díaz depicting him, unveiled by Senate President Thomas Rivera Schatz hangs at the Capitol Building's Hall of Presidents, while a photographic portrait hangs in the wall of Secretaries of State in Puerto Rico's State Department.

== Notes ==
Non-profit organization positions
Preceded by Founding president	President of the Puerto Rico Statehood Students Association; 1979–1980	Succeeded by Luis Fortuño
Political offices
Preceded by Antonio Fas Alzamora	President of the Puerto Rico Senate; 2005–2008	Succeeded by Thomas Rivera Schatz
Preceded by Fernando Bonilla	Secretary of State of Puerto Rico; 2009–2013	Succeeded by David Bernier
Senate of Puerto Rico
Preceded by Antonio Fas Alzamora	Minority Leader of the Puerto Rico Senate; 2001–2005	Succeeded by José Luis Dalmau
