= Francisco Cimadevilla =

Puerto Rican journalist

Francisco Cimadevilla is a former Vice President and Editor-in-Chief for the Casiano Communications (CCI) media emporium in Puerto Rico, previously serving at Casiano as Editor of Caribbean Business, the U.S. territory's only weekly business newspaper, from 1999 to 2004. He is currently a private consultant.

Cimadevilla is a magna cum laude 1983 graduate of Georgetown University's School of Foreign Service, and a Harvard Law School 1986 Juris Doctor graduate. While in college, he served as editor of the Harvard Journal of Law and Public Policy, and he clerked at the McConnell, Valdés law firm in San Juan, Puerto Rico and at the Windels Marx Lane & Mittendorf law firm in New York City. A supporter of statehood for Puerto Rico, Cimadevilla was active in the Puerto Rico Statehood Students Association.

After law school, Cimadevilla practiced law in the United States and abroad, specializing in international trade and regulation at the Baker & McKenzie law firm in Washington DC for four years, as well as serving as International Legal Counsel at the Fabregat & Bermejo law firm in Madrid, Spain, dealing with corporate and international trade law.

For over six years, he served the government of Puerto Rico, first as the U.S. territory's Assistant Secretary of State for Caribbean Basin Affairs under Secretary of State Baltasar Corrada del Rio from 1993 to 1995, and as Chief Economic Development Officer at the Puerto Rico Department of Economic Development and Commerce from 1995 to 1996. In 1997 he was appointed Deputy Secretary of the Department. Concurrently, from 1995 until he left government service in 1999, he was a member of the Puerto Rico Business Review editorial board, after which he joined Casiano Communications.

Cimadevilla has branched out into political and news analysis and is featured in TV and radio talk shows, including the highly rated "En la Mirilla" daily PM drive-time news analysis program produced by political analyst Luis Dávila Colón for the Notiuno radio network. He has been invited to speak before different groups, the most recent of which was the San Juan Rotary Club in December, 2007.
