= Franck Guillemard =

French ice hockey centre

- Born: April 28, 1975 (age 50) Nancy, France
- Height: 6 ft 1 in (185 cm)
- Weight: 190 lb (86 kg; 13 st 8 lb)
- Position: Centre
- Shot: Right
- Played for: Lions de Lyon; Brûleurs de Loups
- National team: France
- Playing career: 1992–2003

Franck Guillemard (born April 28, 1975) is a French former professional ice hockey centre.

Guillemard played for Lions de Lyon between 1992 and 2000 and Brûleurs de Loups between 2000 and 2003. He also played for France during the 1999 IIHF World Championship.
