= Telegate =

- Type: Aktiengesellschaft (Xetra: TGT)
- Industry: Telecommunications
- Founded: 1996 in Munich, Germany
- Headquarters: Martinsried, Germany
- Key people: Andreas Albath, CEO
- Products: Directory assistance
- Website: www.telegate.com

Telegate is a communications company based in Martinsried, Germany, providing directory assistance services to callers in Germany, Spain, and Italy. Telegate was founded in August 1996 and began offering services in its home country Germany in December of the same year, initially through the number 01199, and later through the number 11880. The company is publicly held, listed on the Neuer Markt of the Frankfurt Stock Exchange beginning on April 22, 1999.

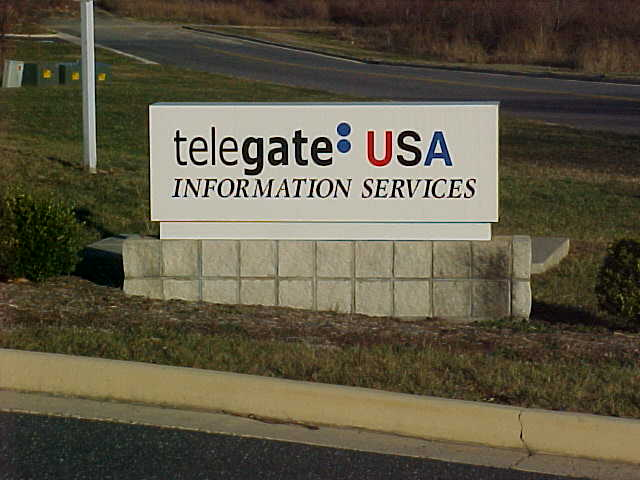
Telegate USA sign at the former Waynesboro, Virginia call center

Besides providing services in Germany, Italy and Spain, Telegate was formerly a provider of directory assistance services in the United Kingdom and the United States. Telegate's UK operation was sold to Croftacre Holdings Ltd in September 2004, originally named 118866 Ltd. and later operating as RingTrue Solutions before winding-up in 2008. Telegate entered the US market in 2000 through its purchase of CFW Information Services, formerly a subsidiary of CFW Communications. Telegate closed the former CFW call centers in 2001 and 2002, before withdrawing from the US market entirely.

Since August 2016, the company is called 11880 Solutions. Meanwhile, it no longer operates in international markets, but only in Germany.

== See also ==
- Call centre
