= Secretary of Housing of Puerto Rico =

Government of Puerto Rico

- Incumbent; Luis Augusto Martínez Román since 2026
- Department of Housing
- Nominator: Governor
- Appointer: Governor with advice and consent from the Senate
- Term length: 4 years
- Formation: Established by Law No. 97 of 1972
- Website: www.vivienda.pr.gov

The secretary of housing of Puerto Rico (Spanish: Secretario de la Vivienda de Puerto Rico) is responsible for homeownership, affordable housing, and community assistance programs in Puerto Rico.

== List of secretaries of housing ==
- 1977–1984: Jorge Pierluisi Diaz
- 2009–2012: Miguel Hernández Vivoni
- 2013–2014: Rubén Ríos Pagán
- 2014–2016: Alberto Lastra Power
- 2017–2020: Fernando Gil-Enseñat
- 2020: Luis C. Fernández Trinchet
- 2021–2024: William Rodríguez Rodríguez
- 2024–2026: Ciary Pérez Peña
- 2026–Present: Luis Augusto Martínez Román
