= José Jaime Pierluisi =

Puerto Rican economist

- Born: June 12, 1965; San Juan, Puerto Rico
- Died: June 7, 1994 (aged 28); San Juan, Puerto Rico
- Education: Harvard University (AB, MBA)
- Relatives: Pedro Pierluisi (brother)

José Jaime Pierluisi (June 12, 1965 – June 7, 1994) was an economic adviser to Puerto Rico Governor Pedro Rosselló from 1993 until his death during a carjacking on June 7, 1994. His brother, Pedro Pierluisi, is a former governor of Puerto Rico.

== Education and extracurricular involvement ==
A cum laude graduate of Harvard College and the recipient of an M.B.A. from Harvard Business School, Pierluisi had been a leader of the Puerto Rico Statehood Students Association in the early 1980s.

== Personal life ==
His brother was former Puerto Rico Attorney General, Resident Commissioner in the United States House of Representatives and Governor of Puerto Rico, Pedro Pierluisi. His father was the longest-serving Secretary of Puerto Rico's Housing Department, Jorge Pierluisi, who served under Gov. Carlos Romero Barceló from 1977 to 1985.

After obtaining his undergraduate degree, he worked at the First Boston Corporation before pursuing his graduate degree. Prior to joining Gov. Rosselló's staff as an economic adviser, he served as Treasurer of The Bank and Trust of Puerto Rico.

== Death ==
Pierluisi was killed during a carjacking on June 7, 1994, in front of his parents' home. The killers took his wallet, briefcase and car. After his death, which took place days before his planned wedding and blocks away from the San Jorge Catholic Church where the ceremony was scheduled to take place, Rosselló declared three days of official mourning and served as a pallbearer at his funeral, held at San Jorge.

The José Jaime Pierluisi Foundation, founded by family and friends and named after him, memorializes him by providing scholarships to talented Puerto Rican college students.

== See also ==
- Crime in Puerto Rico
