= Puerto Rico Statehood Students Association =

Student organization that advocates statehood for Puerto Rico

- President: Christian Santos
- Treasurer: Ramon Ramirez
- Founded: 1979, 2007
- Headquarters: San Juan, Puerto Rico
- Ideology: Statehood

The Puerto Rico Statehood Students Association (PRSSA) —Spanish: Asociación de Estudiantes Estadistas de Puerto Rico— is a Puerto Rican non-profit student organization dedicated to promoting statehood for Puerto Rico. It was founded in 1979, and remained active for two years, becoming inactive 1981–1993, active again 1993 to 1997, inactive once more 1997 to 2007, when it was reactivated once again. (Note: The status of this organization since 2007 (whether active, inactive or dissolved) is not known.)

PRSSA promotes the participation of pro-statehood students in the political process, serves as a pro-statehood student think tank, leads a grassroots approach to lobby the United States Congress, and provides professional development to its members through informational and internship programs.

== History ==
=== First generation ===
PRSSA was founded in August 1979 by then-law student Kenneth McClintock, Puerto Rico's future Secretary of State, and then-college student Luis Fortuño, Puerto Rico's future governor.

The organization was constituted to promote the discussion of Puerto Rico's political status dilemma in mainland United States colleges and universities, promote statehood for America's largest territory and facilitate absentee balloting in the islands' elections for the estimated 15,000 young voting residents of Puerto Rico registered in college campuses throughout the states and Washington, DC.

McClintock served as the association's first president from August 1979 to June 1980, when he graduated from the Tulane University Law School. McClintock was responsible for establishing the PRSSA throughout stateside colleges and universities during his tenure. PRSSA grew to over 500 members and 35 chapters throughout the United States. McClintock also organized the first PRSSA Convention in the now defunct Cerromar Hotel in Vega Alta, Puerto Rico. The three-day convention featured then-congressman and future Senator Paul Simon as keynote speaker, as well as then-Governor Carlos Romero Barceló, statehood patriarch and former Governor Luis A. Ferré and McClintock's predecessor as Secretary of State, Pedro Vázquez, as speakers.

Fortuño, a Georgetown University undergrad, succeeded as the second president from 1980 to 1981. He then organized the PRSSA's absentee voting campaign for the 1980 Puerto Rican general elections. The approximately 1,500 absentee votes garnered by the PRSSA were an important factor in the reelection of Governor Romero Barceló by a 3,000-vote margin.

Among founding PRSSA leaders, Tulane University student Pedro Pierluisi went on to become Attorney General and Resident Commissioner of Puerto Rico, George Washington University student José Rodríguez Suárez went on to become Puerto Rico's Under Secretary of State under three Secretaries of State, Baltasar Corrada del Rio, Norma Burgos and Kenneth McClintock, and José Jaime Pierluisi became Governor Pedro Rosselló's Economic Advisor prior to his untimely death in 1994. Other PRSSA founding members who have been prominent in later life include Francisco Cimadevilla, former Editor-in-Chief at Casiano Communications and current advisor to Gov. Fortuño, Ricardo Skerrett, an immigration attorney in Tampa, Florida and Manuel De Juan, a former assistant director of the Puerto Rico Tourism Company and current advisor to the Fortuño administration.

=== Second generation ===
The PRSSA was dormant from 1981 until 1993, when another group of pro-statehood students led by Oreste R. Ramos, Rogelio Carrasquillo, Roberto Velázquez, Jorge E. Souss, Juan Carlos Galá and Mario Gaztambide reactivated the Association. Former PRSSA president Kenneth McClintock, elected to the Puerto Rico Senate in 1992, helped steer this new incarnation of the PRSSA. Ramos, a student at the University of Pennsylvania and the son of former Puerto Rico Senator Oreste Ramos, presided over the Association from 1993 to 1995 and organized the absentee voting campaign for the 1993 status plebiscite in Puerto Rico. Carrasquillo then presided over the PRSSA from 1995 to 1997 and coordinated the absentee voting campaign that contributed to the reelection of then-Governor Pedro Rosselló in 1996. The organization returned to inactivity after 1997.

=== Third generation ===
José Cabrera and William-José Vélez reactivated the PRSSA in November 2007. On that same year, Javier Aguilú, an undergraduate student at the University of Central Florida, joined forces and helped the organization gain momentum. Cabrera, a University of Dayton School of Law student, served as the Association's fifth president from November 2007 to June 2009. Along with Vice President Velez, Cabrera reestablished chapters nationwide, waged a campaign for young voters in the 2008 Puerto Rican election cycle, launched an educational campaign on statehood throughout Puerto Rico's universities, and began work on the internet-based José Celso Barbosa Statehood Library.

Raúl Vidal y Sepulveda, enrolled at American University's Washington College of Law, began serving as the sixth president in June 2009 and has organized a campaign in support of HR 2499, the Puerto Rico Democracy Act of 2009. He later assumed the post of Assistant Secretary for International Affairs in Puerto Rico's Department of Economic Development and Commerce. Now he is a partner in the private economic development consulting firm, Brickstone Holdings, LLC.

==== 2008 Campaign for Young Voters ====
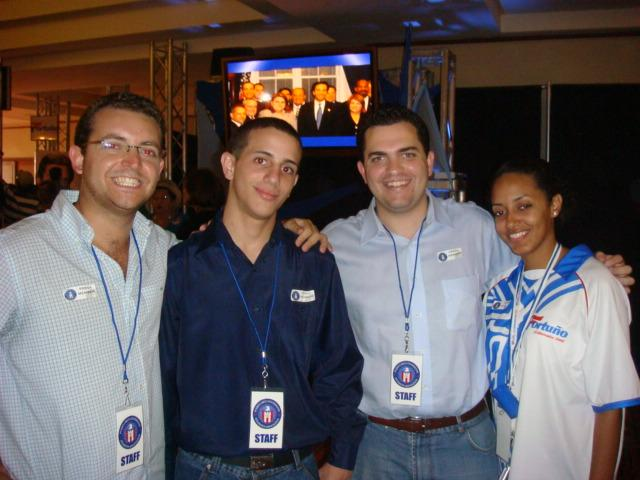
Former PRSSA Executive Director Raúl Vidal, PRSSA Vice President William-José Vélez González, then PRSSA President José Cabrera and then PRSSA Secretary Astrid Martínez at the 2008 New Progressive Party Convention.

The PRSSA waged a voter registration campaign during the winter of 2007–2008 in preparation for the March 2008 primaries of the New Progressive Party, Puerto Rico's pro-statehood party. PRSSA helped mobilize thousands of student votes in Puerto Rico and outside Puerto Rico through absentee balloting. The PRSSA's websites also served as an information center for voters, including electoral status verification tools, voter registration requirements, locations of electoral colleges, and frequently asked questions. On March 9, 2008, the day of the primary, the PRSSA websites provided live results to thousands of people throughout the United States and Puerto Rico and received more than 30,000 visits.

The PRSSA then began an inscription campaign for the November 2008 Puerto Rican general elections during the summer of 2008. On August 11, 2008, the PRSSA held an Absentee Vote Inscription Party in Shannan's Pub of Guaynabo, Puerto Rico, which featured PRSSA founders and NPP candidates Luis Fortuño and Pedro Pierluisi. The Association then held an exhibition during the 2008 New Progressive Party Convention in the Condado Plaza Hotel of San Juan, Puerto Rico. This was followed by a PRSSA-led student registration drive in 22 colleges and universities throughout Puerto Rico. The Puerto Rico State Elections Commission reported in September 2008 that over 200,000 students registered to vote for the first time, a result of the efforts by the PRSSA and other pro-statehood organizations.

On October 8, 2008, PRSSA founder and first president Kenneth McClintock was the guest speaker during the inauguration ceremony of the PRSSA's University of Puerto Rico Río Piedras Chapter, in what constitutes a rare appearance by a New Progressive Party leader at the campus. Previously, the PRSSA had publicly manifested support for the permanence of the Reserve Officer Training Corps (ROTC) near campus grounds. The PRSSA and other local campus organizations also opposed new student regulations presented by the campus administration that were deemed undemocratic by students.

On November 4, 2008, former PRSSA president Luis Fortuño and PRSSA founding member Pedro Pierluisi were elected Governor and Resident Commissioner of Puerto Rico, respectively. On November 11, 2008, Governor-elect Fortuño appointed former PRSSA president Kenneth McClintock as Secretary of State of his upcoming administration. On January 2, 2009, Fortuño was sworn in as the ninth elected Governor of Puerto Rico and McClintock was sworn in as the 22nd Secretary of State of Puerto Rico.

==== 2009 Campaign for Statehood ====
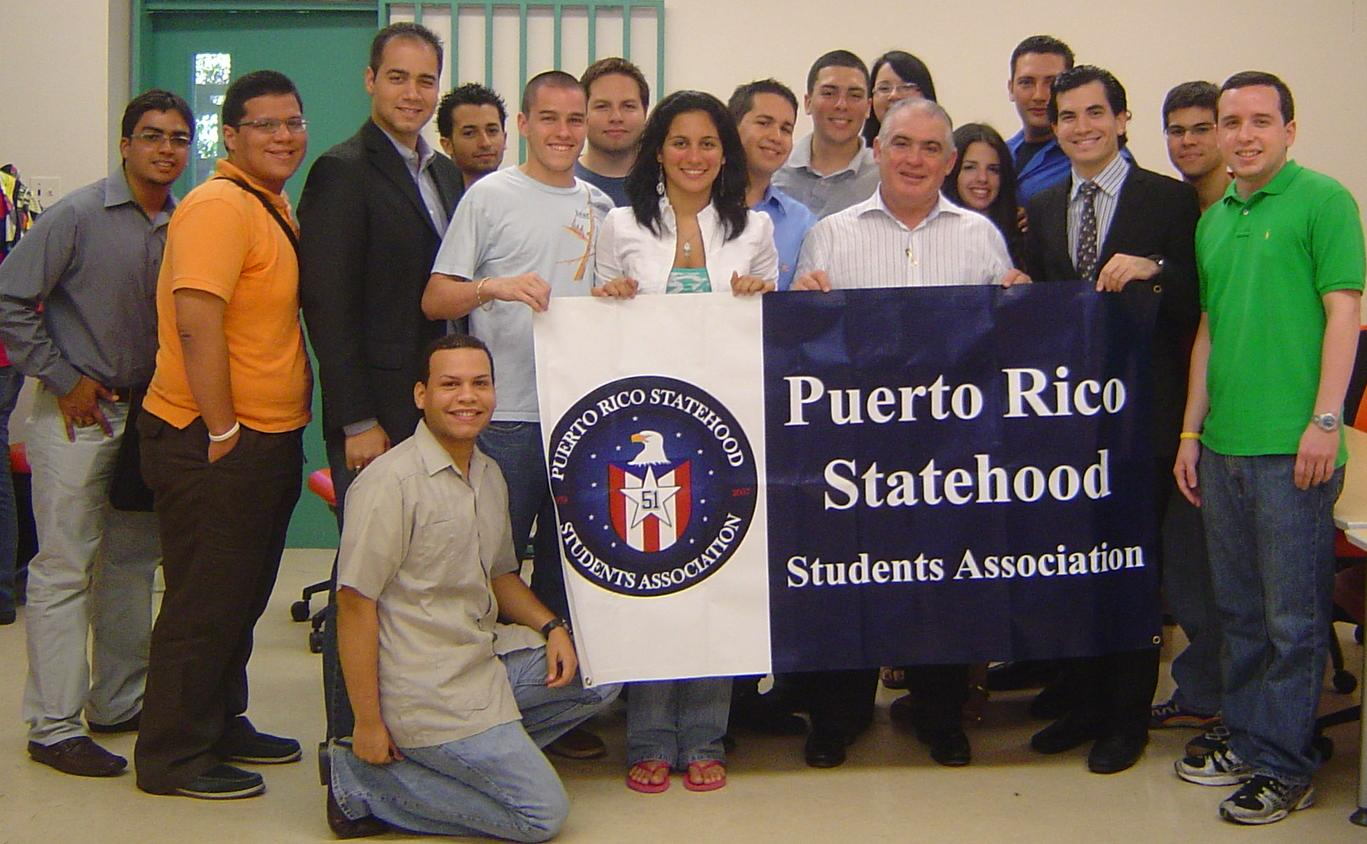
PRSSA UPR-Río Piedras Chapter members with former senator José Garriga Picó during a "Tertulia Estadista" on April 1, 2009.

Following the election, the PRSSA began lobbying Congress for a self-determination referendum for Puerto Rico.

The PRSSA then held a reception on January 19, 2009, with Puerto Rico State Secretary Kenneth McClintock and Puerto Rico Senate President Thomas Rivera Schatz in Washington, DC. Jeffrey Farrow, former co-chair of President Bill Clinton's Working Group on Puerto Rico and former Congressman Robert García of New York also attended the event. The reception provided an opportunity for the young statehooders to begin collaboration with elected officials, professionals, and academics for the purpose of lobbying for a self-determination bill in Congress.

Next the PRSSA Chapters began a series of informal discussions on statehood, called "Tertulias Estadistas", throughout Puerto Rico's universities. One of these, held on April 1, 2009, at the University of Puerto Rico-Río Piedras. Organized by former Rio Piedras Chapter Vice President and President José F. Rovira this conference featured former New Progressive Party senator José Garriga Picó as moderator. Another "Tertulia Estadista" organized by former Rio Piedras Chapter President Efrain Rivera was held at the University of Puerto Rico- Rio Piedras on April 29, 2009, featured Garriga Picó and economist Carlos Colón De Armas. A "tertulia" on H.R. 2499 took place on December 3, 2009, in the University of Puerto Rico at Mayaguez and featured former PRSSA President José Cabrera.

Recently, the PRSSA chapter at the University of Puerto Rico at Mayaguez created a radio program, "La Mirilla Colegial", where PRSSA members discuss statehood, H.R. 2499, and current events. In addition, the chapter at Florida International University hosted a lecture by Maurice Ferré on Puerto Rico and its role in the United States.

===== HR 2499 =====
Former PRSSA President Raúl Vidal y Sepulveda, Resident Commissioner Pedro Pierluisi, Senator Joe Lieberman and Governor Luis Fortuño at a lunch in the Senate Members Dining Room discussing HR 2499.

The PRSSA has been actively promoting The Puerto Rico Democracy Act of 2009, HR 2499 by directly appealing to the members of Congress through meetings and talks. Raul Vidal y Sepulveda, President of the PRSSA, has led and organized this effort, successfully gathering support from different members of Congress and other members of different political sectors.

The PRSSA has also established a lobbying website at HR2499.com. In addition, the organization has been seeking the support of members of Congress, through calls, and emails. The PRSSA also manages the collecting of signatures for the petition in support of the bill at Care2, and the Facebook Application HR 2499.

As part of its ongoing lobbying effort in Congress, in May the PRSSA acquired Connecticut Senator Joe Lieberman's support of Congressman Pedro Pierluisi's 2009 status bill. The PRSSA also submitted a written statement by then PRSSA President Raúl Vidal y Sepulveda in support of H.R. 2499 during a House Natural Resources Committee hearing on June 24, 2009.

As of May 2009, the PRSSA's official group on Facebook, "Statehood for Puerto Rico", has over 6,000 members.

== National Board ==
- Christian Santos – National President
- Melanie Vargas – National Executive Vice-president
- Ramón Ramírez – National Treasurer

== Notable PRSSA Alumni ==
- Luis Fortuño, PRSSA National President (1980-1981), served as Resident Commissioner of Puerto Rico and Governor of Puerto Rico.
- Kenneth McClintock, PRSSA National President (1979-1980), served as President of the Senate of Puerto Rico and Secretary of State of Puerto Rico.
- Pedro Pierluisi, PRSSA Chapter President at Tulane University (1980-1981), is the Governor of Puerto Rico and previously served as Puerto Rico Attorney General and Resident Commissioner of Puerto Rico.
- José Jaime Pierluisi, PRSSA founding member (1979-1981), served as Economic Advisor to the Governor of Puerto Rico.
- José Rodríguez Suárez, PRSSA co-founder (1979-1981), twice served as Deputy Secretary of State of Puerto Rico.
- Francisco Cimadevilla, PRSSA founding member (1979-1981), served as Assistant Secretary of State of Puerto Rico for Caribbean Basin Affairs, Chief Economic Development Officer at the Puerto Rico Department of Economic Development and Commerce, Editor of Caribbean Business, and Vice President and Editor-in-Chief for the Casiano Communications (CCI) media emporium.
- Beatriz Areizaga, PRSSA Chapter President at the Metropolitan Campus of the Inter American University of Puerto Rico (2008-2009), served as the 14th First Lady of Puerto Rico.
- Julio A. Cabral-Corrada, PRSSA Executive Director (2012-2013), became an influential financial analyst and commentator on Puerto Rico's ongoing fiscal crisis and a former Vice President of New York City-based investment firm Stone Lion L.P.
