= Pedro Pierluisi =

Governor of Puerto Rico from 2021 to 2025

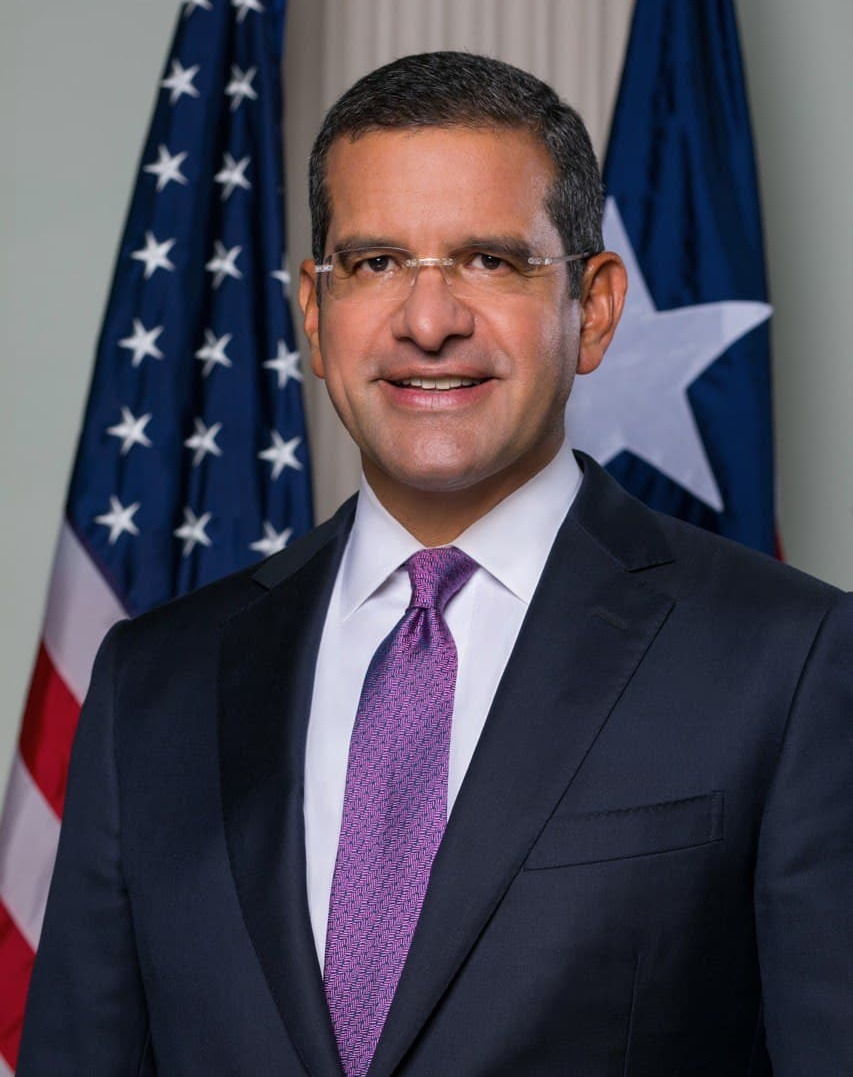
- Pierluisi in 2021

Governor of Puerto Rico
- In office January 2, 2021 – January 2, 2025
- Preceded by: Wanda Vázquez Garced
- Succeeded by: Jenniffer González
- In office August 2, 2019 – August 7, 2019 (Note: Pierluisi's swearing in was deemed unconstitutional and he was removed from office on August 7, 2019. Wanda Vázquez Garced was subsequently sworn in as governor.); De facto
- Preceded by: Ricardo Rosselló
- Succeeded by: Wanda Vázquez Garced

Secretary of State of Puerto Rico
- In office July 31, 2019 – August 2, 2019; Acting
- Preceded by: María Marcano de León (acting)
- Succeeded by: María Marcano de León (acting)

Resident Commissioner of Puerto Rico
- In office January 3, 2009 – January 3, 2017
- Preceded by: Luis Fortuño
- Succeeded by: Jenniffer González

Secretary of Justice of Puerto Rico
- In office January 2, 1993 – January 2, 1997
- Governor: Pedro Rosselló
- Preceded by: Héctor Rivera Cruz
- Succeeded by: José Fuentes Agostini

Personal details
- Born: Pedro Rafael Pierluisi Urrutia; April 26, 1959 (age 67) San Juan, Puerto Rico
- Party: New Progressive
- Other political affiliations: Democratic
- Spouse(s): María Rojo (m. 1981–1998) María Carrión (m. 2007–2019) Fabiola Ansótegui (m. 2024)
- Children: 4
- Relatives: José Jaime Pierluisi (brother)
- Education: Tulane University (BA); George Washington University (JD)

Pedro Rafael Pierluisi Urrutia (born April 26, 1959) is a Puerto Rican politician and lawyer who served as the Governor of Puerto Rico from 2021 to 2025, having previously been the de facto governor from August 2–7, 2019. A member of New Progressive and Democratic Parties, he previously served as acting Secretary of State of Puerto Rico in 2019, as Resident Commissioner of Puerto Rico from 2009 to 2017, and as Secretary of Justice of Puerto Rico from 1993 to 1997. He was formerly a private attorney for Puerto Rico's fiscal oversight board under the Puerto Rico Oversight, Management, and Economic Stability Act.

Pierluisi lost the New Progressive nomination in the 2024 gubernatorial election to Jenniffer González-Colón.

== Early life and education ==
Pierluisi was born on April 26, 1959, in San Juan, Puerto Rico. His parents were Doris Urrutia and Jorge Pierluisi Diaz, former Secretary of Housing of Puerto Rico. He attended Colegio Marista Guaynabo in Guaynabo, graduating in 1977. In 1981, he received a Bachelor of Arts degree in American History from Tulane University, and later earned a Juris Doctor degree from George Washington University Law School in 1984. He was President of the Puerto Rico Statehood Students Association chapter at Tulane University. Later, he was president of the George Washington University Law Society International from 1982 to 1983. During his studies at George Washington University, Pierluisi interned at the congressional office of then-Resident Commissioner of Puerto Rico Baltasar Corrada del Río.

== Professional career ==
Pierluisi first practiced law as a private attorney in Washington, D.C. from 1984 to 1990. He was one of the principal attorneys representing the Government of Peru in its lawsuit against the Hunt Brothers, Nelson Bunker, William Herbert, and Lamar for attempting to corner the silver market in the late 1970s He then practiced law in Puerto Rico from 1990 until 1993.

== Political career ==
=== Early years ===
In 1993, Governor Pedro Rossello nominated Pierluisi to serve as Puerto Rico's Secretary of Justice. His nomination was unanimously confirmed by the Puerto Rican legislature.

=== Secretary of Justice of Puerto Rico ===
In 1993, Pedro Rosselló, upon his election as Governor of Puerto Rico, appointed Pedro Pierluisi as the Secretary of Justice (Attorney General) for his administration. Pierluisi's confirmation was unanimously approved by the Senate of Puerto Rico. In 1994, Pierluisi collaborated with President Bill Clinton's administration, contributing to the efforts that led to the enactment of the Violent Crime Control and Law Enforcement Act. Pierluisi concluded his term as Attorney General in January 1997.

=== Resident Commissioner ===
On May 18, 2007, Pedro Pierluisi declared his candidacy for the position of Resident Commissioner of Puerto Rico, a role that serves as the island's sole representative in the U.S. Congress. In the 2008 elections, Pierluisi was elected by a significant margin. He was part of the New Progressive Party ticket alongside then-Resident Commissioner and gubernatorial candidate Luis Fortuño, following a narrowly contested primary within the party. Pierluisi endorsed Senator Barack Obama of Illinois for the Democratic Party's presidential nomination and served as a co-chair for Obama's campaign efforts in Puerto Rico.

On May 15, 2013, Pierluisi introduced legislation advocating for the admission of Puerto Rico as a state of the United States.

In 2015, Pedro Pierluisi announced his intention to run for Governor of Puerto Rico. However, he was defeated in the primary elections held on June 5, 2016, by Ricky Rosselló, who subsequently became the president of the New Progressive Party and went on to win the governorship.

== U.S. House of Representatives ==
On May 18, 2007, Pierluisi announced his candidacy for Resident Commissioner, Puerto Rico's sole delegate to the United States Congress in the November 2008 elections. He accompanied then current Resident Commissioner and gubernatorial candidate Luis Fortuño in the March 9, 2008 NPP primary ticket. He was Puerto Rico's Resident Commissioner in the US Congress from 2009 to 2016.

Pierluisi is a member of the New Progressive Party in Puerto Rico which advocates statehood for the Island territory. While on Capitol Hill, Pierluisi caucused with the House Democratic Caucus.

As Resident Commissioner, Pierluisi introduced H.R. 2499, which sought to provide for a plebiscite to be held in Puerto Rico to determine the island's ultimate political status. The bill was passed by the House of Representatives but did not receive a vote in the Senate, and lapsed following the sine die adjournment of the 111th Congress. In a separate bill, H.R. 870, Pierluisi sought to add Puerto Rico to Chapter 9 of the U.S. Bankruptcy Code so that the island's government-owned corporations could file for bankruptcy — a privilege they do not enjoy due to the territory's exclusion from the code.

On May 15, 2013, Pierluisi filed H.R. 2000, a bill to admit Puerto Rico as a state.

=== Committee assignments ===
- Committee on the Judiciary (2009-2016)
- Committee on Natural Resources (2009-2016)
- Committee on Education and the Workforce (2009-2010)
- Committee on Ethics (2011-2014)

== Rosselló succession ==
Prior to being elected, Pierluisi was de facto governor of Puerto Rico for five days in August 2019. On July 31 of that year, the embattled governor, Ricardo Rosselló, nominated Pierluisi to serve as Secretary of State of Puerto Rico following a political crisis caused by contentious talks, which culminated in a series of protests and the governor's resignation. Before his resignation became effective, Ricardo Rosselló confirmed Pierluisi as his successor as governor of Puerto Rico. He invoked Act 7 of July 24, 1952 to justify Pierluisi's swearing in. He noted that this law states that "it shall not be necessary for the Secretary of State to have been confirmed to assume the governorship on a permanent basis". Pierluisi was sworn in as governor at 5:01 p.m. at a private residence.

While Pierluisi took office as the acting secretary of state, his position was to be confirmed by the Puerto Rican Senate and the House of Representatives. The following day, members of the Puerto Rican Senate announced that action on his nomination would not occur until August 1. He was sworn into the role as a recess appointment on August 2.

Rosselló then summoned Puerto Rico's Legislative Assembly for them to issue their advice and consent. The House of Representatives approved his nomination 26–21. Following Roselló’s resignation on August 2, Pierluisi became governor, although he had not been confirmed by both the House and the Senate as secretary of state, and Pierluisi affirmed Rosselló's declaration.

On August 5, the Puerto Rico Senate filed a lawsuit against his appointment as governor by contending that unless he obtained the Senate's assent, his governorship was unconstitutional. After a petition from the Senate of Puerto Rico on August 7, Pierluisi's accession to the governorship was challenged in the Supreme Court of Puerto Rico. The Puerto Rico Supreme Court ruled that the law that enabled his swearing in was unconstitutional and ordered the succession take place per Law 7 of 1952, as opposed to Law 7 of 2005. Thus, he was the shortest-serving official in that position in Puerto Rico's history.

The Supreme Court was expected to determine the constitutionality of the inauguration. Following a petition from the Senate of Puerto Rico, shortly after assuming office, Pierluisi made his way to La Fortaleza, the governor's official residence, to deliver an official statement.

== 2020 elections ==
On August 16, 2020, Pierluisi won the PNP gubernatorial primary race against governor Wanda Vázquez Garced. With 75.6% of voting stations reporting, Pierluisi has won about 57.9% of the votes over Vazquez's 42.1%, clinching the nomination for New Progressive Party. On November 3, 2020, Pierluisi was elected as the Governor of Puerto Rico. He received approximately 32.9% of all the votes, distributed among 6 candidates that ran for office.

On Saturday, January 2, 2021, Pierluisi took the oath of office. At 8:00 a.m., there was a private ceremony in which he took the oath from the Chief Justice of the Supreme Court, Maite Oronoz Rodríguez. This had been followed by a public ceremony on the northern side of the Capitol of Puerto Rico, where Pierluisi retook the oath of office publicly and gave his inaugural address.

== Governor of Puerto Rico ==
On January 2, 2021, Pierluisi was inaugurated as Governor of Puerto Rico in a ceremony that, despite being well-attended, was held with a lower number of participants compared to previous events due to the COVID-19 pandemic. The most notable international attendee at the ceremony was Luis Abinader, the President of the Dominican Republic.

Pedro Pierluisi, similar to previous governors from the New Progressive Party (Spanish: Partido Nuevo Progresista, PNP) advocated for Puerto Rico's statehood during his campaign. Following the 2020 general election, in which a plebiscite was held regarding the island's political status, Pierluisi vetoed a bill from the House that aimed to repeal HB-65-2020 and HB-167-2020. These pieces of legislation were designed to facilitate an election for selecting statehood lobbyists, whose role would be to advocate for Puerto Rico's statehood before the U.S. Congress.

On January 24, 2021, in response to the increasing incidents of gender-based violence, the Governor of Puerto Rico declared a state of emergency regarding this issue. This action came in the aftermath of the tragic murder of Andrea Ruiz by her ex-partner, an event that the Governor cited as a clear failure of the system to protect victims of domestic violence. Consequently, he directed the Secretary of Justice to ensure, whether through legislative or regulatory means, that a public prosecutor is always present in cases of domestic violence, aiming to strengthen the legal response to such incidents.

On March 15, the Governor announced that the State of Emergency regarding maritime transportation to the islands of Vieques and Culebra would need to continue until 2022, coinciding with the conclusion of the privatization process for the ferry service. This statement came in the wake of protests concerning the ferry service, which escalated into confrontations between the protesters and law enforcement agents. In response to these events, the Governor expressed his support for the actions taken by the United Rapid Action Forces (FURA), a specialized unit of the Puerto Rico Police Department.

During the tenure of the Governor, a notable conflict arose between the executive branch and the legislature over the nomination of Elba Aponte for the position of Secretary of Education. Following a hearing, the House of Representatives declined to approve Aponte's nomination. Consequently, on April 17, the Governor retracted the nomination of Elba Aponte for this key cabinet position.

In response to demands from various sectors to terminate the government's agreement with LUMA Energy, the Governor expressed criticism of these appeals. He asserted that the contract with LUMA Energy would not lead to higher electricity costs for consumers and argued that privatizing the power grid represents the best interest for the island's future.

In February 2023, Pedro Pierluisi pleaded before the Senate in Washington D.C. for the United States of America to approve the bill which provides for an electoral consultation in Puerto Rico between the options of American statehood, independence or of independence in free association with the United States of America.

On October 1, 2023, Pedro Pierluisi announced his intention to run for a second term as Governor of Puerto Rico during an event held at the Puerto Rico Convention Center. This announcement was made in the presence of prominent leaders from the New Progressive Party (NPP), including former Senate President Thomas Rivera Schatz and San Juan Mayor Miguel Romero. Pierluisi is set to compete in the primary elections against Jenniffer González, the current Resident Commissioner and his former running mate in the 2020 elections.

In June 2024, Pedro Pierluisi obtained a hearing in the Senate of the United States of America, concerning draft statute 3231, from Democrat Martin Heinrich. This measure is the Senate version of House Bill 2757 and provides for a binding plebiscite authorized by the U.S. Congress that allows residents of Puerto Rico to choose between U.S. statehood and full independence. and sovereignty in free association with the United States of America.

== 2024 elections ==
On March 20, 2022, during the New Progressive Party's general assembly, governor Pedro Pierluisi announced that he would run for a second term. In an interview on August 28, he reaffirmed the press that he would be in fact running again, stating that "Puerto Rico is moving forward and there is no one who can stop us" and that they were "going to beat the PDP".

=== 2024 primary election loss ===
Pedro Pierluisi lost the June 2, 2024 primary elections to Jenniffer González Colón of the New Progressive Party, conceding the candidacy for governor after the preliminary result was certified by the State Elections Commission.

== After governate ==
In June 2025, Pedro Pierluisi participated in a public event for the first time as a practicing attorney at the 2025 Annual Convention of the Puerto Rico Bar Association.

== Personal life ==
Governor Pierluisi is the father of four adult children: Anthony, Michael, Rafael, and Jacqueline. He is the grandfather of six grandchildren.

His first marriage was to María Eugenia Rojo, with whom he shares his four children. They married on June 20, 1981 but divorced in the late 1990s. Pierluisi married again to businesswoman María Elena Carrión. However, the couple divorced in 2019. He is currently married to attorney Fabiola Ansótegui. The couple announced their engagement in 2023 and were married in a private ceremony on December 8, 2024.

Pierluisi's father, Jorge Pierluisi, served as Secretary of Puerto Rico's Housing Department under Gov. Carlos Romero Barceló from 1977 to 1985. His brother, José Jaime Pierluisi, an economic adviser to then governor Pedro Rossello, was shot and killed during a carjacking in 1994. His sister Caridad Pierluisi has served as an advisor to him during his tenure as governor.

Pierluisi is of Corsican descent. He is a part of the Corsican diaspora in Puerto Rico.

== Honors ==
- Spain: Grand Cross of the Order of Isabella the Catholic

== See also ==
- List of Hispanic Americans in the United States Congress

== Notes ==
Legal offices
Preceded by Héctor Rivera Cruz	Secretary of Justice of Puerto Rico; 1993–1997	Succeeded by José Fuentes Agostini
Preceded by María Marcano de León; Acting	Secretary of State of Puerto Rico; Acting; 2019	Succeeded by María Marcano de León; Acting
U.S. House of Representatives
Preceded by Luis Fortuño	Resident Commissioner of Puerto Rico; 2009–2017	Succeeded by Jenniffer González
Party political offices
Preceded by Luis Fortuño	Chair of the Puerto Rico New Progressive Party; 2013–2016	Succeeded by Ricardo Rosselló
Preceded by Thomas Rivera Schatz; Acting	Chair of the Puerto Rico New Progressive Party; 2020–2024	Succeeded by Jenniffer González
Preceded by Ricardo Rosselló	New Progressive nominee for Governor of Puerto Rico; 2020	Succeeded by Jenniffer González
Political offices
Preceded by Ricardo Rosselló	Governor of Puerto Rico; De facto 2019	Succeeded by Wanda Vázquez Garced
Preceded by Wanda Vázquez Garced	Governor of Puerto Rico; 2021–2025	Succeeded by Jenniffer González
