= Samuel Morton Rutherford =

Samuel Morton Rutherford may refer to:

- Samuel Morton Rutherford (Arkansas politician) (1797–1867), member of the Arkansas Legislature and Territorial Treasurer of Arkansas
- Samuel Morton Rutherford (Oklahoma politician) (1859–1922), U.S. Marshal for Indian Territory and member of the Oklahoma Senate
- Samuel Morton Rutherford Jr. (1894–1978), member of the Oklahoma Senate
