= List of United States representatives in the 48th Congress =

This is a complete list of United States representatives during the 48th United States Congress listed by seniority.

As an historical article, the districts and party affiliations listed reflect those during the 48th Congress (March 4, 1883 – March 3, 1885). Seats and party affiliations on similar lists for other congresses will be different for certain members.

Seniority depends on the date on which members were sworn into office. Since many members are sworn in on the same day, subsequent ranking is based on previous congressional service of the individual and then by alphabetical order by the last name of the representative.

Committee chairmanship in the House is often associated with seniority. However, party leadership is typically not associated with seniority.

Note: The "*" indicates that the representative/delegate may have served one or more non-consecutive terms while in the House of Representatives of the United States Congress.

== U.S. House seniority list ==
U.S. House seniority
Rank	Representative	Party	District	Seniority date (Previous service, if any)	No.# of term(s)	Notes
1	William D. Kelley	R	PA-04	March 4, 1861	12th term	Dean of the House
2	Samuel J. Randall	D	PA-03	March 4, 1863	11th term	
3	Richard P. Bland	D	MO-11	March 4, 1873	6th term	
4	James Henderson Blount	D	GA-06	March 4, 1873	6th term	
5	Aylett Hawes Buckner	D	MO-07	March 4, 1873	6th term	Left the House in 1885.
6	Joseph Gurney Cannon	R	IL-15	March 4, 1873	6th term	
7	Roger Q. Mills	D	TX-09	March 4, 1873	6th term	
8	William Ralls Morrison	D	IL-18	March 4, 1873; Previous service, 1863–1865.	7th term*	
9	Charles O'Neill	R	PA-02	March 4, 1873; Previous service, 1863–1871.	10th term*	
10	Abraham Herr Smith	R	PA-09	March 4, 1873	6th term	Left the House in 1885.
11	Robert B. Vance	D	NC-08	March 4, 1873	6th term	Left the House in 1885.
12	Samuel S. Cox	D	NY-06	November 4, 1873; Previous service, 1857–1865 and 1869–1873.	12th term**	
13	Joseph Clay Stiles Blackburn	D	KY-07	March 4, 1875	5th term	Left the House in 1885.
14	George Cabell	D	VA-05	March 4, 1875	5th term	
15	David B. Culberson	D	TX-04	March 4, 1875	5th term	
16	George Gibbs Dibrell	D	TN-03	March 4, 1875	5th term	Left the House in 1885.
17	E. John Ellis	D	LA-02	March 4, 1875	5th term	Left the House in 1885.
18	William H. Forney	D	AL-07	March 4, 1875	5th term	
19	Thomas J. Henderson	R	IL-07	March 4, 1875	5th term	
20	Hernando Money	D	MS-04	March 4, 1875	5th term	Left the House in 1885.
21	John Henninger Reagan	D	TX-02	March 4, 1875; Previous service, 1857–1861.	7th term*	
22	Alfred Moore Scales	D	NC-05	March 4, 1875; Previous service, 1857–1859.	6th term*	Resigned on December 30, 1884.
23	Otho R. Singleton	D	MS-05	March 4, 1875; Previous service, 1853–1855 and 1857–1861.	8th term**	
24	William McKendree Springer	D	IL-13	March 4, 1875	5th term	
25	John R. Tucker	D	VA-06	March 4, 1875	5th term	
26	John T. Wait	R	CT-03	April 12, 1876	5th term	
27	D. Wyatt Aiken	D	SC-03	March 4, 1877	4th term	
28	Thomas McKee Bayne	R	PA-23	March 4, 1877	4th term	
29	Thomas M. Browne	R	IN-06	March 4, 1877	4th term	
30	William H. Calkins	R	IN-13	March 4, 1877	4th term	Resigned on October 20, 1884.
31	John G. Carlisle	D	KY-06	March 4, 1877	4th term	Speaker of the House
32	Thomas R. Cobb	D	IN-02	March 4, 1877	4th term	
33	Robert H. M. Davidson	D	FL-01	March 4, 1877	4th term	
34	John H. Evins	D	SC-04	March 4, 1877	4th term	Died on October 20, 1884.
35	Alfred C. Harmer	R	PA-05	March 4, 1877; Previous service, 1871–1875.	6th term*	
36	Dudley C. Haskell	R	KS-02	March 4, 1877	4th term	Died on December 16, 1883.
37	Hilary A. Herbert	D	AL-02	March 4, 1877	4th term	
38	Frank Hiscock	R	NY-25	March 4, 1877	4th term	
39	J. Warren Keifer	R	OH-08	March 4, 1877	4th term	Left the House in 1885.
40	John H. Ketcham	R	NY-13	March 4, 1877; Previous service, 1865–1873.	8th term*	
41	William McKinley	R	OH-18	March 4, 1877	4th term	Resigned on May 27, 1884.
42	Leopold Morse	D	MA-05	March 4, 1877	4th term	Left the House in 1885.
43	Henry L. Muldrow	D	MS-01	March 4, 1877	4th term	Left the House in 1885.
44	Thomas Brackett Reed	R	ME	March 4, 1877	4th term	
45	William W. Rice	R	MA-10	March 4, 1877	4th term	
46	George D. Robinson	R	MA-12	March 4, 1877	4th term	Resigned on January 7, 1884.
47	Thomas Ryan	R	KS-03	March 4, 1877	4th term	
48	Richard W. Townshend	D	IL-19	March 4, 1877	4th term	
49	Albert S. Willis	D	KY-05	March 4, 1877	4th term	
50	John Alexander Anderson	R	KS-01	March 4, 1879	3rd term	
51	James B. Belford	R	CO	March 4, 1879; Previous service, 1876–1877.	5th term*	Left the House in 1885.
52	Henry H. Bingham	R	PA-01	March 4, 1879	3rd term	
53	Martin L. Clardy	D	MO-10	March 4, 1879	3rd term	
54	George L. Converse	D	OH-13	March 4, 1879	3rd term	Left the House in 1885.
55	George R. Davis	R	IL-03	March 4, 1879	3rd term	Left the House in 1885.
56	Lowndes Henry Davis	D	MO-14	March 4, 1879	3rd term	Left the House in 1885.
57	Peter V. Deuster	D	WI-04	March 4, 1879	3rd term	Left the House in 1885.
58	Poindexter Dunn	D	AR-01	March 4, 1879	3rd term	
59	George W. Geddes	D	OH-14	March 4, 1879	3rd term	
60	Nathaniel Job Hammond	D	GA-05	March 4, 1879	3rd term	
61	William H. Hatch	D	MO-01	March 4, 1879	3rd term	
62	Thomas H. Herndon	D	AL-01	March 4, 1879	3rd term	Died on March 28, 1883.
63	Roswell G. Horr	R	MI-08	March 4, 1879	3rd term	Left the House in 1885.
64	Leonidas C. Houk	R	TN-02	March 4, 1879	3rd term	
65	J. Floyd King	D	LA-05	March 4, 1879	3rd term	
66	Benjamin Le Fevre	D	OH-04	March 4, 1879	3rd term	
67	Moses A. McCoid	R	IA-01	March 4, 1879	3rd term	Left the House in 1885.
68	Benton McMillin	D	TN-04	March 4, 1879	3rd term	
69	William A. Russell	R	MA-08	March 4, 1879	3rd term	Left the House in 1885.
70	Joshua Frederick Cockey Talbott	D	MD-02	March 4, 1879	3rd term	Left the House in 1885.
71	John R. Thomas	R	IL-20	March 4, 1879	3rd term	
72	Philip B. Thompson, Jr.	D	KY-08	March 4, 1879	3rd term	Left the House in 1885.
73	Oscar Turner	D	KY-01	March 4, 1879	3rd term	Left the House in 1885.
74	Edward K. Valentine	R	NE	March 4, 1879	3rd term	Left the House in 1885.
75	William D. Washburn	R	MN-04	March 4, 1879	3rd term	Left the House in 1885.
76	Olin Wellborn	D	TX-06	March 4, 1879	3rd term	
77	Thomas Williams	D	AL-05	March 4, 1879	3rd term	Left the House in 1885.
78	Waldo Hutchins	D	NY-12	November 4, 1879	3rd term	Left the House in 1885.
79	Ezra B. Taylor	R	OH-19	December 13, 1880	3rd term	
80	Ossian Ray	R	NH-02	January 8, 1881	3rd term	Left the House in 1885.
81	John S. Barbour, Jr.	D	VA-08	March 4, 1881	2nd term	
82	Samuel Fleming Barr	R	PA-14	March 4, 1881	2nd term	Left the House in 1885.
83	Lewis Beach	D	NY-14	March 4, 1881	2nd term	
84	Perry Belmont	D	NY-01	March 4, 1881	2nd term	
85	Newton C. Blanchard	D	LA-04	March 4, 1881	2nd term	
86	J. Hart Brewer	R	NJ-02	March 4, 1881	2nd term	Left the House in 1885.
87	Charles N. Brumm	G	PA-13	March 4, 1881	2nd term	
88	Hugh Buchanan	D	GA-04	March 4, 1881	2nd term	Left the House in 1885.
89	Jacob Miller Campbell	R	PA-17	March 4, 1881; Previous service, 1877–1879.	3rd term*	
90	George Williams Cassidy	D	NV	March 4, 1881	2nd term	Left the House in 1885.
91	Jonathan Chace	R	RI-02	March 4, 1881	2nd term	Resigned on January 26, 1885.
92	Judson C. Clements	D	GA-07	March 4, 1881	2nd term	
93	George Washington Covington	D	MD-01	March 4, 1881	2nd term	Left the House in 1885.
94	William Ruffin Cox	D	NC-04	March 4, 1881	2nd term	
95	William Cullen	R	IL-08	March 4, 1881	2nd term	Left the House in 1885.
96	Andrew Gregg Curtin	D	PA-20	March 4, 1881	2nd term	
97	Marsena E. Cutts	R	IA-06	March 4, 1881	2nd term	Died on September 1, 1883.
98	Clement Dowd	D	NC-06	March 4, 1881	2nd term	Left the House in 1885.
99	Daniel Ermentrout	D	PA-08	March 4, 1881	2nd term	
100	Melvin Clark George	R	OR	March 4, 1881	2nd term	Left the House in 1885.
101	Richard W. Guenther	R	WI-06	March 4, 1881	2nd term	
102	William Peters Hepburn	R	IA-08	March 4, 1881	2nd term	
103	Abram Hewitt	D	NY-10	March 4, 1881; Previous service, 1875–1879.	4th term*	
104	Goldsmith W. Hewitt	D	AL-06	March 4, 1881; Previous service, 1875–1879.	4th term*	Left the House in 1885.
105	Fetter Schrier Hoblitzell	D	MD-03	March 4, 1881	2nd term	Left the House in 1885.
106	William S. Holman	D	IN-04	March 4, 1881; Previous service, 1859–1865 and 1867–1877.	10th term**	
107	James Kimbrough Jones	D	AR-02	March 4, 1881	2nd term	Resigned on February 19, 1885.
108	John A. Kasson	R	IA-07	March 4, 1881; Previous service, 1863–1867 and 1873–1877.	6th term**	Resigned on July 13, 1884.
109	Edward S. Lacey	R	MI-03	March 4, 1881	2nd term	Left the House in 1885.
110	Courtland C. Matson	D	IN-05	March 4, 1881	2nd term	
111	Samuel Henry Miller	R	PA-26	March 4, 1881	2nd term	Left the House in 1885.
112	Henry Lee Morey	R	OH-07	March 4, 1881	2nd term	Resigned on June 20, 1884.
113	Samuel W. Moulton	D	IL-17	March 4, 1881; Previous service, 1865–1867.	3rd term*	Left the House in 1885.
114	William Mutchler	D	PA-10	March 4, 1881; Previous service, 1875–1877.	3rd term*	Left the House in 1885.
115	William C. Oates	D	AL-03	March 4, 1881	2nd term	
116	Abraham X. Parker	R	NY-19	March 4, 1881	2nd term	
117	John Paul	D	VA-07	March 4, 1881	2nd term	Resigned on September 5, 1883.
118	Lewis E. Payson	R	IL-09	March 4, 1881	2nd term	
119	Stanton J. Peelle	R	IN-07	March 4, 1881	2nd term	Resigned on May 22, 1884.
120	Augustus Herman Pettibone	R	TN-01	March 4, 1881	2nd term	
121	Ambrose Ranney	R	MA-03	March 4, 1881	2nd term	
122	James S. Robinson	R	OH-09	March 4, 1881	2nd term	Resigned on January 12, 1885.
123	William Erigena Robinson	D	NY-02	March 4, 1881; Previous service, 1867–1869.	3rd term*	Left the House in 1885.
124	William Rosecrans	D	CA-01	March 4, 1881	2nd term	Left the House in 1885.
125	George Washington Steele	R	IN-11	March 4, 1881	2nd term	
126	Strother M. Stockslager	D	IN-03	March 4, 1881	2nd term	Left the House in 1885.
127	Eben F. Stone	R	MA-07	March 4, 1881	2nd term	
128	Horace B. Strait	R	MN-03	March 4, 1881; Previous service, 1873–1879.	5th term*	
129	Henry G. Turner	D	GA-02	March 4, 1881	2nd term	
130	Richard Warner	D	TN-05	March 4, 1881	2nd term	Left the House in 1885.
131	John D. White	R	KY-10	March 4, 1881; Previous service, 1875–1877.	3rd term*	Left the House in 1885.
132	George D. Wise	D	VA-03	March 4, 1881	2nd term	
133	Nelson Dingley, Jr.	R	ME	September 12, 1881	2nd term	
134	Charles R. Skinner	R	NY-22	November 8, 1881	2nd term	Left the House in 1885.
135	James Wolcott Wadsworth	R	NY-27	November 8, 1881	2nd term	Left the House in 1885.
136	John Hardy	D	NY-09	December 5, 1881	2nd term	Left the House in 1885.
137	Henry J. Spooner	R	RI-01	December 5, 1881	2nd term	
138	Edmund William McGregor Mackey	R	SC-07	May 31, 1882; Previous service, 1875–1876.	3rd term*	Died on January 27, 1884.
139	Horatio Bisbee, Jr.	R	FL-02	June 1, 1882; Previous service, 1877–1879 and 1881.	4th term**	Left the House in 1885.
140	Charles M. Shelley	D	AL-04	November 7, 1882; Previous service, 1877–1882.	5th term*	Resigned on January 9, 1885.
141	Robert R. Hitt	R	IL-06	December 4, 1882	2nd term	
142	Seaborn Reese	D	GA-08	December 4, 1882	2nd term	
143	Joseph D. Taylor	R	OH-15	January 2, 1883	2nd term	Left the House in 1885.
144	George E. Adams	R	IL-04	March 4, 1883	1st term	
145	John J. Adams	D	NY-08	March 4, 1883	1st term	
146	Armstead M. Alexander	D	MO-02	March 4, 1883	1st term	Left the House in 1885.
147	Louis E. Atkinson	R	PA-18	March 4, 1883	1st term	
148	John Arnot, Jr.	D	NY-29	March 4, 1883	1st term	
149	John H. Bagley, Jr.	D	NY-15	March 4, 1883; Previous service, 1875–1877.	2nd term*	Left the House in 1885.
150	John Goff Ballentine	D	TN-07	March 4, 1883	1st term	
151	Ethelbert Barksdale	D	MS-07	March 4, 1883	1st term	
152	Risden Tyler Bennett	D	NC	March 4, 1883	1st term	
153	Charles A. Boutelle	R	ME	March 4, 1883	1st term	
154	Henry Bowen	D	VA-09	March 4, 1883	1st term	Left the House in 1885.
155	Charles Edmund Boyle	D	PA-21	March 4, 1883	1st term	
156	Samuel Myron Brainerd	R	PA-27	March 4, 1883	1st term	Left the House in 1885.
157	Clifton R. Breckinridge	D	AR	March 4, 1883	1st term	
158	Edward Breitung	R	MI-11	March 4, 1883	1st term	Left the House in 1885.
159	Francis B. Brewer	R	NY-33	March 4, 1883	1st term	Left the House in 1885.
160	James Broadhead	D	MO-09	March 4, 1883	1st term	Left the House in 1885.
161	William Wallace Brown	R	PA-16	March 4, 1883	1st term	
162	James Budd	D	CA-02	March 4, 1883	1st term	Left the House in 1885.
163	Henry G. Burleigh	R	NY-17	March 4, 1883	1st term	
164	James N. Burnes	D	MO-04	March 4, 1883	1st term	
165	Andrew Jackson Caldwell	D	TN-06	March 4, 1883	1st term	
166	Felix Campbell	D	NY-04	March 4, 1883	1st term	
167	Allen D. Candler	D	GA-09	March 4, 1883	1st term	
168	Ezra C. Carleton	D	MI-07	March 4, 1883	1st term	
169	James Franklin Clay	D	KY-02	March 4, 1883	1st term	Left the House in 1885.
170	Charles Frederick Crisp	D	GA-03	March 4, 1883	1st term	
171	Patrick Collins	D	MA-04	March 4, 1883	1st term	
172	Daniel W. Connolly	D	PA-12	March 4, 1883	1st term	Left the House in 1885.
173	John Cosgrove	D	MO-06	March 4, 1883	1st term	Left the House in 1885.
174	William Wirt Culbertson	R	KY-09	March 4, 1883	1st term	Left the House in 1885.
175	Byron M. Cutcheon	R	MI-09	March 4, 1883	1st term	
176	George W. Dargan	D	SC-06	March 4, 1883	1st term	
177	Robert T. Davis	R	MA-01	March 4, 1883	1st term	
178	Samuel Dibble	D	SC-01	March 4, 1883; Previous service, 1881–1882.	2nd term*	
179	Alexander Monroe Dockery	D	MO-03	March 4, 1883	1st term	
180	William Dorsheimer	D	NY-07	March 4, 1883	1st term	Left the House in 1885.
181	William Addison Duncan	D	PA-19	March 4, 1883	1st term	Died on November 14, 1884.
182	Ransom W. Dunham	R	IL-01	March 4, 1883	1st term	
183	William W. Eaton	D	CT-01	March 4, 1883	1st term	Left the House in 1885.
184	Nathaniel B. Eldredge	D	MI-02	March 4, 1883	1st term	
185	Mortimer Fitzland Elliott	D	PA	March 4, 1883	1st term	Left the House in 1885.
186	Reuben Ellwood	R	IL-05	March 4, 1883	1st term	
187	Isaac Newton Evans	R	PA-07	March 4, 1883; Previous service, 1877–1879.	2nd term*	
188	James Bowen Everhart	R	PA-06	March 4, 1883	1st term	
189	Thomas M. Ferrell	D	NJ-01	March 4, 1883	1st term	Left the House in 1885.
190	John Van Lear Findlay	D	MD-04	March 4, 1883	1st term	
191	John F. Finerty	D	IL-02	March 4, 1883	1st term	Left the House in 1885.
192	William H. F. Fiedler	D	NJ-06	March 4, 1883	1st term	Left the House in 1885.
193	John F. Follett	D	OH-01	March 4, 1883	1st term	Left the House in 1885.
194	Martin A. Foran	D	OH-21	March 4, 1883	1st term	
195	Robert Washington Fyan	D	MO-13	March 4, 1883	1st term	Left the House in 1885.
196	Eustace Gibson	D	WV-04	March 4, 1883	1st term	
197	John R. Glascock	D	CA	March 4, 1883	1st term	Left the House in 1885.
198	Nathan Goff, Jr.	R	WV-01	March 4, 1883	1st term	
199	Alexander Graves	D	MO-05	March 4, 1883	1st term	Left the House in 1885.
200	Halbert S. Greenleaf	D	NY-30	March 4, 1883	1st term	Left the House in 1885.
201	Wharton J. Green	D	NC-03	March 4, 1883	1st term	
202	John Edward Halsell	D	KY-03	March 4, 1883	1st term	
203	Lewis Hanback	R	KS	March 4, 1883	1st term	
204	John Hancock	D	TX-10	March 4, 1883; Previous service, 1871–1877.	4th term*	Left the House in 1885.
205	Thomas Hardeman, Jr.	D	GA-10	March 4, 1883; Previous service, 1859–1861.	2nd term*	Left the House in 1885.
206	Alphonso Hart	D	OH-12	March 4, 1883	1st term	Left the House in 1885.
207	Herschel H. Hatch	R	MI-10	March 4, 1883	1st term	Left the House in 1885.
208	Martin Alonzo Haynes	R	NH-01	March 4, 1883	1st term	
209	John J. Hemphill	D	SC-05	March 4, 1883	1st term	
210	David B. Henderson	R	IA-03	March 4, 1883	1st term	
211	Barclay Henley	D	CA-03	March 4, 1883	1st term	
212	William D. Hill	D	OH-06	March 4, 1883; Previous service, 1879–1881.	2nd term*	
213	Adoniram J. Holmes	R	IA-10	March 4, 1883	1st term	
214	Hart Benton Holton	R	MD-05	March 4, 1883	1st term	Left the House in 1885.
215	Benjamin Stephen Hooper	D	VA-04	March 4, 1883	1st term	Left the House in 1885.
216	James Herron Hopkins	D	PA-22	March 4, 1883; Previous service, 1875–1877.	2nd term*	Left the House in 1885.
217	Julius Houseman	D	MI-05	March 4, 1883	1st term	Left the House in 1885.
218	Benjamin Franklin Howey	R	NJ-04	March 4, 1883	1st term	Left the House in 1885.
219	Carleton Hunt	D	LA-01	March 4, 1883	1st term	Left the House in 1885.
220	Frank H. Hurd	D	OH-10	March 4, 1883; Previous service, 1875–1877 and 1879–1881.	3rd term**	Left the House in 1885.
221	Darwin R. James	R	NY-03	March 4, 1883	1st term	
222	Elza Jeffords	R	MS-03	March 4, 1883	1st term	Left the House in 1885.
223	Frederick A. Johnson	R	NY-18	March 4, 1883	1st term	
224	Burr W. Jones	D	WI-03	March 4, 1883	1st term	Left the House in 1885.
225	James H. Jones	D	TX-03	March 4, 1883	1st term	
226	Isaac M. Jordan	D	OH-02	March 4, 1883	1st term	Left the House in 1885.
227	John Kean	R	NJ-03	March 4, 1883	1st term	Left the House in 1885.
228	William Pitt Kellogg	R	LA-03	March 4, 1883	1st term	Left the House in 1885.
229	John J. Kleiner	D	IN-01	March 4, 1883	1st term	
230	James Laird	R	NE-02	March 4, 1883	1st term	
231	John Edward Lamb	D	IN-08	March 4, 1883	1st term	Left the House in 1885.
232	S. W. T. Lanham	D	TX-11	March 4, 1883	1st term	
233	George Van Eman Lawrence	R	PA-24	March 4, 1883; Previous service, 1865–1869.	3rd term*	Left the House in 1885.
234	Charles Le Moyne Mitchell	D	CT-02	March 4, 1883	1st term	
235	Edward T. Lewis	D	LA-06	March 4, 1883	1st term	Left the House in 1885.
236	Harry Libbey	R	VA-02	March 4, 1883	1st term	
237	John Davis Long	R	MA-02	March 4, 1883	1st term	
238	Charles B. Lore	D	DE	March 4, 1883	1st term	
239	Henry B. Lovering	D	MA-06	March 4, 1883	1st term	
240	Robert Lowry	D	IN-12	March 4, 1883	1st term	
241	Theodore Lyman	R	MA-09	March 4, 1883	1st term	Left the House in 1885.
242	William C. Maybury	D	MI-01	March 4, 1883	1st term	
243	Robert Murphy Mayo	R	VA-01	March 4, 1883	1st term	Resigned on March 20, 1884.
244	William McAdoo	D	NJ-07	March 4, 1883	1st term	
245	Louis E. McComas	R	MD-06	March 4, 1883	1st term	
246	John W. McCormick	R	OH-11	March 4, 1883	1st term	Left the House in 1885.
247	Stephen C. Millard	R	NY-28	March 4, 1883	1st term	
248	Seth L. Milliken	R	ME	March 4, 1883	1st term	
249	James Francis Miller	D	TX-08	March 4, 1883	1st term	
250	Charles Henry Morgan	D	MO-12	March 4, 1883; Previous service, 1875–1879.	3rd term*	Left the House in 1885.
251	Edmund Needham Morrill	R	KS	March 4, 1883	1st term	
252	Nicholas Muller	D	NY-05	March 4, 1883; Previous service, 1877–1881.	3rd term*	
253	Jeremiah Henry Murphy	D	IA-02	March 4, 1883	1st term	
254	Robert Maynard Murray	D	OH-03	March 4, 1883	1st term	Left the House in 1885.
255	William H. Neece	D	IL-11	March 4, 1883	1st term	
256	Knute Nelson	R	MN-05	March 4, 1883	1st term	
257	John C. Nicholls	D	GA-01	March 4, 1883; Previous service, 1879–1881.	2nd term*	Left the House in 1885.
258	Newton W. Nutting	R	NY-24	March 4, 1883	1st term	Left the House in 1885.
259	Thomas P. Ochiltree	D	TX-07	March 4, 1883	1st term	Left the House in 1885.
260	James E. O'Hara	R	NC-02	March 4, 1883	1st term	
261	John J. O'Neill	D	MO-08	March 4, 1883	1st term	
262	David R. Paige	D	OH-20	March 4, 1883	1st term	Left the House in 1885.
263	John Denniston Patton	D	PA-25	March 4, 1883	1st term	Left the House in 1885.
264	Sereno E. Payne	R	NY-26	March 4, 1883	1st term	
265	Samuel W. Peel	D	AR-04	March 4, 1883	1st term	
266	Bishop W. Perkins	R	KS	March 4, 1883	1st term	
267	Samuel R. Peters	R	KS	March 4, 1883	1st term	
268	William Walter Phelps	R	NJ-05	March 4, 1883; Previous service, 1873–1875.	2nd term*	
269	Rice Alexander Pierce	D	TN-09	March 4, 1883	1st term	Left the House in 1885.
270	Luke P. Poland	R	VT-02	March 4, 1883; Previous service, 1867–1875.	5th term*	Left the House in 1885.
271	Walter F. Pool	R	NC-01	March 4, 1883	1st term	Died on August 25, 1883.
272	George Adams Post	D	PA-15	March 4, 1883	1st term	Left the House in 1885.
273	Orlando B. Potter	D	NY-11	March 4, 1883	1st term	Left the House in 1885.
274	William T. Price	R	WI-08	March 4, 1883	1st term	
275	Luke Pryor	D	AL-08	March 4, 1883	1st term	Left the House in 1885.
276	William Henry Mills Pusey	D	IA-09	March 4, 1883	1st term	Left the House in 1885.
277	Joseph Rankin	D	WI-05	March 4, 1883	1st term	
278	George W. Ray	R	NY-21	March 4, 1883	1st term	Left the House in 1885.
279	James M. Riggs	D	IL-12	March 4, 1883	1st term	
280	Thomas A. Robertson	D	KY-04	March 4, 1883	1st term	
281	John H. Rogers	D	AR-03	March 4, 1883	1st term	
282	William Findlay Rogers	D	NY-32	March 4, 1883	1st term	Left the House in 1885.
283	Jonathan H. Rowell	R	IL-14	March 4, 1883	1st term	
284	George E. Seney	D	OH-05	March 4, 1883	1st term	
285	Edward Woodruff Seymour	D	CT-04	March 4, 1883	1st term	
286	Aaron Shaw	D	IL-16	March 4, 1883; Previous service, 1857–1859.	2nd term*	Left the House in 1885.
287	Henry Warner Slocum	D	NY	March 4, 1883; Previous service, 1869–1873.	3rd term*	Left the House in 1885.
288	John T. Spriggs	D	NY-23	March 4, 1883	1st term	
289	Isaac Stephenson	R	WI-09	March 4, 1883	1st term	
290	Robert S. Stevens	D	NY-31	March 4, 1883	1st term	Left the House in 1885.
291	Charles Stewart	D	TX-01	March 4, 1883	1st term	
292	John Wolcott Stewart	R	VT-01	March 4, 1883	1st term	
293	John Brutzman Storm	D	PA-11	March 4, 1883; Previous service, 1871–1875.	3rd term*	
294	Isaac S. Struble	R	IA-11	March 4, 1883	1st term	
295	Charles A. Sumner	D	CA	March 4, 1883	1st term	Left the House in 1885.
296	Daniel H. Sumner	D	WI-02	March 4, 1883	1st term	Left the House in 1885.
297	John May Taylor	D	TN-08	March 4, 1883	1st term	
298	James W. Throckmorton	D	TX-05	March 4, 1883; Previous service, 1875–1879.	3rd term*	
299	George D. Tillman	D	SC-02	March 4, 1883; Previous service, 1879–1882.	3rd term*	
300	Pleasant B. Tully	D	CA-04	March 4, 1883	1st term	Left the House in 1885.
301	Thomas J. Van Alstyne	D	NY-16	March 4, 1883	1st term	Left the House in 1885.
302	Henry Smith Van Eaton	D	MS-06	March 4, 1883	1st term	
303	James Wakefield	R	MN-02	March 4, 1883	1st term	
304	Thomas B. Ward	D	IN-09	March 4, 1883	1st term	
305	Adoniram J. Warner	D	OH-17	March 4, 1883; Previous service, 1879–1881.	2nd term*	
306	Archibald J. Weaver	R	NE-01	March 4, 1883	1st term	
307	Luman H. Weller	R	IA-04	March 4, 1883	1st term	Left the House in 1885.
308	Edward Wemple	D	NY-20	March 4, 1883	1st term	Left the House in 1885.
309	Milo White	R	MN-01	March 4, 1883	1st term	
310	William Whiting II	R	MA-11	March 4, 1883	1st term	
311	Beriah Wilkins	D	OH-16	March 4, 1883	1st term	
312	James Wilson	R	IA-05	March 4, 1883; Previous service, 1873–1877.	3rd term*	Resigned on March 3, 1885.
313	William Lyne Wilson	D	WV-02	March 4, 1883	1st term	
314	Edwin B. Winans	D	MI-06	March 4, 1883	1st term	
315	John Winans	D	WI-01	March 4, 1883	1st term	Left the House in 1885.
316	John Sergeant Wise	R	VA	March 4, 1883	1st term	Left the House in 1885.
317	Frank Lane Wolford	D	KY-11	March 4, 1883	1st term	
318	Thomas Jefferson Wood	D	IN-10	March 4, 1883	1st term	Left the House in 1885.
319	Gilbert M. Woodward	D	WI-07	March 4, 1883	1st term	Left the House in 1885.
320	Nicholas E. Worthington	D	IL-10	March 4, 1883	1st term	
321	George L. Yaple	D	MI-04	March 4, 1883	1st term	Left the House in 1885.
322	Tyre York	D	NC-07	March 4, 1883	1st term	Left the House in 1885.
323	H. Casey Young	D	TN-10	March 4, 1883; Previous service, 1875–1881.	4th term*	Left the House in 1885.
	Charles P. Snyder	D	WV-03	May 15, 1883	1st term	
	John C. Cook	D	IA-06	October 9, 1883; Previous service, 1883.	2nd term*	Left the House in 1885.
	Thomas Gregory Skinner	D	NC-01	November 20, 1883	1st term	
	James T. Jones	D	AL-01	December 3, 1883; Previous service, 1877–1879.	2nd term*	
	Francis W. Rockwell	R	MA-12	January 17, 1884	1st term	
	Robert Smalls	R	SC-07	March 18, 1884; Previous service, 1875–1879 and 1882–1883.	4th term**	
	George Tankard Garrison	D	VA-01	March 20, 1884; Previous service, 1881–1883.	2nd term*	Left the House in 1885.
	Edward H. Funston	R	KS-02	March 21, 1884	1st term	
	Charles Triplett O'Ferrall	D	VA-07	May 5, 1884	1st term	
	William E. English	D	IN-07	May 22, 1884	1st term	Left the House in 1885.
	Jonathan H. Wallace	D	OH-18	May 27, 1884	1st term	Left the House in 1885.
	James E. Campbell	D	OH-07	June 20, 1884	1st term	
	James R. Chalmers	R	MS-02	June 25, 1884; Previous service, 1877–1882.	4th term*	Left the House in 1885.
	Benjamin F. Shively	D	IN-13	December 1, 1884	1st term	Left the House in 1885.
	Hiram Y. Smith	D	IA-07	December 2, 1884	1st term	Left the House in 1885.
	John Bratton	D	SC-04	December 8, 1884	1st term	Left the House in 1885.
	John A. Swope	D	PA-19	December 23, 1884	1st term	Left the House in 1885.
	George Henry Craig	R	AL-04	January 9, 1885	1st term	Left the House in 1885.
	James W. Reid	R	NC-05	January 28, 1885	1st term	
	Nathan F. Dixon III	R	RI-02	February 12, 1885	1st term	Left the House in 1885.

== Delegates ==
Rank	Delegate	Party	District	Seniority date (Previous service, if any)	No.# of term(s)	Notes
1	Martin Maginnis	D	MT	March 4, 1873	6th term	
2	Thomas Hurley Brents	R	WA	March 4, 1879	3rd term	
3	Tranquilino Luna	R	NM	March 4, 1881	2nd term	
4	Granville Henderson Oury	D	AZ	March 4, 1881	2nd term	
5	Morton Everel Post	D	WY	March 4, 1881	2nd term	
6	John Thomas Caine	D	UT	November 7, 1882	2nd term	
7	John B. Raymond	R	DAK	March 4, 1883	1st term	
8	Theodore F. Singiser	R	ID	March 4, 1883	1st term	
	Francisco Antonio Manzanares	D	NM	March 5, 1884	1st term	

== See also ==
- 48th United States Congress
- List of United States congressional districts
- List of United States senators in the 48th Congress
