= Charles Raymond =

Charles Raymond may refer to:

- Charles Raymond, 1st Baronet (1713–1788), British merchant and aristocrat
- Charles Raymond (director) (1858–1930), British actor and film director
- Charles W. Raymond (1842–1913), American civil engineer and general
- Charles W. Raymond (judge) (1858–1939), American judge
- Charles Marie Raymond, 5th Duke of Arenberg (1721–1778), Austrian field marshal
- Charles Raymond (EastEnders), character in the British soap opera EastEnders
