= Samuel Morton Rutherford (Oklahoma politician) =

American politician (1859–1922)

Member of the Oklahoma Senate from the 27th district
- In office November 16, 1920 – December 16, 1922
- Preceded by: Eugene M. Kerr
- Succeeded by: Clark Nichols

U.S. Marshal for the Indian Territory's Northern district
- In office March 20, 1895 – December 12, 1895
- Preceded by: J. J. McAlester (Note: As U.S. Marshall for Indian Territory before the creation of districts.)
- Succeeded by: Leo E. Bennett

Personal details
- Born: February 16, 1859 Lewisville, Arkansas, U.S.
- Died: December 16, 1922 (aged 63) Muskogee, Oklahoma, U.S.
- Cause of death: automobile accident
- Children: Samuel Morton Rutherford Jr.
- Relatives: William Butler (grandfather); Samuel Morton Rutherford (grandfather)

Samuel Morton Rutherford (February 16, 1859 – December 16, 1922) was an American politician who served in the Oklahoma Senate, as Mayor of Muskogee, Oklahoma, and as an U.S. Marshall for the Indian Territory.

== Early life and family ==
Samuel Morton Rutherford was born to Robert B. Rutherford and Sallie Wallace Butler on February 16, 1859, in Lewisville, Arkansas. His maternal grandfather was William Butler, a U.S. Congressman, and he was related to Matthew C. Perry, Oliver Hazard Perry, Matthew Butler, and Pierce Mason Butler on his maternal side. His paternal grandfather was also named Samuel Morton Rutherford and served in the Arkansas Legislature. During the American Civil War his father served in the Confederate States Army.

Rutherford started school in 1865, after the end of the Civil War. He attended Cane Hill College and Henry University, graduating from the later in 1883 as valedictorian and pursuing a career in law.

== Indian Territory ==
In 1893, Rutherford was appointed the United States Commissioner for Indian Territory and he was appointed the U.S. Marshal for the territory on March 20, 1895. He led the capture of the Rufus Buck Gang and prevented their lynching on August 11, 1895, but the men were later executed by hanging on the order of Judge Isaac Parker. He left office on December 12, 1895.

In 1898, he started a law firm with Charles Bingley Stuart, James H. Gordon, and Yancey Lewis. On April 16, 1890, he married Sarah Rebecca Dillard, who went by Sallie. In 1903, he was elected Mayor of Muskogee, Indian Territory. Rutherford led the development of water infrastructure, paved roads, and a street railway system. In August 1905, he was a delegate to the State of Sequoyah constitutional convention. He was also a delegate to the Democratic National Convention in 1900, 1904, and 1916. He ran for the United States Senate in 1907, losing the Democratic nomination to Robert L. Owen. He ran for the Oklahoma Senate and was elected in 1921 and served until his death.

== Death ==
On December 16, 1922, Rutherford attended a Muskogee Bar Association banquet honoring Fred P. Branson and another attorney unintentionally hit him with his automobile after the event and killed him. His son, Samuel Morton Rutherford Jr., also served in the Oklahoma Senate.

== Works cited ==
- Rand, Jerry (Summer 1952). "Samuel Morton Rutherford" (PDF). Chronicles of Oklahoma. 30 (2): 149–159.
- Williams, Robert L. (1942). "Arthur John Cline, 1865-1942" (PDF). Chronicles of Oklahoma. 20 (3): 241–243.
