= Constantine B. Kilgore =

American politician (1835–1897)

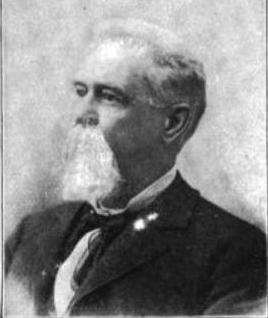

Judge for the Southern District of the United States Court for the Indian Territory
- In office March 20, 1895 – September 23, 1897
- Appointed by: Grover Cleveland
- Preceded by: Position established
- Succeeded by: Hosea Townsend

Member of the U.S. House of Representatives from Texas's 3rd district
- In office March 4, 1887 – March 3, 1895
- Preceded by: James H. Jones
- Succeeded by: C. H. Yoakum

President pro tempore of the Texas Senate
- In office 1885–1886
- Preceded by: William Russell Shannon
- Succeeded by: William Henry Pope

Member of the Texas Senate
- In office 1884–1886

Personal details
- Born: Constantine Buckley Kilgore; February 20, 1835 Newnan, Georgia, U.S.
- Died: September 23, 1897 (aged 62) Ardmore, Indian Territory, U.S.
- Resting place: White Rose Cemetery; Wills Point, Texas, U.S.
- Party: Democratic
- Military career
- Allegiance: Confederate States of America
- Branch: Confederate States Army
- Rank: Adjutant general
- Unit: Army of the Tennessee
- Conflicts: American Civil War

Constantine Buckley Kilgore (February 20, 1835 – September 23, 1897) was a U.S. Representative from Texas.

== Early life and Confederate Army service ==
Constantine Buckley "Buck" Kilgore was born on February 20, 1835, in Newnan, Georgia. In 1846, his family moved to Rusk County, Texas, where Kilgore attended school. He also studied law, was admitted to the bar, and practiced in Rusk County, Texas. During the Civil War, Kilgore entered the Confederate States Army as a private and by 1862 attained the rank of adjutant general of Matthew Ector's brigade in the Army of the Tennessee. During the war he was wounded during the Battle of Chickamauga and was captured. He was a prisoner of war for the rest of the war.

== Political career ==
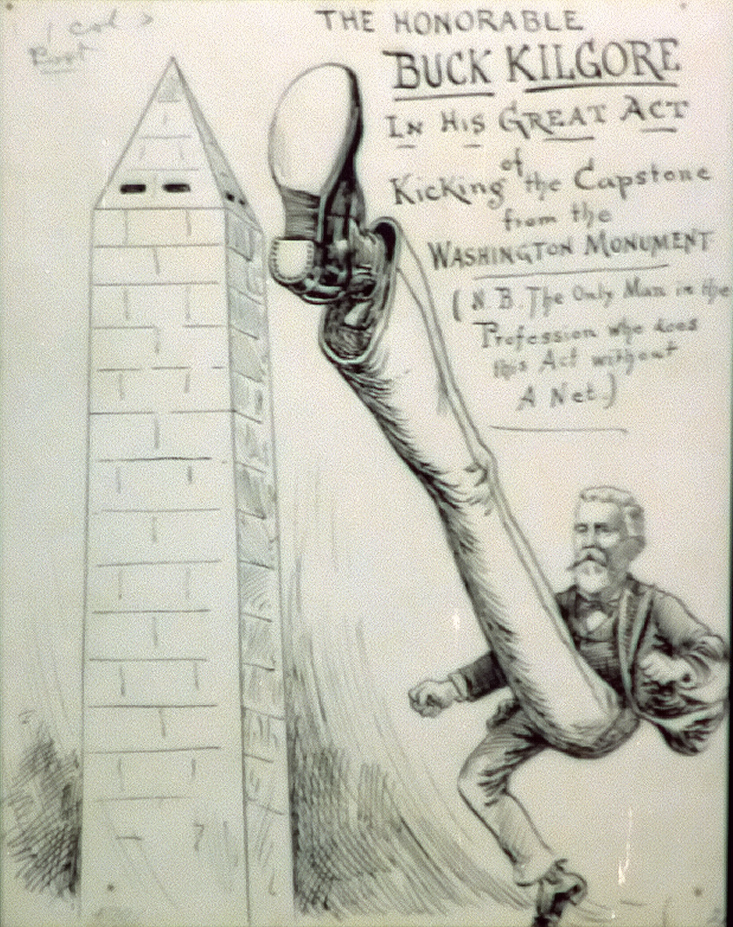
A political cartoon of Constantine Buckley Kilgore nicknamed Buck Kilgore

Kilgore was elected Justice of the Peace in 1869. In 1872 the city of Kilgore, Texas was named in his honor after the International–Great Northern Railroad acquired land for a depot. He served as a member of the Texas Constitutional convention in 1875 and was elected to the Texas Senate in 1884 for a term of four years. He was voted president of that body in 1885 for two years. He resigned from the State senate in 1886 after winning an election to Congress.

Kilgore was elected as a Democrat to the Fiftieth and to the three succeeding Congresses (March 4, 1887 – March 3, 1895). When House Speaker Thomas Brackett Reed attempted to end the "silent filibuster" in 1890, a process by which the minority party could stop House business by calling quorums but then not answering when their names were called, Reed ended the process by directing the House Clerk to record those not answering to their names when the roll was called as present but not voting. Kilgore famously attempted to avoid being counted by kicking through a locked door to escape the House chamber.

In 1895, President Grover Cleveland appointed Kilgore judge for the southern district of the United States Court for the Indian Territory. He served from March 20, 1895 until his death in Ardmore, Indian Territory (now Oklahoma) on September 23, 1897. Kilgore was interred at White Rose Cemetery, Wills Point, Texas.

U.S. House of Representatives
Preceded by James H. Jones	Member of the U.S. House of Representatives from Texas's 3rd congressional district 1887–1895	Succeeded by Charles H. Yoakum
