= William Ridgway Lawrence =

Judge for the Northern District of the United States Court for the Indian Territory
- In office 1904 – November 16, 1907
- Appointed by: Theodore Roosevelt
- Preceded by: Position established
- Succeeded by: Position disestablished

Personal details
- Born: January 14, 1840 Bloomington, Indiana, U.S.
- Died: July 31, 1923 (aged 83) Okmulgee, Oklahoma, U.S.
- Resting place: Fort Gibson, Oklahoma, U.S.
- Party: Republican

William Ridgway Lawrence (January 14, 1840 – July 31, 1923) was an American judge who served on the United States Court for the Indian Territory between 1904 and Oklahoma statehood on November 16, 1907.

== Biography ==
William Ridgway Lawrence was born on January 14, 1840, to John and Eliza Lawrence in Bloomington, Indiana. The family soon moved to Illinois.

Lawrence joined the Union Army during the American Civil War, serving as a lieutenant in the 73rd Illinois Infantry Regiment. He was captured at the Battle of Chickamauga and spent the rest of the war as a prisoner of war at Libby Prison.

After the war he returned to Bloomington and read the law. He married Josephine Frazier in 1867 and was active in Republican politics. He represented U.S. Speaker of the House Joseph G. Cannon. In 1904, he was appointed by Theodore Roosevelt to the Northern District of the United States Court for the Indian Territory. After statehood, he opened a law practice in Muskogee, Oklahoma.

He died on July 31, 1923, in Okmulgee, and is buried at Fort Gibson.
