= United States Court for the Indian Territory =

Federal Court of the United States in Indian Territory between 1889 and 1907

The United States Court for the Indian Territory was a Federal Court of the United States in Indian Territory between 1889 and November 16, 1907, the day Oklahoma was admitted as a U.S. state.

== History ==
In 1889, the United States Congress created a federal court with jurisdiction over Indian Territory. The court heard criminal cases not punishable by death or hard labor and civil cases were a U.S. citizen was party. In 1891, the Judiciary Act of 1891 made the appellate court for Indian Territory the 8th Circuit Court of Appeals. The courts were abolished with Oklahoma statehood on November 16, 1907.

== Judges ==
Originally, the court had one judge, but in 1895 the court was divided into a northern, central, and southern district. James M. Shackelford was appointed by President Benjamin Harrison as the first judge of the court in 1889. Charles Bingley Stuart was appointed by President Grover Cleveland to replace Shackelford on March 27, 1893. When the court was divided into a northern, central, and southern district in 1895, Stewart became the judge for the central district. In December 1895, Shackelford resigned and President Cleveland appointed Yancey Lewis to the bench. In 1897, Lewis was replaced with William Henry Harrison Clayton by President William McKinley.

In 1895, Constantine B. Kilgore was appointed to the southern district and William McKendree Springer was appointed to the northern district. In 1899, Springer left office and President William McKinley appointed Joseph A. Gill as his replacement. Kilgore was the only judge of the court to die in office on September 23, 1897. On October 4, 1897, Hosea Townsend was appointed his replacement by President McKinley.

In 1895, Springer became the first chief justice of the court. In 1897, John Robert Thomas was appointed as the a "roving judge" to hear cases in all three district in Indian Territory. Thomas' term expired in 1901 and he was replaced by Charles W. Raymond. In 1902, a western district was created and Raymond served as its first judge. In 1904, William Ridgway Lawrence was appointed to the northern district, Thomas Chauncey Humphry was appointed to the central district, Joseph Thomas Dickerson was appointed to the southern district, and Louis Sulzbacher was appointed in the western district.

=== List of Judges ===
Court for the Indian Territory (1889–1895)

- James M. Shackelford (1889–1893)
- Charles Bingley Stuart (1893–1895)

Roving Judge (1897–1902)

- John Robert Thomas (1897–1901)
- Charles W. Raymond (1901–1902)

Central District (1895–1907)

- Charles Bingley Stuart (1895)
- William Yancey Lewis (1895–1897)
- William Henry Harrison Clayton (1897–1907)
- Thomas Chauncey Humphry (1904–1907)

Southern District (1895–1907)

- Constantine B. Kilgore, died in office (1895–1897)
- Hosea Townsend (1897–1907)
- Joseph Dickerson (1904–1907)

Northern District (1895–1907)

- William McKendree Springer (1895–1899)
- Joseph A. Gill (1899–1907)
- William Ridgway Lawrence (1904–1907)

Western District (1902–1907)

- Charles W. Raymond (1902–1907)
- Louis Sulzbacher (1904–1907)
