= John C. Colquitt =

American politician

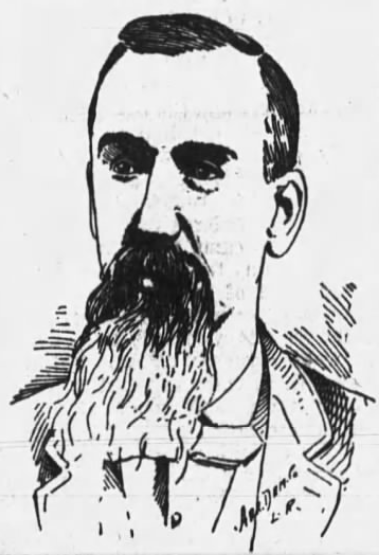

Member of the Arkansas House of Representatives
- In office 1885–1888; 1893–1897

Speaker of the Arkansas House of Representatives
- In office 1895–1897
- Preceded by: T. C. Humphrey
- Succeeded by: James Camp Tappan

Personal details
- Born: John Chesley Colquitt; July 14, 1846 Georgia, United States
- Died: May 12, 1913 (aged 66) Magnolia, Arkansas
- Party: Democratic

John Chesley Colquitt (July 14, 1846 – May 12, 1913) was an American politician. He was a member of the Arkansas House of Representatives, serving from 1885 to 1888 and from 1893 to 1897. He was a member of the Democratic party. He died at his home in Magnolia, Arkansas on May 12, 1913.
