= Tignal W. Jones =

American military officer and lawyer (1820–1882)

- Born: November 25, 1820; Louisburg, North Carolina, US
- Died: June 18, 1882 (aged 61); Dallas, Texas, US
- Military career
- Allegiance: United States (1846–1848); Confederate States of America (1861–1865)
- Branch: United States Army (Mexican War); Confederate States Army (Civil War)
- Service years: 1846; 1861–1863
- Rank: Colonel
- Commands: 1st Alabama Volunteer Infantry Unit (Mexican War); 1st Texas Cavalry Regiment (Civil War)
- Conflicts: Mexican–American War; Siege of Veracruz; Battle for Mexico City; American Civil War

Tignal W. Jones (November 25, 1820 – June 18, 1882) was an American military officer and lawyer. He served in the Mexican–American War and the American Civil War, the latter as a Confederate. He attained the rank of colonel.

== Early life and education ==
Jones was born on November 25, 1820, near Louisburg, North Carolina, the son of Willis H. Jones and Mary H. (née Taylor) Jones. He was of English and Welsh descent. His brother was politician James H. Jones. His great-grandfather, also named Tignal Jones, was a signatory of the Constitution of North Carolina.

Jones attended common schools. In 1841, he matriculated at the University of Nashville, being taught by Philip Lindsley. After graduating, he read law in Tuskegee, Alabama, under William Parish Chilton and Franklin W. Bowdon, then under John T. Morgan.

== Career and military service ==
In 1844, Jones was admitted to the bar, after which he partnered with Bowdon. The partnership ceased at the onset of the Mexican–American War, resuming in 1847, after Jones returned from the war. He owned ten or 12 slaves.

During the war, Jones served as first lieutenant of Company E, of the 1st Alabama Volunteer Infantry Unit, from January to December 1846. Under the command of Winfield Scott, he fought a campaign in central Mexico, as well as in the Siege of Veracruz and the Battle for Mexico City. Most of his service was completed in the towns of Camargo and Tampico.

In 1848, Jones formed a partnership in Talladega, with a man named Bowie and Jabez L. M. Curry. In 1856, he moved to Tyler, Texas, practicing law there. He was a Democrat. In March 1861, he was elected to the Texas secession convention, where he voted in support of secession. He fought for two years in the American Civil War. On March 25, 1861, he enlisted as a private in the Confederate States Army. He later became colonel of the 1st Texas Cavalry Regiment. The unit saw little action due to being disorderly. After the war, he joined the Knights of the Golden Circle.

After the war, Jones returned to practicing law in Tyler. In 1872, he partnered with J. L. Henry, and in 1879, moved to Dallas, where he practiced alone. He owned land in Anderson and Harrison Counties. He had previously owned more property, though lost it by selling it for Confederate States dollars.

== Personal life and death ==
In 1854, Jones married Mary E. Barclay, who died six months afterward. On December 18, 1856, he married Martha Marsh Bell, with whom he had two children, with one daughter surviving infancy. He was a Baptist and a member of the Freemasons. He died on June 18, 1882, aged 61, in Dallas, from illness. He was buried on June 20, at Oakwood Cemetery, in Tyler.
