= Joseph A. Gill =

American lawyer (1854–1933)

Judge for the Northern District of the United States Court for the Indian Territory
- In office 1899 – November 16, 1907
- Appointed by: William McKinley
- Preceded by: William McKendree Springer
- Succeeded by: Position disestablished

Personal details
- Born: Joseph Albert Gill; February 17, 1854 Wheeling, Virginia, U.S.
- Died: March 23, 1933 (aged 79) Tulsa, Oklahoma, U.S.

Joseph A. Gill (1854 – 1933) was an American federal judge.

A native of what is now Wheeling West Virginia and a graduate of the University of Illinois, Gill moved about in the western U.S., practicing law, and even editing newspapers. He settled in Kansas where he practiced law and became active in Republican party politics. A vigorous supporter of William McKinley for president in 1896, he was rewarded with an appointment as United States Judge for the Northern District of the Indian Territory in 1899. President Theodore Roosevelt reappointed him to serve in the same position from 1903 to 1907.

== Early life ==
Joseph Albert Gill was born in Wheeling, Virginia (now Wheeling, West Virginia) on February 17, 1854, to John and Rhoda Gill. The family moved to Springfield, Illinois when Joseph was ten years old. He attended the University of Illinois, read law in the offices of John A. McClernand and Charles Keyes. After practicing for three years in Springfield, he moved to Portland, Oregon. During the next few years, he moved around the northwest, practicing law in Astoria, Oregon and editing a newspaper in Oysterville, Washington. (Note: The newspaper was named the Pacific Journal.) He came back east in 1887, and settled in Colby, Kansas to open his law office.

== Political life ==
Gill quickly became a Republican Party stalwart in Kansas. (Note: Gill's son called him an"uncompromising" Republican.) He practiced law and again edited a local newspaper, a weekly named the Thomas County Cat. He was a delegate to the June 1896 Republican Convention, where his friend, William McKinley became the party candidate for president. Gill spent much time and energy stumping the state for McKinley and the other party nominees. McKinley was elected president.

== Legal career in Indian Territory ==
In December, 1899, he appointed Gill as United States Judge for the Northern District of the Indian Territory, which was located in Muskogee. On December 29, 1899, the new judge opened his first court appearance, replacing the retiring Judge, William M. Springer. Judge Gill found that he was also responsible for court cases in other Indian Territory Northern District "court towns," which were: Tahlequah, Sallisaw, Wagoner, Pryor Creek, Vinita, Miami, Nowata, Bartlesville and Claremore. He also covered Wewoka and Okmulgee, until a separate district was created for them. Moreover, he was by law, a member of the four-member Indian Territory Court of Appeals. (Note: This court met twice a year in McAlester to resolve cases that had been appealed from lower courts.)

Judge Gill was reappointed to another term by President Theodore Roosevelt. He was also appointed, along with Judge W. H. H. Clayton and Tams Bixby, to set up the machinery for electing delegates to the Constitutional Convention. (Note: Tams Bixby was formerly a chairman of the Dawes Commission.) This group of three men was also charged with subdividing the whole of Indian Territory into districts and precincts. Outside of incorporated cities, that had never before been done in Indian Territory.

== After statehood ==
When Oklahoma became a state on November 16, 1907, Gill's position as a judge ceased to exist. He and his family moved to Vinita, where he became a member of the Vinita Board of Education, a delegate to the National Conference of Charities at St. Louis in 1910 and a delegate to the 1912 Republican National Convention in Chicago. The family moved to Tulsa in 1920, where Joseph practiced law and got involved with civic, public, religious and political affairs. A member of the Baptist church, he was also a 32nd degree Mason and a member of the Knights of Pythias.

== Personal life and death ==
Joseph Gill married Miss Nannie Donahue, a daughter of Hon. M. Donahue of Clinton, Illinois, on December 27, 1887, in Omaha, Nebraska. They had three children: Mrs. R. M, McClintock of Oklahoma City, Mrs. C. A. Border of Tulsa and Joseph A. Gill Jr., a practicing attorney at Tulsa, Oklahoma.

Judge Joseph Gill died in Tulsa on March 23, 1933. He was buried in Tulsa's Memorial Park Cemetery.
