= Hosea Townsend =

American politician (1840–1909)

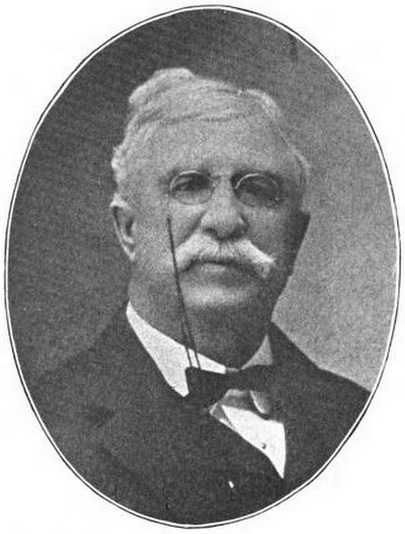

Judge for the Southern District of the United States Court for the Indian Territory
- In office 1897 – November 16, 1907
- Appointed by: William McKinley; Theodore Roosevelt
- Preceded by: Constantine B. Kilgore
- Succeeded by: Position disestablished

Member of the U.S. House of Representatives from Colorado's at-large district
- In office March 4, 1889 – March 3, 1893
- Preceded by: George G. Symes
- Succeeded by: District inactive

Member of the Tennessee House of Representatives
- In office 1869–1871

Personal details
- Born: June 16, 1840 Greenwich, Ohio, U.S.
- Died: March 4, 1909 (aged 68) Ardmore, Oklahoma, U.S.
- Resting place: Woodlawn Cemetery, Norwalk, Ohio

Military service
- Allegiance: United States

Hosea Townsend (June 16, 1840 – March 4, 1909) was an American attorney and politician who served two terms as a U.S. representative from Colorado from 1889 to 1893.

Appointed by Presidents McKinley and Roosevelt, he was a United States judge for the southern district of the Indian Territory from 1897 to 1907.

== Early life and education ==
Born on a farm in Greenwich, Ohio, his parents were Hiram and Eliza Townsend. His father came to New London, Ohio from Massachusetts in 1816. Townsend attended the common schools and Western Reserve College, Cleveland, Ohio, in 1860.

== Civil War ==
He was a student at the Western Reserve College at the outbreak of the American Civil War. He enlisted in the Second Regiment, Ohio Volunteer Cavalry, in 1861. He was promoted to lieutenant. He was stationed at Fort Gibson in Indian Territory during part of the war. He contracted a case of typhoid fever and resigned in 1863 due to a disability.

== Career ==
He studied law and was admitted to the bar in Cleveland, Ohio, in 1864 or 1865. He began practicing law in Memphis, Tennessee in 1865. He served as member of the Tennessee House of Representatives representing Shelby County, Tennessee from 1869 to 1871. He practiced law in Memphis until 1881.

He moved to Colorado in 1879 and settled in Silver Cliff in 1881. He made and lost a fortune in the mining business.

=== Congress ===
Townsend was elected as a Republican to the Fifty-first and Fifty-second Congresses (March 4, 1889 – March 3, 1893). He was an unsuccessful candidate for renomination in 1892.

=== Later career ===
He served as delegate to the Republican National Convention in 1892. He was a United States judge for the southern district of the Indian Territory from 1897 to 1907. He served on the Court of Appeals. He was first appointed by President William McKinley and he was re-appointed by President Theodore Roosevelt in 1902 and 1906. Oklahoma achieved statehood in 1907 and the Indian Territory court was closed. He remained in Ardmore and practiced law.

Townsend had a forceful personality. In one case, a Seventh Day Adventist refused to perform jury duty on a Sunday, and Townsend found him in contempt of court. He discharged a jury that returned a verdict with which he disagreed saying it was "discharged for the term, and I never want to see any of you in my court again." Yet he extended leniency to a bootlegger whose family needed him at home to keep food on the table.

— Von Russell Creel

== Personal life ==
He married Anna Augusta Barnes on November 28, 1865 and they had two children, John Barnes Townsend and Anna Bell Townsend. After they moved to Ardmore, Oklahoma of the Indian Territory, Anna decided that the area needed a library and obtained funding from Andrew Carnegie about 1903. The Ardmore Carnegie Library was opened on October 1, 1906. Anna and Hosea donated 800 books for the library.

== Death and burial ==
He died in Ardmore, Oklahoma on March 4, 1909. He was interred in Woodlawn Cemetery, Norwalk, Ohio. Anna died in 1915.

U.S. House of Representatives
Preceded by George G. Symes	Member of the U.S. House of Representatives from Colorado's at-large congressional district 1889–1893	Succeeded by District inactive
