= Ardmore Carnegie Library =

- U.S. National Register of Historic Places
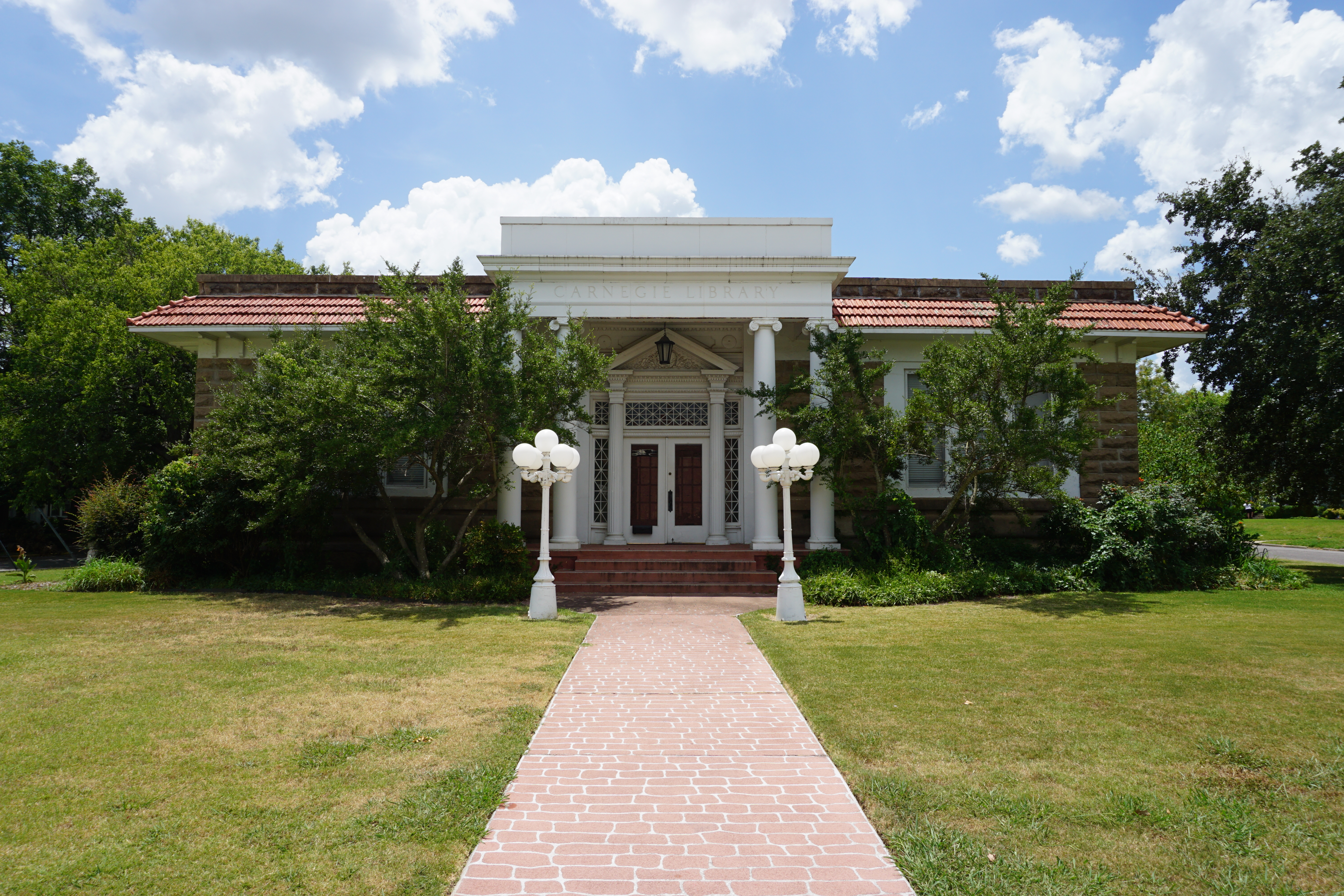

- Location within Oklahoma Location within the United States
- Location: 511 Stanley SW., Ardmore, Oklahoma
- Coordinates: 34°10′14″N 97°8′7″W
- Area: less than one acre
- Built: 1905
- Architect: Smith, S. Wemyss
- Architectural style: Classical Revival, Bungalow/craftsman
- NRHP reference No.: 00000620
- Added to NRHP: June 2, 2000

The Ardmore Carnegie Library, at 511 Stanley SW. in Ardmore, Oklahoma, is a Carnegie library built in 1905. It was listed on the National Register of Historic Places in 2000. It has also been known as the Ardmore Garden Clubs Building.

The idea for a library in Ardmore began with Anna Barnes Townsend, wife of Judge Hosea Townsend for the southern district of the Indian Territory. After the Townsends moved to Ardmore, Anna obtained funding from Andrew Carnegie about 1903 and the Ardmore Carnegie Library was opened on October 1, 1906. The Townsends donated 800 books for the library.

It was designed by Fort Worth architect S. Wemyss Smith. It is 60 by 54 feet (18 m × 16 m) in plan. It is built with post-and-beam structural support and has load-bearing walls built of 18 by 8.5 inches (0.46 m × 0.22 m) cast-stone blocks.

The building was modified in 1926 with removal of its original roof and second floor, and again in 1941 with addition of a new wing. The resulting building is a mix of Classical Revival and Craftsman styles.
