= Samuel Morton Rutherford Jr. =

American politician, judge (1894–1978)

Member of the Oklahoma Senate from the 31st district
- In office November 16, 1930 – November 16, 1934
- Preceded by: C. H. Terwilleger
- Succeeded by: Henry C. Timmons

Tulsa County Judge
- In office 1927–1931

Personal details
- Born: October 22, 1894 Atoka, Choctaw Nation, Indian Territory
- Died: May 26, 1978 (aged 83) Tulsa, Oklahoma, U.S.
- Party: Democratic Party
- Parent: Samuel Morton Rutherford (father)

Samuel Morton Rutherford Jr. was an American judge and politician who served in the Oklahoma Senate. He was the son of Samuel Morton Rutherford and the great-grandson of Samuel Morton Rutherford.

== Biography ==
Samuel Morton Rutherford Jr. was born in Atoka, Indian Territory on October 22, 1894. He attended the University of Oklahoma and Cumberland University. He served in the United States Army during World War I. He served as Judge of the Common Pleas Court of Tulsa County from 1927 to 1931 and served in the Oklahoma Senate from 1931 to 1934. He was the attorney for the Oklahoma Home Owners' Loan Association between 1934 and 1938. He had two children. He died on May 26, 1978, in Tulsa.

== Works cited ==
- Rand, Jerry (Summer 1952). "Samuel Morton Rutherford" (PDF). Chronicles of Oklahoma. 30 (2): 149–159.
