= List of United States senators in the 48th Congress =

This is a complete list of United States senators during the 48th United States Congress listed by seniority from March 4, 1883, to March 3, 1885.

Order of service is based on the commencement of the senator's first term. Behind this is former service as a senator (only giving the senator seniority within their new incoming class), service as vice president, a House member, a cabinet secretary, or a governor of a state. The final factor is the population of the senator's state.

Senators who were sworn in during the middle of the Congress (up until the last senator who was not sworn in early after winning the November 1884 election) are listed at the end of the list with no number.

== Terms of service ==
Class	Terms of service of senators that expired in years
Class 3	Terms of service of senators that expired in 1885 (AL, AR, CA, CO, CT, FL, GA, IA, IL, IN, KS, KY, LA, MD, MO, NC, NH, NV, NY, ND, OH, OR, PA, SC, SD, VT, and WI.)
Class 1	Terms of service of senators that expired in 1887 (CA, CT, DE, FL, IN, MA, MD, ME, MI, MN, MO, MS, NE, NJ, NV, NY, OH, PA, RI, TN, TX, VA, VT, WI, and WV)
Class 2	Terms of service of senators that expired in 1889 (AL, AR, CO, DE, GA, IA, IL, KS, KY, LA, MA, ME, MI, MN, MS, NC, NE, NH, NJ, OR, RI, SC, TN, TX, VA, and WV.)

== U.S. Senate seniority list ==
U.S. Senate seniority
Rank	Senator (party-state)	Seniority date	Other factors
1	Henry B. Anthony (R-RI)	March 4, 1859	Former governor
2	George F. Edmunds (R-VT)	April 3, 1866	
3	Justin Smith Morrill (R-VT)	March 4, 1867	
4	Thomas F. Bayard (D-DE)	March 4, 1869	
5	Eli Saulsbury (D-DE)	March 4, 1871	
6	Matt W. Ransom (D-NC)	January 30, 1872	
7	William B. Allison (R-IA)	March 4, 1873	Former representative
8	John J. Ingalls (R-KS)	March 4, 1873	
9	John P. Jones (R-NV)	March 4, 1873	
10	Francis Cockrell (D-MO)	March 4, 1875	
11	Henry L. Dawes (R-MA)	March 4, 1875	
12	Charles W. Jones (D-FL)	March 4, 1875	
13	Samuel J. R. McMillan (R-MN)	March 4, 1875	
14	Samuel B. Maxey (D-TX)	March 4, 1875	
15	George F. Hoar (R-MA)	March 4, 1877	Former representative
16	Isham G. Harris (D-TN)	March 4, 1877	Former governor
17	John Tyler Morgan (D-AL)	March 4, 1877	
18	John R. McPherson (D-NJ)	March 4, 1877	
19	Matthew Butler (D-SC)	March 4, 1877	
20	Richard Coke (D-TX)	March 4, 1877	
21	Preston B. Plumb (R-KS)	March 4, 1877	
22	James B. Beck (D-KY)	March 4, 1877	
23	Lucius Q. C. Lamar (D-MS)	March 4, 1877	
24	Augustus H. Garland (D-AR)	March 4, 1877	
25	J. Donald Cameron (R-PA)	March 20, 1877	
26	Daniel W. Voorhees (D-IN)	November 6, 1877	
27	George G. Vest (D-MO)	March 4, 1879	Missouri 5th in population (1870)
28	Orville H. Platt (R-CT)	March 4, 1879	Connecticut 25th in population (1870)
29	Wilkinson Call (D-FL)	March 4, 1879	Florida 33rd in population (1870)
30	Zebulon Baird Vance (D-NC)	March 4, 1879	
31	Wade Hampton III (R-SC)	March 4, 1879	
32	John A. Logan (R-IL)	March 4, 1879	
33	James D. Walker (D-AR)	March 4, 1879	
34	James T. Farley (D-CA)	March 4, 1879	
35	Nathaniel P. Hill (R-CO)	March 4, 1879	
36	John S. Williams (R-KY)	March 4, 1879	
37	Benjamin F. Jonas (D-LA)	March 4, 1879	
38	George H. Pendleton (D-OH)	March 4, 1879	Former representative
39	James H. Slater (D-OR)	March 4, 1879	Former representative
40	James B. Groome (D-MD)	March 4, 1879	Former governor
41	Henry W. Blair (R-NH)	June 18, 1879	Former representative
42	Joseph E. Brown (D-GA)	May 26, 1880	
43	James L. Pugh (D-AL)	November 24, 1880	
44	John Sherman (R-OH)	March 4, 1881	Previously a senator
45	Eugene Hale (R-ME)	March 4, 1881	Former representative (10 years)
46	Joseph Hawley (R-CT)	March 4, 1881	Former representative (5 years)
47	James Z. George (D-MS)	March 4, 1881	Mississippi 18th in population (1880)
48	Arthur P. Gorman (D-MD)	March 4, 1881	Maryland 20th in population (1880)
49	Philetus Sawyer (R-WI)	March 4, 1881	
50	Benjamin Harrison (R-IN)	March 4, 1881	
51	Omar D. Conger (R-MI)	March 4, 1881	
52	John F. Miller (R-CA)	March 4, 1881	
53	Charles Van Wyck (R-NE)	March 4, 1881	
54	James G. Fair (D-NV)	March 4, 1881	
55	William J. Sewell (R-NJ)	March 4, 1881	
56	John I. Mitchell (R-PA)	March 4, 1881	
57	William Mahone (RA-VA)	March 4, 1881	
58	Howell E. Jackson (D-TN)	March 4, 1881	
	Angus Cameron (R-WI)	March 14, 1881	
	William P. Frye (R-ME)	March 18, 1881	
	Warner Miller (R-NY)	July 27, 1881	
	Elbridge G. Lapham (R-NY)	August 2, 1881	
	Nelson Aldrich (R-RI)	October 5, 1881	
54	Alfred H. Colquitt (D-GA)	March 4, 1883	
	Shelby Moore Cullom (R-IL)	March 4, 1883	Former governor
	James F. Wilson (R-IA)	March 4, 1883	
	Charles F. Manderson (R-NE)	March 4, 1883	
	Joseph N. Dolph (R-OR)	March 4, 1883	
	Randall L. Gibson (D-LA)	March 4, 1883	
	John E. Kenna (D-WV)	March 4, 1883	
	Thomas M. Bowen (R-CO)	March 4, 1883	
	Thomas W. Palmer (R-MI)	March 4, 1883	
	Dwight M. Sabin (R-MN)	March 4, 1883	
	Harrison H. Riddleberger (RA-VA)	March 4, 1883	
	Austin F. Pike (R-NH)	August 2, 1883	
	William Paine Sheffield, Sr. (R-RI)	November 19, 1884	
	Jonathan Chace (R-RI)	January 20, 1885	

== See also ==
- 48th United States Congress
- List of United States representatives in the 48th Congress
