= James C. Tappan House =

Historic house in Arkansas, United States

- U.S. National Register of Historic Places
- U.S. Historic district – Contributing property
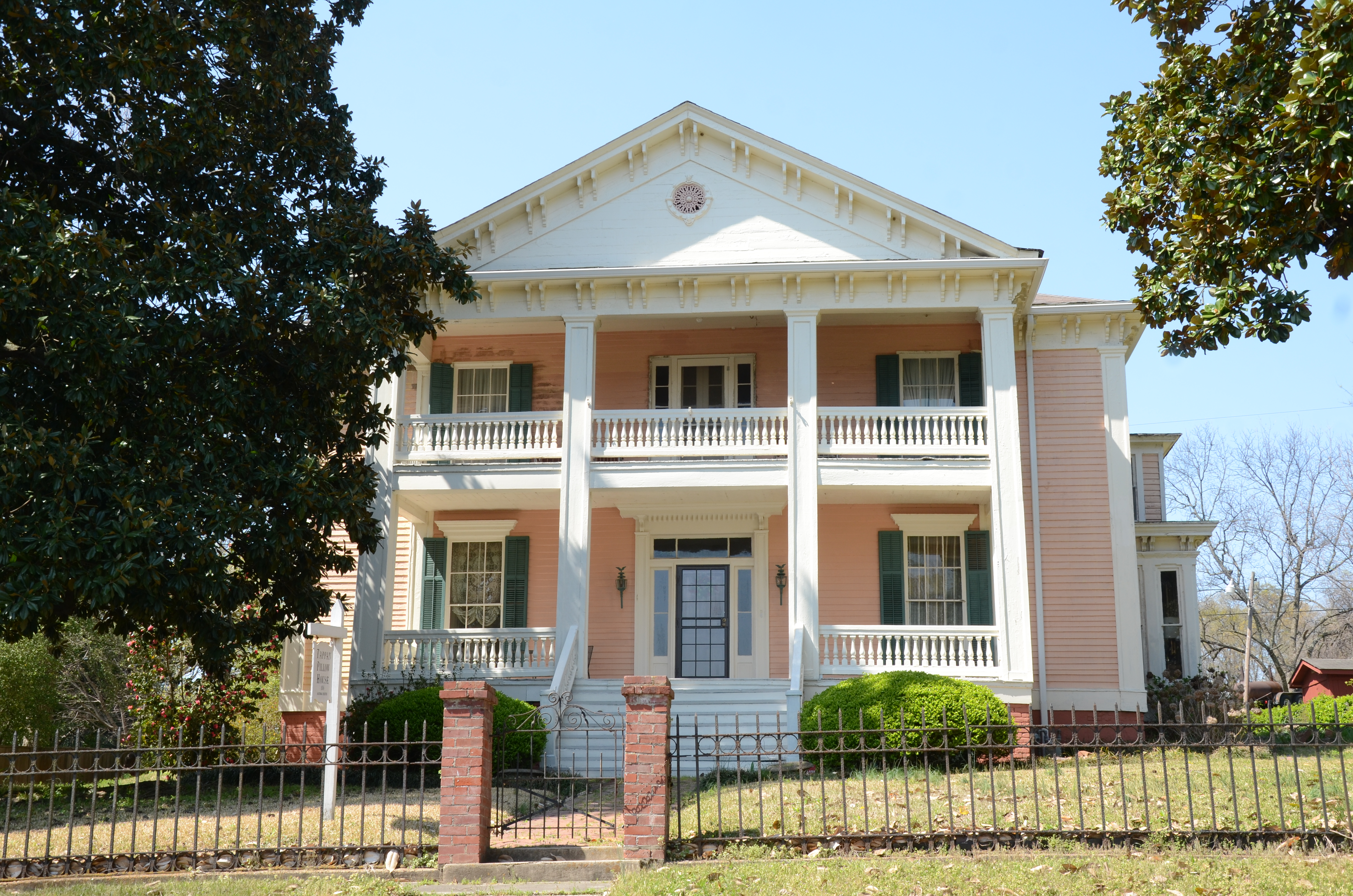
- Main façade of the Tappan House

- Location within Arkansas Location within the United States
- Location: 717 Poplar St., Helena, Arkansas
- Coordinates: 34°31′46″N 90°35′38″W
- Area: less than one acre
- Built: 1858; 168 years ago
- Architectural style: Greek Revival
- Part of: Beech Street Historic District (ID86003314)
- NRHP reference No.: 73002270

Significant dates
- Added to NRHP: June 4, 1973
- Designated CP: January 30, 1987

The James C. Tappan House, also known as the Tappan-Pillow House, is a historic house at 717 Poplar Street in Helena, Arkansas. It is a two-story wood-frame structure, three bays wide, with a hip roof. A two-story porch projects from the main facade, topped by a Greek Revival triangular pediment with brackets. The porch is supported by square columns and has urn-shaped balusters.

== History ==
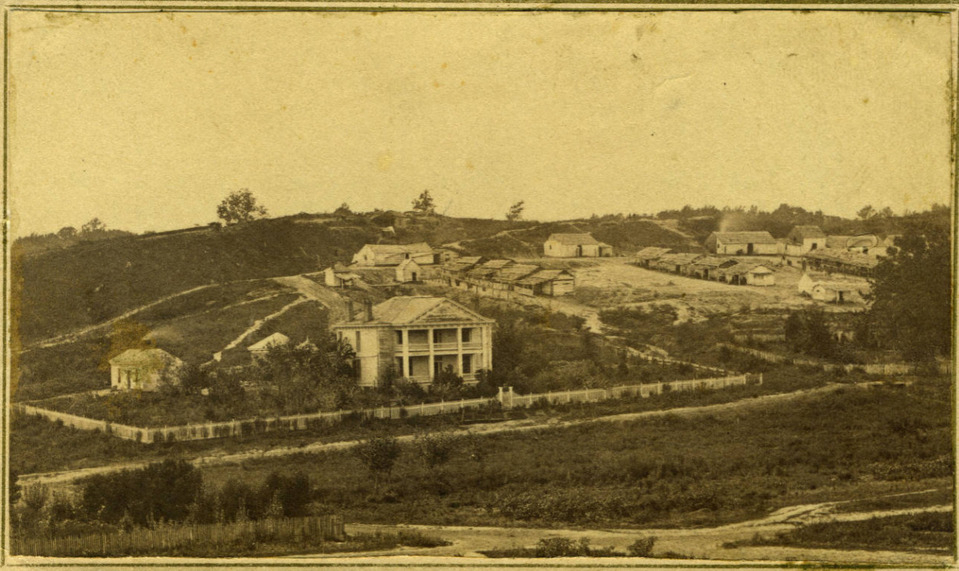
Tappan House and its environs in 1865

The house was built in 1858 for James C. Tappan, and is unusual for the extremely early appearance of otherwise later Victorian features in its design. Tappan served as a senior officer in the Confederate States Army during the Civil War; his house was occupied by higher-ranking United States Army officers during the occupation of Helena. The house was listed on the National Register of Historic Places on June 4, 1973.

== See also ==
- National Register of Historic Places listings in Phillips County, Arkansas
