= Tams Bixby =

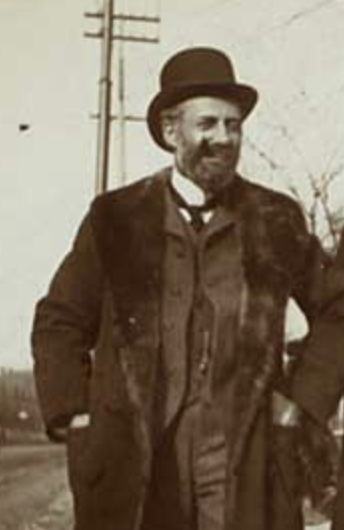
- Bixby in ~1900
- Born: December 12, 1855; Staunton, Virginia
- Died: January 17, 1922 (aged 66); Kansas City, Missouri
- Occupations: newsman, publisher, politician, administrator
- Known for: Work on Dawes Commission
- Notable work: Allocation of Indian tribal lands in Oklahoma

Tams Bixby (December 12, 1855 – January 17, 1922) was an American newsman, political operative and government agent. He was best known for his work on the Dawes Commission.

== Early years ==
Bixby was born to Bradford and Susan Bixby in Staunton, Virginia, probably on December 12, 1855. His family moved to Red Wing, Minnesota, where his father had bought a hotel and bakery in 1857. Bradford Bixby died there in 1873, leaving his widow and two sons, Tams and George to run the family business. According to his biography in the Encyclopedia of Oklahoma History and Culture (EOHC), Tams apparently was not interested in running a hotel and bakery, for by the 1880s he was already running two newspapers in Red Wing and had become quite involved in Republican Party politics. Bixby's rise in Minnesota's Republican Party was quite rapid.

== Work for the Dawes Commission ==
In 1883, President Grover Cleveland appointed a commission for the Five Civilized Tribes. (Note: This group of tribes, often called simply "The Five Tribes,"then living in Indian Territory, included the Cherokee, Chickasaw, Choctaw, Creek and Seminoles.) Its members included Judge Joseph A. Gill, Judge W. H. H. Clayton and Bixby (from 1893), to set up the machinery for electing delegates to the Constitutional Convention. This group of three men was also charged with subdividing the whole of Indian Territory into districts and precincts. Outside of incorporated cities, that had never before been done in Indian Territory. The commission would be known as the Dawes Commission in honor of Senator Henry L. Dawes, who had already been named as its chairman. President Cleveland subsequently appointed Tams Bixby as a member of the Dawes Commission. After Senator Dawes died in 1903, Bixby was promoted to chairman of the commission. Bixby was elevated to chairman after Senator Dawes' death in 1903. In that position, he was the official custodian of over two million of acres of land whose ownership was being transferred from the tribes to individual members. The organization he led numbered at least 500 people and occupied a large special-purpose building erected in downtown Muskogee. Decades later, a Muskogee reporter wrote that he was, "... arguably the most important figure in Indian Territory."

== Move to Muskogee ==
Until Bixby took over, focus of the commission was on negotiating treaty obligations; so the commission staff was relatively small and worked out of field offices in each of the Nations. The next step was actually enrolling the members of each tribe and preparing the land for allotment to the individuals. Bixby knew that this would be a time-consuming process, and that the staff must be greatly enlarged and co-located. Several towns in Indian Territory expressed great interest in becoming the site for this new activity. However, Bixby had already decided that Muskogee would be his choice. It had already been chosen as the seat of most important activities between the tribes and the Federal government; and the best railroad connections. The main drawback was that it did not have a large enough building.

Bixby approached Doctor F. B. Fite, a leading resident of Muskogee, about obtaining funding for a new building. Fite passed the issue to the city council. To reduce cost, Bixby was willing to accept a frame structure, rather than brick construction. The building was constructed at the corner of Second Street and Okmulgee Avenue and housed 500 clerks working on appraisals of over two million acres of land. Decades later, Jonita Mullins, a reporter for the Muskogee Phoenix, wrote that during Bixby's 10-year tenure as head of the Dawes Commission, he was,"... arguably the most important figure in Indian Territory."

== Retirement from Dawes Commission ==
When the Dawes Commission expired in July, 1905, Bixby was appointed as commissioner of the Five Civilized Tribes. He retired from government work in 1906 and returned to working in journalism, becoming the president of the Muskogee Daily Phoenix organization, which he bought outright in 1907. He then returned to his home state of Minnesota, operated a St. Paul newspaper and started a townsite development. He returned to Muskogee in 1910, resumed running the Daily Phoenix and bought the Muskogee Times-Democrat.

== Personal ==
Tams Bixby married Clara Mues in 1886. They had three sons Joel, Edson, and Tams, Jr.

== Death ==
Bixby died in a Kansas City, Missouri, hospital while traveling from Muskogee to California on January 17, 1922. His body was sent to Muskogee, where a memorial service was held, during which the town was shut down for an hour. According to the Phoenix, hundreds of people stood outdoors in the cold as the local American Legion post escorted the casket to the railroad depot to board a train for Minnesota, where the body was interred in the Bixby family cemetery in Red Wing.
