= Louis Sulzbacher =

American judge (1842–1915)

Judge for the Western District of the United States Court for the Indian Territory
- In office 1904 – November 16, 1907
- Appointed by: Theodore Roosevelt
- Preceded by: Position established
- Succeeded by: Position disestablished

Associate Justice of the Supreme Court of Puerto Rico
- In office August 1900 – 1904
- Appointed by: William McKinley
- Preceded by: Juan Morera Martínez
- Succeeded by: Adolph Grant Wolf

Personal details
- Born: May 10, 1842 Kirchheimbolanden, Kingdom of Bavaria
- Died: January 17, 1915 (aged 72) New York City, U.S.

Louis Sulzbacher (May 10, 1842 – January 17, 1915) was the first continental American appointed as Associate Justice of the newly created Supreme Court of Puerto Rico in 1900. Appointed by President William McKinley he assumed his post in August 1900 and served until 1904.

== Early life and family ==
Louis M. Sulzbacher was born in Kirchheimbolanden, Kingdom of Bavaria on May 10, 1842, to Jacob Sulzbacher and Regina Schwarz. Jacob was a professor and writer for several newspapers, while Regina was German language scholar educated in Paris. The Sulzbacher family was Jewish and claimed descendancy from Saul Wahl and Rashi. He studied in Frankfurt and was fluent in English, German, Greek, Spanish, French and Latin.

== Move to United States ==
He moved to the United States in 1859 and settled in New Mexico Territory where he read the law. In 1870, he was admitted to the territorial bar before starting a law practice in Las Vegas. He married Paulina Flersheim in Kansas City, Missouri, in 1869. During the Spanish-American War he served in the Rough Riders.

In 1900, President William McKinley appointed Sulzbacher, who was fluent in Spanish, as one of the first judges of the Supreme Court of Puerto Rico. He served on that court until his appointment to the United States Court for the Indian Territory's Western District in 1904 by Theodore Roosevelt. He left the bench upon statehood on November 16, 1907.

Sulzbacher practiced law in Kansas City after leaving the bench. He died in New York on January 17, 1915. He was buried in Kansas City. After his death he was honored by the Supreme Court of Puerto Rico in a Memorial Resolution on January 29, 1915.

Legal offices
Preceded by Juan Morera Martínez	Associate Justice to the Supreme Court of Puerto Rico; 1900–1904	Succeeded by Adolph Grant Wolf
