= Joseph Dickerson =

American politician (1864–1954)

Member of the Oklahoma House of Representatives
- In office 1914–1916

Judge of the United States Court for the Indian Territory
- In office 1904 – November 16, 1907
- Appointed by: Theodore Roosevelt
- Preceded by: Position established
- Succeeded by: Position disestablished

Personal details
- Born: January 8, 1864 Lewisburg, Ohio
- Died: February 7, 1954 (aged 90) Edmond, Oklahoma
- Resting place: Memorial Park Cemetery, Oklahoma City
- Party: Republican
- Education: University of Kansas

Joseph Thomas Dickerson was an American judge and politician who served on the United States Court for the Indian Territory between 1904 and 1907, in the Oklahoma House of Representatives between 1914 and 1916, and as an appointed judge in Oklahoma County.

== Early life and career ==
Joseph Thomas Dickerson was born to Thomas and Hannah Dickerson on January 8, 1864, in Lewisburg, Ohio. His family moved to Iowa before settling in Kansas where he attended the University of Kansas; he graduated in 1887. An active member of the Republican Party, he practiced law in Marion, Kansas and was close with U.S. senator Charles Curtis.

== Judgeships and political career ==
In 1904, the United States Congress created four additional judgeships for Indian Territory and Dickerson was appointed to fill one of the new seats in the Southern District by Theodore Roosevelt; he served until statehood. After statehood, he served on the State Board of Affairs. He ran as the Republican Party's nominee in the 1912 U.S. Senate election. In 1914 he was elected to one term in the Oklahoma House of Representatives. During his term, he was one of the impeachment managers for A.P. Watson's impeachment trial. After retiring from the Oklahoma House he practiced law in Oklahoma County. In 1934, Democratic governor William H. Murray appointed Dickerson to serve on the newly created common pleas court in Oklahoma County.

== Legal career ==
After graduating from the University of Kansas in 1887, Dickerson was admitted to the bar and practised law in Marion, Kansas, where he became an active member of the Republican Party and developed a close professional relationship with future U.S. Senator Charles Curtis.

In 1904, Dickerson was appointed by President Theodore Roosevelt to the newly created southern district seat of the United States Court for the Indian Territory, one of four new judgeships established by Congress to manage the territory's growing caseload ahead of statehood. He served until the court was dissolved upon Oklahoma's admission to the Union on November 16, 1907.

== Oklahoma politics and later career ==
Following statehood, Dickerson was elected to the Oklahoma House of Representatives in 1914, serving one term until 1916. After leaving the legislature, he practised law in Oklahoma County for the remainder of his career. Despite being a lifelong Republican, Dickerson was appointed by Democratic governor William H. Murray to serve as a judge on the common pleas court in Oklahoma County in 1934 — a notable cross-party appointment.

== Personal life and death ==
Dickerson married Carrie Sacket in 1891. He died on February 7, 1954, in Edmond, Oklahoma and is buried at Memorial Park Cemetery in Oklahoma City.

== Electoral history ==
Oklahoma Supreme Court 4th district Republican primary (August 4, 1908)
Party	Candidate	Votes	%
Republican	Joseph Dickerson	5,601	98.9%
Republican	George W. Richardson	60	1.1%
Turnout		5,661	

1908 Oklahoma Supreme Court 4th district election
Party	Candidate	Votes	%	±%
Democratic	Samuel W. Hayes	120,657	48.2	−6.6%
Republican	Joseph Dickerson	108,577	43.4%	+2%
Socialist	A.W. Bennett	21,089	8.4%	+4.7%
Democratic hold		Swing	N/A	
