= T. C. Humphrey =

American politician

Thomas C. Humphrey
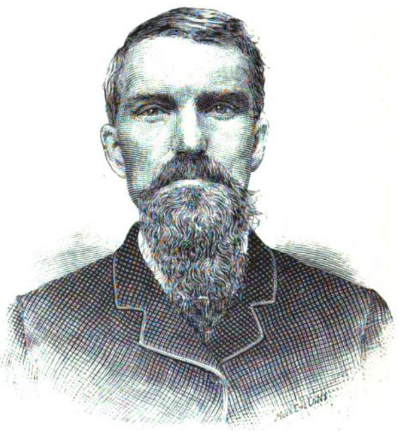
- Humphrey c. 1887

Judge for Central District of the United States Court for the Indian Territory
- In office 1904 – November 16, 1907
- Appointed by: Theodore Roosevelt
- Preceded by: Position established
- Succeeded by: Position disestablished

Speaker of the Arkansas House of Representatives
- In office January 9, 1893 – January 14, 1895
- Preceded by: Elias W. Rector
- Succeeded by: John C. Colquitt

Member of the Arkansas House of Representatives
- In office 1893–1895
- In office 1875–1876

Personal details
- Born: Thomas Chauncey Humphrey; December 20, 1846 Magazine, Arkansas
- Died: December 3, 1937 (aged 90) Hugo, Oklahoma
- Party: Republican (after 1900); Democratic (before 1900)

Thomas Chauncey Humphrey (December 20, 1846 – December 3, 1937) was an American politician and judge who served in the Arkansas House of Representatives, as Speaker of the Arkansas House of Representatives, and as a federal judge for Indian Territory.

== Biography ==
Thomas Chauncey Humphrey was born on December 20, 1846, in Magazine, Arkansas. As a teenager, he joined the Confederate States Army and fought at the Battle of Prairie D'Ane and the Battle of Marks' Mills. After the war he worked as a teacher, earned a medical degree, and passed the bar. He served in the 20th Arkansas General Assembly representing White County, Arkansas from November 10, 1874, to December 10, 1875. He also served in the 29th Arkansas General Assembly from January 9, to April 8, 1893 representing Sebastian County, Arkansas. He served as the Speaker of the Arkansas House of Representatives from 1893 to 1895. About 1900, he moved to Indian Territory and worked as an attorney. He represented Solomon Hotema, a Native American Presbyterian minister convicted of killing several people he believed to be witches. After moving to Indian Territory, he left the Democratic Party and joined the Republican Party. He was appointed to the Central District of the United States Court for the Indian Territory in 1904 by Theodore Roosevelt and served until Oklahoma statehood in 1907. He was a presidential elector for Herbert Hoover's 1928 presidential campaign. He moved to Hugo, Oklahoma after leaving the bench and died on December 3, 1937.

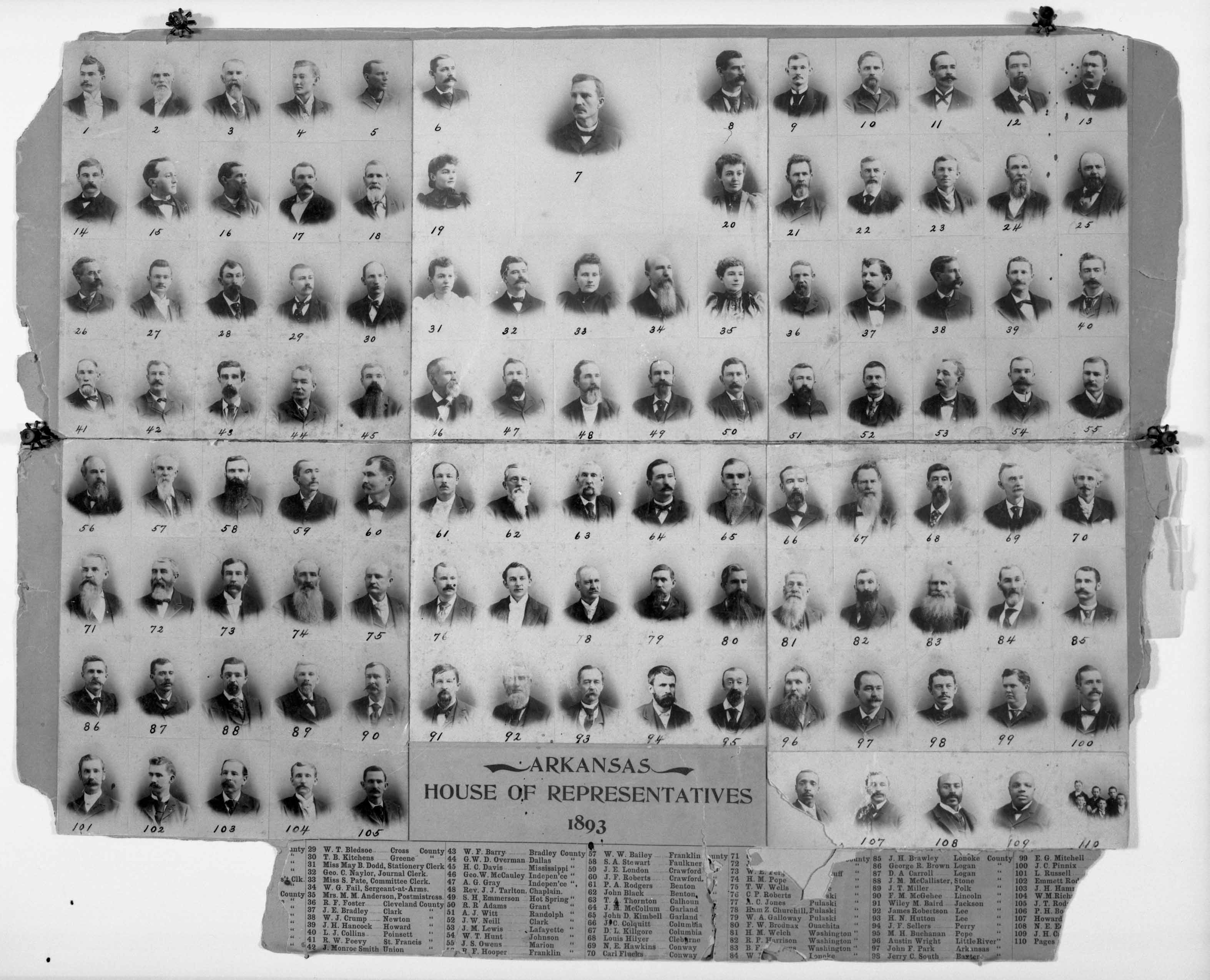
Composite photograph of 1893 Arkansas House of Representatives
