= James Camp Tappan =

32nd Speaker of the Arkansas House of Representatives

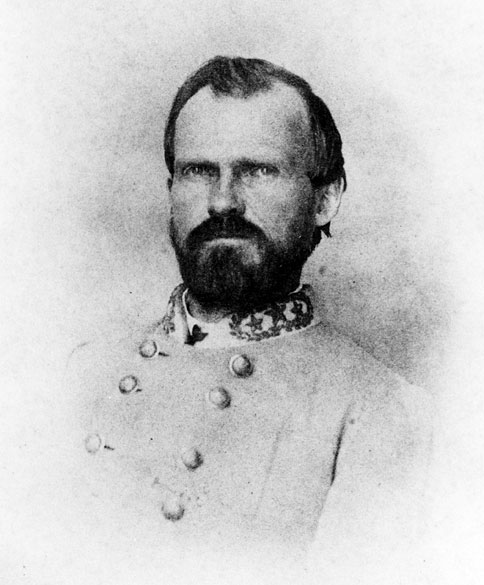
- Tappan in uniform, c. 1864

31st Speaker of the Arkansas House of Representatives
- In office January 11, 1897 – January 9, 1899
- Preceded by: John C. Colquitt
- Succeeded by: A. F. Vandeventer

Member of the Arkansas House of Representatives from Phillips County
- In office January 11, 1897 – January 14, 1901 Serving with John W. Keesee
- In office November 4, 1850 – November 1, 1852 Serving with W. E. Preston
- Preceded by: John Martin and W. E. Preston
- Succeeded by: G. Geffries and A. Wilkins

Personal details
- Born: September 9, 1825 Franklin, Tennessee, U.S.
- Died: March 19, 1906 (aged 80) Helena, Arkansas, U.S.
- Resting place: Maple Hill Cemetery, Helena-West Helena, Arkansas, U.S. 34°32′34.5″N 90°35′24.2″W
- Party: Democratic
- Spouse: Mary Elizabeth Anderson (m. 1854; died 1900)
- Children: 1
- Education: Yale College (BA)

Military service
- Allegiance: Confederate States
- Branch/service: Confederate States Army
- Years of service: 1861–1865
- Rank: Brigadier-General
- Battles/wars: American Civil War; Battle of Belmont; Battle of Shiloh; Battle of Richmond; Battle of Perryville; Battle of Mansfield; Battle of Pleasant Hill; Battle of Jenkins' Ferry; Price's Missouri Expedition

James Camp Tappan (September 9, 1825 – March 19, 1906) was an American lawyer from Helena who served as the 31st speaker of the Arkansas House of Representatives from 1897 to 1899. A member of the Democratic Party, Tappan previously served as an Arkansas state representative from Phillips County (1850–1852 and 1897–1901). He also served as a senior officer of the Confederate States Army in the Western and Trans-Mississippi theaters of the American Civil War.

== Early life and education ==
James Camp Tappan was born in Franklin, Tennessee, where his parents had migrated from Newburyport, Massachusetts. He attended Phillips Exeter Academy in Exeter, New Hampshire, and graduated from Yale University in 1845. He studied law at Vicksburg, Mississippi, and was admitted to the bar in 1846. He soon moved to Helena, Arkansas. He was elected to two non-consecutive terms in the Arkansas House of Representatives and also served as a circuit court judge. From 1852-1860 he was the receiver for the United States land office in Helena.

== American Civil War ==
At the outbreak of the American Civil War, Tappan's sympathies lay with the Confederate cause (despite his Northern parents), and he joined the Confederate army. In May 1861 he received a commission as Colonel of the 13th Arkansas Infantry. He commanded his regiment at the Battle of Belmont and made repeated charges on the "Hornet's Nest" at the Battle of Shiloh. After Shiloh, he took part in the Kentucky Campaign and fought at the battles of Richmond and Perryville.

On November 5, 1862, Tappan received his commission as a brigadier-general and was transferred to the Trans-Mississippi Department under Major-General Sterling Price. He commanded his brigade at the Battle of Pleasant Hill, defending against Maj. Gen. Nathaniel Banks' Red River Campaign of 1864. His brigade was moved northward back into Arkansas to meet Major-General Frederick Steele at the Battle of Jenkins' Ferry. He also took part in Price's Missouri Expedition.

== Later life ==
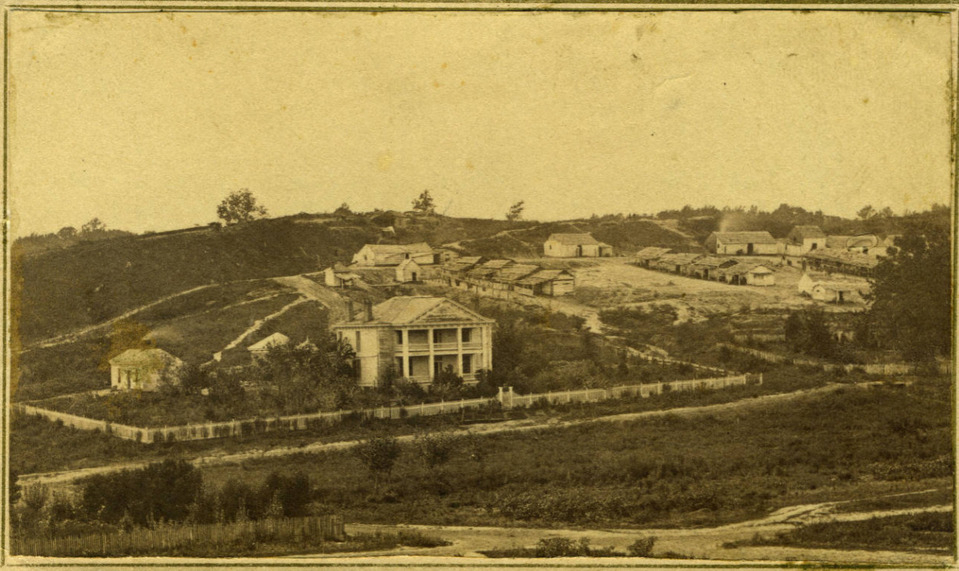
Tappan House and its environs in 1865

After the war, Tappan returned to Helena, Arkansas, and resumed his law practice, where he established himself as the dean of the Arkansas bar. He also engaged in politics after the Reconstruction period and served again in the Arkansas legislature. Tappan was nominated by the Democratic party for Governor of Arkansas on two occasions but declined to run. He died on March 19, 1906, at Helena and was buried at Maple Hill Cemetery near the graves of Confederate generals Thomas C. Hindman and Patrick Cleburne.

The James C. Tappan House was listed on the U.S. National Register of Historic Places on June 4, 1973.

== See also ==
- List of Confederate generals
- List of people from Tennessee
- List of Phillips Exeter Academy people
- List of speakers of the Arkansas House of Representatives
- List of Yale University people

== Sources ==
- Eicher, John H., and David J. Eicher, Civil War High Commands. Stanford: Stanford University Press, 2001. ISBN 978-0-8047-3641-1.
- Sifakis, Stewart. Who Was Who in the Civil War. New York: Facts On File, 1988. ISBN 978-0-8160-1055-4.
- Warner, Ezra J. (1959). Generals in Gray: Lives of the Confederate Commanders (1st ed.). Baton Rouge: Louisiana State University Press. OCLC 445052.
