= William McKendree Springer =

American politician (1836–1903)

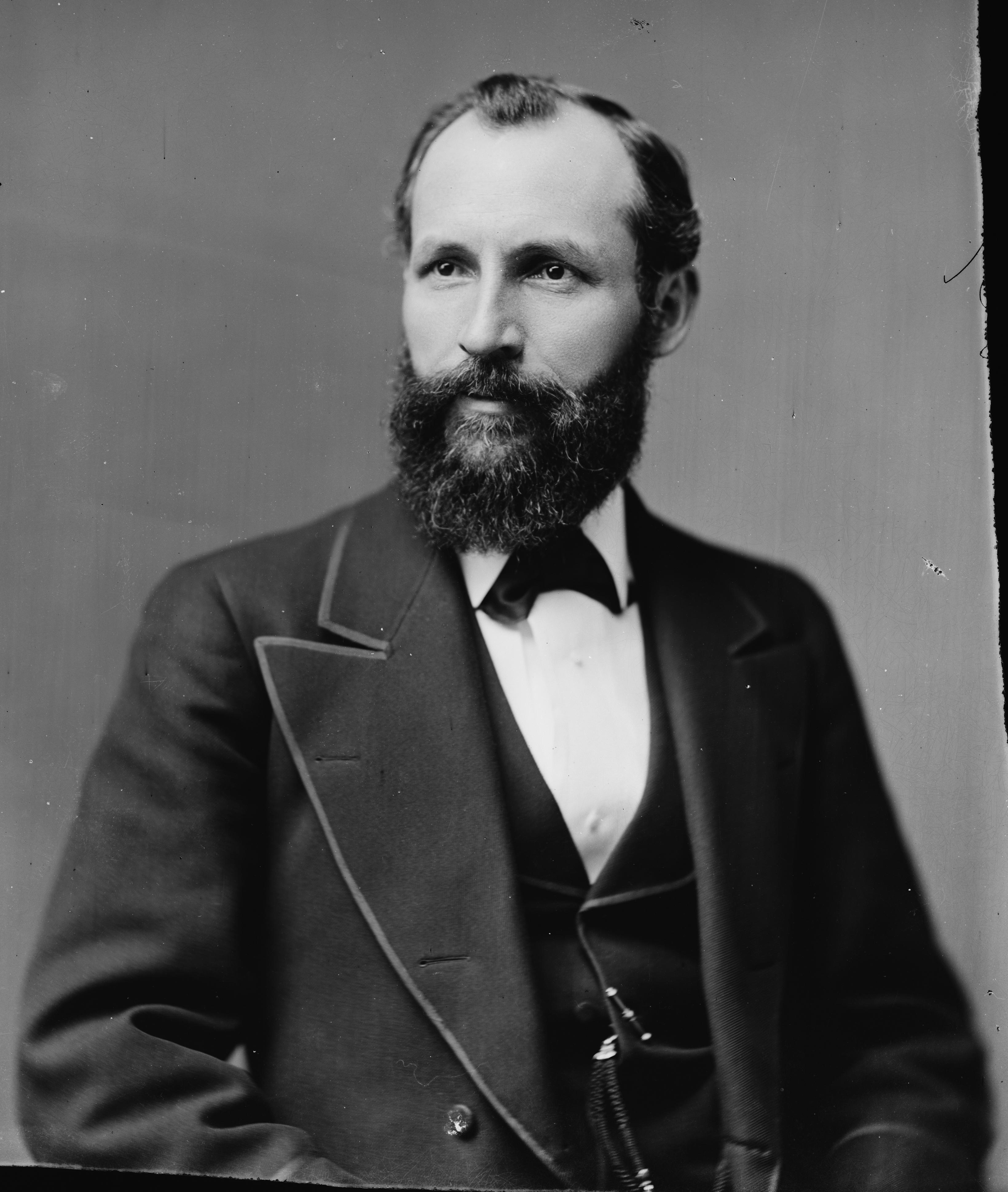
- Springer, 1870–1880

Judge for the Northern District of the United States Court for the Indian Territory
- In office 1895–1899
- Appointed by: Grover Cleveland
- Preceded by: Position established
- Succeeded by: Joseph A. Gill

Member of the U.S. House of Representatives from Illinois
- In office March 4, 1875 – March 3, 1895
- Preceded by: James Carroll Robinson
- Succeeded by: Vespasian Warner
- Constituency: 12th district (1875–83); 13th district (1883–95)

Member of the Illinois House of Representatives
- In office 1871–1872

Personal details
- Born: May 30, 1836 New Lebanon, Indiana, U.S.
- Died: December 4, 1903 (aged 67) Washington, D.C., U.S.
- Party: Democratic

William McKendree Springer (May 30, 1836 – December 4, 1903) was an American attorney and politician who represented Illinois in the United States House of Representatives and served on the United States Court for the Indian Territory.

== Early life and education ==
William McKendree Springer was born near New Lebanon, Sullivan County, Indiana, on May 30, 1836. He later moved west to Jacksonville, Illinois, with his parents in 1848. He attended the local public schools New Lebanon and Jacksonville.

He attended the Illinois College at Jacksonville, Illinois where he was a member of the Phi Alpha Literary Society. He left the college after defending Stephen A. Douglas and the Kansas-Nebraska Act and finished a master's degree from Indiana University at Bloomington in 1858. He worked as a journalist, read the law, and was admitted to the bar in 1859 or 1861. He started his career in the state capital of Springfield, Illinois.

== Political career ==
During the American Civil War, he served as secretary of the Illinois State constitutional convention meeting in 1862 . He was a candidate for the Illinois Legislature in 1860 and 1864. At the young age of 26 he briefly served as assistant secretary of the Illinois Senate. Also during the war, he objected to the constitutionality of income taxes leading to the United States Supreme Court case Springer v. United States. He traveled to Europe between 1868 and 1871. After returning to America, he was elected to the Illinois House of Representatives in Springfield during 1871 and 1872.

Springer was first elected as a Democrat in November 1874 to the 44th United States Congress. He took the oath of office the following March, and was reelected for nine 2-year terms in the late 19th century (March 4, 1875 – March 3, 1895). In Washington, he was chairman of the House Committee on Expenditures in the Department of State (44th and 45th Congresses), Committee on Elections (46th Congresses), Committee on Expenditures in the Department of Justice (48th Congress), Committee on Claims (49th Congress), Committee on Territories (50th Congress), Committee on Ways and Means (52nd Congress), Committee on Banking and Currency (53rd Congress).

During his time in Congress, he was involved in the investigation of election fraud during the 1876 United States presidential election. While on the Committee on Territories, Springer framed the bills that organized the new Oklahoma Territory in 1889 and 1890. He also helped create the United States Court for the Indian Territory. Springer drafted a legislative amendment to the Indian Appropriations Act of 1890 which became known as the Springer Amendment and began the process of placing the former Unassigned Lands of the Indian Territory within the federal public domain for later distribution to homesteaders.

== Judicial career and return to private practice ==
After two decades of service in Washington, he was defeated for reelection in 1894 due to the split between Gold Democrats and Silver Democrats. He was appointed by Democratic President Grover Cleveland as a judge for the Northern District of the United States Court for the Indian Territory. In 1899, Springer left his judicial post to establish private law offices in both Chicago and Washington, D.C. He also worked for the National Livestock Association as their capital affairs lobbyist, where he learned of the Kiowa Indian reserve's grasslands. He also represented the Muscogee Nation and Cherokee Nation.

In 1901, Springer was hired by numerous Indians from the Kiowa, Comanche, and Apache Reservation to represent them in what became the federal court case of Lone Wolf v. Hitchcock, 187 U.S. 553 (1903). Springer had aided in the writing of a memorial to Republican then 26th President Theodore Roosevelt (1857–1919, served 1901–1909), protesting the 1900 Act that resulted from the Jerome Agreement between the Indians from the Kiowa, Comanche, and Apache Reservation and the members of the Jerome Commission. In the Jerome Agreement, the tribes of the K.C.A. Reservation ceded most of their lands to the United States federal government who would then open it up for allotment to white settlers. Lone Wolf asserted and Springer argued on his behalf in federal court that:

1. The Kiowa, Comanche, and Apache Indians were fraudulently induced to sign the Jerome Agreement and those that did sign, did not fully understand its provisions vastly because, (like Lone Wolf), most of the Indians did not speak or understand very well of the English language and relied on interpreters.
2. The Jerome Agreement was not signed by three-fourths of the adult male members of the tribes as required by the Medicine Lodge Treaty. Lone Wolf alleged that the total number of Indian males exceeded the number claimed by the Indian Agent and that the 1900 United States census showed there were 639 adult male members of the K.C.A. tribes on the reservation. Thus the Jerome Agreement was twenty-three signatures short of the required three-quarters majority amount.
3. The K.C.A. tribes had protested the agreement from the beginning.
4. The version that was ratified by the U.S. Congress had been significantly altered and amended and the subsequent later changes made had not been resubmitted to the K.C.A. peoples for their approval. Judge Springer argued for Lone Wolf that the American Congress should not be able to unilaterally alter the provisions of the agreement without the Indians' mutual consent and thus the legislative Act should be rejected.

On July 22, 1901, Springer, aided by sympathetic fellow attorneys Hays McMeehan, William C. Reeves, and Charles Porter Johnson, filed for a temporary restraining order and a permanent injunction halting the cession of territories and the opening of surplus lands after the members of the K.C.A. tribes had been given their individual allotments. The request for the restraining order was denied by U.S. Judge Clinton F. Irwin. Springer and his lawyer colleagues appealed to The Supreme Court for the District of Columbia in Washington where on June 21, 1901, Justice Andrew Coyle Bradley denied again the K.C.A.'s application for a temporary injunction. Springer appealed the District Court's decision to the U.S. Court of Appeals for the District of Columbia where the decision in the lower courts was upheld once again on December 4, 1901, by Chief Justice Richard H. Alvey.

Finally, Springer, now aided by attorney Hampton Carson who was also hired by the Indian Rights Association, appealed to the full higher United States Supreme Court and where once again, he was unsuccessful in his appeal. On January 5, 1903, in a unanimous decision, the High Court affirmed the lower Court of Appeals and upheld the original Congressional action. The Court rejected the Indians' and Springer – Carson's argument that Congress' action was an unfair taking under the Due Process Clause of the Fifth Amendment to the U.S. Constitution. Justice Edward Douglass White described the Indians as the wards of the nation and matters involving Indian lands were the sole jurisdiction of the Congress. So the Congress, therefore, had the power to abrogate the provisions of an Indian treaty, including the two million acres change. Justice John M. Harlan concurred in the judgment. This case maintained that the federal government had always had plenary power over native tribes and could unilaterally abrogate Indian treaty rights despite the protests of the tribes.

Springer died at age 67 from pneumonia at his home in Washington, D.C., on December 4, 1903, with notices and obituaries in numerous national newspapers. He was buried in the Oak Ridge Cemetery, at the state capital Springfield, Illinois.

U.S. House of Representatives
Preceded by James C. Robinson	Member of the U.S. House of Representatives from Illinois's 12th congressional district 1875–1883	Succeeded by James M. Riggs
Preceded by Dietrich C. Smith	Member of the U.S. House of Representatives from Illinois's 13th congressional district 1883–1895	Succeeded by Vespasian Warner
