= John R. Thomas =

American politician

John Robert Thomas
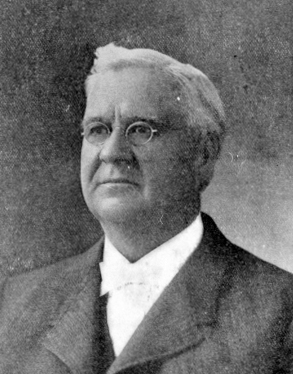

Roving Judge for the United States Court for the Indian Territory
- In office June 30, 1897 – June 30, 1901
- Appointed by: William McKinley
- Preceded by: Position established
- Succeeded by: Charles W. Raymond

Member of the U.S. House of Representatives from Illinois
- In office March 4, 1879 – March 3, 1889
- Preceded by: William Hartzell (18th); District established (20th)
- Succeeded by: William Ralls Morrison (18th); George Washington Smith (20th)
- Constituency: 18th district (1879-83); 20th district (1883-89)

Personal details
- Born: October 11, 1846 Mount Vernon, Illinois, U.S.
- Died: January 19, 1914 (aged 67) McAlester, Oklahoma, U.S.
- Resting place: Arlington National Cemetery, Virginia, U.S.
- Party: Republican
- Spouse: Charlotte Maria Culver
- Children: 2
- Occupation: Attorney

John Robert Thomas, Sr. (October 11, 1846 – January 19, 1914), also known as J. R. Thomas, was a U.S. representative from Illinois. He was later appointed a U.S. district judge in the Indian Territory, which then encompassed most of the eastern part of present-day Oklahoma, serving from 1898 to 1901. After statehood, he served on the Oklahoma State Code Commission which was tasked with reviewing and editing the new state laws that had been hastily put together during the rush to statehood. After returning to his private law practice, he went to the Oklahoma state prison at McAlester to interview an inmate on January 19, 1914, when he was killed by three other inmates who shot him to death while escaping prison.

Judge Thomas was also the father of Carolyn T. Foreman, who married attorney Grant Foreman in 1905. After their marriage and the judge's death, Carolyn and Grant Foreman become noted Oklahoma historians.

== Biography ==
Born in Mount Vernon, Illinois, John Robert Thomas attended the common schools and Hunter Collegiate Institute, Princeton, Indiana. He served in the Union Army during the American Civil War, and rose from the rank of private to that of captain of Company D, One Hundred and Twentieth Regiment, Indiana Volunteer Infantry. Thomas was wounded at the Battle of Franklin, Tennessee. Wilson wrote that he never fully recovered from his wound. He was of Welsh descent.

After the war, Thomas studied law and was admitted to the bar in 1869. He became city attorney of Metropolis, Illinois, 1869 and 1870 and served as State's attorney 1871–1874.

=== U.S. House of Representatives ===
Thomas was elected as a Republican to the Forty-sixth and to the four succeeding Congresses (March 4, 1879 – March 3, 1889). He served as chairman of the Committee on Levees and Improvements of the Mississippi River (Forty-seventh Congress).

In 1883, Thomas was one of only seven House Republicans to vote against the Pendleton Civil Service Reform Act, which replaced the traditional spoils system with a bureaucratic civil service system. The conservative "Stalwart" faction of the Republican Party which earlier opposed civil service reform almost entirely voted for the Pendleton Act under immense political pressure following the assassination of James A. Garfield.

He was not a candidate for renomination in 1888.

=== Later career ===
He resumed the practice of law in Muskogee, Oklahoma, and also served as a United States judge in the Indian Territory from June 30, 1897, to June 30, 1901. During this service, he handed down the first death penalty ever issued in the Territory. In 1899, he tried a group of white men who were arrested and convicted of torturing and murdering two Seminole boys. The men were convicted of the crimes, which angered a great many white settlers.

Although he personally favored the two-state proposal for Oklahoma statehood, he later realized that the national government, which was dominated by his own party, would never approve the possibility of adding four more Democratic senators in Washington D. C. So, he changed his mind and supported the single-state proposal at the Republican convention. He was nominated for judge of the supreme court by the first Republican State convention of Oklahoma, but declined the nomination. Instead, he served as member of the Oklahoma State Code Commission 1908–1910.

He died in McAlester, Oklahoma on January 19, 1914, and was interred in Green Hill Cemetery, Muskogee, Oklahoma. He was reinterred later in Arlington National Cemetery.

== Death ==
According to an account by J. Stanley Clark that appeared in the Chronicles of Oklahoma in 1974, Judge Thomas had gone to the penitentiary to interview Abraham Collier, who was serving a seven-year sentence for larceny. While he was in the warden's office, an attempted prison break occurred. Three other convicts, Tom Lane, Chiney Reed, and Charles Kuntz, had obtained a gun and taken keys to unlock their cells. They broke into the warden's office and ordered everyone inside to stand up with their hands in the air. Thomas, who was described as physically stout, did not respond quickly, reached for his cane, and was fatally shot in the heart.

The intruders also killed deputy warden D. D. Oates, cell house sergeant F. C. Godfrey, and police photographer H. H. Dover. They attempted to leave the prison using stenographer Mary Foster, who was wounded in the melée, and parole officer Frank H. Rice as human shields, but were killed.

== Family ==
He was the son of Major William Allen Thomas and Caroline (Neely) Thomas. He married Charlotte "Lottie" Maria Culver in 1870. Their daughter, Carolyn, who married Grant Foreman, was an author and historian who wrote several books about Native Americans and the history of Oklahoma. A son, John R. Thomas Jr., was a "celebrated hero of the Spanish–American War with the Rough Riders." In 1884, while serving as a U.S. congressman, John Robert Thomas was also Grand Master for the Ancient Free and Accepted Masons of the State of Illinois.

== Notes ==
U.S. House of Representatives
Preceded by William Hartzell	Member of the U.S. House of Representatives from Illinois's 18th congressional district 1879-1883	Succeeded by William Ralls Morrison
Preceded by District created	Member of the U.S. House of Representatives from Illinois's 20th congressional district 1883-1889	Succeeded by George Washington Smith
