= Charles W. Raymond (judge) =

American judge (1858–1939)

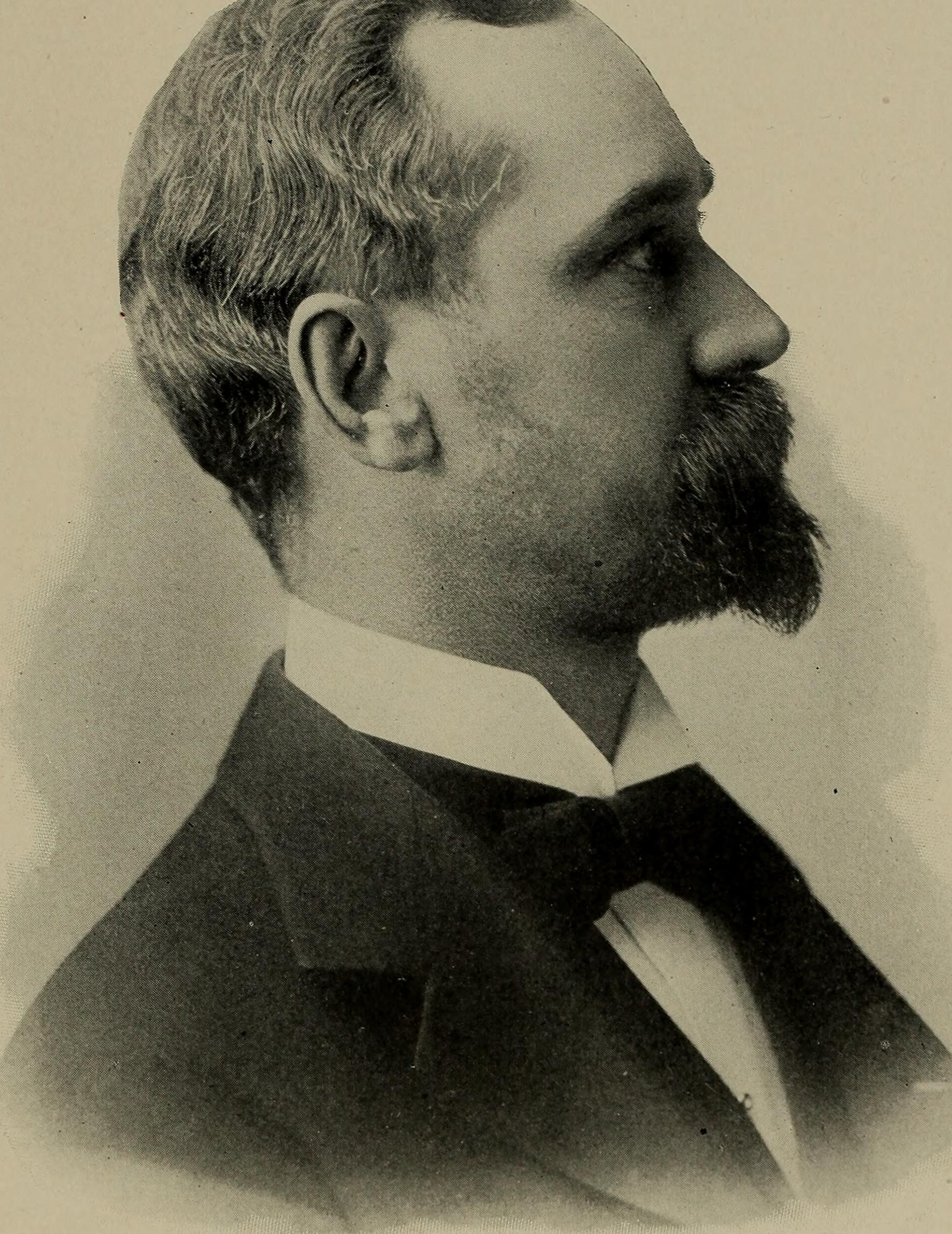

Judge for the Western District of the United States Court for the Indian Territory
- In office 1902 – November 16, 1907
- Appointed by: Theodore Roosevelt
- Preceded by: Position established
- Succeeded by: Position disestablished

Roving Judge for the United States Court for the Indian Territory
- In office 1901–1902
- Appointed by: William McKinley
- Preceded by: John R. Thomas
- Succeeded by: Position disestablished

Personal details
- Born: August 28, 1858 Dubuque, Iowa
- Died: September 28, 1939 (aged 81) Watseka, Illinois
- Resting place: Onarga, Illinois
- Education: Wabash College

Charles W. Raymond (August 8, 1858 – September 28, 1939) was an American judge who served on the United States Court for the Indian Territory between 1901 and Oklahoma statehood on November 16, 1907.

== Biography ==
Charles W. Raymond was born on August 28, 1858, to William and Mary Raymond in Dubuque, Iowa. His father served in the Union Army and died at the Battle of Nashville. After his father's death his mother left him to work as a laborer on a farm. He eventually rejoined his mother and attended Wabash College. He worked as a deputy court clerk, read the law, and was admitted to the bar. In 1901, he was appointed as a roving judge for the United States Court for the Indian Territory by William McKinley. In 1902, he was appointed as the first judge for the Western District of the same court by Theodore Roosevelt. He left office upon Oklahoma statehood on November 16, 1907, and moved to Illinois. He died on September 28, 1939, in Watseka, Illinois. He was buried in Onarga, Illinois.
