= James H. Jones (Texas politician) =

American politician, lawyer and military officer (1830–1904)

Member of the U.S. House of Representatives from Texas's 3rd district
- In office March 4, 1883 – March 3, 1887
- Preceded by: Olin Wellborn
- Succeeded by: Constantine B. Kilgore

Personal details
- Born: James Henry Jones; September 13, 1830 Shelby County, Alabama, US
- Died: March 22, 1904 (aged 73) Henderson, Texas, US
- Relations: Tignal W. Jones (brother)
- Occupation: Politician, lawyer, military officer
- Profession: Politician, lawyer

Military service
- Allegiance: Confederate States of America
- Branch/service: Confederate States Army
- Rank: Colonel
- Unit: 11th Texas Infantry Regiment
- Battles/wars: American Civil War; Red River campaign; Battle of Pleasant Hill

James Henry Jones (September 13, 1830 – March 22, 1904) was an American politician, lawyer, and military officer. During the American Civil War, he was a colonel in the Confederate States Army. A Democrat, he was a member of the United States House of Representatives from Texas, from 1883 to 1887.

== Early life ==
Jones was born on September 13, 1830, in Shelby County, Alabama, the son of Willis H. Jones and Mary H. (née Taylor) Jones. His brother was military officer Tignal W. Jones. He and his family later moved to Talladega County.

== Career ==
Jones read law, and in 1851, was admitted to the bar, after which he practiced law in Henderson, Texas. In an obituary in The Beaumont Enterprise, he was described as a "one of the pioneer lawyers and jurists of the state".

During the American Civil War, Jones served in the Confederate States Army. He led a company of the 11th Texas Infantry Regiment, under Oran Milo Roberts. He fought in the Red River campaign and was wounded at the Battle of Pleasant Hill. He was then promoted to colonel, commanding the 3rd Brigade of Walker's Greyhounds.

A Democrat, Jones was a delegate to the 1880 Democratic National Convention. He was a member of the United States House of Representatives from March 4, 1884 to March 3, 1887. He represented Texas's 3rd district. He was not a candidate in the following election. While serving, he was a member of the House Committees on Post Office and Post Roads and on Mines and Mining. Ideologically, he was liberal.

After serving in Congress, Jones returned to practicing law in Henderson.

== Personal life and death ==
Whether or not Jones was married to had children is unknown. He died there on March 22, 1904, aged 73, and was buried at the New Cemetery in Henderson.

U.S. House of Representatives
Preceded by Olin Wellborn	Member of the U.S. House of Representatives from Texas's 3rd congressional district 1883–1887	Succeeded by Constantine B. Kilgore
