= William Yancey Lewis =

American judge (1861–1915)

Yancey Lewis

Judge for the Central District of the United States Court for the Indian Territory
- In office 1895–1897
- Appointed by: Grover Cleveland
- Preceded by: Charles Bingley Stuart
- Succeeded by: W. H. H. Clayton

Personal details
- Born: William Yancey Lewis; August 24, 1861 Gonzales, Texas, U.S.
- Died: March 10, 1915 (aged 53) Dallas, Texas, U.S.
- Party: Democratic Party

William Yancey Lewis (August 24, 1861 - March 10, 1915) was an American judge who served on the United States Court for the Indian Territory between 1895 and 1897.

== Biography ==
William Yancey Lewis was born on August 24, 1861, to Everett Lewis and Alice Strickland in Gonzales, Texas. After attending public schools in Gonzales, he received an appointment to West Point, but failed his math exam. He declined a reappointment and instead attended Emory and Henry College graduating in 1881. He attended law school at the University of Texas and graduated in 1885. He was a delegate to the 1892 Democratic National Convention. He founded a law firm with Charles Bingley Stuart, married Lulie Sanford in 1884, and moved to Ardmore, Indian Territory in 1895. He represented Indian Territory at the 1900 Democratic National Convention.

Lewis was appointed to the Central District of the United States Court for the Indian Territory by President Grover Cleveland in 1895, replacing his former law partner Stuart on the bench. When President William McKinley tried to remove Lewis from the bench, he initially resisted before leaving office in 1897. After leaving the bench, he practice law in McAlester, Oklahoma and Dallas, Texas. He was a faculty member and dean of the University of Texas School of Law. He died in Dallas on March 10, 1915.
