= Charles Bingley Stuart =

American judge

Justice of the United States Court for the Indian Territory
- In office 1893–1895
- Appointed by: Grover Cleveland
- Preceded by: James Shackelford
- Succeeded by: William Yancey Lewis

Personal details
- Born: April 4, 1857 Mecklenburg County, Virginia
- Died: October 30, 1936 (aged 79)
- Resting place: Fairlawn Cemetery, Oklahoma City
- Party: Democratic Party
- Education: Randolph-Macon College

Charles Bingley Stuart was an American judge who served on the United States Court for the Indian Territory between 1893 and 1895.

== Early life and education ==
Charles Bingley Stuart was born on April 4, 1857, in Mecklenburg County, Virginia, to Virginia and John William Stuart. The family moved to Louisiana when he was young, but at sixteen he return to Virginia to attend Randolph-Macon College. After graduation he moved to Texas, read the law, and practiced in Texas. He married Blandina Cutliffe in 1884. Before his appointment to the bench, he partnered with his future successor William Yancey Lewis in Gainesville, Texas. He was a member of the Democratic Party.

== Judge for Indian Territory ==
President Grover Cleveland appointed Stuart to the United States Court for the Indian Territory to succeed James Shackelford and the Senate confirmed his nomination on March 27, 1893. In 1895, Congress separated the Court for the Indian Territory into three districts: the Northern, Central, and Southern. Stuart was assigned to the Central District. Later that year, he resigned and was succeeded by William Yancey Lewis. After he retired he returned to private practice where he would defend Phil Kennamer, the son of Judge Franklin Elmore Kennamer, during his murder trial and manage the estate of Charles Page. He was inducted into the Oklahoma Hall of Fame in 1933. He served as president of the Indian Territory Bar Association and later the Oklahoma Bar Association. He died on October 30, 1936, and was buried at Fairlawn Cemetery in Oklahoma City.
