= Samuel Morton Rutherford (Arkansas politician) =

American politician (1797–1867)

Treasurer of Arkansas Territory
- In office November 12, 1833 – October 1, 1836
- Preceded by: James Scull
- Succeeded by: William E. Woodruff (as State Treasurer)

Personal details
- Born: March 31, 1797 Virginia, U.S.
- Died: April 1, 1867 (aged 70) Fort Smith, Arkansas, U.S.
- Relatives: Samuel Morton Rutherford (grandson)

Samuel Morton Rutherford was an American politician who served as the Treasurer of Arkansas Territory from 1833 to 1836 and in the Arkansas General Assembly.

== Biography ==
Samuel Morton Rutherford was born on March 31, 1797, in Virginia. When he was 12, his family moved to Tennessee. In 1814, he enlisted in the United States Army to serve during the War of 1812 and he fought in the Battle of New Orleans. He retired from the army in 1817 and moved to the mouth of the Verdigris River.

In 1819, he moved to Arkansas Territory. He served as the Treasurer of Arkansas Territory, as registrar of the land office, Superintendent of Indian Affairs West of the Mississippi River, Fort Smith Judge, and as a trustee for the University of Arkansas. He was the first representative elected from Sebastian County, Arkansas to the Arkansas General Assembly. In 1859, he was a member of the commission who organized Seminole removal. He died in Fort Smith, Arkansas, on April 1, 1867. His grandson, also named Samuel Morton Rutherford, was active in politics in Indian Territory and Oklahoma.

== Works cited ==
- Rand, Jerry (Summer 1952). "Samuel Morton Rutherford" (PDF). Chronicles of Oklahoma. 30 (2): 149–159.
