= Colusa County Superior Court =

California superior court with jurisdiction over Colusa County

Superior Court of California, County of Colusa
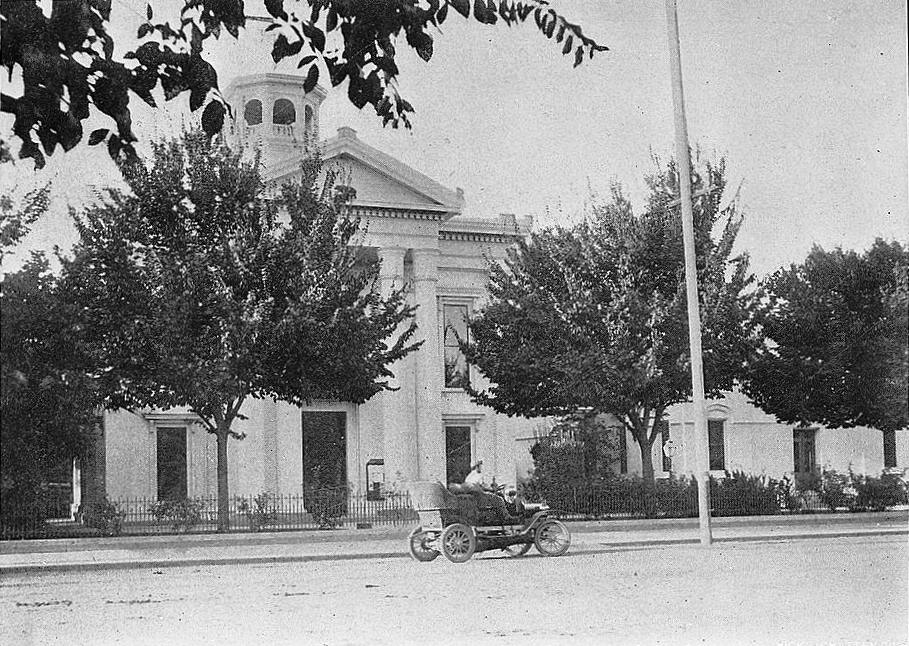
- Colusa County Superior Court, historic 1861 courthouse (photographed in 1908)
- Interactive map of Superior Court of California, County of Colusa
- 39.21385°N 122.00899°W
- Established: 1850
- Jurisdiction: Colusa County, California
- Location: Colusa
- Coordinates: 39.21385°N 122.00899°W
- Appeals to: California Court of Appeal for the Third District
- Website: colusa.courts.ca.gov

Presiding Judge
- Currently: Hon. Brendan Michael Farrell

Assistant Presiding Judge
- Currently: Hon. Luke Steidlmayer

Court Executive Officer
- Currently: Erika F. Valencia

The Superior Court of California, County of Colusa, informally the Colusa County Superior Court, is the California superior court with jurisdiction over Colusa County.

== History ==
Colusa County was one of the original counties formed (as "Colusi County") when California gained statehood in 1850. The spelling was modified in 1856.

The county government center was at the Monroe House prior to the county seat's move from Monroeville to Colusi in 1853; after the move, a two-storey wooden courthouse was built on Market Street in Colusa in 1854, near the present-day site of the courthouse completed in 1861. Charles D. Semple donated most of the land for the 1861 courthouse in the vain hopes that his tax bill would be forgiven. It is the third-oldest county courthouse in California, after the Mariposa (1854) and Trinity (1857) county courthouses.

== Venues ==
Primary court operations are held in the Court's annex (532 Oak Street), one block south of the historic courthouse (547 Market Street). The annex handles all criminal trials, while the historic courthouse handles civil, family law, probate, and traffic cases.
