= Glenn County Superior Court =

California superior court with jurisdiction over Glenn Country

Superior Court of California, County of Glenn
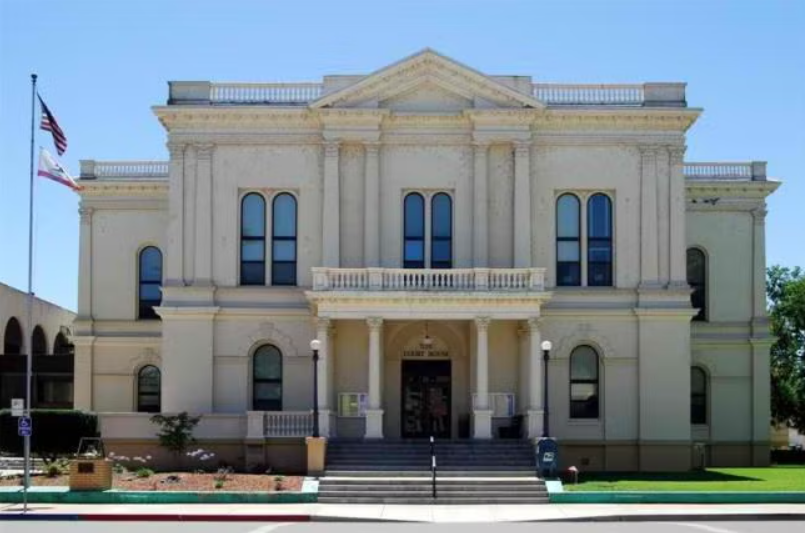
- Interactive map of Superior Court of California, County of Glenn
- 39.52018°N 122.20027°W
- Established: 1891
- Jurisdiction: Glenn County, California
- Location: Willows
- Coordinates: 39.52018°N 122.20027°W
- Appeals to: California Court of Appeal for the Third District
- Website: www.glenn.courts.ca.gov

Presiding Judge
- Currently: Hon. Donald Cole Byrd

Court Executive Officer
- Currently: Chris Ruhl
- Since: Jan 29, 2024

The Superior Court of California, County of Glenn, informally the Glenn County Superior Court, is the California superior court with jurisdiction over Glenn County.

== History ==
Glenn County was formed in 1891, partitioned from neighboring Colusa County.

The Glenn County Courthouse was completed in 1894 for the county seat in Willows; after the dome was damaged by an earthquake, it was removed in 1951. The dome was added at the request of county supervisors, who were concerned about rumors the contractor would go bankrupt before finishing the buildings. The courthouse was designed by John Curtis, who also designed the Placer County Courthouse. An annex was added in 1968, designed by Alvin Fingado and George T. Kern.

Because of the small population of the county, the superior court has two judges and one child support commissioner (under Assembly Bill 1058). After Hon. Peter Billiou Twede retired in 2018, Governor Jerry Brown appointed Hon. Alicia Ekland to the bench; she is the first female judge to serve Glenn County.

Construction started in December 2018 for a two-story annex behind the existing historic courthouse in Willows, replacing three single-story additions built in the 1940s. The existing courthouse has 15,798 ft (4,815 m) of space; when the new annex is complete, that will expand to 41,867 ft^{2} (3,889.6 m^{2}) and the Orland Branch will close, consolidating court operations in Willows. During construction, operations in Willows were moved temporarily to the Willows Memorial Hall.

== Venues ==
Glenn County Superior Court locations:
1 Main, 526 W Sycamore (Willows)
2 Orland, 821 E South

Aside from the main courthouse in Willows, the superior court operates a branch courthouse in Orland, the county's largest city.
