= Del Norte County Superior Court =

California superior court with jurisdiction over Del Norte Country

Superior Court of California, County of Del Norte
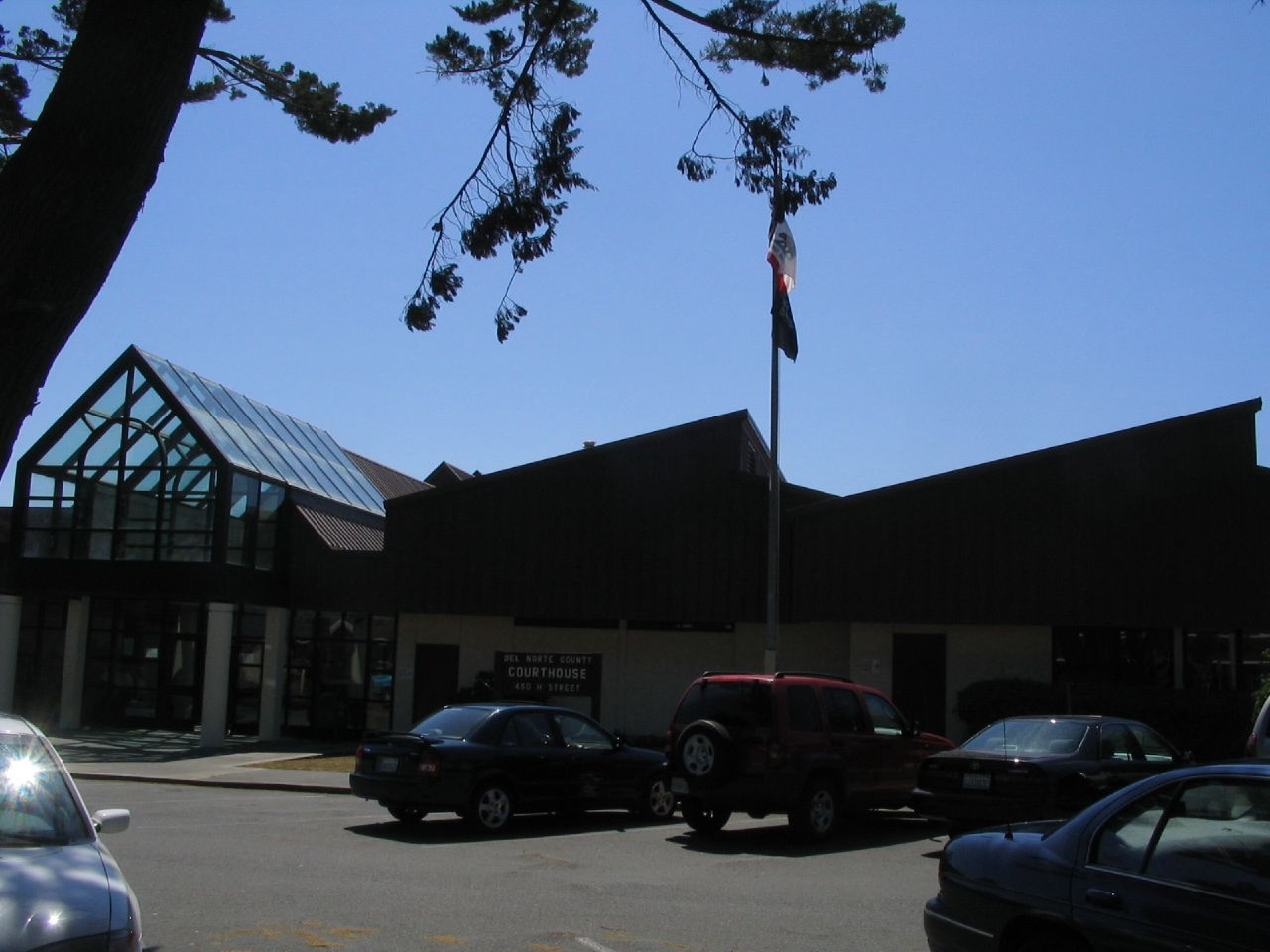
- 1958 Del Norte County Courthouse (photographed in 2006)
- Interactive map of Superior Court of California, County of Del Norte
- 41.7529°N 124.1994°W
- Established: 1857
- Jurisdiction: Del Norte County, California
- Location: Crescent City
- Coordinates: 41.7529°N 124.1994°W
- Appeals to: California Court of Appeal for the First District
- Website: delnorte.courts.ca.gov

Presiding Judge
- Currently: Hon. Darren McElfresh

Court Executive Officer
- Currently: Lesley Plunkett-Field

The Superior Court of California, County of Del Norte, informally the Del Norte County Superior Court, is the California superior court with jurisdiction over Del Norte County.

== History ==
Del Norte County was formed in 1857, partitioned from the now-dissolved Klamath County, with Crescent City named as the county seat.

The first purpose-built courthouse was constructed between 1879 and 1884 at a total cost of US$18,000 (equivalent to $630,000 in 2024). It was destroyed by fire in the early morning of January 18, 1948. The architect for the 1884 courthouse was S.P. Marsh.

Court operations were temporarily moved to the Veterans Memorial Hall in Crescent City until the current replacement courthouse was built in 1958 to a design by William Mabry Van Fleet. As designed, the 1958 courthouse has 20,760 square feet (1,929 m^{2}) of floor space.
