= Yuba County Superior Court =

California superior court with jurisdiction over Yuba County

Superior Court of California, County of Yuba
- Interactive map of Superior Court of California, County of Yuba
- 39.1411°N 121.5872°W
- Established: 1850
- Jurisdiction: Yuba County, California
- Location: Marysville
- Coordinates: 39.1411°N 121.5872°W
- Appeals to: California Court of Appeal for the Third District
- Website: yuba.courts.ca.gov

Presiding Judge
- Currently: Hon. Debra L. Givens

Assistant Presiding Judge
- Currently: Hon. Benjamin Z. Wirtschafter

Court Executive Officer
- Currently: Heather Pugh
- Since: Jan 1, 2022

The Superior Court of California, County of Yuba, informally known as the Yuba County Superior Court, is the California superior court with jurisdiction over Yuba County.

== History ==
Yuba County was one of the original counties formed in 1850 when California gained statehood.

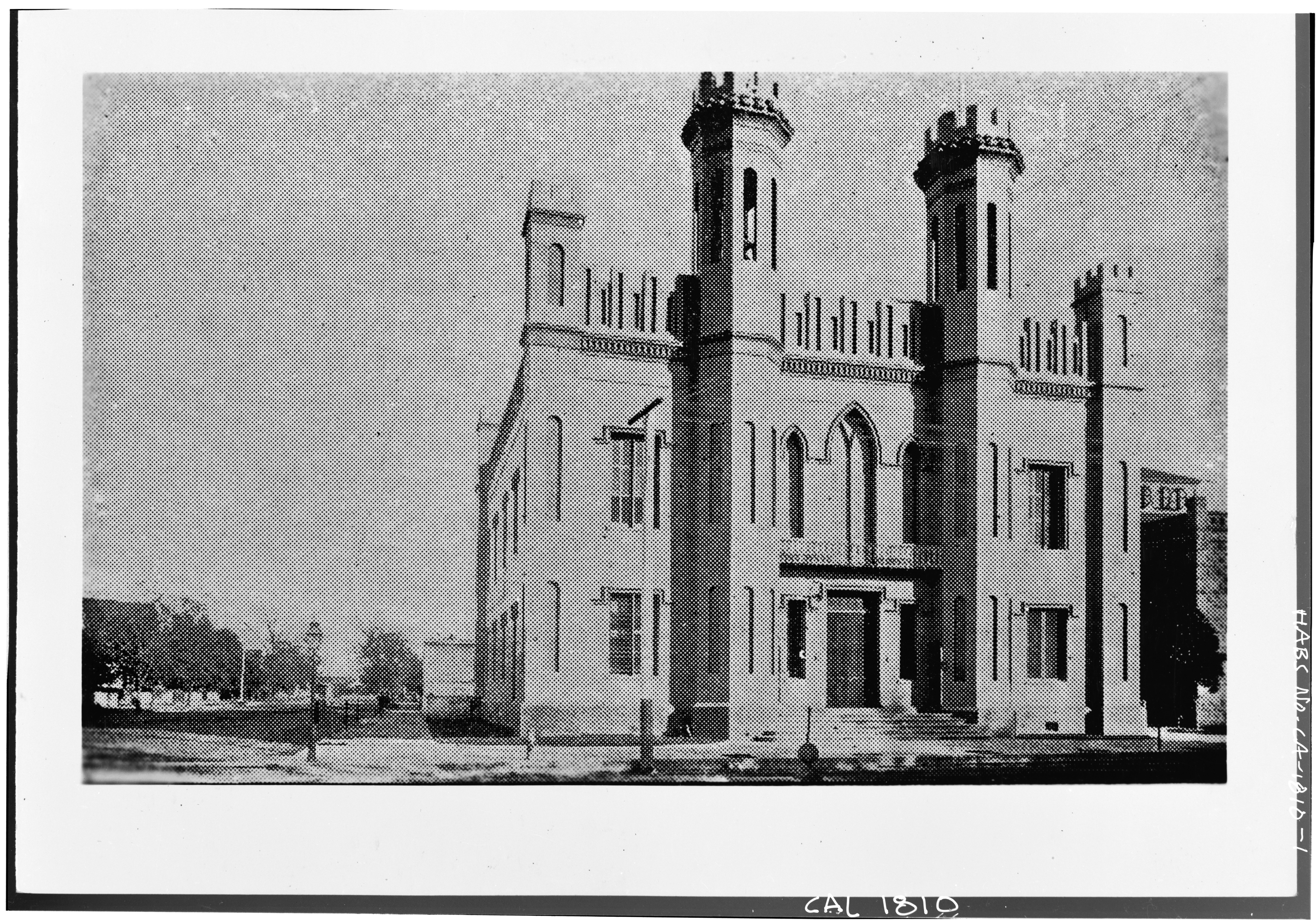
1855 courthouse (photographed c.1905)

Court was originally held in a canvas structure erected at E and Third in 1850, containing a single room 20 by 30 feet (6.1 by 9.1 m) in size, and a second story used as a Masonic hall. The Court of Sessions appropriated US$6,000 (equivalent to $227,000 in 2024) to purchase the St. Charles Hotel at D and Third, allocating an additional US$500 to repair it with canvas partitions. A permanent courthouse was completed in 1855, modeled after the United States Army Corps of Engineers logo, at D and Sixth with an estimated cost of US$45,000 (equivalent to $1,519,000 in 2024). The 1855 courthouse was replaced by a new facility in 1962 and demolished in 1963.

Court is currently held in the 1962 building.
