= Butte County Superior Court =

California superior court with jurisdiction over Butte County

Superior Court of California, County of Butte
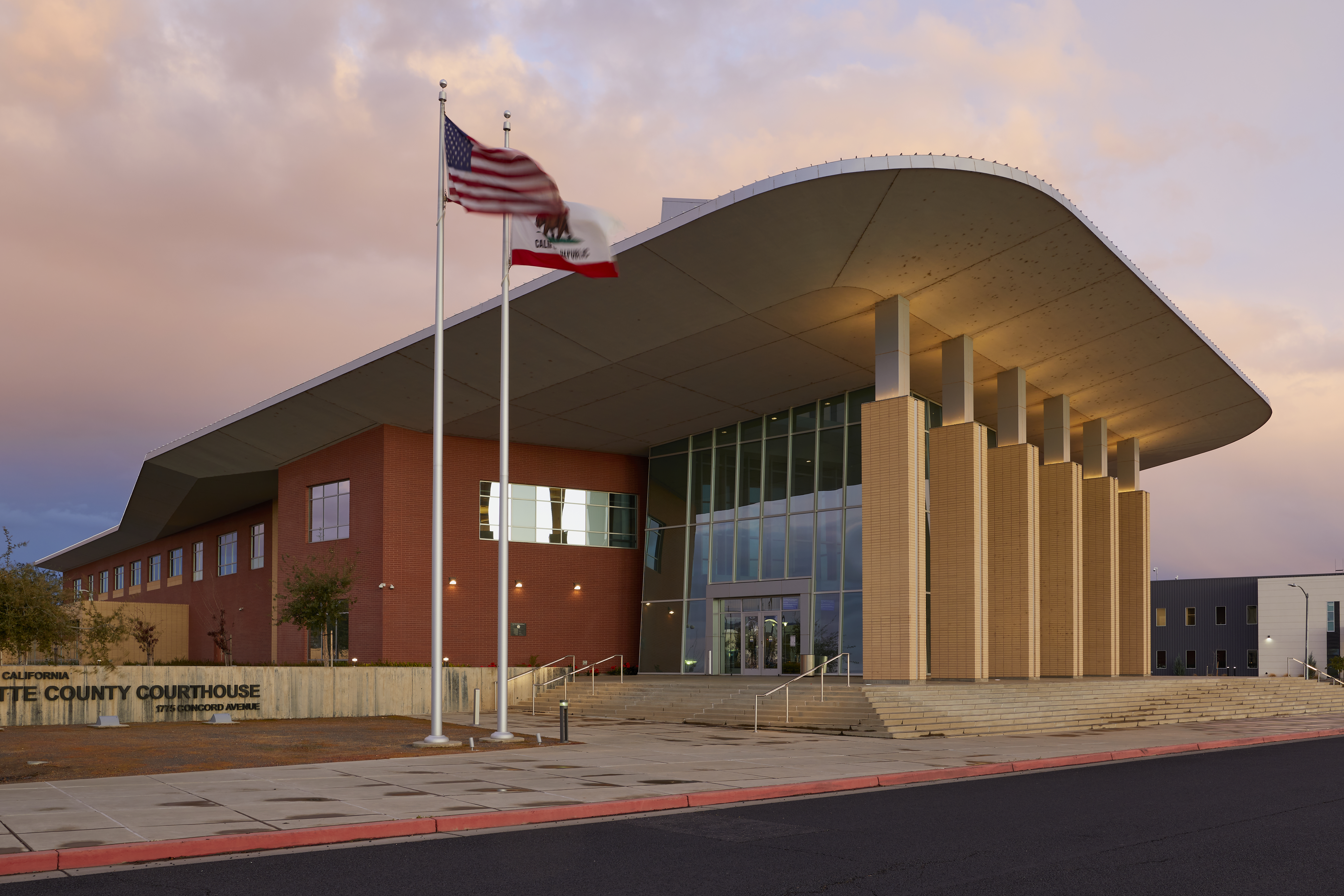
- North Butte County Courthouse, in Chico, California (2020)
- Established: 1850
- Jurisdiction: Butte County, California
- Location: North: Chico; Main: Oroville
- Appeals to: California Court of Appeal for the Third District
- Website: buttecourt.ca.gov

Presiding Judge
- Currently: Hon. Michael R. Deems

Court Executive Officer
- Currently: Sharif Elmallah

The Superior Court of California, County of Butte, informally the Butte County Superior Court, is the California superior court with jurisdiction over Butte County.

== History ==
Butte County was one of the original counties formed in 1850 when California became a state.

The main Butte County Courthouse was built in 1856 at 1859 Bird Street in Oroville; it was remodeled in 1919 and 1951 and is occupied by the Butte County Department of Education. Bricks from the original courthouse were used to construct a marker in Bicentennial Park. Court operations moved to the new County Center at 25 Court Street in 1979, and then to the new County Courthouse in 1996.

Satellite locations were added in 1961 (Paradise) and 1966 (Chico) in new one- and two-room courthouses, respectively. Court operations were consolidated from Paradise to Chico in 2009. Even though most County residents lived outside Oroville, the Butte County Courthouse was forced to handle all criminal and family law cases, and juries were selected in Oroville even if the trial would proceed in Chico.

The 1966 Chico Courthouse at 655 Oleander Avenue was overcrowded and portions were not accessible as required by the Americans with Disabilities Act, so land for a new North Butte County Courthouse was acquired in 2010–11 and the new 65,096-square-foot (6,047.6 m^{2}) building was built, with court operations commencing at the new building on March 23, 2015. The total cost of the project was US$65 million. Butte County made plans to purchase the 655 Oleander property in 2018 from the Superior Courts of California, a state agency.

== Venues ==
Butte County Superior Court locations:
1 North County Courthouse, 1775 Concord Ave (Chico)
2 Main Courthouse, One Court St (Oroville)
3 Paradise Courthouse, 747 Elliott Rd (Paradise)
4 Chico Courthouse, 655 Oleander Ave (Chico)

Butte County Superior Court has two venues, divided geographically. The North Butte County Courthouse is in Chico and serves the majority of the county's population, while the main courthouse is in the county seat of Oroville.

The new North County Courthouse in Chico, completed in 2015, consolidated operations from a small satellite courthouse in Paradise and an older courthouse in Chico. Court proceedings in Paradise had stopped in October 2009, and the last day of counter service in Paradise was September 30, 2011.
