= Criminal procedure in California =

The state of California in the United States follows common law criminal procedure. The principal source of law for California criminal procedure is the California Penal Code, Part 2, "Of Criminal Procedure." Not all cases end up with a trial and are instead resolved by a plea bargain or dismissed by a judge. If a case results in a trial, it doesn't always follow each step of the criminal procedure.

With a population of about 40 million people, in California every year there are approximately:

- 166 thousand violent crimes and one million property crimes committed
- 1.5 million arrests made
- 270,000 felony cases, 900,000 misdemeanor cases, and 5 million infraction cases heard by the California superior courts

There are currently 130,000 people in state prisons and 70,000 people in county jails. Of these, there are 746 people who have been sentenced to death.

== Arrest ==
The first step in criminal procedure is for the defendant to be arrested by the police. In California, the police may arrest a person:

- Misdemeanor Crime: if the police have probable cause, witnessed the crime being committed, or have a signed arrest warrant from a judge
- Felony Crime: if the police have probable cause, a statement from a witness, or a signed arrest warrant from a judge

If the police are claiming that they have an arrest warrant, the defendant can demand to be shown it. If the police do not have the warrant with them at the time, they can still make the arrest, but they must show the warrant to the defendant "as soon as practicable."

=== Citation instead of arrest ===
Instead of arrest the police may choose to issue a citation (i.e. "notice to appear in court") with the condition that the person assures (in writing) they will appear in court and isn't a threat to the public. The effect is the same as arrest; if the defendant fails to show up in court for their scheduled arraignment, the judge will issue an arrest warrant.

=== Search ===
Before or after an arrest is made, the police may search a person or their property if they have a search warrant. The search warrant must clearly indicate what the police plan to search (person or property) and what they are authorized to take in as evidence connected to a crime. There are a few exceptions that can occur in which a search is made without proper documentation; however there are protections in place to prevent the police from performing involuntary searches.

=== Interrogation ===
To interrogate the defendant, the police must first read the Miranda warning to the defendant, advising them of their rights. However, an individual may plead the Fifth in order to not self-incriminate when asked questions by the police.

=== Pre-trial custody ===
Upon arrest, the police will take the defendant to the local (city or county) pre-trial jail. This differs from state prison. Prison is for defendants that have been convicted of a crime after a trial and are now serving their sentence. After taking the defendant to jail, the police may decide to release the defendant with a notice-to-appear in court for their arraignment.

== Arraignment ==
After arresting the defendant, the police are required by law to bring the defendant to court within 48 hours (excluding court holidays) for the arraignment hearing. The arraignment is a very short court hearing. At the arraignment, the judge will:

1. Read what charges the District attorney has filed in court against the defendant (e.g. "You have been charged with violation of Section 243 of the Penal Code, Battery.") If the DA decides not to file charges against the defendant, then the defendant is set free. The judge may ask the defendant if they waive their right to hear the charges. If the defendant agrees to waive their right to hear the charges, the judge won't read what the defendant has been charged with.
2. Set the amount of money required for bail. By paying the bail bond, the defendant is released from jail, and the court will eventually provide the bail money back to the defendant as long as they continue coming to court. Bail is required to ensure the defendant will come back to court if they are released. When there is either a public safety risk (e.g. accusations of violent crime) or a risk that the defendant won't show up to court (e.g. the defendant has a history of not showing up to court), the judge will deny bail and require the defendant to stay in custody. Bail is initially set according to the bail schedule but can be adjusted depending on individual circumstances, such as income. It is also possible that the judge will allow the defendant to leave jail without any bail (i.e. "released on recognizance") if the judge has strong confidence the defendant will show up to court and has no threat to the local community. The judge will also consider if the defendant has any local ties to the community. For this reason, it may be helpful if the defendant's family and/or friends attend the arraignment so the judge may take their presence into consideration.
3. Inform the defendant of their rights, including their right to a criminal defense lawyer. If the defendant cannot afford to hire a defense attorney, the judge will refer the defendant to the public defender. At the trial level, California public defense systems are designed and funded by counties, which may use a public defender office, contract attorneys, or a managed assigned counsel system.
4. Ask if the defendant would like to plead guilty, not guilty, or no contest. The defendant can ask to enter a plea later so that they don't have to decide right away. The district attorney will frequently offer a plea bargain.

== Preliminary examination ==
Before a felony may be prosecuted by information, a magistrate ordinarily holds a preliminary examination; a represented defendant may waive it. The examination determines whether a public offense has been committed and whether sufficient cause exists to believe the defendant guilty. If sufficient cause exists, the magistrate holds the defendant to answer; otherwise, the complaint is dismissed and the defendant is discharged.

== Pre-trial ==
=== Setting the date for trial ===
Defendants in California have the following statutory Speedy Trial rights.

- To have their trial begin within 60 days of their arraignment if charged with a felony
- To have their trial begin within 30 days of their arraignment if charged with a misdemeanor and they are in custody of the police (i.e. in jail)
- To have their trial begin with 45 days of their arraignment if charged with a misdemeanor and they are out of custody of the police (i.e. out of jail)

These rights exists for several reasons. Most importantly, they exist to ensure defendants do not stay in jail for months and years waiting for a trial.

Defendants are frequently asked if they would like to waive their speedy trial rights. To waive a right means to give it up. One reason why the defendant may want to waive their speedy trial rights is so that they can have time perform their own investigation by an independent third-party which may produce different results from the investigation done by the police. The results of the third-party investigation can then be presented at trial to the jury.

=== Discovery ===
Discovery is the process of exchanging documents between the district attorney and the defense attorney that may contain evidence. In California, the district attorney is required to turn over everything they plan to present at trial at least 30 days ahead of time, as well as any evidence that might help the defendant show that they are innocent (see Brady disclosure). The defense attorney is not required to give incriminating evidence to the district attorney, but must also turn over whatever they plan to present at trial at least 30 days ahead of time.

=== New public defender ===
If the defendant is having a problem with the public defender and would like a new one, they can tell the court they are making a "Marsden motion." The court will then have a special hearing, called a Marsden hearing, where the district attorney is not allowed to be in the room. There, the defendant can explain how the Public Defender is not being helpful and the judge can decide if the defendant should be given a new attorney.

=== Self-representation ===
A defendant may choose to act as their own attorney by making a Faretta motion. This should be done as early as possible because making such a motion close to the trial date gives cause for the judge to deny the motion.

== Trial ==
=== Jury selection ===
During jury selection, prospective jurors may be challenged for cause, including actual or implied bias. Each side also has peremptory challenges, which are distinct from challenges for cause and may not be used on the basis of race, ethnicity, gender, gender identity, sexual orientation, national origin, or religious affiliation. Each side has 10 peremptory challenges in a trial for an offense other than one punishable by death or life imprisonment or one punishable by no more than 90 days; different numbers apply to those categories and when multiple defendants are tried together. The jury is sworn after both sides pass consecutively. A court may select one or more alternate jurors; one alternate is not required in every case.

=== Opening statements ===
Since the defendant is assumed innocent until proven guilty, the district attorney has the burden of proving their case, so they make the first opening statement that summarizes the evidence they will present at trial. They summarize their point of view of what happened and why they believe the jury should find the defendant to be guilty of the crimes charged. The defense attorney can then make their opening statement, or choose to reserve their opening statement until the district attorney rests their case.

=== Prosecution's case ===
The prosecution calls all the witnesses one by one. Witnesses are not allowed to sit in the courtroom, and must wait outside until they are called to testify on the stand. Each time the district attorney calls a witness for direct examination, the defense attorney is allowed to ask questions as well of the same witness as part of cross-examination.

After the district attorney has called all their witnesses and presented all of their evidence, the district attorney announces they rest their case. This means they are finished explaining why they think the defendant is guilty. The prosecution must prove their case beyond reasonable doubt. This means the evidence must be so convincing that there is no doubt left in the minds of the jury that the defendant is guilty and that the only way for them to doubt the evidence is to make "unreasonable" assumptions. (i.e. maybe aliens from Mars put the murder weapon in the defendant's car.) It is the highest standard of proof used in American law.

=== Defense's case ===
The defense attorney then calls all of their witnesses. The defense attorney can call new witnesses as well as witnesses that the district attorney called. After the defense attorney asks questions to the witness as part of direct examination, the district attorney can also ask them questions as part of cross-examination. The defense attorney's strategy will be either to undermine the district attorney's claims (i.e. say that the DA has failed to prove their case by poking holes in their theory and undermining the credibility of the witnesses and evidence) or to present an "affirmative defense" (i.e. actively prove the defendant is innocent by introducing their own evidence, such as a video showing the defendant was out of town when the crime happened.) The defense attorney could also do both.

=== Defendant's testimony ===
The defendant has the absolute right to take the stand as a witness to testify (in self-defense) or not testify (avoid self-incrimination) at trial. The defendant's decision on this issue is of such importance that it cannot be overridden by a competing interest. (i.e. No matter what arguments are made by the DA or even the defense attorney, the defendant's choice to testify or not testify must be honored.)

=== Closing statements ===
Each side then summarizes what happened during the trial and their final thoughts as to why the jury should vote guilty or not guilty.

=== Jury deliberation ===
The jury is sent into a private room where they deliberate. All 12 jurors must vote guilty in order to convict the defendant.

=== Verdict ===
After the jury reaches a verdict, they return to the courtroom and the court clerk announces the verdict.

== Sentencing ==
If the verdict is guilty, the judge gives the sentence for the crime. Criminal sentences can include any of the following, depending on the particular crime:

- Fine
- Restitution
- Restraining Order
- Imprisonment
- Death

=== Probation ===
After deciding on a sentence, the court may also put the defendant on probation, especially if it is the defendant's first criminal conviction, the crime itself was not very serious, and the defendant's behavior indicates they have learned from the experience. When granted probation, the imposition of the sentence on the defendant is suspended and the defendant does not have to pay the fine or become imprisoned as long as they comply with the terms of their probation as set by the judge. Probation terms may include obligations to perform community service. If the terms of the probation are violated, the court can then impose the original sentence.

== Appeal ==
In California, criminal defendants have the right to appeal both felony and misdemeanor convictions. If the defendant is convicted of a misdemeanor, they have the right to be released on bail pending the outcome of their appeal.

Misdemeanor appeals are heard by the Appellate Division of the California Superior Court. Felony appeals are heard by the California Court of Appeal. Appeals from judgements of death are heard by the California Supreme Court.
