= Inyo County Superior Court =

California superior court with jurisdiction over Inyo Country

Superior Court of California, County of Inyo
- 1921 Inyo County Courthouse (Independence), photographed by Carol Highsmith in 2012
- Established: 1866
- Jurisdiction: Inyo County, California
- Location: Bishop; Independence (county seat)
- Appeals to: California Court of Appeal for the Fourth District, Division Two
- Website: inyo.courts.ca.gov

Presiding Judge
- Currently: Hon. Stephen M. Place

Court Executive Officer
- Currently: Pamela M. Foster

The Superior Court of California, County of Inyo, informally the Inyo County Superior Court, is the California superior court with jurisdiction over Inyo County.

== History ==
Inyo County was formed in 1866 after a failed effort to establish Coso County; Coso had been partitioned from Mono and Tulare Counties in 1864.

Shortly after Coso County was formed in 1864, the county seat was set in Bend City and Governor Frederick Low offered the position of county judge to Dr. S. G. George, who declined it; local citizens favored Oscar L. Matthews, but Low did not appoint him. The Owens Valley War was ongoing and further efforts to organize the nascent county failed. When Inyo County was formed in 1866, Independence was named the county seat; Matthews was appointed County Judge by Low, and never sentenced a felon during his term. Following the election of 1867, A. C. Hanson succeeded Matthews as County Judge, and Theron Reed won District Judge. Hanson would serve as county judge until 1871, succeeded by John A. Hannah (1872–80); the position was renamed to Superior Judge in 1880 and Judge Hannah continued serving until 1890; he was succeeded by George M. Gill (1891–96), Walter A. Lamar (1897–1908) and William D. Dehy (1909 to at least 1922).

A two-storey fired brick courthouse in Independence was built at a cost of $9,832 and accepted on February 1, 1869, but it was destroyed three years later by an earthquake on March 26, 1872. E. Chaquette won the contract to build a new timber-framed courthouse for $15,900 in September 1872, but he was delayed by an epizootic horse disease, and the new courthouse was not accepted until July 3, 1873.

The 1873 courthouse was lost in a fire that started in a vacant building on June 30, 1886, and burned much of central Independence; two ladies are credited with saving the county records by ferrying books and documents to safety. Following the fire, a petition was started to move the county seat to Bishop, which the county board of supervisors denied; instead, a contract was let to M. E. Gilmore on October 7 for $11,458, and the new courthouse was accepted on February 10, 1887. The credited architect was W. N. Cancannoh.

On June 10, 1919, after receiving a reimbursement from the state, the county board of supervisors unanimously adopted a resolution calling for a new fireproof courthouse in the interest of protecting its records. The fourth courthouse in Independence was constructed between 1920 and 1921, designed by William H. Weeks in the Neoclassical Revival style to resist fire and earthquakes, which had destroyed prior courthouses. The construction contract was awarded to the McCombs brothers of Bishop in April 1920 for $158,700. The new courthouse was accepted on November 8, 1921, and dedicated on April 10, 1922; a crowd estimated at 600–700 people attended the ceremony, which included an address from Governor Stephens. As completed, the courthouse includes a plaque dedicated to the World War I casualties from Inyo County. The 1922 courthouse was added to the National Register of Historic Places in 1998.

An annex for the 1922 courthouse was completed in 1965 to a design by Calvin W Goss and Allan Kinn Choy, the brother of Eugene Kinn Choy. The former Bishop Grammar School (completed in 1914 to a design by Charles Wonacott) was converted to a courthouse in 1974 and renamed the Bishop Civic Center. Both locations, in Independence and Bishop, are still in use today.

== Venues ==
Inyo County Superior Court locations:
1 301 W Line St (Bishop)
2 168 N Edwards St (Independence)

With two judges, the presiding judge of the Inyo County Superior Court is the senior member of the bench. Court is held in two locations: Independence, the county seat, and Bishop, the largest city.
