= Humboldt County Superior Court =

California superior court with jurisdiction over Humboldt Country

Superior Court of California, County of Humboldt
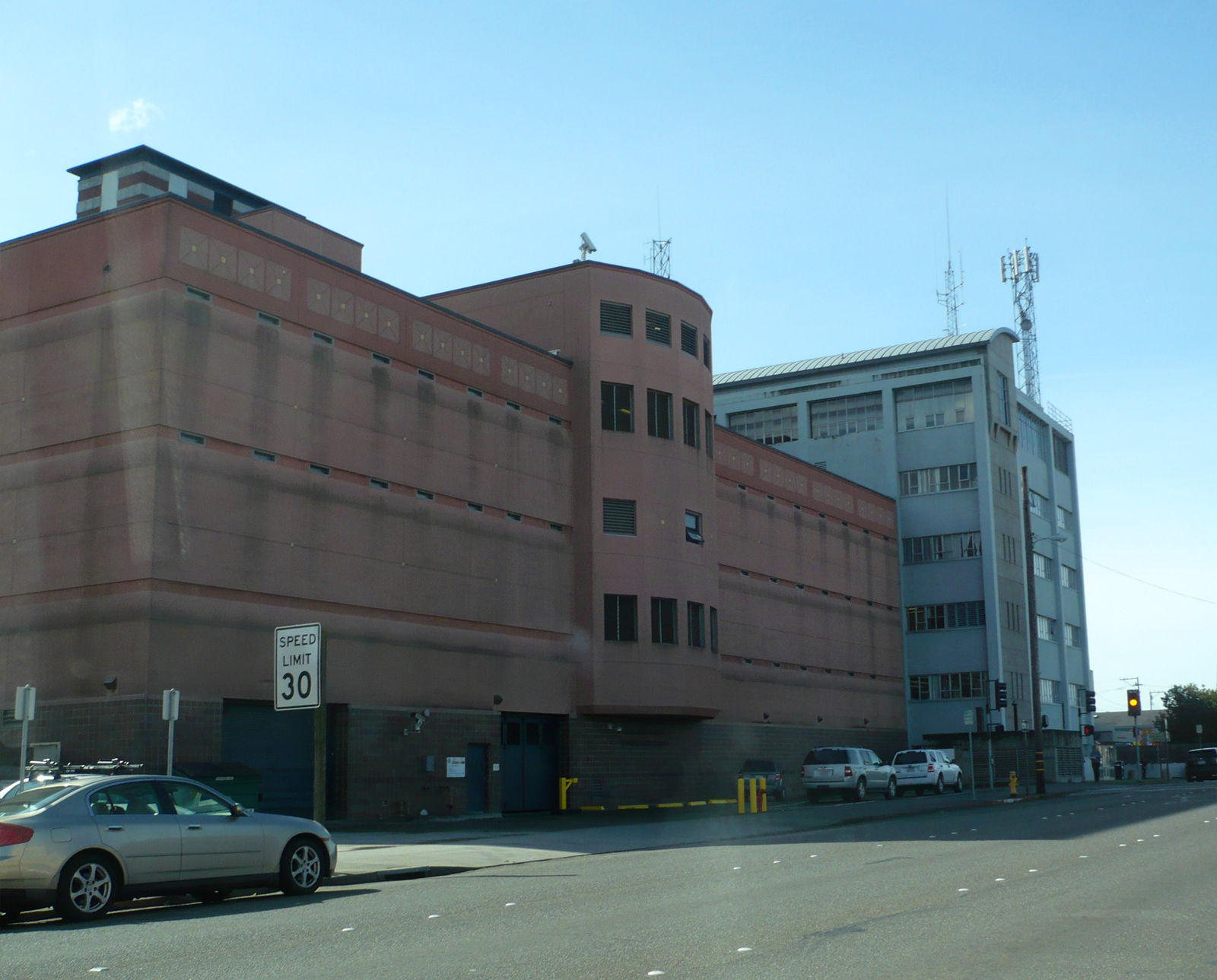
- Humboldt County Jail and Courthouse
- Interactive map of Superior Court of California, County of Humboldt
- 40.8030°N 124.1620°W
- Established: 1853
- Jurisdiction: Humboldt County, California
- Location: Eureka
- Coordinates: 40.8030°N 124.1620°W
- Appeals to: California Court of Appeal for the Third District
- Website: humboldt.courts.ca.gov

Presiding Judge
- Currently: Hon. Joyce D. Hinrichs

Assistant Presiding Judge
- Currently: Hon. Gregory Elvine-Kreis

Court Executive Officer
- Currently: Kim Bartleson

The Superior Court of California, County of Humboldt, informally the Humboldt County Superior Court, is the California superior court with jurisdiction over Humboldt County.

== History ==
Humboldt County Superior Court locations:
1 825 Fifth Street (Main Eureka Courthouse)
2 2004 Harrison Ave (Juvenile Justice)
3 483 Conger Street (Eel River Justice Court, Garberville, closed)
4 Highway 96 (Klamath-Trinity Justice Court, Hoopa, closed)
5 777 9th Street (Eel River Justice Court, Fortuna, closed)
6 4605 Valley West Blvd. (North Humboldt Justice Court, Arcata, closed)

Humboldt County was formed in 1853 from parts of Trinity County. The city of Eureka is the county seat.

The first purpose-built county courthouse was completed in Eureka in 1889 at the corner of 3rd Street and G Street, and survived a fire in 1924.

The design was credited to architect J.M. Curtis. It was condemned and demolished in 1956. The current courthouse was built in 1956 along with a new jail on the block encompassed by 4th, 5th, I and J Streets. In 1994 and 1995, a new jail was built as an addition on courthouse covering J Street. In 1995, the Humboldt County District Attorney's Office moved into the remodeled old jail.
