= Stanislaus County Superior Court =

California superior court with jurisdiction over Stanislaus Country

Superior Court of California, County of Stanislaus
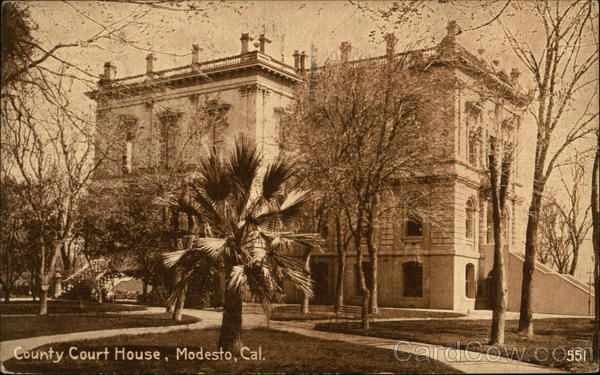
- 1873 courthouse
- Interactive map of Superior Court of California, County of Stanislaus
- 37.6399°N 120.9974°W
- Established: 1854
- Jurisdiction: Stanislaus County, California
- Location: Modesto
- Coordinates: 37.6399°N 120.9974°W
- Appeals to: California Court of Appeal for the Fifth District
- Website: stanislaus.courts.ca.gov

Presiding Judge
- Currently: Hon. Sonny S. Sandhu

Assistant Presiding Judge
- Currently: Hon. Kellee C. Westbrook

Court Executive Officer
- Currently: Hugh K. Swift

The Superior Court of California, County of Stanislaus, informally known as the Stanislaus County Superior Court, is the California superior court with jurisdiction over Stanislaus County.

== History ==
Stanislaus County was formed in 1854, partitioned from neighboring Tuolumne County.

The first county seat was Adamsville, selected by a vote held June 10, 1854; the county seat was moved up the Tuolumne River to Empire City that November, then La Grange in the December 20, 1855 election. In La Grange, a frame house was purchased from John Meyers for $1700 to serve as the courthouse. After a portion of San Joaquin County was annexed to Stanislaus, Knights Ferry won a close election for the county seat in 1861, and court was held in a two-story brick building over the next 11 years. The new city of Modesto (originally intended to be named for William Chapman Ralston) was founded in 1870 as the southern terminus of the Central Pacific Railroad, which bypassed the river towns by extending its line from Lathrop; it soon became the most populous in the county, and assumed the county seat following a vote in 1871.

In Modesto, a temporary courthouse was set up at Eighth and I, then moved to the upper floor of the Easton Building (or Eastin's Hotel), which had a saloon on the first floor where "the judge and jury could get refreshments". A permanent building was constructed from 1872 to 1873 on land donated by the railroad; it was designed by Albert A. Bennett, with the ground floor entrance facing H Street. It was expanded in 1904, but the Modesto Herald noted "in comparison with the beautiful modern buildings that may be seen in other counties it is not especially attractive"; a grand jury's report in 1921 concluded a new courthouse was needed. Court operations moved to the Hall of Records in 1939 (at 1100 I St), and the old courthouse was demolished in 1958 to clear space for the current county offices.

The current main court house (800 11th St) was dedicated on April 23, 1960, and criticized as a "large undistinguished box". It was designed by Mitchell Van Bourg & Associates.

== Venues ==
Stanislaus County Superior Court locations:
1 Main, 800 11th St
City Towers (Civil), 801 10th St
2 Turlock (satellite), 300 Starr Ave
3 Traffic, 2260 Floyd Ave
4 Juvenile, 2215 Blue Gum Ave

Court services are held in several locations, depending on the case type. The main courthouse in downtown Modesto handles criminal and family law. The nearby City Towers courthouse handles civil lawsuits and probate matters. There is a satellite courthouse in Turlock, handling small claims and unlawful detainers. Traffic and Juvenile matters are handled in separate buildings within Modesto.
