= Kings County Superior Court =

California superior court with jurisdiction over Kings County

Superior Court of California, County of Kings
- Interactive map of Superior Court of California, County of Kings
- 36.3333°N 119.6714°W
- Established: 1893
- Jurisdiction: Kings County, California
- Location: Hanford
- Coordinates: 36.3333°N 119.6714°W
- Appeals to: California Court of Appeal for the Fifth District
- Website: kings.courts.ca.gov

Presiding Judge
- Currently: Hon. Jennifer Giuliani

Assistant Presiding Judge
- Currently: Hon. Kathy Ciuffini

Court Executive Officer
- Currently: Nocona Soboleski

The Superior Court of California, County of Kings, informally the Kings County Superior Court, is the California superior court with jurisdiction over Kings County.

== History ==
Kings County was partitioned from Tulare County in 1893; the county seat was established at Hanford.

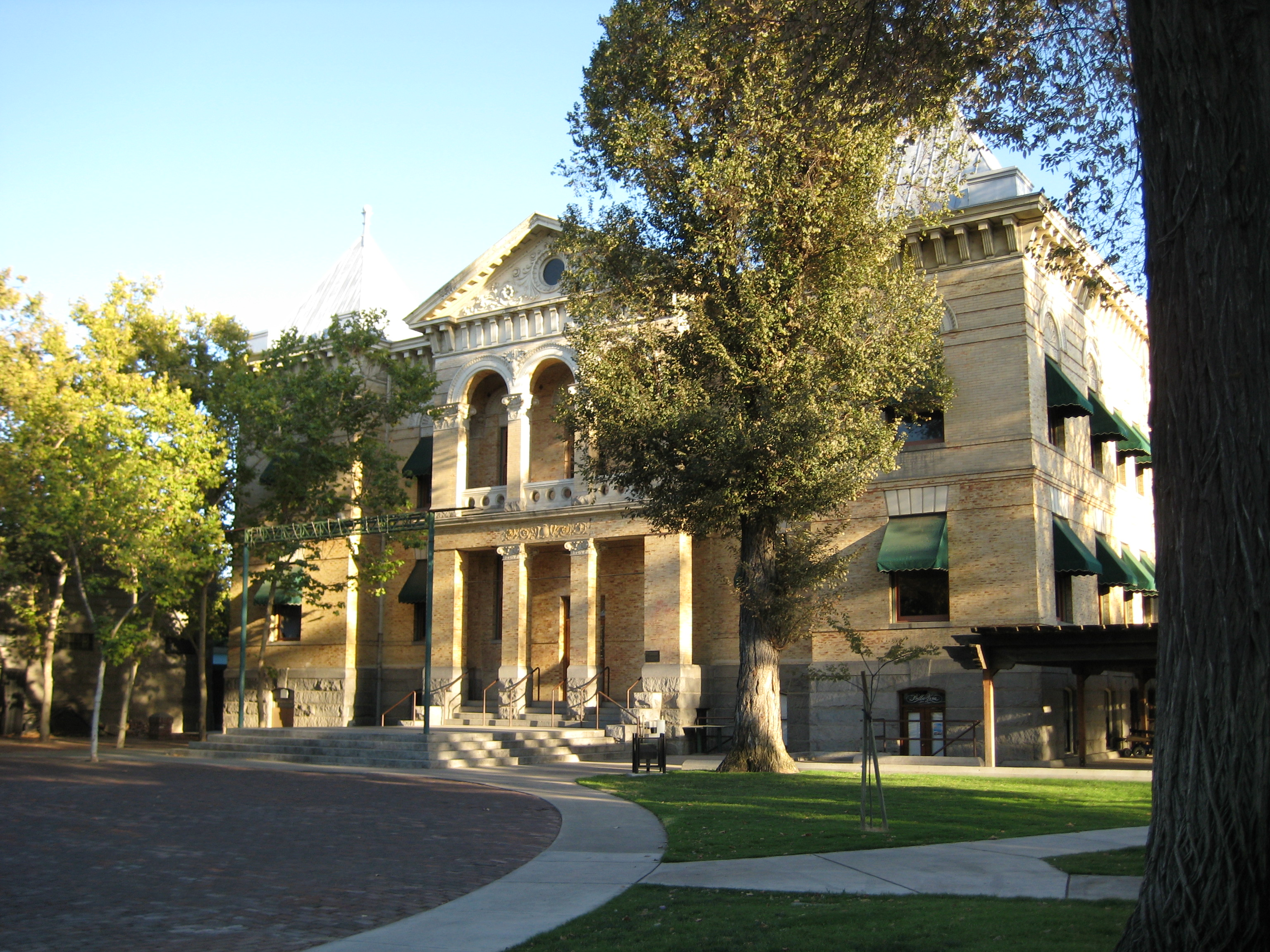
1896/1914 Kings County Courthouse in Hanford, California (2007)

Court was initially held in a space leased in the local opera house; the superior court was moved to the second floor (over the jail) alongside the sheriff's office at West Sixth and Irwin. The first Superior Court judge elected was Justin Jacobs, in the election of May 23, 1893. Judge Jacobs won re-election in 1894 and served until his death on September 18, 1898; he was succeeded by M.L. Short, who won his re-election campaign in 1890. Judge Short was succeeded by John G. Covert in 1906, who won his race by six votes.

A new county courthouse was authorized in 1896; the construction contract was awarded to John Haggerty on May 13, 1896, for $26,364. The architect responsible was William H. Wilcox. An addition completed in 1914 was built by Trewhitt-Shields to a design by J. Carl Thayer & Henri Dorlot.

== Venues ==
Kings County Superior Court locations:
1 114 W 8th St (Hanford, 1896/1914)
2 1426 South Dr (Hanford, 1977)
3 1640 Kings Cty Dr (Hanford, 2016)
4 501 E Kings St (Avenal)
5 1000 Chittenden Ave (Corcoran)
6 449 C St (Lemoore)

The original 1896 courthouse was expanded in 1914 and served as the county courthouse until 1977, when operations moved to the new County Center in Hanford. The 1896/1914 courthouse now hosts a commercial development with shops and restaurants called Courthouse Square. It was named to the National Register of Historic Places in 1978.

Court operations were consolidated in a single new building on February 16, 2016; the new building consolidates operations from five separate buildings, including the family law court, which was held in Lemoore. The 2016 courthouse has a gross floor area of 144,460 ft^{2} (13,421 m^{2}) and 12 courtrooms.
