= El Dorado County Superior Court =

California superior court with jurisdiction over El DoradoCountry

Superior Court of California, County of El Dorado
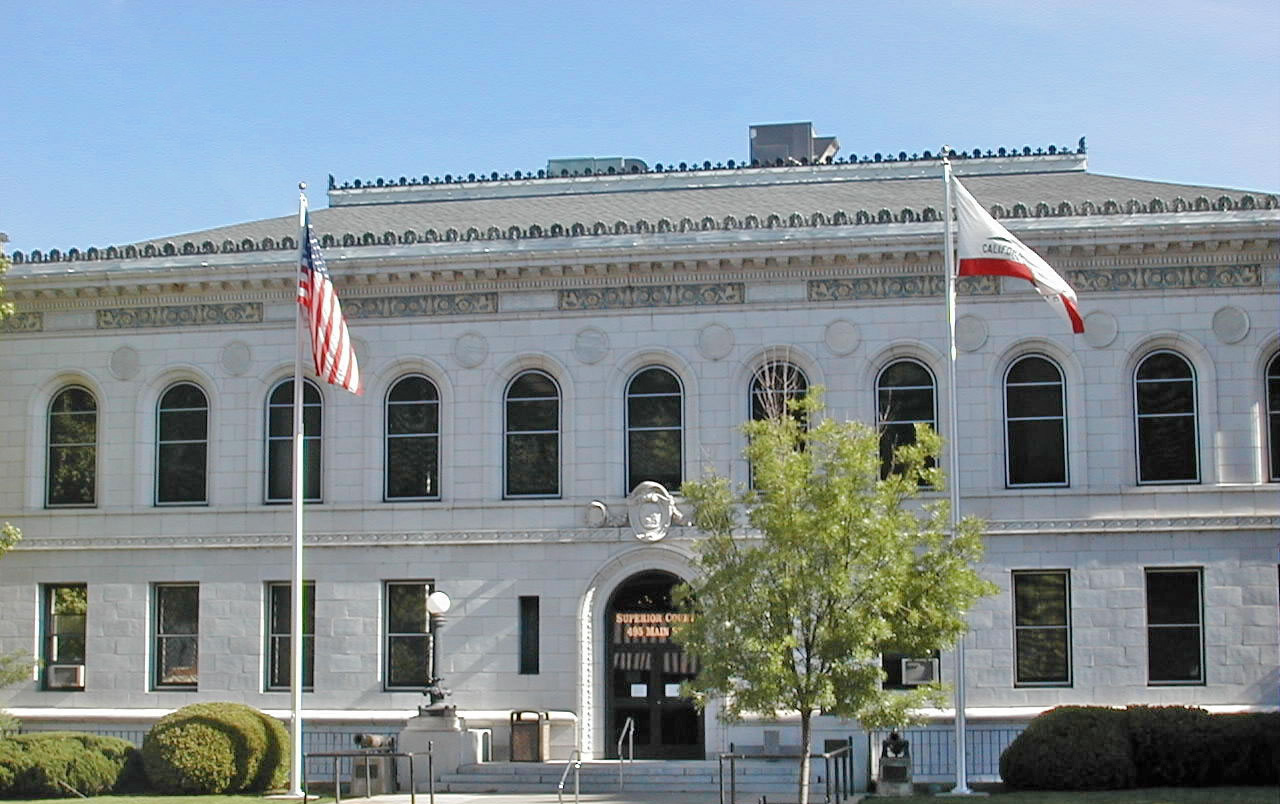
- 1913 courthouse in Placerville (photographed in 2006)
- Established: 1850
- Jurisdiction: El Dorado County, California
- Location: Placerville; Cameron Park; South Lake Tahoe
- Appeals to: California Court of Appeal for the Third District
- Website: www.eldorado.courts.ca.gov

Presiding Judge
- Currently: Hon. Vicki Ashworth

Assistant Presiding Judge
- Currently: Hon. Michael J. McLaughlin

Court Executive Officer
- Currently: Shelby Wineinger

The Superior Court of California, County of El Dorado, informally the El Dorado County Superior Court, is the California superior court with jurisdiction over El Dorado County.

== History ==
El Dorado County was one of the original counties established when California became a state.

Although Coloma, the initial county seat, promised to build several new buildings to serve the county government, an observer noted in 1856 "the present buildings are not suitable in which to transact the business of the Empire county" and the county seat was moved to Placerville in 1857. At least one Coloma resident objected to the move, claiming a new jail and court house were already complete but unoccupied.

In Placerville, a new county courthouse was completed in 1861. It was destroyed by fire on May 15, 1910, and replaced by a new concrete courthouse, completed in 1912 at the same site at a cost of US$131,000 (equivalent to $4,370,000 in 2025). The credited architects were Cuff & Diggs of Sacramento.

Court operations eventually outgrew the existing facility and an annex was added in the 1970s; in addition, new court facilities were opened at the County Government Center in the early 1990s.

On April 1, 2025 the street address of the Cameron Park branch of the Superior Court of El Dorado changed from 3321 Cameron Park Dr to 2927 Meder Rd.

== Venues ==
El Dorado County Superior Court locations:
1 Placerville Main, 495 Main St
2 Placerville Bldg C, 2850 Fairlane Ct
Placerville Fair Lane, 295 Fair Ln
3 Cameron Park, 2927 Meder Rd
4 South Lake Tahoe, 1354 Johnson Blvd

In addition to the buildings in Placerville, satellite courts for El Dorado County operate in Cameron Park and South Lake Tahoe.
