= Modoc County Superior Court =

California superior court with jurisdiction over Modoc County

Superior Court of California, County of Modoc
- 1914 courthouse (photographed in 2012 by Carol Highsmith)
- Interactive map of Superior Court of California, County of Modoc
- 41.48324°N 120.54029°W
- Established: 1874
- Jurisdiction: Modoc County, California
- Location: Alturas (county seat)
- Coordinates: 41.48324°N 120.54029°W
- Appeals to: California Court of Appeal for the Third District
- Website: modoc.courts.ca.gov

Presiding Judge
- Currently: Hon. Wendy J. Dier

Court Executive Officer
- Currently: Brandy Malcolm

The Superior Court of California, County of Modoc, informally the Modoc County Superior Court, is the California superior court with jurisdiction over Modoc County.

== History ==
Modoc County was partitioned from Siskiyou County in 1874. Alturas was named as the county seat and Julius Holliman was appointed as the first county judge.

The first court sessions in Alturas were held in the "community building" which also held the town's social gatherings such as public meetings, church services, and dances. That social hall was built in 1873 when the settlement was known as Dorris Bridge. The first purpose-built courthouse was completed in 1884 by T.B. Reese at Main and Water Streets. By 1911, the courthouse was characterized as "the oldest courthouse in the state, and it is probably the most dilapidated", warning that "many documents of untold value are in daily peril of destruction by fire". The second courthouse was torn down for scrap lumber after the third courthouse was completed.

Frederic DeLongchamps designed the 1914 courthouse, which was built by W.N. Concannon. A site was chosen in 1913 between the new grammar school and Main Street, on land that had been deeded to the county by James J. Dorris. The initial round of bids from prospective contractors were all rejected, as all the bids exceeded $90,000, while the architect's had estimated the cost at $84,000. The cornerstone for the new courthouse was scheduled to be laid on July 2, 1914, but this was delayed to September, and construction was completed on January 31, 1915. On May 6, 1915, the new courthouse was dedicated; the cost was estimated at US$125,000 (equivalent to $3,890,000 in 2024). The dome of the 1914 courthouse was traditionally painted copper, but was repainted in gold in 1974. A modern annex was added in 1993 and dedicated as the Robert A. Barclay Justice Center, honoring the former District Attorney and Modoc County Judge who had served there since 1961.

The 1914 courthouse underwent significant refurbishment in 2014–15 to prepare for its centennial.

== Venues ==
Modoc County Superior Court locations:
1 Water & Main (1883–1914)
2 205 S East St (1914–present)

The courthouse has always been in Alturas, the county seat.
