= Sutter County Superior Court =

California superior court with jurisdiction over Sutter Country

Superior Court of California, County of Sutter
- Interactive map of Superior Court of California, County of Sutter
- 39.14426°N 121.63812°W
- Established: 1850
- Jurisdiction: Sutter County, California
- Location: Yuba City
- Coordinates: 39.14426°N 121.63812°W
- Appeals to: California Court of Appeal for the Third District
- Website: sutter.courts.ca.gov

Presiding Judge
- Currently: Hon. David I. Ashby

Court Executive Officer
- Currently: Stephanie M. Hansel

The Superior Court of California, County of Sutter, informally known as the Sutter County Superior Court, is the California superior court with jurisdiction over Sutter County.

== History ==
Sutter County was one of the original counties established when California became a state.

The first courthouse was originally built in 1850, in Nicolaus, which served as the initial county seat. It became the American Hotel after the county seat was moved to Yuba City in 1854, and was razed in 1920.

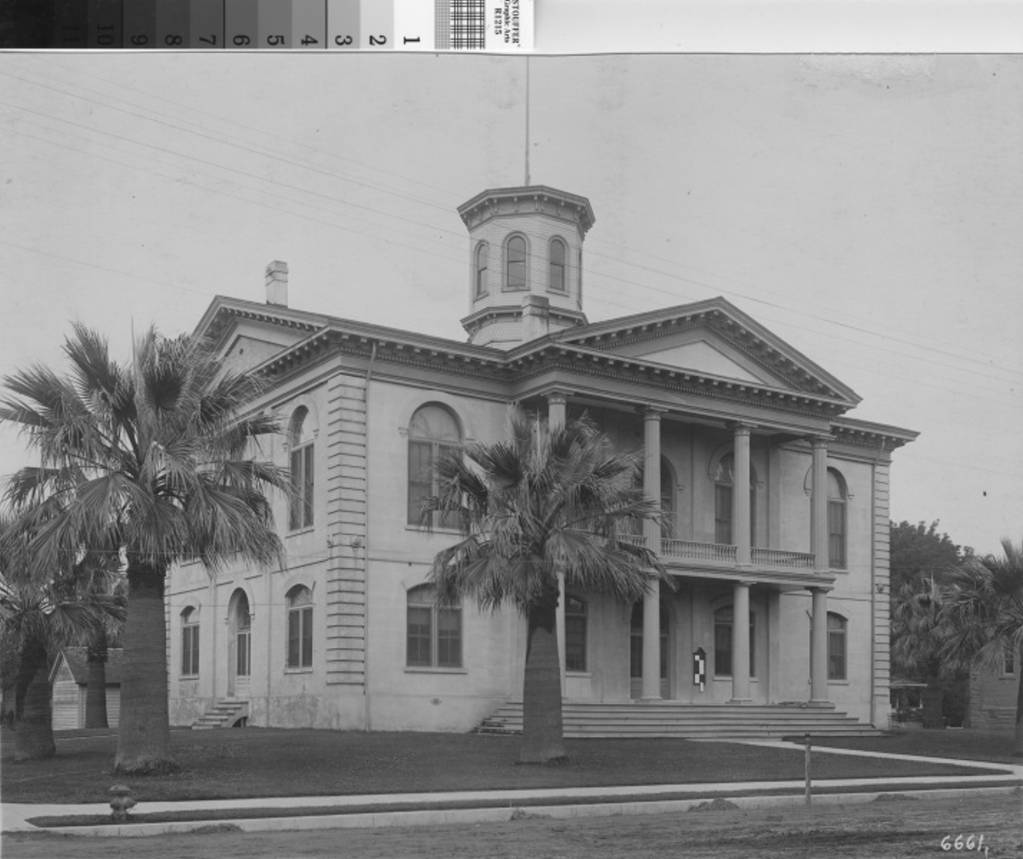
Courthouse West (c.1915)

Three courthouses were built on the same site in Yuba City: one completed in 1858 (destroyed by fire in 1871, reportedly by mice gnawing on matches), another completed in 1873 (destroyed by arson in 1899), and a third completed in 1900 as a replica of the second. The third courthouse is still standing and is known as Courthouse West or Old Courthouse.

In 1920, citizens from the town of Live Oak proposed the county seat be moved there should a portion of Butte County known as the Gridley District secede and join Sutter County.

Sutter County Superior Court locations:
1 Sutter County Courthouse (2016), 1175 Civic Center Dr
2 Courthouse West (1900), 446 Second St
3 Courthouse East (1953), 463 Second St
4 Family Law Center, 430 Center St

Court facilities were expanded across the street to the County Office Building, which was completed in 1953 and is also known as Courthouse East. An annex to Courthouse West was completed in 1961.

Operations at Courthouse West and Courthouse East ceased in August 2015 and were moved to the new courthouse facility. The new Sutter County Courthouse was completed in 2016, and occupied starting on January 19 of that year, consolidating court operations from three separate facilities (Courthouse West, Courthouse East, and the Family Law Center, in a leased building). The Sutter County Superior Court relinquished its interest in the Courthouse East/Sutter County Office Building in June 2016.

== Judges ==
Christopher Chandler served as a Superior Court judge from his appointment in 1998 until his retirement on May 31, 2016.

Susan E. Green currently serves as the court's presiding judge.
