= Yolo County Superior Court =

California superior court with jurisdiction over Yolo Country

Superior Court of California, County of Yolo
- Interactive map of Superior Court of California, County of Yolo
- 38.6769°N 121.7677°W
- Established: 1864
- Jurisdiction: Yolo County, California
- Location: Woodland
- Coordinates: 38.6769°N 121.7677°W
- Appeals to: California Court of Appeal for the Third District
- Website: yolo.courts.ca.gov

Presiding Judge
- Currently: Hon. Tom M. Dyer

Assistant Presiding Judge
- Currently: Hon. Sonia Cortés

Court Executive Officer
- Currently: Shawn C. Landry
- Since: May 1, 2013

The Superior Court of California, County of Yolo, is the California superior court with jurisdiction over Yolo County.

== History ==
Yolo County was one of the original counties formed in 1850 when California gained statehood.

The first Yolo County Courthouse was completed on January 9, 1864; it was designed by the only architect in Woodland, California, A.A. Bennett. The builder was P. McManus; work began on June 26, 1863, and was scheduled to complete by October 1. The final cost was US$27,858.40 (equivalent to $560,000 in 2024), overrunning the original budget of US$24,250 by almost 15%. Earthquakes in 1892, 1904, and 1906 led to the condemnation of the building in 1911.

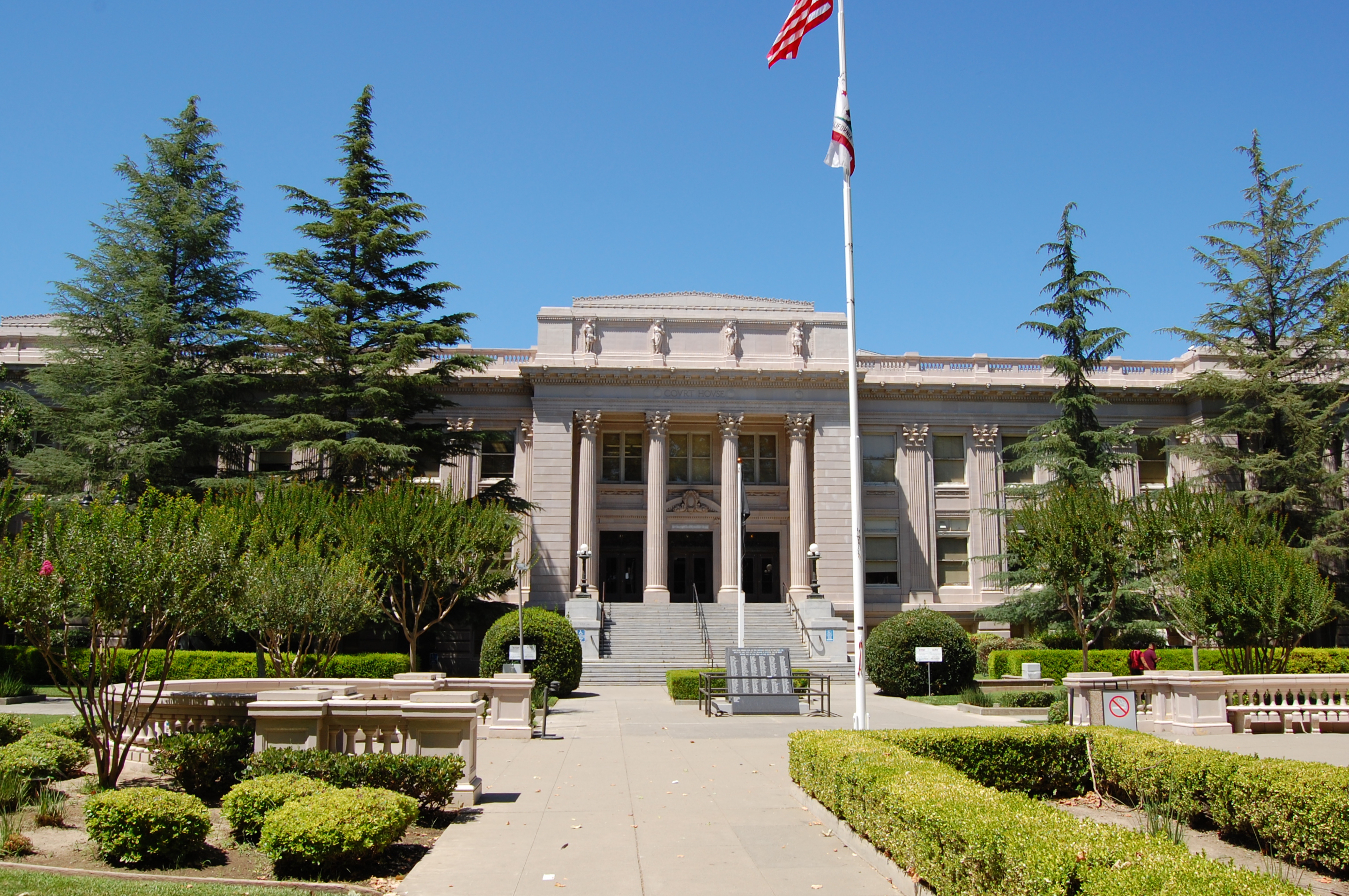
Yolo County Courthouse (1917) by William H. Weeks, photographed in 2011

A new Yolo County Courthouse, designed by William H. Weeks, was completed in 1917. It was placed on the National Register of Historic Places in 1987. As the population of the county grew, the court system also grew to encompass seven separate buildings; a new courthouse was completed in 2015 to consolidate operations into a single building with fourteen courtrooms.
