= Calaveras County Superior Court =

California superior court with jurisdiction over Calaveras County

Superior Court of California, County of Calaveras
- Interactive map of Superior Court of California, County of Calaveras
- 38.1935°N 120.6671°W
- Established: 1850
- Jurisdiction: Calaveras County, California
- Location: San Andreas
- Coordinates: 38.1935°N 120.6671°W
- Appeals to: California Court of Appeal for the Third District
- Website: calaveras.courts.ca.gov

Presiding Judge
- Currently: Hon. Timothy S. Healy

Court Executive Officer
- Currently: Monica L. Alemán

The Superior Court of California, County of Calaveras, informally the Calaveras County Superior Court, is the California superior court with jurisdiction over Calaveras County.

== History ==
Calaveras County was one of the original counties formed when California gained statehood in 1850.

Calaveras County Superior Court locations:
1 Former Courthouse/Hotel Léger (1852–66), 8304 Main St (Mokelumne Hill)
2 Former Courthouse (1867–1966), 50 N Main St (San Andreas)
3 Former Courthouse (1966–2014), 891 Mountain Ranch Rd (San Andreas)
Courthouse (2014+), 400 Government Center Dr (San Andreas)

San Andreas became the fifth and final county seat in 1866, which had moved often as mining fortunes rose and fell in Calaveras County. Prior county seats included Pleasant Valley (1850), Double Springs (1850), Jackson (1850–52), and Mokelumne Hill (1852–66). According to local history, the move from Double Springs to Jackson was facilitated by the residents of Jackson, who had invited county officials to visit and drink in July 1851; they stole the county records afterwards. The remains of the camphor wood Double Springs courthouse, completed in 1850 as the first in the county, are still present, although they have been moved to San Andreas and reassembled at the Calaveras County Historical Society Museum, which presently is housed in the 1867 courthouse.

The Calaveras County seat was moved from Jackson to Mokelumne Hill in 1852, prompting Jackson leaders to campaign for what would become Amador County, created from parts of Calaveras and El Dorado counties in 1854. Jackson was later voted the county seat of the new Amador County.

The wooden court house building in Mokelumne Hill was acquired by George W. Léger after the county seat moved in 1866 and incorporated into his adjoining hotel. The hotel was damaged by fire in 1874 and restored in 1879; it is presently branded and operates as the Hotel Léger.

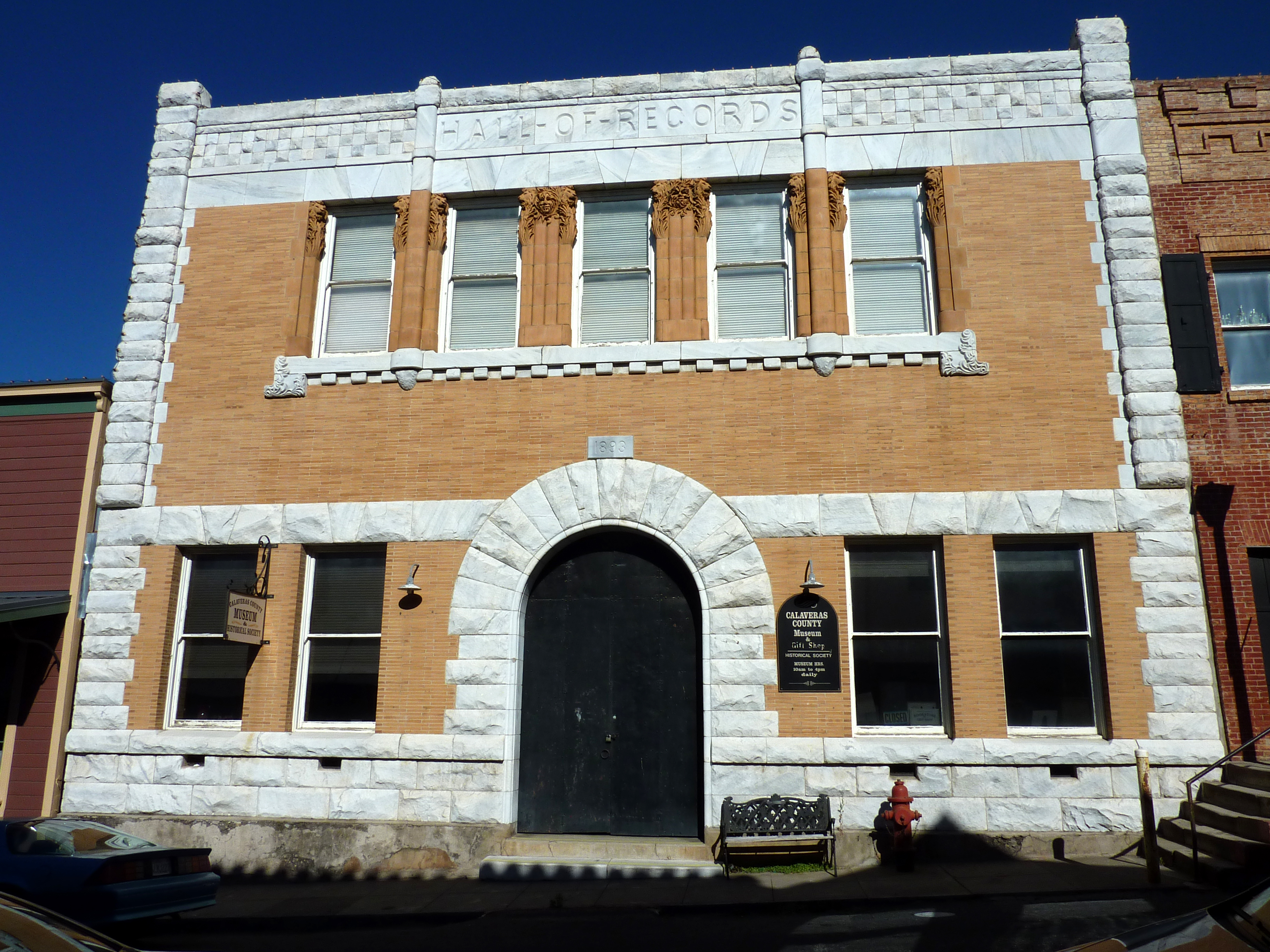
1867 Hall of Records and Courthouse in San Andreas (photographed in 2009)

The San Andreas court house building was erected in 1867 using locally produced bricks and mortar, and served in this capacity until 1966, when court operations were moved to a new site at the Government Center near the eastern edge of the town. The 1867 San Andreas court house has two stories and occupies a footprint 46 feet 4 inches (14.12 m) wide by 67 1/2 feet (20.6 m) long. The Hall of Records is a separate building erected on the same lot in 1893, completely obscuring the facade of the 1867 court house. One notable trial that occurred in this court house was that of Charles E. Bolton, aka Black Bart.

Courthouse operations were moved again in 2013 after the completion of a new County Courthouse in San Andreas, just north of the 1966 courthouse. The 2013 courthouse, which opened on November 25, is certified LEED Silver. Case overflow sometimes requires some court operations to be held in the 1867 courthouse.
