= Merced County Superior Court =

California superior court with jurisdiction over Merced County

Superior Court of California, County of Merced
- Interactive map of Superior Court of California, County of Merced
- 37.30801°N 120.48236°W
- Established: 1855
- Jurisdiction: Merced County, California
- Location: Merced (county seat); Los Banos
- Coordinates: 37.30801°N 120.48236°W
- Appeals to: California Court of Appeal for the Fifth District
- Website: merced.courts.ca.gov

Presiding Judge
- Currently: Hon. Paul C. Lo

Assistant Presiding Judge
- Currently: Hon. Jennifer O. Trimble

Court Executive Officer
- Currently: Amanda Toste

The Superior Court of California, County of Merced, informally the Merced County Superior Court, is the California superior court with jurisdiction over Merced County.

== History ==
Merced County was partitioned from Mariposa County in 1855.

In May 1855, John W. Fitzhugh was elected the first County Judge. The county seat was established on Mariposa Creek, approximately 8 mi (13 km) from the present-day site of Merced, on the ranch of Turner & Osborne and court was held in a one-story wooden building with a footprint of approximately 12 ft × 25 ft (3.7 m × 7.6 m). Judge Fitzhugh presided over the first session, held in June 1855, with associate justices Samuel H.P. Ross and J.A. Vance. With the fair summer weather, grand jury proceedings were held under a large oak tree approximately 150 yd (140 m) from the court house on the south branch of the creek, while the trial jury deliberated on the north branch of the creek under a similar copse. Early court history recounts the Court Clerk being beset by winds; when the strong breezes scattered the papers he carried in his hat and pockets, the court would temporarily adjourn in favor of "hunting and catching papers."

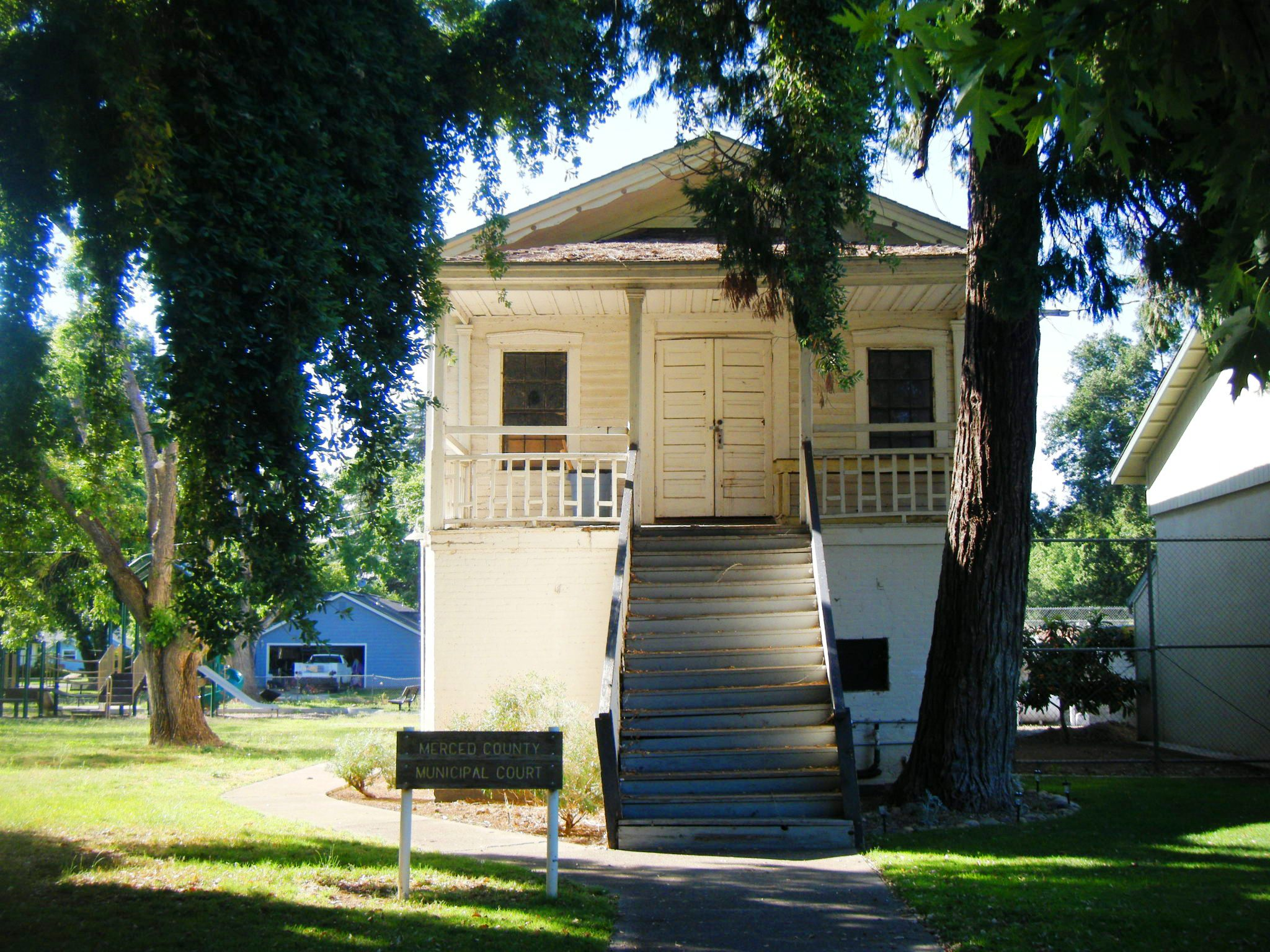
1857 courthouse in Snelling, now California Historical Landmark No. 409 (2010)

The county seat were moved to Snelling via the election of September 1855, and court was held temporarily in the parlor of the only hotel in town. The first permanent courthouse in Merced County was completed there in early 1857 at the cost of US$13,000 (equivalent to $440,000 in 2024) by James O. McGahey and Charles S. Peck. This 1857 courthouse was named California Historical Landmark No. 409 in November 1948.

After the railroad had completed its line to Merced, a petition was filed in October 1872 to move the county seat there, contested by an election held on December 12 of that year. Merced finished first by a clear majority, with Livingston second and Snelling third. The court was moved again, temporarily, to a brick building owned by Olcise & Garibaldi at Front and L streets, then to the lower story of Washington Hall while a second permanent courthouse was being built. Bids for a new courthouse were opened on April 2, 1874, and the low bid was submitted by A.W. Burrell & Co., for US$55,970 (equivalent to $1,560,000 in 2024).

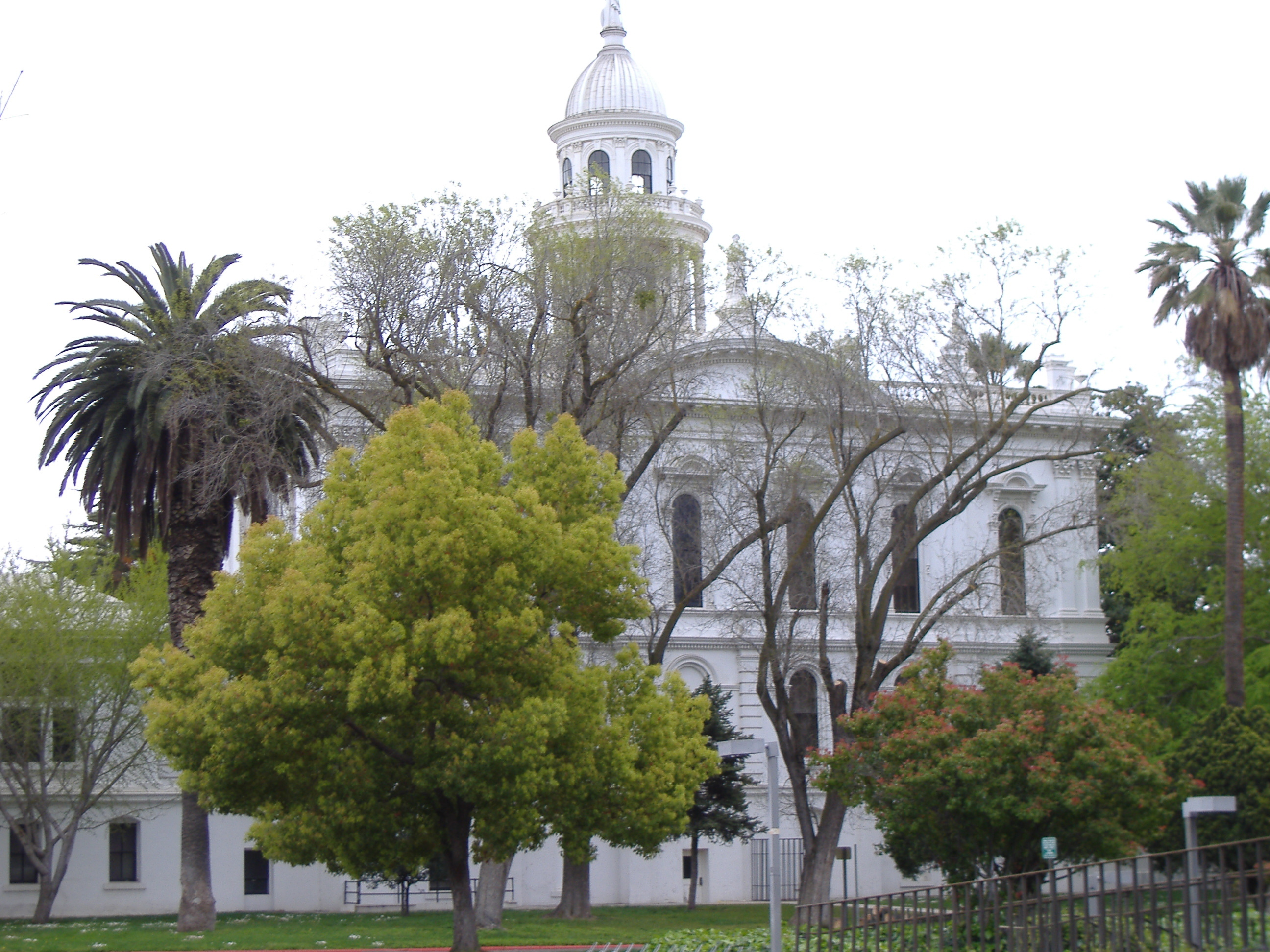
1875 Merced County Courthouse (2006)

The cornerstone for the new courthouse was laid on July 7, 1874 and the Merced County Courthouse was dedicated on May 8, 1875. As completed, the 1875 courthouse had a footprint of approximately 60 ft × 95 ft (18 m × 29 m), with a basement and two stories topped by a substantial dome in the Roman Corinthian / Italian Renaissance style. It was designed by A. A. Bennett. A close twin was completed in Fresno also in 1875, but it was drastically altered in 1893 and later demolished.

Court operations outgrew the 1875 building and were moved to new facilities in 1950. The one-story 1950 courthouse was designed by Walter Wagner.

== Venues ==
Merced County Superior Court locations:
1 2260 N St (Merced, 2008+)
627 W 21st St (Merced, 1875–1950)
640 W 21st St (Merced, 1950–2007)
720 W 20th St (Merced, traffic)
2 1159 G St (Los Banos)
3 2840 W Sandy Mush Rd (Los Banos, Juvenile)
4 CA-59 (Snelling, 1857–72)

Court operations were consolidated into a single tilt-up concrete building completed in 2007 to a design by Nacht & Lewis. The 1875 courthouse continues to serve the public as the home of the Merced County Courthouse Museum, operated by the Merced County Historical Society; it was rebuilt in 1975 and reopened as a museum in 1983.

In addition to the old and new courthouse locations in Merced, traffic court is held approximately two blocks away in Merced, and a branch court operates in Los Banos. Juvenile justice operations are also held in unincorporated Los Banos.
