= Mendocino County Superior Court =

California superior court with jurisdiction over Mendocino County

Superior Court of California, County of Mendocino
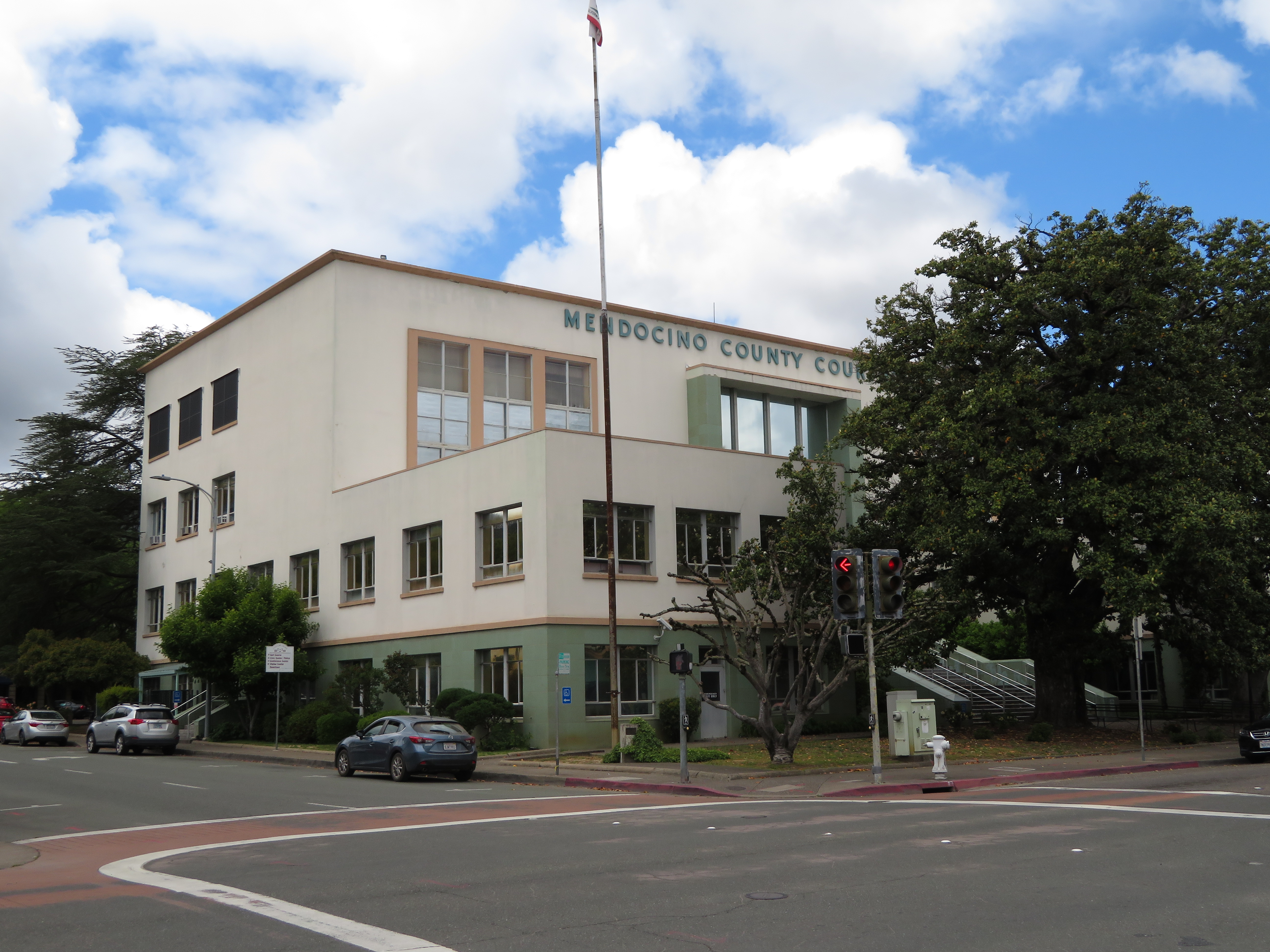
- 1950 Mendocino County Courthouse (photographed in 2019)
- Interactive map of Superior Court of California, County of Mendocino
- 39.15023°N 123.20833°W
- Established: 1850
- Jurisdiction: Mendocino County, California
- Location: Ukiah (county seat); Fort Bragg
- Coordinates: 39.15023°N 123.20833°W
- Appeals to: California Court of Appeal for the First District
- Website: mendocino.courts.ca.gov

Presiding Judge
- Currently: Hon. Keith Faulder

Assistant Presiding Judge
- Currently: Hon. Carly Dolan

Court Executive Officer
- Currently: Kim Turner

The Superior Court of California, County of Mendocino, informally the Mendocino County Superior Court, is the California superior court with jurisdiction over Mendocino County.

== History ==
Mendocino County was one of the original counties established when California gained statehood in 1850.

For revenue and judicial purposes, Mendocino County was attached to Sonoma County and gained its independence in 1859; that year the county seat was established at Ukiah. The only other competitor for the county seat was Calpella. The first county courthouse was built in 1859. Bids for the new courthouse were received in August 1859 and upon unsealing the bids, the contract was awarded to E. Rathburn for US$6,000 (equivalent to $210,000 in 2024). This first courthouse was accepted on January 24, 1860.

It was replaced by a new courthouse in 1872, which was described as "a building that should be the pride of every citizen of Mendocino County". The architect was A. P. Petit. The initial plans were accepted by the County Board of Supervisors on January 15, 1872, then summarily rejected and revised plans were accepted on March 23. It had a prominent dome or cupola and stood 71 ft (22 m) tall, including the 34 ft (10 m) dome, with a footprint of 111 ft × 70 ft (34 m × 21 m). During construction, county offices were temporarily moved to the upper level of Hoffman's store, at the corner of Perkins and State streets.

The 1873 courthouse in Ukiah was replaced on the same site in 1950 with the current, modern building designed by C.A. Caulkins, Jr. An annex to the 1873 courthouse, built in 1928, was retained.

== Venues ==
Mendocino County Superior Court locations:
1 100 N State St (Ukiah)
2 700 S Franklin St (Fort Bragg)

A new 7-room courthouse has been proposed for Ukiah to replace the 1950 structure. The new courthouse will be built on a 4.1-acre (1.7 ha) site off East Perkins Street. The branch courthouse in Fort Bragg sees limited service.
