= Trinity County Superior Court =

California superior court with jurisdiction over Trinity County

Superior Court of California, County of Trinity
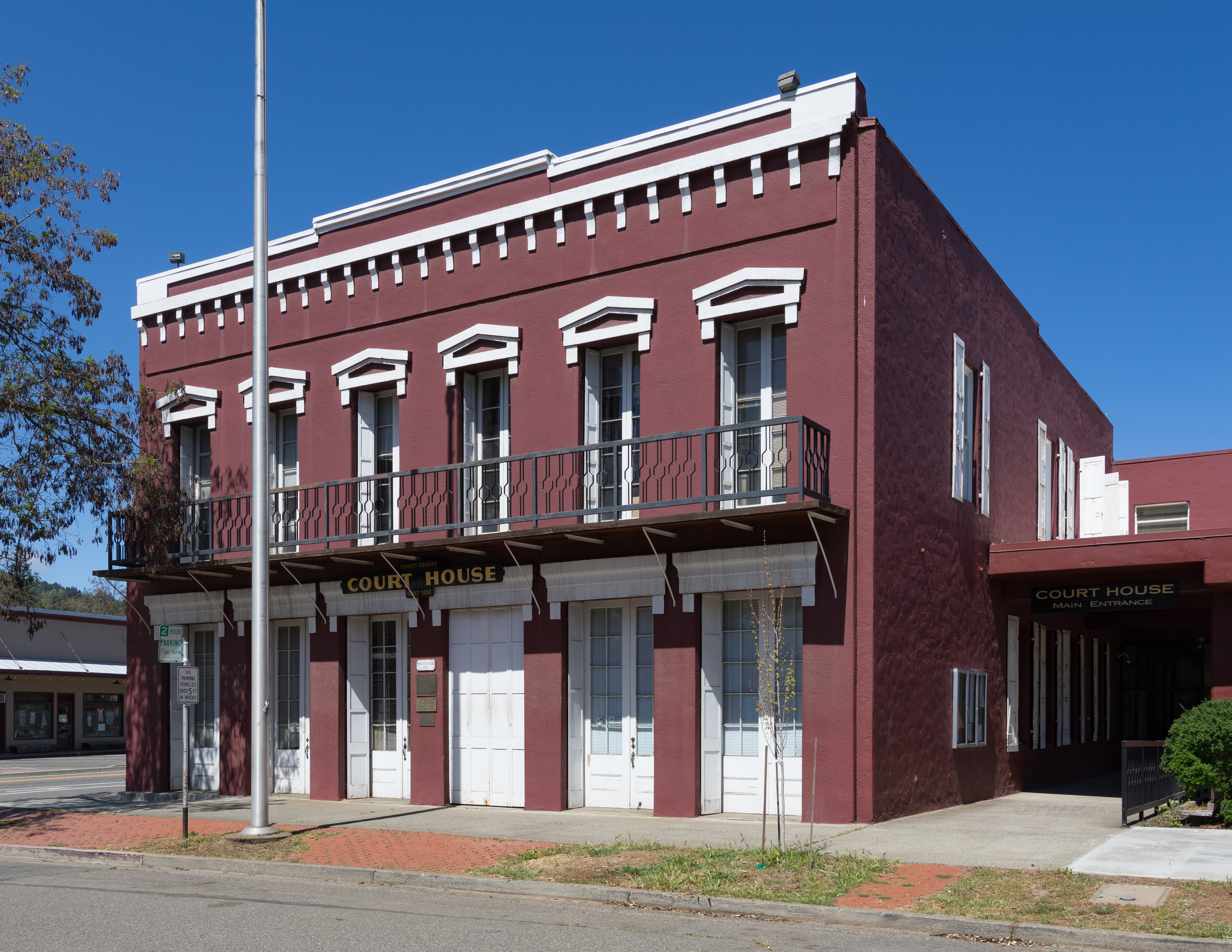
- Trinity County Superior Court house in Weaverville (photographed in April 2020)
- Established: 1850
- Jurisdiction: Trinity County, California
- Location: Main: Weaverville; Branch: Hayfork
- Appeals to: California Court of Appeal for the Third District
- Website: trinity.courts.ca.gov

Presiding Judge
- Currently: Hon. Eric L. Heryford

Assistant Presiding Judge
- Currently: Hon. Michael B. Harper

Court Executive Officer
- Currently: Staci Holliday

The Superior Court of California, County of Trinity, informally known as the Trinity County Superior Court, is the California superior court with jurisdiction over Trinity County.

== History ==
Trinity County was one of the original counties formed when California gained statehood in 1850.

The first courthouse was completed in 1853 as a three-storey wooden building at the intersection of Court and Church streets in the county seat of Weaverville. It had a footprint of 20 by 60 feet (6.1 m × 18.3 m). The third storey was purchased by the Trinity Masonic Lodge for US$500. The 1853 Weaverville courthouse was condemned in an 1860 grand jury report, which found that "bed bugs had invaded the offices of the sheriff and the clerk, had defiled the records, and had even attacked a judge on the bench", prompting local officials to move.

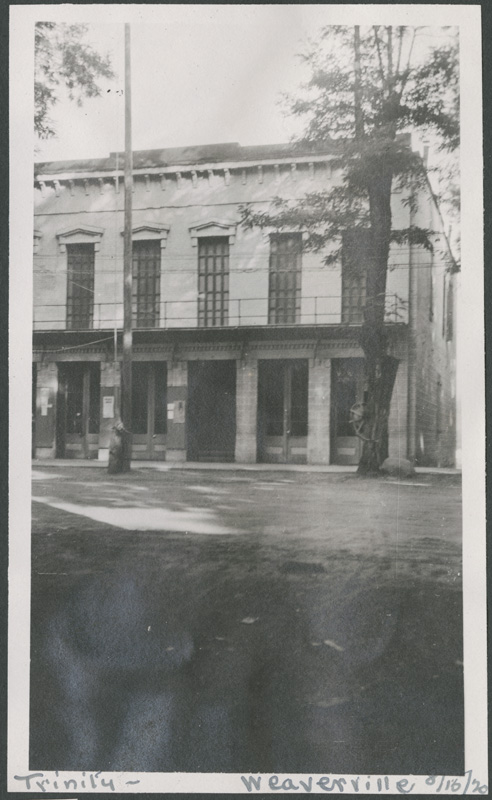
Trinity County Courthouse (1920)

Court operations moved into a newer brick building, shortly after it was purchased in 1865; the building formerly housed the Apollo Saloon and hotel. The 1853 courthouse was destroyed in a September 1866 fire. The brick building purchased in 1865 was built originally in 1856–57 for Henry Hocker as a saloon, store, and office building. Trinity County purchased the building for US$9,000 (equivalent to $180,000 in 2024) in 1865, and it has since been remodeled and expanded in 1935, 1958, and 1976. It is the second oldest courthouse still being used by a county-level California Superior Court; the oldest is the 1854 courthouse used by the Mariposa County Superior Court.

== Venues ==
Trinity County Superior Court locations:
1 Main Courthouse, 11 Court St (Weaverville)
2 Branch, 6641B SR 3 (Hayfork)

In addition to the historic Weaverville courthouse, which was added to the National Register of Historic Places as part of the Weaverville Historic District in 1971, Trinity County Superior Court also holds regularly scheduled sessions at the county sheriff's substation in Hayfork and at the Community Center dining hall in Mad River. However, all jury trials are conducted in Weaverville.
