= Madera County Superior Court =

California superior court with jurisdiction over Madera County

Superior Court of California, County of Madera
- Interactive map of Superior Court of California, County of Madera
- 36.95880°N 120.06069°W
- Established: 1864
- Jurisdiction: Madera County, California
- Location: Madera (county seat)
- Coordinates: 36.95880°N 120.06069°W
- Appeals to: California Court of Appeal for the Fifth District
- Website: madera.courts.ca.gov

Presiding Judge
- Currently: Hon. Dale J. Blea

Assistant Presiding Judge
- Currently: Hon. Sosi C. Vogt

The Superior Court of California, County of Madera, informally the Madera County Superior Court, is the California superior court with jurisdiction over Madera County.

== History ==
Madera County was partitioned from Fresno County in 1893.

The first Superior Court sessions in Madera were held on the upper floor of a drugstore until a permanent courthouse was completed in 1901. After a 1906 fire that destroyed the clock tower and upper floors, the courthouse was rebuilt and served the Superior Court and county offices until 1957, when they were relocated to the former Lincoln Elementary School, which was completed in 1913 and remodeled in 1955. The old courthouse remained vacant until 1971, when it was taken by the Madera County Historical Society and repurposed as a museum. In September 2015, the court was moved to its present location, adjacent to the County Administration Building. The new building was designed by the AC Martin company.

== Venues ==
Madera County Superior Court locations:
1 210 Yosemite Ave (1901–1957)
2 209 Yosemite Ave (1957–2015)
3 200 South G St (2015)

The courthouse is in Madera, the county seat. Since 1901, the sites all have been within one block of the old courthouse.
