= Superior Courts of California =

State trial courts with general jurisdiction

The superior courts of California are the state trial court system of the U.S. state of California. They have general jurisdiction to hear and decide any civil or criminal action which is not specially designated to be heard in some other court or before a governmental agency. As mandated by the California Constitution, there is a superior court in each of the 58 counties in California. The superior courts also have appellate divisions (superior court judges sitting as appellate judges) which hear appeals from decisions in infraction and misdemeanor cases.

Prior to June 1998, California's trial court system was divided into superior courts and municipal courts, each operating under separate jurisdictions with the number of judges set by the California State Legislature. That structure changed in June 1998, when voters passed Proposition 220 of 1998, a constitutional amendment allowing judges within each county to consolidate the two court types into a single, unified superior court. By February 2001, every one of California's 58 counties had approved unification of their trial courts.

== Organization ==
The superior courts are the lowest level of state courts in California holding general jurisdiction on civil and criminal matters. Above them are the six California courts of appeal, each with appellate jurisdiction over the superior courts within their districts, and the Supreme Court of California. As of 2007, the superior courts of California consisted of over 1,500 judges, and make up the largest part of California's judicial system, which is in turn one of the largest court systems in the United States.

Superior court judges are elected by each county's voters to six-year terms. California attorneys are allowed to run against sitting superior court judges at their retention elections, and have occasionally succeeded in doing so. Vacancies in the superior courts are filled by appointments made by the governor.

Because Los Angeles County has the largest population of any county in the United States, it also has the largest superior court—indeed, the Los Angeles County Superior Court is the single largest unified trial court in the United States. The court is organized into dozens of highly specialized departments, dealing with everything from moving violations to mental health. Its 510 judges are assisted by 75 commissioners.

In contrast, many of California's smallest counties, like Alpine, Del Norte, Inyo, Lake, Lassen, Mono, and Trinity, typically have only two superior court judges each, who are usually assisted by a single part-time commissioner.

To be eligible to become a superior court judge in California, one must have been a member of the State Bar of California for at least ten years.

One quirk of California law is that when a party petitions the appellate courts for a writ of mandate (California's version of mandamus), the case name becomes [petitioner name] v. Superior Court (that is, the superior court is the respondent on appeal), and the real opponent is then listed below those names as the "real party in interest". This is why several U.S. Supreme Court decisions in cases that originated in California bear names like Asahi Metal Industry Co. v. Superior Court (1987) and Burnham v. Superior Court of California (1990). The underlying justification is that the writ jurisdiction of the California Courts of Appeal is to make an order directing the Superior Court to enter an order in its records, while the real party in interest has standing to oppose the appellate application for a writ. Normally, there is "no appearance for respondent", but in certain rare circumstances, the Superior Court does have standing to oppose an application for a writ, and has actually done so.

=== Appellate divisions ===
Another quirk is that because the superior courts are now fully unified with all courts of inferior jurisdiction, the superior courts must hear relatively minor cases that previously would have been heard in such inferior courts, such as infractions, misdemeanors, "limited civil" actions (actions where the amount in controversy is below $35,000), and "small claims" actions. The superior courts have appellate divisions (superior court judges sitting as appellate judges) which were previously responsible for hearing appeals from inferior courts. Now, the appellate divisions hear appeals from decisions of other superior court judges (or commissioners, or judges pro tem) who heard and decided such minor cases. Unlike appellate divisions in other states (such as the New York Supreme Court, Appellate Division), the appellate divisions of the superior courts are not considered to be separate courts.

Like the vast majority of U.S. state trial courts, most superior court decisions involve the judge merely signing a proposed order drafted by one side or the other. Thus, superior court decisions are not normally reported either in reporters or legal databases.

However, appellate divisions of the superior courts do sometimes certify opinions for publication. Such opinions are published in California Appellate Reports Supplement, which is included in the regular volumes of the California Appellate Reports, the official reporter of the Courts of Appeal.

Proposition 220 of 1998 created the Appellate Division of the Superior Court, which replaced the previous Appellate Department but retained the same jurisdictional authority.

== Governance ==
Every California court may make local rules for its own government and the government of its officers as long as these local rules are not inconsistent with law or with the rules adopted and prescribed by the Judicial Council of California.

== History ==
The concept of having a superior court of general jurisdiction in each of California's counties dates back to the ratification of the second California Constitution in 1879. Previously, the original California Constitution of 1849 and the California Judiciary Act of 1851 had created multi-county district courts of general jurisdiction which supervised county courts and justice of the peace courts of limited jurisdiction.

Notably, the superior courts did not always enjoy the unified jurisdiction that they possess now. The 1879 state constitution authorized the state legislature to establish inferior courts at its discretion in any city, town, or city and county, with powers, duties, and terms to be fixed by statute. By the mid-20th century, California had as many as six, seven, or eight types of inferior courts of limited jurisdiction under the superior courts, depending upon how they were counted. There were two types of municipal courts (one of which was called "police court"), two types of police courts (not to be confused with the "police court" which was a kind of municipal court), city justices' courts, city courts, and Class A and Class B judicial township justices' courts.

In 1947, the state legislature directed the state judicial council to study the structure of the state's inferior courts. The council's 1948 study found: "There are six separate and distinct types of inferior courts, totaling 767 in number, created and governed under varied constitutional, statutory, and charter provisions." The council found there was much "multiplicity" and "duplication" between the superior courts and the various types of inferior courts, resulting in "conflict and uncertainty in jurisdiction". Even worse, most inferior courts were not staffed by full-time professional judges; they were presided over on a part-time basis, either by laymen who also operated outside businesses or attorneys in private practice. Chief Justice Phil S. Gibson remarked that "there are very few lawyers who can correctly name all the types of trial courts in the state, much less give the sources and extent of their jurisdiction." To fix this colossal mess, the judicial council proposed and the legislature enacted the Court Act of 1949 to reduce the number of types of inferior courts to two: municipal courts and justice of the peace courts, which were renamed "justice courts". This dropped the total number of courts in California to less than 400. To solve the problem of inferior courts which overlapped one another, all county boards of supervisors were required to divide their counties into judicial districts. Each district would be served by only one inferior court of limited jurisdiction underneath the superior court. Districts with populations more than 40,000 would be served by municipal courts, and districts with lesser populations would be served by justice courts. Municipal court jurisdiction was limited to civil cases where the amount in controversy was $2,000 or less and criminal misdemeanors, while justice court jurisdiction was limited to civil cases involving $500 or less and so-called "low grade misdemeanors". For the Court Act to become fully effective, a constitutional amendment had to be submitted to the state electorate as Proposition 3, which was duly approved on November 7, 1950.

Despite ongoing calls for further reform and trial court unification, California's trial court system remained quite complex for several more decades. In 1971, a legislative select committee found that the trial court system was fragmented into "58 superior courts, 75 municipal courts, and 244 justice courts, of which 74 percent were single-judge courts".

Starting in the 1970s, California began to slowly phase out the use of justice courts (in which non-lawyers were authorized by statute to preside as judges) after a landmark 1974 decision in which the Supreme Court of California unanimously held that it was a violation of due process to allow a non-lawyer to preside over a criminal trial which could result in incarceration of the defendant. This was a "bombshell" decision which created "a true crisis in judicial administration" because at the time, non-lawyer judges were presiding over 127 justice courts. In response, the Judicial Council of California arranged for the immediate enactment of legislation to upgrade 22 attorneys already sitting as justice court judges from part-time to full-time service and allow them to "ride circuit" and hear such trials in any justice court then presided over by a non-lawyer judge. Another change was that all new justice court judges after that point in time had to be attorneys.

The next major attempt at trial court reform and unification started in 1992 when state senator Bill Lockyer introduced Senate Constitutional Amendment 3, which would have unified the superior, municipal and justice courts in each county into a single "district court". In response, the California Law Revision Commission published a comprehensive study in January 1994 which carefully evaluated options for the proposed court's name such as "district", "superior", "county", "trial", "unified", and "circuit", and concluded that the preferable name was "superior court". The Commission acknowledged the name could be confusing due to the absence of any inferior courts after unification, but contended this was outweighed by the benefits of continuing to use a familiar name, not having to spend money on changing existing superior court signs and letterhead, and not having to amend over 3,000 references to the superior court in 1,600 statutes. SCA 3 passed the state senate but failed to pass the state assembly; it remains historically important, however, because it laid the groundwork and created political momentum towards the more gradual reform process which ultimately prevailed.

In 1994, the state electorate approved Proposition 191, which amended the state constitution to eliminate the remaining justice courts and force them to consolidate with the municipal courts. In 1998, the electorate approved Proposition 220, which amended the state constitution to authorize trial court judges in each county to decide whether or not to retain municipal courts. Within two months, by December 31, 1998, judges in 50 of California's 58 counties had voted for consolidation of municipal courts with superior courts. The last county to achieve trial court unification was Kings County Superior Court, where the state's last four municipal court judges were sworn in by Chief Justice Ronald M. George as superior court judges on February 8, 2001. Therefore, at present, the superior courts are actually not "superior" to any inferior courts within the judicial branch. They are still superior to certain types of administrative hearings within the executive branch; dissatisfied litigants can appeal to superior courts through administrative mandamus.

Many of California's larger superior courts have specialized divisions for different types of cases like criminal, civil, traffic, small claims, probate, family, juvenile, and complex litigation, but these divisions are simply administrative assignments that can be rearranged at the discretion of each superior court's presiding judge in response to changing caseloads (that is, regardless of whether the division is colloquially called "traffic court" or "family court", all orders are issued by judges of the superior court). In contrast, inferior courts were creatures of statute and thus were more difficult to rearrange. Judges stationed at rural superior courts too small to set up specialized divisions must be generalists who can handle everything; the state judicial education center provides a special training program for "Cow County Judges".

Another peculiarity of California law is that traditionally, the superior courts did not own their own buildings or employ their own staff, and the state government was not required to provide them with such things. Even though the superior courts were clearly part of the judicial branch of the state government, they were actually operated by county governments who were expected to provide buildings, security, and staff for the superior courts out of their own local budgets. At the same time, courthouse construction and maintenance were often overlooked among the numerous mandatory responsibilities placed upon counties by California law. Even worse, because so many of the responsibilities delegated to county governments were of a nature which people were likely to sue over, this arrangement put superior court judges in the awkward position of frequently ruling on lawsuits involving the very county governments responsible for maintaining their courthouses and providing their staff.

Counties were allowed to collect trial court fees, fines, and forfeitures to help fund trial court operations, but those sources of funds were not sufficient. The enacting of Proposition 13 by the state electorate in 1978 became a catalyst for reform of trial court funding because it placed California counties into such severe financial distress that they could no longer bear the burden of such a partially-funded mandate. The paradox of state judicial officers working in county-operated organizations culminated in a 1996 case in which the Supreme Court of California upheld the constitutionality of a statute under which the superior court of Mendocino County was bound by the county board of supervisors' designation of unpaid furlough days for all county employees, including those who worked for the superior court.

The California State Legislature attempted to fix these issues by first enacting the Lockyer-Isenberg Trial Court Funding Act of 1997 to begin the process of transitioning the superior courts from county budgets to the state budget. Next came the Trial Court Employment Protection and Governance Act of 2000 to separate trial court employees from county governments, followed by the Trial Court Facilities Act of 2002 to transfer courthouses from the county governments to the state government. The first courthouse transfer, in Riverside County, took place in October 2004. On December 29, 2009, the Administrative Office of the Courts announced that the process of transferring 532 facilities to state control was complete with the transfer of the Glenn County Superior Courthouse.

== List ==
Number in parentheses represent cities/communities with multiple courthouses

County seats are highlighted in bold.

Court	County	Courthouse location(s)	Image	Source
Alameda County Superior Court	Alameda	**Oakland (3)**, Alameda, Berkeley (probate), Dublin, Fremont, Hayward, San Leandro (2)		
Alpine County Superior Court	Alpine	**Markleeville**		
Amador County Superior Court	Amador	**Jackson**		
Butte County Superior Court	Butte	**Oroville**, Chico		
Calaveras County Superior Court	Calaveras	**San Andreas**		
Colusa County Superior Court	Colusa	**Colusa (2)**		
Contra Costa County Superior Court	Contra Costa	**Martinez (3)**, Pittsburg, Richmond, Walnut Creek		
Del Norte County Superior Court	Del Norte	**Crescent City**		
El Dorado County Superior Court	El Dorado	**Placerville (3)**, Cameron Park, South Lake Tahoe		
Fresno County Superior Court	Fresno	**Fresno (6)**		
Glenn County Superior Court	Glenn	**Willows**, Orland		
Humboldt County Superior Court	Humboldt	**Eureka**		
Imperial County Superior Court	Imperial	**El Centro (2)**, Brawley, Winterhaven		
Inyo County Superior Court	Inyo	**Independence**, Bishop		
Kern County Superior Court	Kern	**Bakersfield (5)**, Delano, Lake Isabella, Lamont, Mojave, Ridgecrest, Shafter, Taft		
Kings County Superior Court	Kings	**Hanford**		
Lake County Superior Court	Lake	**Lakeport**, Clearlake		
Lassen County Superior Court	Lassen	**Susanville**		
Los Angeles County Superior Court	Los Angeles	**Los Angeles (10)**, Alhambra, Avalon, Bellflower, Beverly Hills, Burbank, Chatsworth, Compton, Downey, El Monte, Glendale, Inglewood (2), Lancaster (2), Long Beach, Monterey Park, Norwalk, Pasadena, Pomona, San Fernando, Santa Clarita, Santa Monica, Sylmar (juvenile), Torrance, Van Nuys (2), West Covina, Whittier		
Madera County Superior Court	Madera	**Madera**		
Marin County Superior Court	Marin	**San Rafael**		
Mariposa County Superior Court	Mariposa	**Mariposa**		
Mendocino County Superior Court	Mendocino	**Ukiah**, Fort Bragg		
Merced County Superior Court	Merced	**Merced (4)**, Los Banos		
Modoc County Superior Court	Modoc	**Alturas**		
Mono County Superior Court	Mono	**Bridgeport**, Mammoth Lakes		
Monterey County Superior Court	Monterey	**Salinas (2)**, King City, Marina, Monterey		
Napa County Superior Court	Napa	**Napa (2)**		
Nevada County Superior Court	Nevada	**Nevada City**, Truckee		
Orange County Superior Court	Orange	**Santa Ana (3)**, Fullerton, Newport Beach, Orange, Westminster		
Placer County Superior Court	Placer	**Auburn (2)**, Roseville (2), Tahoe City		
Plumas County Superior Court	Plumas	**Quincy**, Portola (shared with Sierra)		
Riverside County Superior Court	Riverside	**Riverside (4)**, Banning, Blythe, Corona, Indio, Menifee, Moreno Valley, Murrieta (2), Palm Springs, Temecula		
Sacramento County Superior Court	Sacramento	**Sacramento (5)**		
San Benito County Superior Court	San Benito	**Hollister**		
San Bernardino County Superior Court	San Bernardino	**San Bernardino (5)**, Barstow, Big Bear Lake, Colton (mental health), Fontana, Joshua Tree, Needles, Rancho Cucamonga (2), Victorville		
San Diego County Superior Court	San Diego	**San Diego (3)**, Chula Vista, El Cajon, Kearny Mesa, Vista		
San Francisco County Superior Court	San Francisco	**San Francisco (4)**		
San Joaquin County Superior Court	San Joaquin	**Stockton**, French Camp (juvenile), Lodi, Manteca		
San Luis Obispo County Superior Court	San Luis Obispo	**San Luis Obispo (3)**, Grover Beach, Paso Robles		
San Mateo County Superior Court	San Mateo	**Redwood City**, San Mateo (juvenile), South San Francisco		
Santa Barbara County Superior Court	Santa Barbara	**Santa Barbara (3)**, Lompoc, Santa Maria (3), Solvang (traffic)		
Santa Clara County Superior Court	Santa Clara	**San Jose (5)**, Morgan Hill, Palo Alto (criminal), Santa Clara (traffic)		
Santa Cruz County Superior Court	Santa Cruz	**Santa Cruz**, Watsonville		
Shasta County Superior Court	Shasta	**Redding (2)**		
Sierra County Superior Court	Sierra	**Downieville**, Portola (shared with Plumas)		
Siskiyou County Superior Court	Siskiyou	**Yreka**		
Solano County Superior Court	Solano	**Fairfield (3)**, Vallejo		
Sonoma County Superior Court	Sonoma	**Santa Rosa (4)**		
Stanislaus County Superior Court	Stanislaus	**Modesto (4)**, Turlock		
Sutter County Superior Court	Sutter	**Yuba City**		
Tehama County Superior Court	Tehama	**Red Bluff (2)**		
Trinity County Superior Court	Trinity	**Weaverville**, Hayfork		
Tulare County Superior Court	Tulare	**Visalia (4)**, Dinuba, Porterville		
Tuolumne County Superior Court	Tuolumne	**Sonora (2)**		
Ventura County Superior Court	Ventura	**Ventura**, Oxnard (juvenile), Simi Valley		
Yolo County Superior Court	Yolo	**Woodland**		
Yuba County Superior Court	Yuba	**Marysville**		

== See also ==
- List of county courthouses in California
- Criminal procedure in California
- Judiciary of California
