= Napa County Superior Court =

California superior court with jurisdiction over Napa County

Superior Court of California, County of Napa
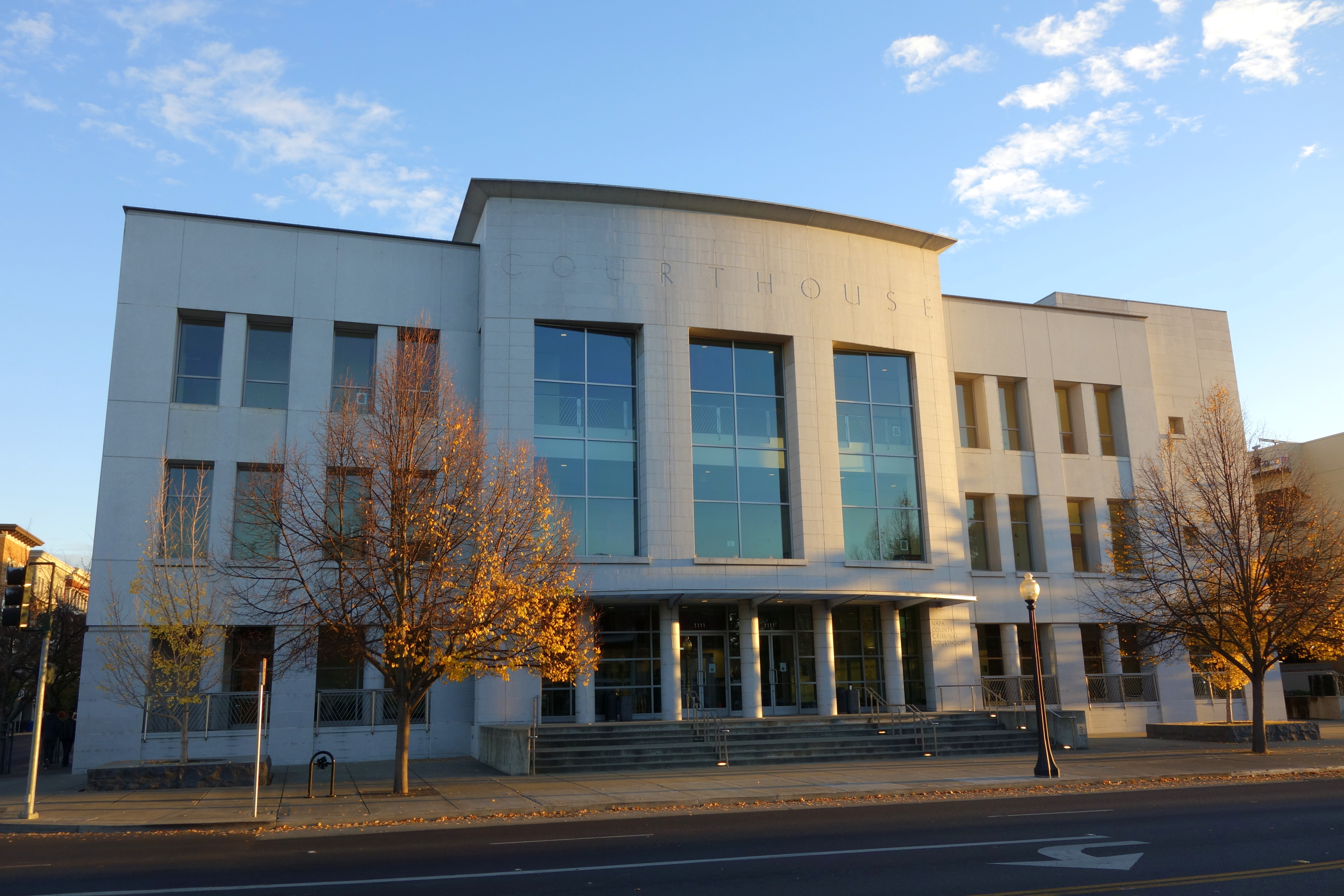
- Criminal Courthouse; 1111 Third St

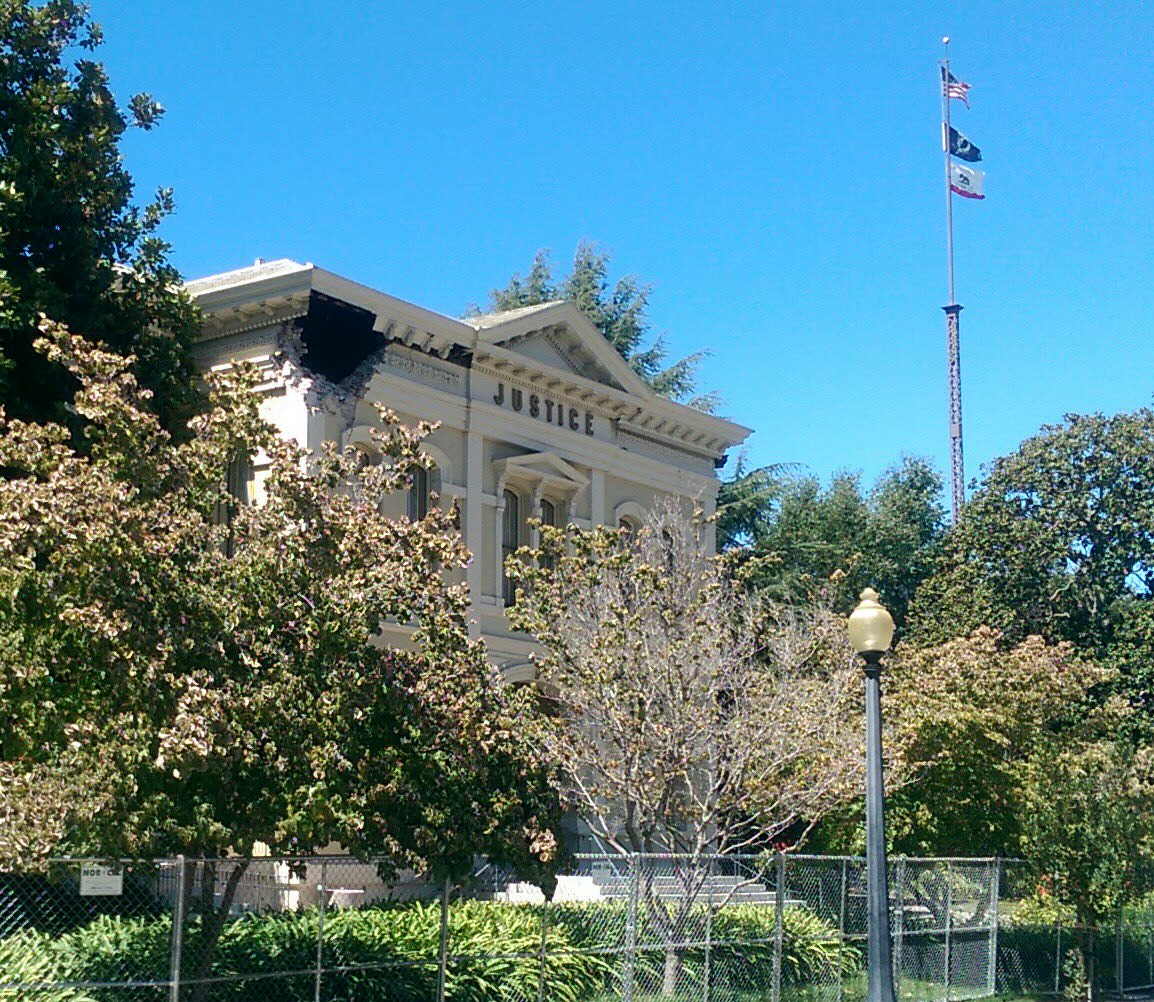
- Historic Courthouse; 825 Brown St
- Interactive map of Superior Court of California, County of Napa
- 38.29743°N 122.28448°W
- Established: 1850
- Jurisdiction: Napa County, California
- Location: Napa (county seat)
- Coordinates: 38.29743°N 122.28448°W
- Appeals to: California Court of Appeal for the First District
- Website: napa.courts.ca.gov

Presiding Judge
- Currently: Hon. Scott R.L. Young

Assistant Presiding Judge
- Currently: Hon. Joseph J. Solga

Court Executive Officer
- Currently: Robert E. Fleshman

The Superior Court of California, County of Napa, informally known as the Napa County Superior Court, is the California superior court with jurisdiction over Napa County.

== History ==
Napa County was one of the original counties formed when California assumed statehood in 1850. Napa was named the county seat.

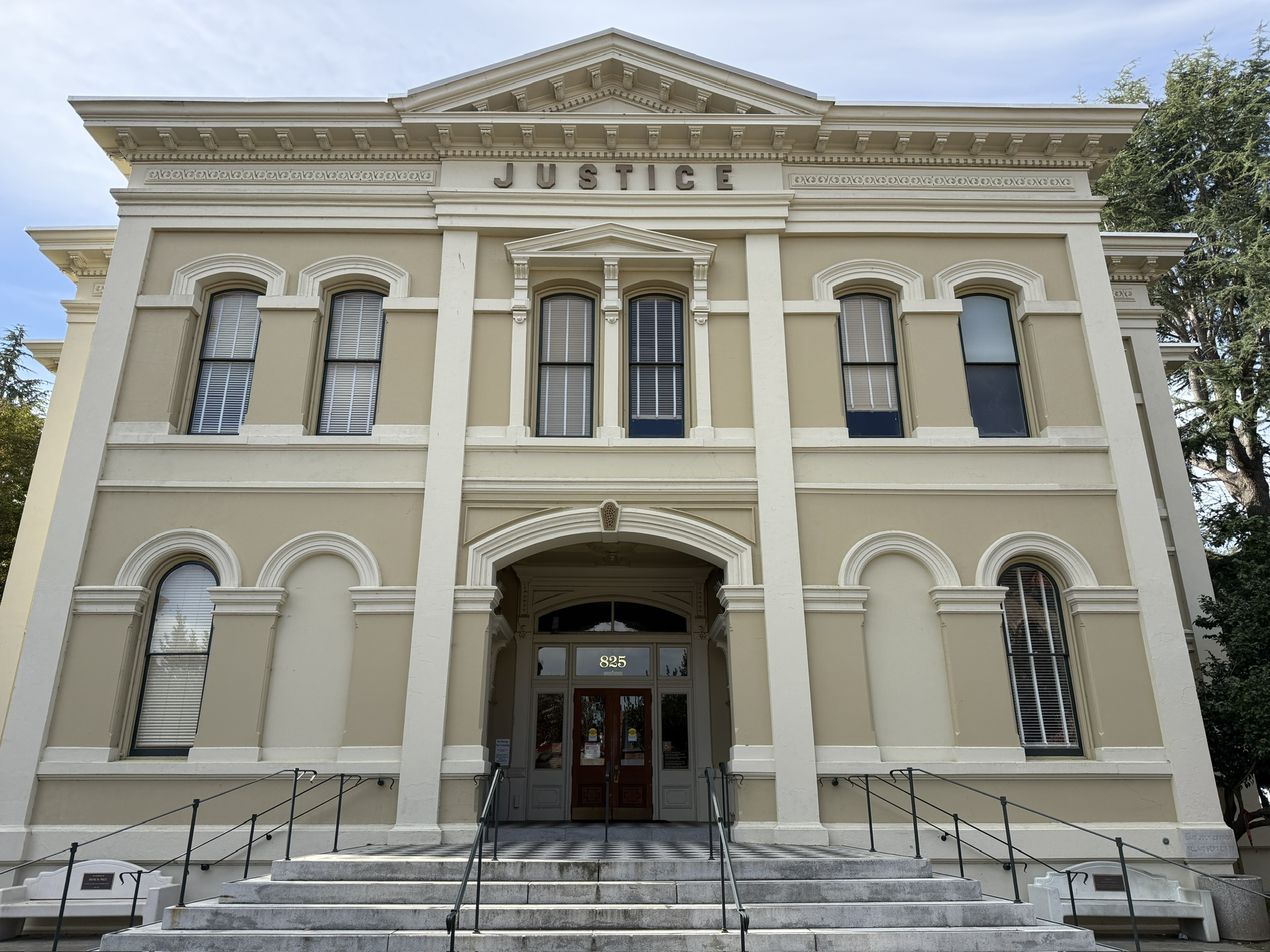
1879 Napa County Courthouse (2025)

The first courthouse was a small two-story building at the northwest corner of Coombs and Second. It was built in the eastern half of the United States and shipped around Cape Horn in 1849 by Mr. Ely, who subsequently practiced law in San Francisco. The first courthouse was used until 1855, when it was purchased by C. Hartson and subsequently R. Peddie; at one point it was moved to the east side of Main Street and used as a residence until it was destroyed by fire on August 25, 1875.

Plans were drawn up for a second courthouse by Webb & Kincade in 1855 and a bid was awarded in August 1855, but this was later rescinded by the County Board of Supervisors. In May 1856, the site for the second courthouse was chosen to be on the site of the first and the cornerstone was laid on July 29, 1856; it was completed and occupied by December of that year. The 1856 courthouse was purchased and moved off-site to clear the site for a third courthouse.

By 1876, planning began for a new courthouse. Plans were drawn up by Ira Gilchrist and the construction contract was awarded to John Cox on June 25, 1878. The cornerstone for the third courthouse was laid on September 21, 1878, and the building was accepted on February 17, 1879. The 1879 courthouse featured a tall cupola which survived the 1906 San Francisco earthquake, but was removed following another earthquake in 1931. The Hall of Records was added to the site of the courthouse in 1916, now known as the Napa County Courthouse Plaza. An expansion was attached to the 1879 courthouse in 1978.

Presently, most court operations are conducted in the newer Criminal Courthouse, completed in 1998. The historic courthouse was damaged in the 2014 South Napa earthquake.

== Venues ==
Napa County Superior Court locations:
1 825 Brown St (Historic)
2 1111 Third St (Criminal)
3 2350 Old Sonoma Rd (Juvenile)

Juvenile cases are heard at the Juvenile Courthouse, which reopened in April 2022 after a two-year shutdown due to the COVID-19 pandemic in California. Currently, only delinquency cases are being heard at the Juvenile Courthouse. Dependency and other family-related matters will still be handled at the downtown Napa courthouse locations.
