= Placer County Superior Court =

California superior court with jurisdiction over Placer Country

Superior Court of California, County of Placer
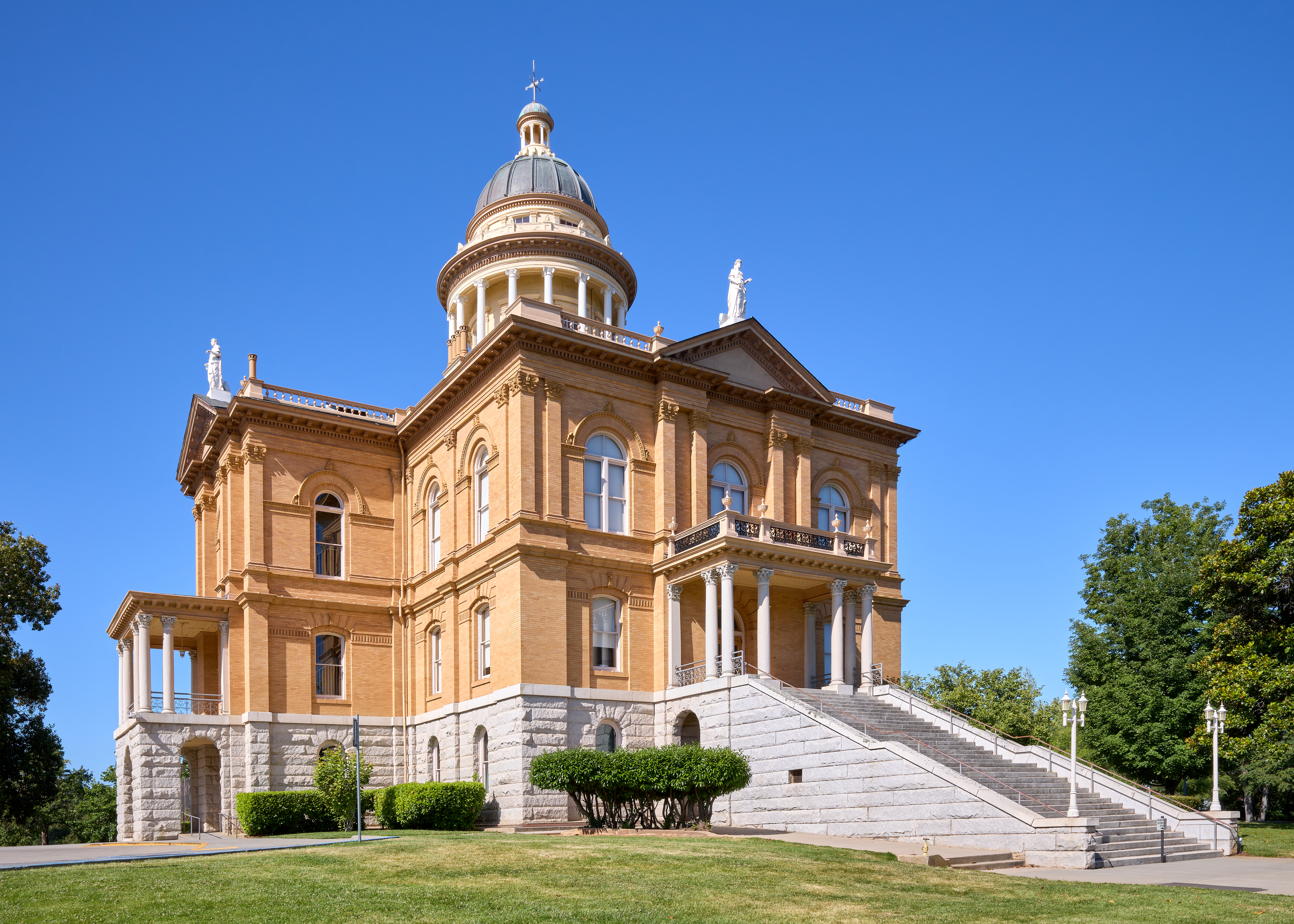
- Placer County Courthouse, June 2025
- Interactive map of Superior Court of California, County of Placer
- 38.807°N 121.303°W
- Established: 1848
- Jurisdiction: Placer County, California
- Location: Roseville
- Coordinates: 38.807°N 121.303°W
- Appeals to: California Court of Appeal for the Third District
- Website: placer.courts.ca.gov

Presiding Judge
- Currently: Hon. Jeffrey S. Penney

Assistant Presiding Judge
- Currently: Hon. Suzanne I. Gazzaniga

Court Executive Officer
- Currently: Jake Chatters

The Superior Court of California, County of Placer, is the California superior court with jurisdiction over Placer County. The main court was in the county seat of Auburn from its inception, with satellites in the county's townships, until it moved to Roseville in 2008.

== History ==
Placer County was one of the original counties formed in 1850 when California gained statehood.

The first Placer County Court was organized with a temporary wood and canvas courthouse erected in 1851 on Auburn's Court Street. A two-story wooden courthouse was built shortly thereafter and the Court of Sessions was held for the first time on December 10, 1853, in the new structure. In 1891, a grand jury report was released, stating "it is a deplorable fact that the condition of its public buildings is a disgrace to modern civilization and a reflection on our intelligent community."

A new courthouse was built on the site of the 1853 courthouse; the 1853 courthouse was moved aside on rollers and demolished in 1897, and the new courthouse complex (including a jail and a hall of records) was dedicated on July 4, 1898. Starting in 1953, additional courtrooms were created in leased buildings. The 1898 courthouse was refurbished from 1986 to 1990; staff were moved to the DeWitt Complex temporarily during the renovation, but the move became permanent due to a lack of space at the 1898 courthouse. Also in 1990, a court was opened at the main jail, and in 2000 a juvenile court was established.

From the start, a Justice of the Peace was named to conduct court hearings for each township in Placer County, including:

- Township 1 (Roseville), which had an additional location at the railroad depot
- Township 4 (Colfax)
- Township 5 (Foresthill)
- Township 8 (Tahoe City)
- Township 9 (Loomis)
- Township 10 (Lincoln)

In 2008, the court headquarters were moved to Roseville at the Santucci Justice Center.

== Venues ==
Placer County Superior Court locations:
1 Hon. Howard G. Gibson Courthouse, 10820 Justice Center Dr (Roseville)
Jail Courtroom, 11801 Go For Broke Rd (Rocklin)
2 Historic Courthouse, 101 Maple St (Auburn)
3 Juvenile Court, 11270 B Ave (Auburn)
4 Tahoe Courthouse, 2501 N Lake Blvd (Tahoe City)

The historic Placer County Courthouse is listed as a contributing property of the Old Auburn Historic District, which was added to the National Register of Historic Places in 1970.
