= Mariposa County Superior Court =

California superior court with jurisdiction over Mariposa County

Superior Court of California, County of Mariposa
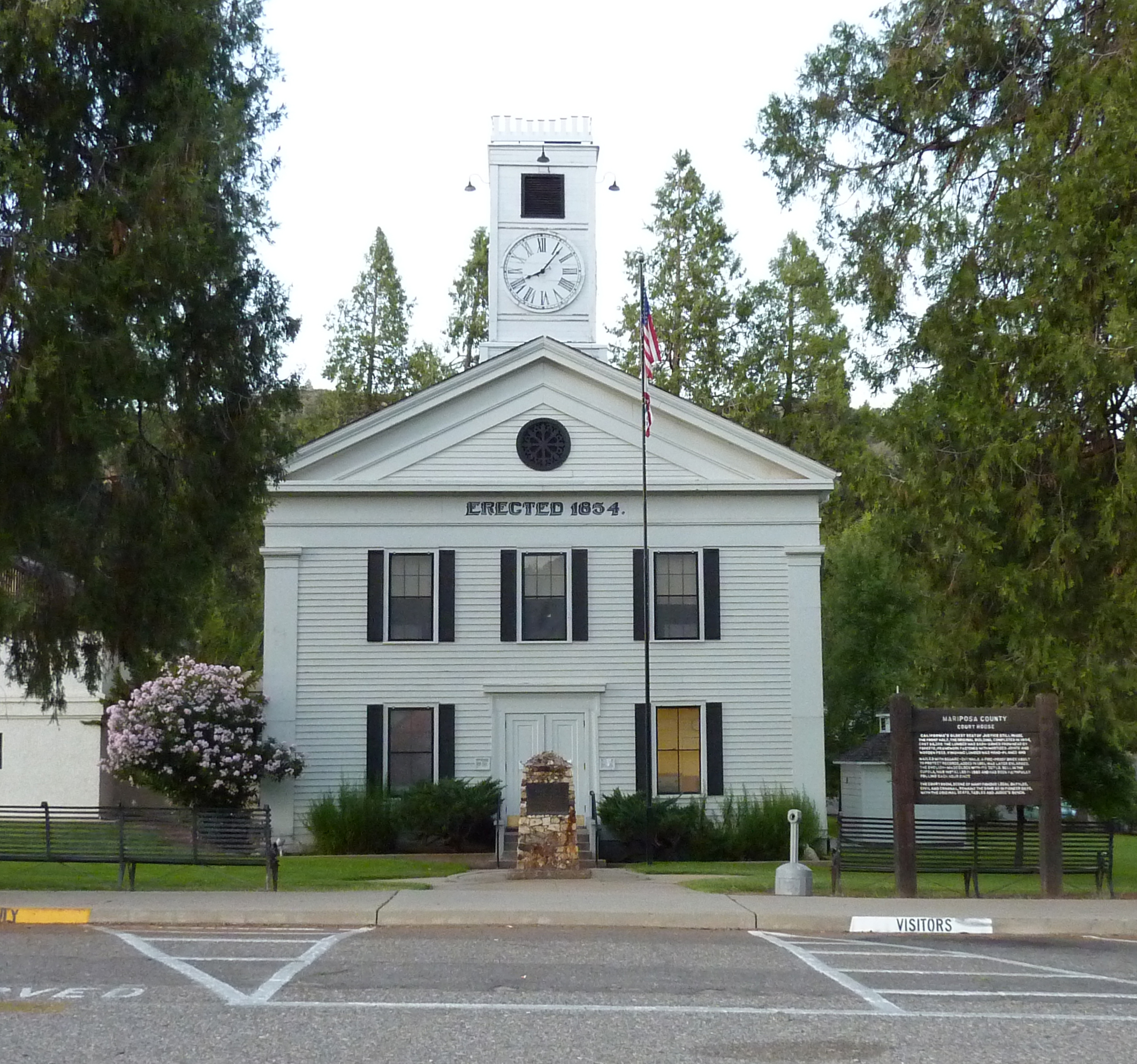
- 1854 Mariposa County Courthouse
- Interactive map of Superior Court of California, County of Mariposa
- 37.48898°N 119.96718°W
- Established: 1850
- Jurisdiction: Mariposa County, California
- Location: Mariposa (county seat)
- Coordinates: 37.48898°N 119.96718°W
- Appeals to: California Court of Appeal for the Fifth District
- Website: mariposa.courts.ca.gov

Presiding Judge
- Currently: Hon. Michael A. Fagalde

Assistant Presiding Judge
- Currently: Hon. Anita Starchman Bryant

Court Executive Officer
- Currently: Desiré Leard

The Superior Court of California, County of Mariposa, informally the Mariposa County Superior Court, is the California superior court with jurisdiction over Mariposa County.

== History ==
Mariposa County was one of the original counties established when California gained statehood in 1850. At the time, Mariposa occupied 1/5 of the entire area of California and Agua Fria was named the county seat, but it was moved to Mariposa in 1852. While Agua Fria held the seat, court and county business was conducted from the home of James Barney, the first county sheriff. After the seat was moved to Mariposa, court and county business was conducted at the homes of other county officers.

Construction of a permanent courthouse began in 1854, and it was completed in 1855 for approximately US$12,000 (equivalent to $400,000 in 2024). Perrin (P.V.) Fox prepared the plans for a fee of US$100, which the Court of Sessions adopted on June 21, 1854, and Fox built the courthouse with his partner A.F. Shriver for a winning bid of US$9000; the contract for construction was let on July 21, 1854. Wood for the courthouse was sourced from local pine forests and joined using mortise and tenon. The site of the courthouse originally belonged to John C. Fremont, who granted the land to the county after the courthouse had been built. The clock tower was added in 1866 to house a clock that had been imported from England. The clock continues to sound every quarter-hour. A small annex was constructed in 1900.

== Venues ==
Mariposa County Superior Court location:
1 5088 Boullion St (Mariposa)

The courthouse, completed in 1854, is the oldest courthouse in continuous service in California. It is the oldest courthouse west of the Mississippi. It was named California Historical Landmark No. 670 in 1958 and listed on the National Register of Historic Places in 1977.
