= List of county courthouses in California =

Counties of California
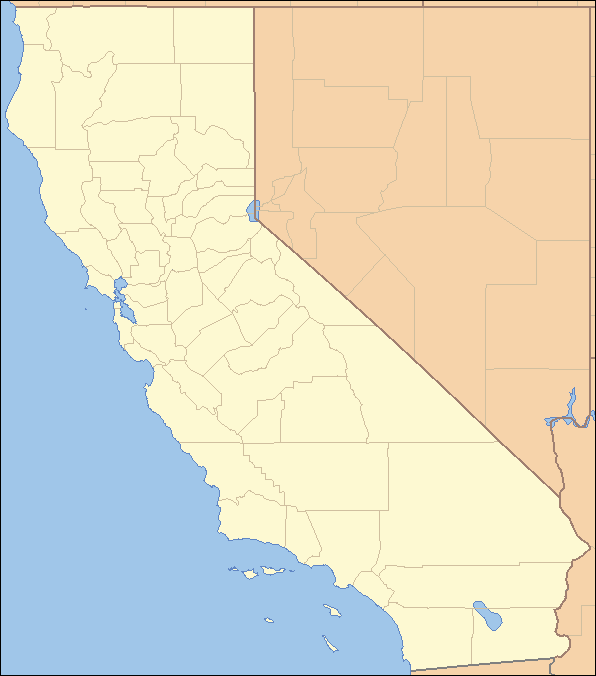

This is a list of county courthouses and other non-federal courthouses in California, both current and former. For federal courthouses located in California, see List of United States federal courthouses in California.

The U.S. state of California has 58 counties. Following the U.S. conquest of California, it was divided into 27 counties on 18 February 1850. Between 1860 and 1907, the original 27 counties were subdivided into the current 58 counties.

Courthouses often reflect the Californian architectural styles that were popular at the time they were built, including Neoclassical, Spanish Colonial Revival, Beaux-Arts, Italianate, and Art Moderne styles. Mariposa County Courthouse is California's oldest courthouse, built in 1854.

== List ==
- Note: Most state trial courts in California with general jurisdiction are known as Superior Courts.

=== Alameda County ===
Courthouse	Image	County	Location	Built	Notes
Alvarado Courthouse		Alameda	Alvarado	1853	
San Leandro Courthouse		Alameda	San Leandro	1855	
Third Alameda County Courthouse		Alameda	Oakland	1875	
René C. Davidson Courthouse		Alameda	Oakland	1935	
Hayward Hall of Justice		Alameda	Hayward	1974	

=== Alpine County ===
Courthouse	Image	County	Location	Built	Notes
Alpine County Courthouse		Alpine	Markleeville; 38°41′40″N 119°46′43″W	1928	Kept to a one-story design due to cost considerations, designed by Frederic Joseph DeLongchamps, NRHP-listed (refnum 4001074).

=== Amador County ===
Courthouse	Image	County	Location	Built	Notes
Amador County Courthouse		Amador	Jackson		

=== Butte County ===
Courthouse	Image	County	Location	Built	Notes
North Butte County Courthouse		Butte	Chico	2015	

=== Calaveras County ===
Courthouse	Image	County	Location	Built	Notes
Calaveras County Courthouse		Calaveras	San Andreas; 38°11′48″N 120°40′45″W	1867	Executions once took place in same building. Now a museum, NRHP-listed in 1972 (refnum 72000221).

=== Colusa County ===
Courthouse	Image	County	Location	Built	Notes
Colusa County Courthouse		Colusa	Colusa		

=== Contra Costa County ===
Courthouse	Image	County	Location	Built	Notes
Contra Costa County Courthouse		Contra Costa	625 Court St., Martinez; 38°01′07″N 122°08′04″W	1901	Former courthouse, now the Contra Costa County Finance Building. NRHP-listed (refnum 89002113).
Wakefield Taylor Courthouse		Contra Costa	Martinez	1932	

=== Del Norte County ===
Courthouse	Image	County	Location	Built	Notes
Del Norte County Courthouse		Del Norte	Crescent City		

=== El Dorado County ===
Courthouse	Image	County	Location	Built	Notes
El Dorado County Courthouse		El Dorado	Placerville		

=== Fresno County ===
Courthouse	Image	County	Location	Built	Notes
Original Fresno County Courthouse		Fresno	Fresno	1875	Demolished in 1966.
Fresno County Courthouse		Fresno	Fresno	1966	

=== Glenn County ===
Courthouse	Image	County	Location	Built	Notes
Glenn County Courthouse		Glenn	Willows	1894	

=== Humboldt County ===
Courthouse	Image	County	Location	Built	Notes
Humboldt County Courthouse		Humboldt	Eureka	1956	

=== Imperial County ===
Courthouse	Image	County	Location	Built	Notes
Imperial County Courthouse		Imperial	El Centro	1924	

=== Inyo County ===
Courthouse	Image	County	Location	Built	Notes
Inyo County Courthouse		Inyo	Independence; 36°48′13″N 118°11′56″W	1921	Classical Revival architecture, designed by William H. Weeks, NRHP-listed (refnum 97001664).

=== Kern County ===
Courthouse	Image	County	Location	Built	Notes
Havilah Courthouse		Kern	Havilah	1868	
First Kern County Courthouse		Kern	Bakersfield	1896	
Second Kern County Courthouse		Kern	Bakersfield	1912	
Kern County Courthouse		Kern	Bakersfield	1959	

=== Kings County ===
Courthouse	Image	County	Location	Built	Notes
Kings County Courthouse		Kings	Hanford; 36°19′40″N 119°38′45″W	1896	Expanded in 1914, it served as county's courthouse until 1976. NRHP-listed (refnum 78003063).

=== Lake County ===
Courthouse	Image	County	Location	Built	Notes
Lake County Courthouse		Lake	Lakeport; 39°2′36″N 122°55′2″W	1870	Now a museum, it survived the 1906 San Francisco earthquake and served until 1968. NRHP-listed (refnum 70000134).

=== Lassen County ===
Courthouse	Image	County	Location	Built	Notes
Lassen County Court House		Lassen	Susanville; 40°24′59″N 120°39′45″W	1917	NRHP-listed (refnum 97001659).

=== Los Angeles County ===
Courthouse	Image	County	Location	Built	Notes
Clocktower Courthouse		Los Angeles	Los Angeles	1858	
Red Stone Courthouse		Los Angeles	Los Angeles	1891	
Hall of Justice		Los Angeles	Los Angeles; 34.056°N 118.243°W	1925	
Spring Street Courthouse		Los Angeles	Los Angeles; 34.0550°N 118.2414°W	1940	
Stanley Mosk Courthouse		Los Angeles	Los Angeles; 34.0552178°N 118.2468222°W	1958	
Clara Shortridge Foltz Criminal Justice Center		Los Angeles	210 West Temple Street; Los Angeles; 34.054986°N 118.24346°W	1972	

=== Madera County ===
Courthouse	Image	County	Location	Built	Notes
Madera County Courthouse		Madera	Madera; 36°57′34″N 120°3′39″W	1900	Served the county until 1953. Now a museum. NRHP-listed (refnum 71000162).
Millerton Courthouse		Madera	Millerton	1867	First courthouse in Fresno County, before Madera County seceded from Fresno County.

=== Marin County ===
Courthouse	Image	County	Location	Built	Notes
Marin County Civic Center		Marin	San Rafael	1962	Designed by Frank Lloyd Wright

=== Mariposa ===
Courthouse	Image	County	Location	Built	Notes
Mariposa County Courthouse		Mariposa	Mariposa; 37°29′20″N 119°57′59″W	1854	NRHP-listed (refnum 77000306).

=== Mendocino County ===
Courthouse	Image	County	Location	Built	Notes
Mendocino County Courthouse		Mendocino	Ukiah		

=== Merced County ===
Courthouse	Image	County	Location	Built	Notes
Merced County Courthouse		Merced	Merced; 37°18′22″N 120°29′00″W	1875	Served as courthouse until 1975. Now a museum. NRHP-listed (refnum 75000441).

=== Modoc County ===
Courthouse	Image	County	Location	Built	Notes
Modoc County Courthouse		Modoc	Alturas	1912	

=== Mono County ===
Courthouse	Image	County	Location	Built	Notes
Mono County Courthouse		Mono	Bridgeport; 38°15′22″N 119°13′39″W	1880	NRHP-listed (refnum 74000536).

=== Monterey County ===
Courthouse	Image	County	Location	Built	Notes
Colton Hall		Monterey	Monterey	1849	
First Monterey County Court House		Monterey	Salinas	1878	
Monterey County Court House		Monterey	Salinas; 36°40′25″N 121°39′26″W	1937	Art Moderne. WPA-funded. NRHP-listed (refnum 08000878).

=== Napa County ===
Courthouse	Image	County	Location	Built	Notes
Napa County Courthouse Plaza		Napa	Napa; 38°17′51″N 122°17′4″W	1878	NRHP-listed (refnum 92000778).
Napa County Criminal Courthouse		Napa	Napa	1998	.

=== Nevada County ===
Courthouse	Image	County	Location	Built	Notes
Nevada County Superior Courthouse		Nevada	Nevada City	1864	

=== Orange County ===
Courthouse	Image	County	Location	Built	Notes
Old Orange County Courthouse		Orange	Santa Ana; 33°45′01″N 117°52′09″W	1900	NRHP-listed (refnum 77000321).
Orange County Courthouse		Orange	Santa Ana	1968	

=== Placer County ===
Courthouse	Image	County	Location	Built	Notes
Placer County Superior Courthouse		Placer	Auburn	1898	

=== Plumas County ===
Courthouse	Image	County	Location	Built	Notes
First Plumas County Superior Courthouse		Plumas	Quincy	1859	
Plumas County Superior Courthouse		Plumas	Quincy	1921	
Portola Regional Courthouse		Plumas & Sierra	Portola	2009	Only courthouse in California serving two counties: Sierra & Plumas

=== Riverside County ===
Courthouse	Image	County	Location	Built	Notes
Riverside County Superior Courthouse		Riverside	Riverside	1904	

=== Sacramento County ===
Courthouse	Image	County	Location	Built	Notes
First Sacramento County Courthouse		Sacramento	Sacramento	1852	
Second Sacramento County Courthouse		Sacramento	Sacramento	1855	
Third Sacramento County Courthouse		Sacramento	Sacramento	1910	
Sacramento County Courthouse		Sacramento	Sacramento	1965	

=== San Benito County ===
Courthouse	Image	County	Location	Built	Notes
San Benito County Courthouse		San Benito	Hollister	1888	
San Benito County Courthouse		San Benito	Hollister	1963	
San Benito County Court House		San Benito	Hollister	2014	

=== San Bernardino County ===
Courthouse	Image	County	Location	Built	Notes
San Bernardino County Court House		San Bernardino	San Bernardino; 34°6′20″N 117°17′26″W	1927	Classical Revival. NRHP-listed (refnum 97001632).

=== San Diego County ===
Courthouse	Image	County	Location	Built	Notes
First San Diego County Court House		San Diego	San Diego	1850	
Second San Diego County Court House		San Diego	San Diego	1872	
Third San Diego County Court House		San Diego	San Diego	1892	
Fourth San Diego County Court House		San Diego	San Diego	1962	
South County Regional Center		San Diego	Chula Vista		
San Diego Hall of Justice		San Diego	San Diego	2016	

=== San Francisco County ===
Courthouse	Image	County	Location	Built	Notes
First San Francisco Hall of Justice		San Francisco	San Francisco	1901	
San Francisco Hall of Justice		San Francisco	San Francisco	1960	
San Francisco County Court House		San Francisco	San Francisco	1997	

=== San Joaquin County ===
Courthouse	Image	County	Location	Built	Notes
First San Joaquin County Court House		San Joaquin	San Joaquin	1854	
Second San Joaquin County Court House		San Joaquin	San Joaquin	1890	

=== San Luis Obispo County ===
Courthouse	Image	County	Location	Built	Notes
First San Luis Obispo County Court House		San Luis Obispo	San Luis Obispo	1872	
San Luis Obispo County Court House		San Luis Obispo	San Luis Obispo	1940	

=== San Mateo County ===
Courthouse	Image	County	Location	Built	Notes
San Mateo County Courthouse		San Mateo	Redwood City; 37°29′13″N 122°13′47″W		Now a museum. NRHP-listed (refnum 77000340).

=== Santa Barbara County ===
Courthouse	Image	County	Location	Built	Notes
Santa Barbara County Courthouse		Santa Barbara	Santa Barbara; 34°25′27.66″N 119°42′8.86″W	1926	NRHP-listed (refnum 81000177).

=== Santa Clara County ===
Courthouse	Image	County	Location	Built	Notes
Old Santa Clara County Courthouse		Santa Clara	St. James Park; San Jose	1868	
Downtown San Jose Superior Court		Santa Clara	St. James Park; San Jose	1964	
Palo Alto Courthouse		Santa Clara	Palo Alto		
Santa Clara County Hall of Justice		Santa Clara	San Jose	1991	
Santa Clara County Family Justice Center		Santa Clara	St. James Park; San Jose	2016	

=== Santa Cruz County ===
Courthouse	Image	County	Location	Built	Notes
Eagle Hotel Courthouse		Santa Cruz	Santa Cruz	1850	
First Santa Cruz County Courthouse		Santa Cruz	Santa Cruz	1867	
Cooper House Courthouse		Santa Cruz	Santa Cruz	1896	

=== Shasta County ===
Courthouse	Image	County	Location	Built	Notes
First Shasta County Courthouse		Shasta	Shasta	1855	
Second Shasta County Courthouse		Shasta	Redding	1889	
Third Shasta County Courthouse		Shasta	Redding	1956	
Fourth Shasta County Courthouse		Shasta	Redding	2024	

=== Sierra County ===
Courthouse	Image	County	Location	Built	Notes
First Sierra County Courthouse		Sierra	Downieville	1854	
Sierra County Courthouse		Sierra	Downieville	1953	
Portola Regional Courthouse		Sierra & Plumas	Portola	2009	Only courthouse in California serving two counties: Sierra & Plumas

=== Siskiyou County ===
Courthouse	Image	County	Location	Built	Notes
Siskiyou County Courthouse		Siskiyou	Yreka		

=== Solano County ===
Courthouse	Image	County	Location	Built	Notes
Old Solano County Courthouse		Solano	Fairfield	1911	
Solano County Hall of Justice		Solano	Fairfield	1970	

=== Sonoma County ===
Courthouse	Image	County	Location	Built	Notes
Sonoma County Hall of Justice		Sonoma	Santa Rosa	2025	

=== Stanislaus County ===
Courthouse	Image	County	Location	Built	Notes
Stanislaus County Courthouse		Stanislaus	Modesto	1873	

=== Sutter County ===
Courthouse	Image	County	Location	Built	Notes
Sutter County Courthouse		Sutter	Yuba City		

=== Tehama County ===
Courthouse	Image	County	Location	Built	Notes
Tehama County Courthouse		Tehama	Red Bluff		

=== Trinity County ===
Courthouse	Image	County	Location	Built	Notes
Trinity County Courthouse		Trinity	Weaverville		

=== Tulare County ===
Courthouse	Image	County	Location	Built	Notes
Tulare County Courthouse		Tulare	Visalia	1876	

=== Tuolumne County ===
Courthouse	Image	County	Location	Built	Notes
Tuolumne County Courthouse		Tuolumne	Sonora; 37°59′08″N 120°22′59″W		NRHP-listed (refnum 81000182).

=== Ventura County ===
Courthouse	Image	County	Location	Built	Notes
Ventura County Courthouse		Ventura	501 Poli St., Ventura; 34°16′57″N 119°17′32″W	1912	Overlooks city of Ventura, now serves as its city hall. NRHP-listed (refnum 71000211).

=== Yolo County ===
Courthouse	Image	County	Location	Built	Notes
Yolo County Courthouse		Yolo	725 Court St., Woodland	1917	William Henry Weeks-designed. Served as courthouse until 2015. NRHP-listed (refnum 86003660).

=== Yuba County ===
Courthouse	Image	County	Location	Built	Notes
Yuba County Courthouse		Yuba	Marysville	1855	

== See also ==
- List of United States federal courthouses in California
- List of courthouses in the United States
