= Sonoran =

Sonoran(s) may refer to:

- Something derived from or related to the State of Sonora in the country of Mexico, in North America
  - Sonoran people from the Mexican State of Sonora and their descendants
  - Places or things in the Mexican State of Sonora like the Sonoran Desert or Sonoran cuisine
- People or things from Sonora, California
