= Foothill Horizons Outdoor School =

School in Sonora, California, United States

Location
- Sonora, Tuolumne County, California; United States; 38°1′12″N 120°19′28″W

Information
- School district: Stanislaus County Office of Education
- Superintendent: Tom Changnon
- Head of school: Pam Ivie
- Website: http://www.foothillhorizons.com/

Foothill Horizons Outdoor School is an outdoor school located in Sonora, California. The center's formal name is Neal E. Wade Outdoor Education Center. It is operated by the Stanislaus County Office of Education. Stanislaus County Office of Education has been operating an Outdoor Education program for over 50 years.

The current director is Jessica Hewitt.
