= The full catastrophe =

Humorous phrase

The full catastrophe is a comic phrase usually used to characterize any kind of disaster.

== Origin ==
The phrase appears in the 1964 film Zorba the Greek, where it is spoken by the character Zorba (played by Anthony Quinn), a colorful Greek with a zest for life. Zorba has insinuated himself into the employ of Basil (Alan Bates), a bookish Englishman who has inherited a mine in Crete. In a boat on their way to the island, Basil asks Zorba if he is married. Zorba laments, in accented English, "Am I not a man? And is not a man stupid? I'm a man, so I'm married. Wife, children, house—everything. The full catastrophe."

The English screenplay, written by the film's Greek Cypriot director Michael Cacoyannis, is based on the 1946 novel of the same title by Nikos Kazantzakis. The phrase "the full catastrophe" does not actually occur in the novel, but the screenplay dialogue above blends and condenses the language of two distinct scenes in the novel. In the first, the narrator, having just met Zorba, asks him if he is married. Zorba: "Aren't I a man? I mean blind. Like everyone else before me, I fell headlong into the ditch. I married. I took the road downhill. I became head of a family, I built a house, I had children—trouble!" Later, when Basil asks Zorba how many times he has been married, he responds, "What are you delving into now? D'you think I'm not a man? Like everyone else, I've committed the Great Folly. That's what I call marriage—may married folk forgive me! Yes, I've committed the Great Folly—I've married!" In a 2011 interview, Cacoyannis, who was fluent in English, said that in writing the script he consciously chose the non-idiomatic expression "the full catastrophe" for Zorba for the sake of "humor and impact".

== Use in popular culture ==
"The full catastrophe" in uses after the film most commonly refers to the stresses of marriage and family life, but it has been used in broader senses as well.

- The Full Catastrophe is the title of a comic novel by David Carkeet, published in 1990, which focuses on verbal strife in marriage. A play adaptation of the novel by Michael Weller bears the same title; the play premiered in 2015.
- Full Catastrophe Living, also published in 1990, is a best-selling guide to reducing stress, written by Jon Kabat-Zinn. The book redefines Zorba's "full catastrophe" as something positive, an affirmation of life's variety and chaos to be embraced, not lamented.
- "The Full Catastrophe" is a song by American rock singer/composer John Mellencamp in his 1996 album Mr. Happy Go Lucky, in his 1999 collection Rough Harvest, and in his 2010 boxed set On the Rural Route 7609.
- Full Catastrophe Living is a 2009 poetry collection by the American poet Zach Savich. The book won the 2008 Iowa Poetry Prize.
- In 2012, the American folk duo The Nields titled a song and album The Full Catastrophe.
- The 2015 British sitcom Catastrophe, starring Sharon Horgan and Rob Delaney, draws its title from the Zorba quote.
- The Full Catastrophe is a 2015 nonfiction book by James Angelos about Greek culture with emphasis on the country's recent debt crisis.
- The Full Catastrophe is a 2016 memoir by Karen Elizabeth Lee.
- The Full Catastrophe: Stories From When Life Was So Bad It Was Funny, edited by Rebecca Huntley and Sara Macdonald, is a 2019 comic collection of true stories by Australians of unfortunate incidents.
- The Full Catastrophe: All I Ever Wanted, Everything I Feared is a 2025 memoir, written by Casey Mulligan Walsh and published by Motina Books, about the search for belonging, finding meaning in the wake of repeated loss, and learning to live with grief beside joy.
