= David Carkeet =

American novelist and essayist (born 1946)

- Born: November 15, 1946 (age 79); Sonora, California, U.S.
- Education: University of California, Davis (BA); University of California, Berkeley; University of Wisconsin–Madison (MA); Indiana University Bloomington (PhD)
- Occupations: Novelist; essayist
- Spouse: Barbara Lubin (m. 1975)
- Children: 3

David Carkeet (born November 15, 1946, Sonora, California) is an American novelist and essayist. Three of his novels have been named The New York Times Book Review Notable Books of the Year.

== Biography ==
Carkeet grew up in the small northern California town where he was born and attended the University of California at Davis and Berkeley, graduating from the Davis campus with a B.A. degree in German in 1968. He received an M.A. in English literature from the University of Wisconsin–Madison in 1970 and a Ph.D. in English linguistics from Indiana University Bloomington in 1973. From 1973 to 2002 he taught writing and linguistics at the University of Missouri–St. Louis. He married Barbara Lubin of Elmira, New York, in 1975, and they raised three daughters, Anne, Laurie, and Molly. He has lived in Middlesex, Vermont, since 2003.

== Books ==
Carkeet has written six novels for adults, two novels for young adults, and one memoir. A comic writer in the vein of Kingsley Amis, David Lodge, and Peter De Vries, he is best known for his three novels featuring a linguist named Jeremy Cook as the protagonist:

- Double Negative (Dial, 1980), in which Jeremy Cook tries to solve a murder mystery while simultaneously studying language acquisition in toddlers at The Wabash Institute, a southern Indiana daycare center/research facility.
- The Full Catastrophe (Simon and Schuster, 1990), in which Cook, working for a marriage counseling service known as The Pillow Agency, moves in with a St. Louis couple to study their communication troubles.
- The Error of Our Ways (Holt, 1997), in this novel Cook comes to grips with the blunders that have defined his life.

Carkeet's other novels treat a range of subjects:

- The Greatest Slump of All Time (Harper and Row, 1984), a comic novel about a depressed baseball team.
- I Been There Before (Harper and Row, 1985), which brings Mark Twain back to life with the 1985 return of Halley's Comet.
- From Away (Overlook, 2010), in which an imposter from out-of-state ("from away" in Vermont parlance) assumes a missing Vermonter's identity.

Two of Carkeet's novels are mysteries (Double Negative and From Away), and mystery figures importantly in his two young adult novels, set in the Sierra foothills of his youth - The Silent Treatment and Quiver River (Harper and Row, 1988, 1991).

Carkeet's novel The Full Catastrophe has been adapted for the stage by Michael Weller. The play premiered in 2015 at the Contemporary American Theater Festival.

=== Memoir ===
Carkeet's memoir, Campus Sexpot (University of Georgia Press, 2005), tells of the impact on his life made by a 1961 novel of the same name written by a former English teacher at his high school. In it, a busty co-ed seduces her English instructor. Carkeet's Campus Sexpot also details the impact the book had on Sonora, California, where he grew up. The town in which the original novel is set, the fictional burg of Wattsville, sounds much like Sonora, and some of the characters' names are virtually identical to the names of actual Sonorans. Carkeet's Campus Sexpot has generated some controversy, with some of the original author's descendants objecting to Carkeet's portrayal of him. In addition to inspiring Carkeet's memoir, the original novel generated a fictional sequel, From Roundheel To Revolutionary: Linda Franklin After Campus Sexpot, by Jeff Daiell.

== Plays ==
Carkeet has adapted selected Mark Twain works into stage plays--"Buck Fanshaw's Funeral," "Cannibalism in the Cars," "The McWilliamses and the Burglar Alarm," and others. They have had several staged readings and productions in the U.S. and in France.

== Short works ==
Carkeet has written some three dozen general interest essays for The Village Voice, The New York Times Magazine, Smithsonian, Poets & Writers, The Oxford American, and the online journals Salon and The Morning News. In the 1990s he was a regular columnist for St. Louis magazine. His short stories have appeared in North American Review, Kansas Quarterly, and Carolina Quarterly. His critical and scholarly production includes an often-cited analysis of the dialects in Mark Twain's Adventures of Huckleberry Finn

== Honors ==
In 1981, Carkeet was nominated for an Edgar Award in the first-novel category by the Mystery Writers of America for Double Negative, published the year before. He won an O. Henry Award in 1982 for "The Greatest Slump of All Time," a short story originally published in Carolina Quarterly that he later expanded into the novel of the same title. He received a creative writing fellowship from the National Endowment for the Arts in 1983, and he won the Creative Nonfiction Award from the Association of Writers & Writing Programs in 2004.
