= Sierra County Superior Court =

California superior court with jurisdiction over Sierra County

Superior Court of California, County of Sierra
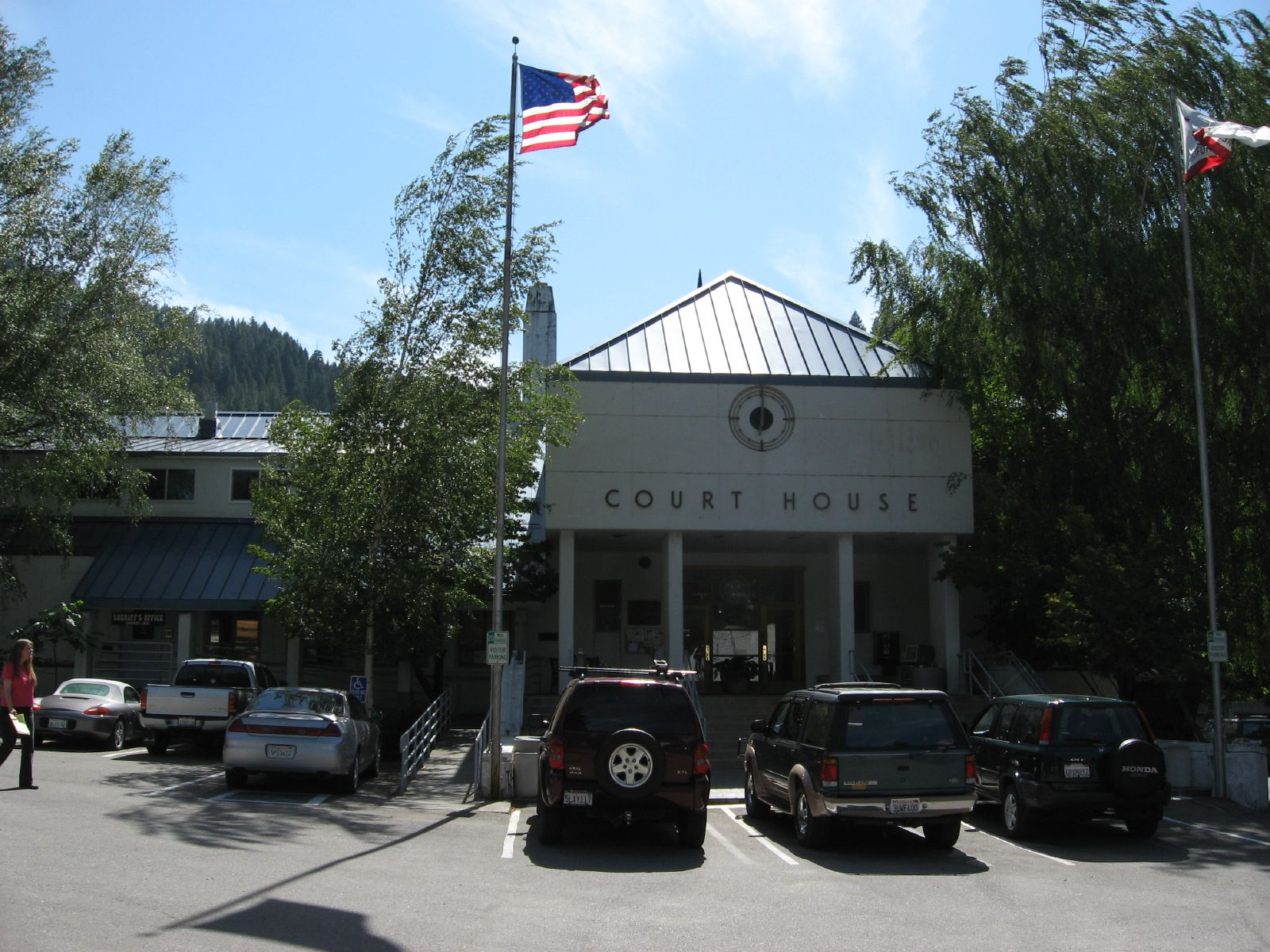
- Sierra County Courthouse (2007)
- Interactive map of Superior Court of California, County of Sierra
- 39.55886°N 120.83023°W
- Established: 1852
- Jurisdiction: Sierra County, California
- Location: Downieville
- Coordinates: 39.55886°N 120.83023°W
- Appeals to: California Court of Appeal for the Third District
- Website: sierra.courts.ca.gov

Presiding Judge
- Currently: Hon. Charles H. Ervin

Assistant Presiding Judge
- Currently: Hon. John "Jason" LaChance

Court Executive Officer
- Currently: Shannon Pedotti

The Superior Court of California, County of Sierra, informally known as the Sierra County Superior Court, is the California superior court with jurisdiction over Sierra County.

== History ==
Sierra County was partitioned from Yuba County in 1852; the county seat was Downieville. Because Yuba County was so large, a satellite court was established at Downieville, with justice administered by Richard Galloway, succeeded by Thomas Graham in 1851. After Sierra County was formed, the first County Judge elected in June 1852 was Ferdinand J. McCann. Judge McCann organized the Court of Sessions in July and appointed associate judges H.G. Brown and A.S. McMillen. The first session of the County Court was held on March 7, 1853. McCann later resigned in 1854, and S.J. Pettibone was appointed by Governor John Bigler to serve the remainder of the term, but Pettibone resigned in October 1854 and was succeeded by P.C. Schaffer. Judge Alanson Smith won the office in the election of 1855, and served until 1860, when he was succeeded by Judges William Campbell (1860–63), Samuel B. Davidson (1863–68), Garland Harris (1868–72), D.H. Cowen (1872–75), and A.J. Howe (1875–79). The new California constitution was adopted in 1879 and the superior court replaced both the district and county court system.

Sierra County was placed in the tenth judicial district in 1853 along with Yuba, Nevada, and Sutter counties, with Judge William T. Barbour holding the first district court session in Downieville on July 5, 1853; in succeeding years, Sierra would be moved to the fourteenth (1855; Nevada, Sierra, and Plumas counties), then the seventeenth (1859; Sierra and Plumas) judicial districts. The fourteenth district held court in Nevada City; when Sierra moved to the seventeenth, the district court returned to Downieville and Governor John B. Weller appointed Judge Peter Van Clief to the bench. He was succeeded by Hon. Robert H. Taylor, who won the election in 1859; he was succeeded in turn by Hon. L.E. Pratt (1862). In April 1863, the districts were again reorganized, with Sierra joining Yuba, Sutter, and Colusa counties in the tenth judicial district, and the district court did not return to Downieville until that organization was abolished in favor of the current Superior Court system in 1879.

A committee of three was appointed by the Court of Sessions on August 3, 1853, to prepare specifications for the county jail; their report, submitted on August 18, was subject to further changes because of "the numerous criminals whom it was highly important should be temporarily deprived of their liberty" and on October 14, the court tabled the plans and appropriated $500 for a temporary jail. Deliberations resumed on a new courthouse and jail on March 14, 1854, which was designed by a committee of H.B. Cossitt, Benjamin Hall, Alanson Smith, and D.G. Webber. The contract for the new justice buildings was awarded to D.G. Webber for $12,975; the jail was completed by August and the courthouse by December, but it was not occupied until May 6, 1855, when the county board of supervisors accepted the buildings. The Sierra County Sheriff's Gallows was erected next to the courthouse for the hanging of James O'Neal on November 26, 1885, then dismantled and stored in the attic until 1927, when it was rediscovered and reinstalled despite not being "conducive to happy thoughts".

The 1854 courthouse was destroyed by a fire on September 20, 1947; it was first discovered half an hour after midnight by the sheriff, who had living quarters in the south end of the building. By the time firefighters were able to get their pumps working, the building was completely engulfed in flames, and the efforts were aimed at limiting the spread of the fire to adjacent buildings. The cause was attributed to defective wiring. A fireproof safe was saved after employees poured water over it; the safe is on display at the Kentucky Mine Museum in Sierra City. The county's cash was saved because the clerk, Margaret Elaine Blasdell Lambert, put it in the safe each night; the county records were also saved as they were stored nightly in a vault with rock walls two feet thick. A replacement courthouse, which is still in use, was completed in 1953 by Paul I. Jenks to a design by architect George Sellon.

== Venues ==
Sierra County Superior Court locations:
1 Downieville, 100 Courthouse Sq
2 Portola, 600 S Gulling St (joint Plumas/Sierra)
3 Loyalton, 604 Main St (closed)

On December 7, 2009, the Plumas/Sierra Regional Courthouse was opened in Portola, replacing part-time courthouses in that city and Loyalton. It is the first California courthouse jointly operated by two superior court jurisdictions: those of Sierra and Plumas counties.
