= Jack Cassinetto =

American painter

- Known for: Painting
- Notable work: Summer Oaks (1990), Golden Gate Bridge from Angel Island (1996), Monastery beach (1999), China camp (1998), Lake Chabot (1996), Eucalyptus Grove (1995)
- Movement: Tonalism

Jack Thomas Cassinetto (March 26, 1944 - January 4, 2018, Sonora, California) was a prolific California plein air artist of the tonalism movement who painted primarily Northern California landscapes such as Lake Tahoe, Yosemite, the Gold Country, the Northern California Coast, and the American River and Sacramento River.

== Personal life ==
Cassinetto was born on March 26, 1944, in Sonora, California, to Ben and Mary Sardella Cassinetto, both scions of pioneering families from Genoa, Italy. In 1966, he earned his BA in Art and English from California State University, Sacramento. He earned a Master of Fine Arts from the University of Northern Colorado in 1972.

As a young artist, he dabbled in sculpture, pottery, jewelry making and watercolor. He had painted all his adult life. His work was exclusively oil painting until 2008, and generally on boards. All work after 2008 is acrylic. His subjects were mostly Northern California landscapes from regions such as Lake Tahoe, Yosemite, the Northern California Coast, the American River, the Sacramento River, the Gold Country, and other locations in this area.

Aside from being an artist, he had multiple occupations throughout his life, including that of being a commodities broker, a partner in the family business, a teacher, a Sonora City Councilman and Mayor of Sonora (1986-1994). As Mayor, he had always been pro-development and pro-growth:

Maybe it's time for a change, to get someone from the other side. But I hope the people who plan on running will concentrate on more than one development here and one there and look at the big picture. Government is potholes, street lights and job descriptions. I hope they have an interest in the entire constituency.

He was first married to Betty Jean Carter. Their only child, Paul, was born in 1968. Jack spent the last 35 years of his life with his second wife, Connie Sue Clark, a photographer. He died in his sleep on January 4, 2018.

== Career ==
Too many artists get seduced by sunlight and have to continually adjust for light variations. The lighting conditions in [my studio] are perfect. It never changes from day to night. I always know the color on the canvas is what I want it to be. —Jack Cassinetto

Jack Cassinetto was a plein air painter of the tonalism movement, "one of the finest artists of his time and genre." He often used reclaimed arts and crafts framing or antique furniture in his work. His influences included Granville Redmond, Xavier Martinez, Gottardo Piazzoni and Arthur Frank Mathews.

His work has been displayed at galleries such as Christopher Queen Galleries, New Masters Gallery, Ventana Gallery, Chapman Gallery, Wendt Gallery, Lisa Coscino Gallery, California Art Gallery, Meyer Gallery, Endenhurst and Morseburg Galleries, Sagebrush Gallery, Claypoole - Freese Gallery, James Harold Galleries, Clars Auction Galleries, The Craftsman Galleries, Thomas Reynolds Gallery, The Marine Gallery, The Main Gallery, Gregory Kondos Art Gallery, and First Street Galleries.

Cassinetto's work has been featured in publications including American Art Review (2004), Plein Air Magazine (June 2004), Southwest Art (October 2002), American Bungalow, and The Artists' Bluebook (2005). His work has been displayed at the Pacific Grove Art Institute (1995), San Joaquin Delta College (2008), Pasadena Historical Museum (2000) and the Alburquerque Museum (2003, 2004, 2005).
