= City Hotel (Sonora, California) =

- U.S. National Register of Historic Places
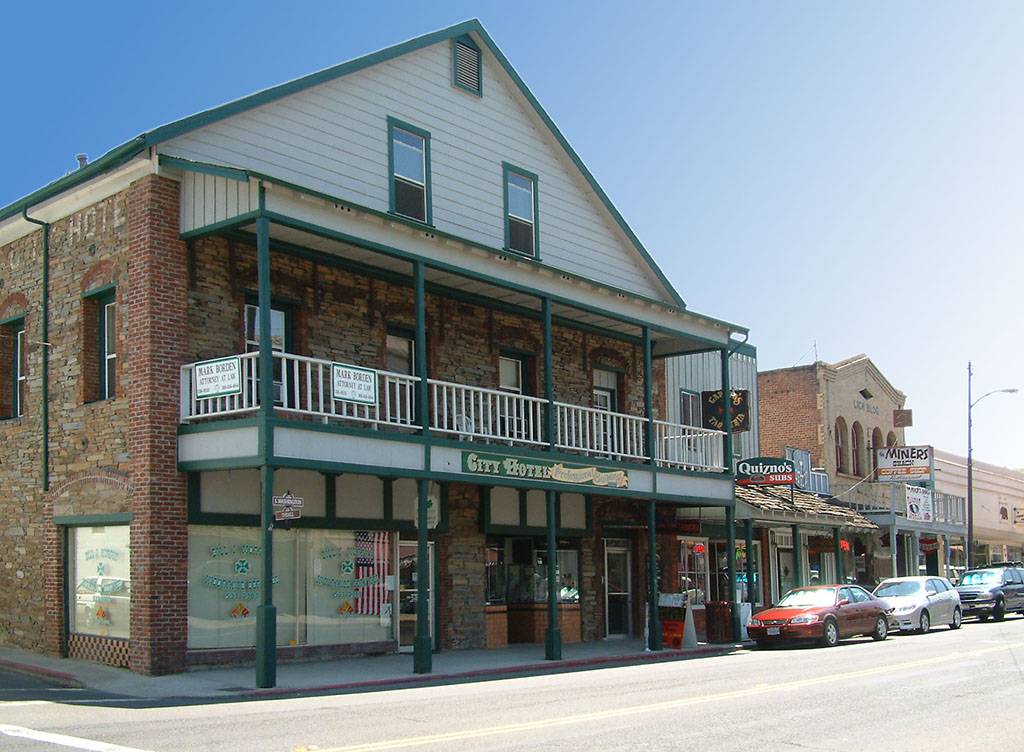
- Sonora, California's old hotel building

- Location within California Location within the United States
- Location: 145 S. Washington St., Sonora, California
- Coordinates: 37°59′1″N 120°22′51″W
- Area: 0.2 acres (0.081 ha)
- Built: 1852
- NRHP reference No.: 83001248
- Added to NRHP: June 30, 1983

The City Hotel in Sonora, California is a former hotel in downtown Sonora at 145 South Washington Street. The building, constructed circa 1852, is associated with Alonzo Green, Sonora's mayor in 1852 and 1853, and James Lane. It includes a sitting room, bar and restaurant with rooms upstairs. It is built of slate, adobe, and red brick, and is one of Sonora's oldest buildings, dating from the early days of the California Gold Rush.

When it opened for business, it was the chief hostelry in Sonora, the crossroads of the southern gold mining region and the commercial center of Tuolumne County. All of the stagecoach lines stopped here.

The hotel had a saloon, a billiard room, a dining room, twenty private rooms and several sample ones, where drummers (traveling salesmen) could show their wares to local merchants.

It belonged to Olivier Bemis in the 1860s. In the early 1900s, the hotel ran a daily horse-pulled-bus service to meet trains. It was listed on the National Register of Historic Places for Tuolumne County, California in 1983.
