= San Luis Obispo County Superior Court =

California superior court with jurisdiction over San Luis Obispo County

Superior Court of California, County of San Luis Obispo
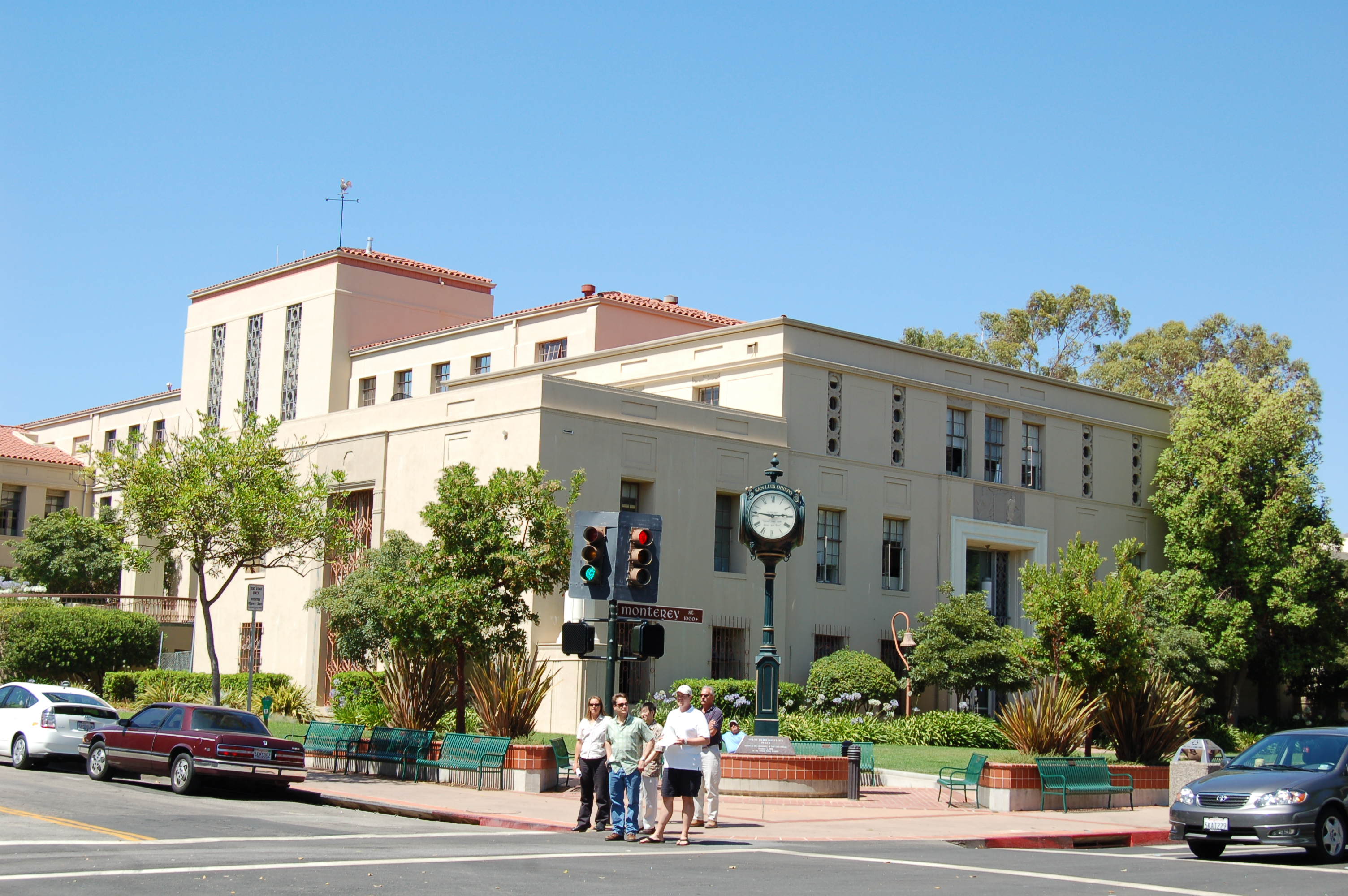
- Main county courthouse, 1050 Monterey St (San Luis Obispo)
- Interactive map of Superior Court of California, County of San Luis Obispo
- 35.28262°N 120.66100°W
- Established: 1850
- Jurisdiction: San Luis Obispo County, California
- Location: San Luis Obispo (county seat)
- Coordinates: 35.28262°N 120.66100°W
- Appeals to: California Court of Appeal for the Second District, Division Six
- Website: slo.courts.ca.gov

Presiding Judge
- Currently: Hon. Rita Federman

Assistant Presiding Judge
- Currently: Hon. Tana Coates

Court Executive Officer
- Currently: Michael Powell

The Superior Court of California, County of San Luis Obispo, informally known as the San Luis Obispo County Superior Court, is the California superior court with jurisdiction over San Luis Obispo County.

== History ==
San Luis Obispo County was one of the original counties formed when California assumed statehood in 1850.

In the election of April 14, 1850, J. Mariano Bonilla was elected County Judge and Joseph Warren and Jesus Luna were elected Justices of the Peace; collectively, the three were the members of the Court of Sessions. Warren resigned his position in November and Louis Raggio was appointed as his replacement. Early records, including court proceedings, were kept in Spanish. At the time, the Court of Sessions functioned as both the judicial and executive branches of the county government, controlling administrative and financial duties; the county Board of Supervisors system was implemented in 1852 to take over the executive role.

The city of San Luis Obispo was not planned and surveyed until William Hutton was granted a license to do so by the Court of Sessions in August 1850. The justices of the Court of Sessions were Jesus Luna, Mariano G. Lascano, and Luis Raggio in January 1851, when they were required to post a US$1,000 bond.

In addition to the Court of Sessions, the Second Judicial District consisted of the counties of San Luis Obispo and Santa Barbara. The first judge of the Second District was Henry A. Tefft, who was elected in 1850 and held the office until he drowned in the harbor of San Luis Obispo on February 6, 1852, after returning from a session of the court held in Santa Barbara. Joaquin Carrillo, then serving as the County Judge of Santa Barbara County, was appointed as his replacement. Judge Carrillo served until 1863, when San Luis Obispo County was incorporated into the First Judicial District and Pablo de la Guerra was elected and served until he resigned in 1873. Judge de la Guerra was succeeded by Judge Walter Murray, who served until his death in 1875, and was succeeded in turn by Judge Eugene Fawcett, who served until the new constitution rearranged the judicial system in 1879.

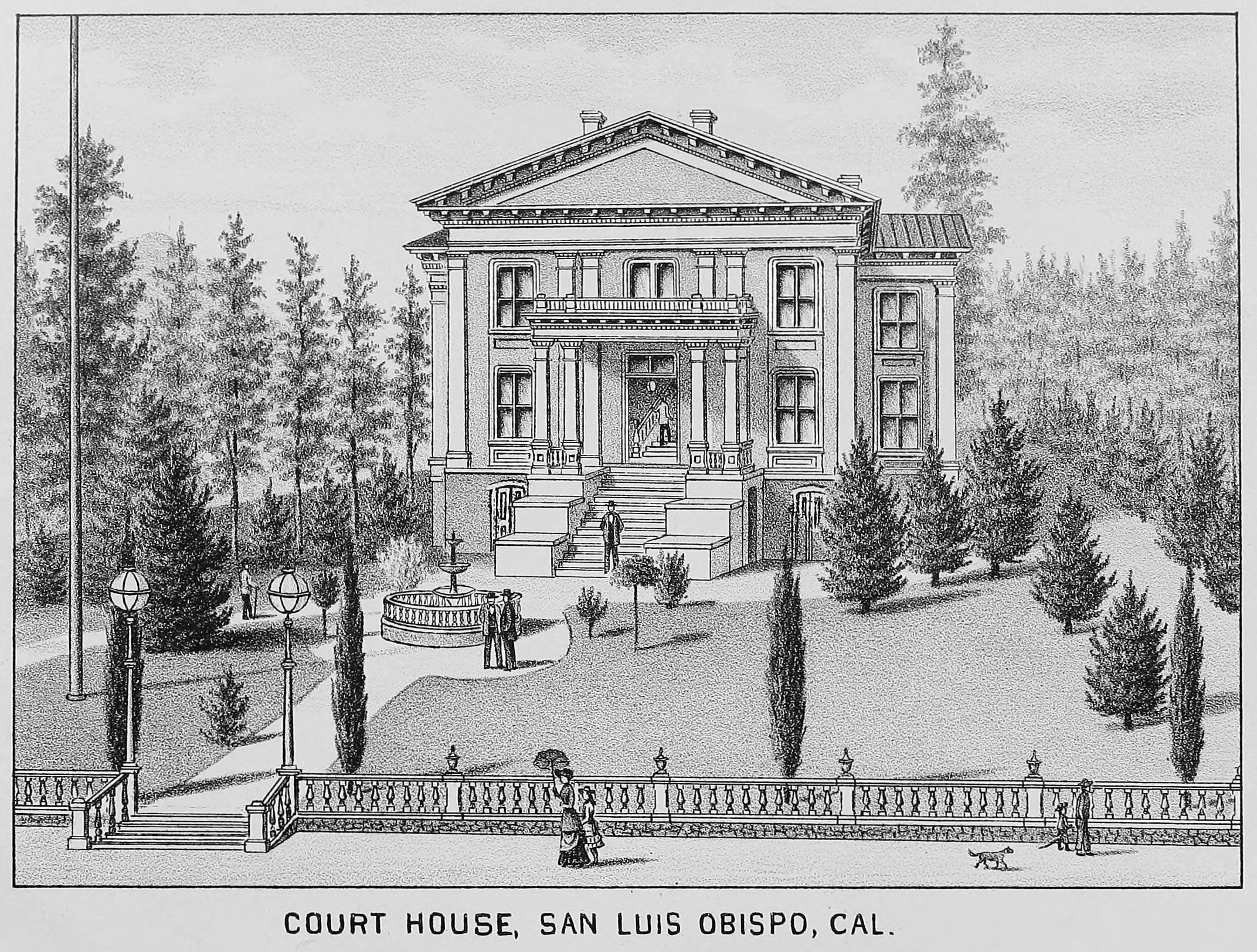
1872 courthouse (illustration from 1883)

The first county courthouse was authorized by issuing US$42,000 (equivalent to $1,100,000 in 2024) of bonds in October 1872. It replaced a building which the District Attorney called "a marvel of repulsiveness, and the courtroom with its wretched appointment a disgrace to the county".

With the adoption of a new state constitution in 1879, the Superior Court system was established and Louis McMurtry was elected the first Superior Court judge. After Judge McMurtry died in February 1883, D.S. Gregory was appointed by Governor George Stoneman, Jr.

In 1940, a replacement courthouse was constructed in front of the old courthouse, and the 1873 courthouse was demolished. The 1940 courthouse was designed by A.R. Walker and P.A. Eisen as a Works Progress Administration project. It was refurbished in 1996 and a modern annex was added.

== Venues ==
San Luis Obispo County Superior Court locations:
1 1050 Monterey St (San Luis Obispo)
2 214 S 16th St (Grover Beach)
3 1065 Kansas Ave (SLO, Juvenile)
4 901 Park St (Paso Robles)
5 801 Grand Ave (SLO, Veterans), temporarily closed

In addition to the main county courthouse in San Luis Obispo, court operations are conducted at a southern branch in Grover Beach and a northern branch in Paso Robles. Juvenile justice is handled at a separate facility in San Luis Obispo.

The Grover Beach branch was closed indefinitely starting in January 2012 due to budget cuts. Both the Grover Beach and Paso Robles branches were closed in the wake of the COVID-19 pandemic in California, starting in March 2020.
