= San Benito County Superior Court =

California superior court with jurisdiction over San Benito County

Superior Court of California, County of San Benito
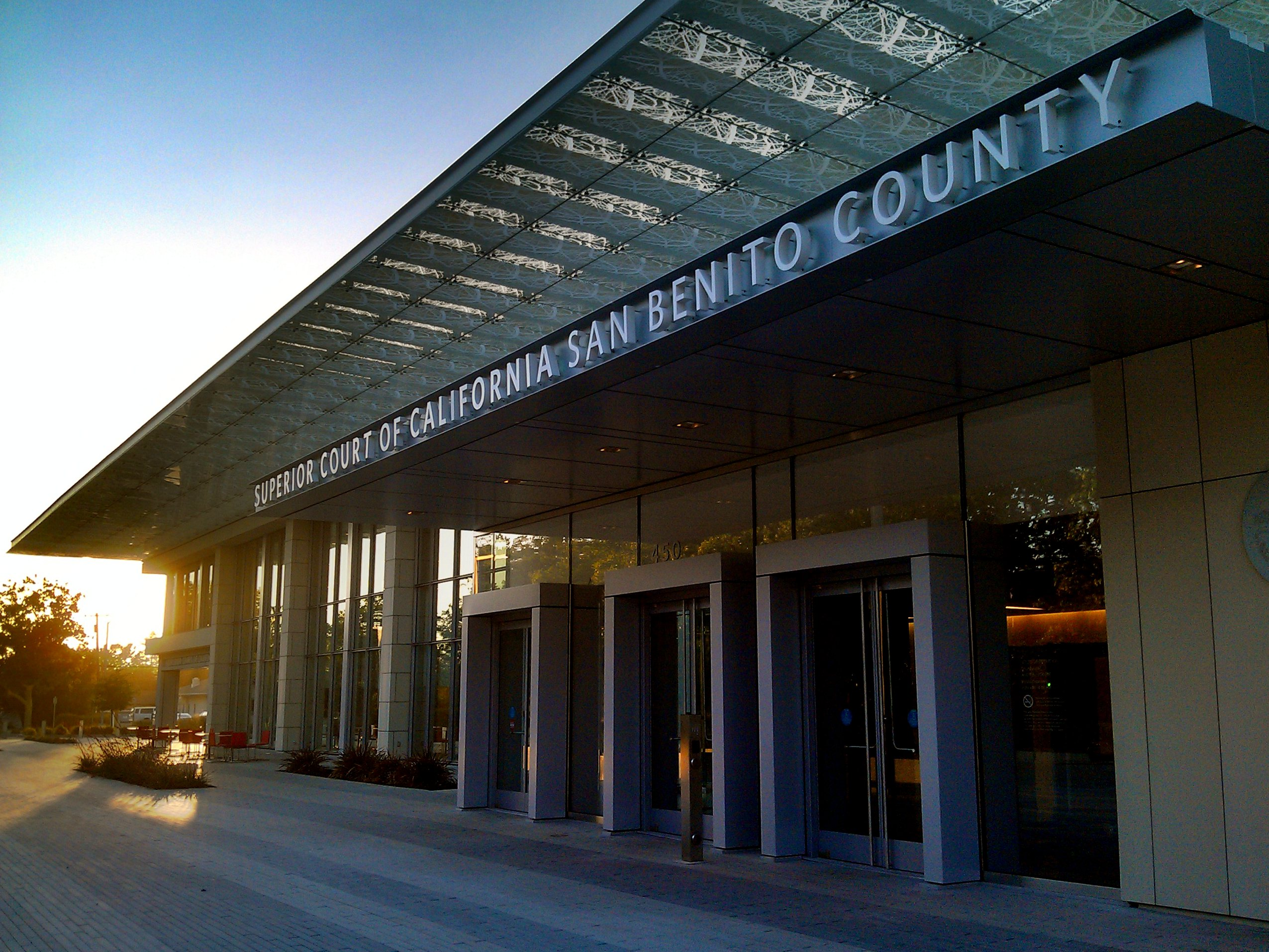
- 2014 courthouse
- Interactive map of Superior Court of California, County of San Benito
- 36.85306°N 121.40456°W
- Established: 1874
- Jurisdiction: San Benito County, California
- Location: Hollister (county seat)
- Coordinates: 36.85306°N 121.40456°W
- Appeals to: California Court of Appeal for the Sixth District
- Website: sanbenito.courts.ca.gov

Presiding Judge
- Currently: Hon. J. Omar Rodriguez

Court Executive Officer
- Currently: Tim Newman
- Since: Jan 8, 2024

The Superior Court of California, County of San Benito, also known as the San Benito County Superior Court, is the California superior court with jurisdiction over San Benito County.

== History ==
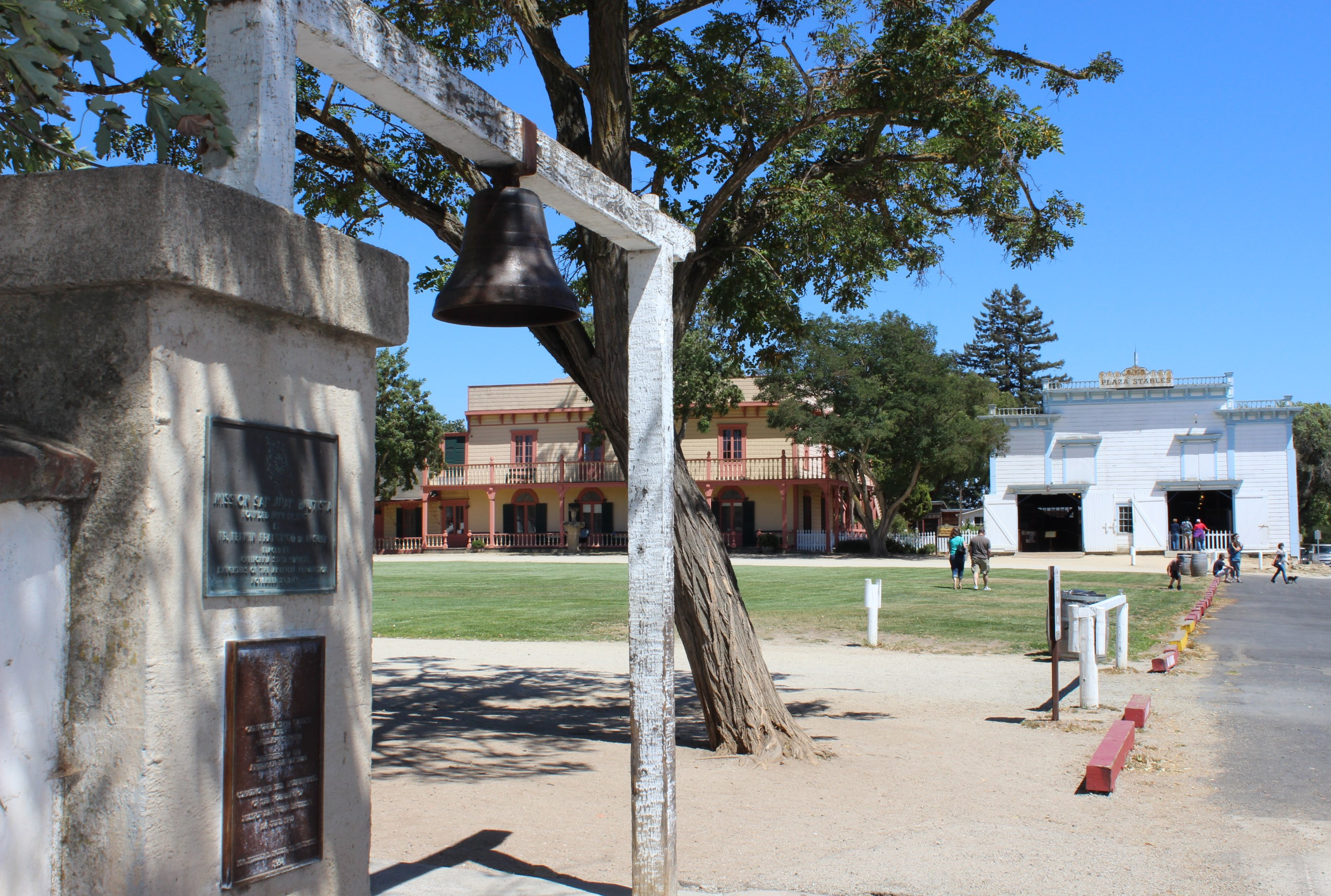
Plaza Hall in San Juan Bautista State Historic Park (left)

San Benito County was partitioned from Monterey County in 1874.

Angelo Zanetta purchased and rebuilt Plaza Hall in San Juan Bautista in 1868; it had been constructed originally in 1815 and Zanetta was anticipating that he could resell the building to the newly-formed San Benito County to serve as a courthouse. When Hollister was named the county seat instead, Zanetta made it his family home.

The first county courthouse was a two-story wooden building leased from F.I. Hodges that originally stood at the intersection of Monterey and Fourth in Hollister. Court operations began from April 6, 1874. This building was used until the new courthouse was completed in May 1888, whereupon it was moved to San Benito Street and used as a Japanese lodging house. John Breen was appointed as the first County Judge.

Former courthouses

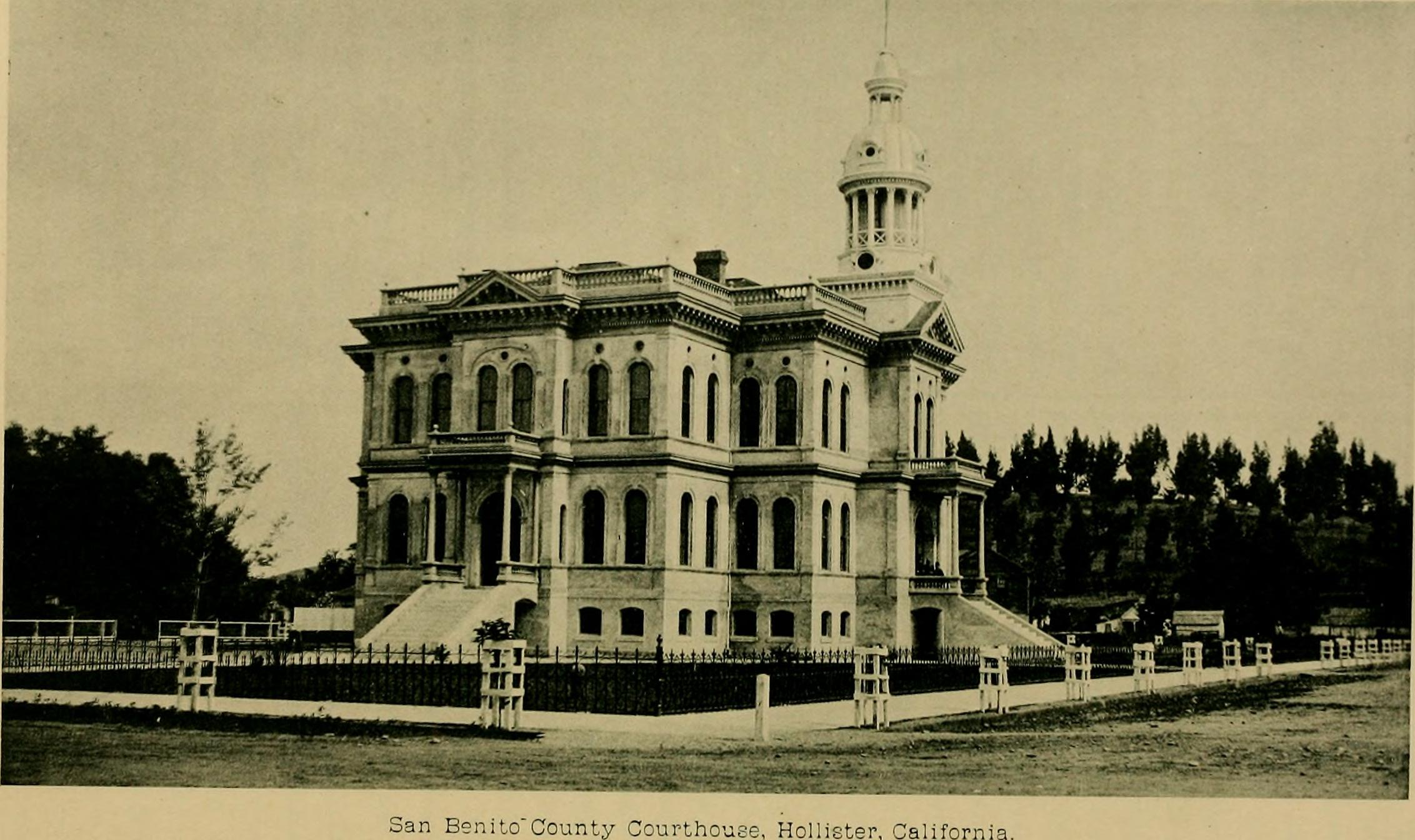
1888 courthouse

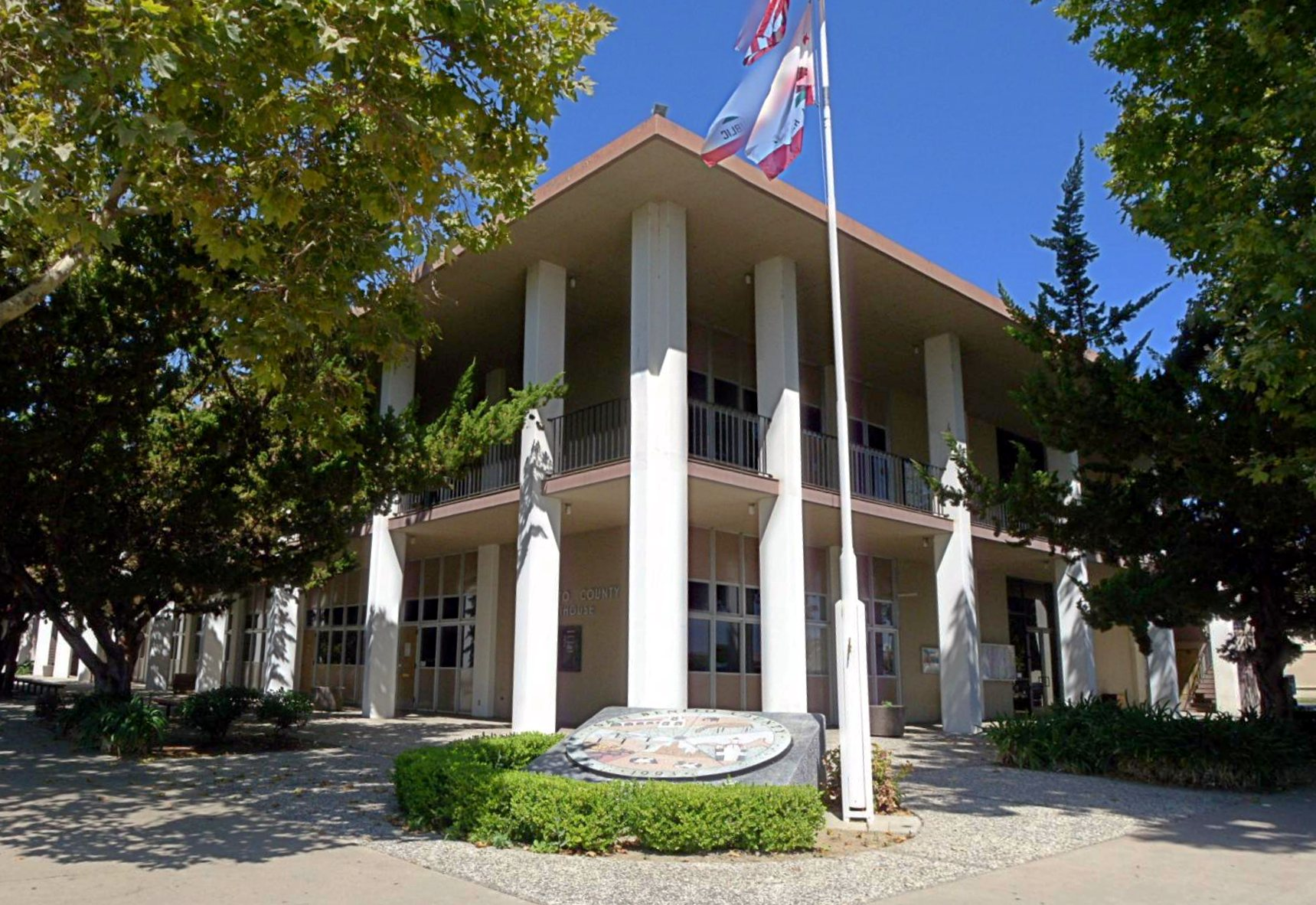
1963 courthouse

The murder trial against John T. Prewett drew many visitors to the courthouse, convincing the county Board of Supervisors "that a new court house is an absolute and pressing necessity", but an election on April 12, 1887, was defeated as the bonds proposed to be issued, US$30,000 (equivalent to $1,050,000 in 2024), was thought to be too low. A second election on June 7, 1887, authorizing the issue of US$40,000 (equivalent to $1,400,000 in 2024) in bonds passed; four lots were purchased. The cost of the land was US$4,500 (equivalent to $157,000 in 2024) and the successful bidder for construction was Knowles & Whitmore, at US$35,987 (equivalent to $1,260,000 in 2024), working from plans drawn up by J. Gosh. The new courthouse was completed on May 7, 1888.

This third courthouse in Hollister served until 1961, when it was damaged in an earthquake. A new courthouse was built in 1963. By 2006, the 1963 building was noted to have "extremely poor security, is functionally deficient, and is among the worst in the state in terms of physical condition", described as "outdated and undersized". The present courthouse was completed in 2014 and occupied in March of that year.

== Venues ==
San Benito County Superior Court locations:
1 440 5th St (1888–1961; 1963–2014)
2 450 4th St (2014)

The courthouse is in Hollister, the county seat. A new courthouse was completed in early 2014, consolidating operations from several different buildings in downtown Hollister.
