= Santa Cruz County Superior Court =

California superior court with jurisdiction over Santa Cruz County

Superior Court of California, County of Santa Cruz
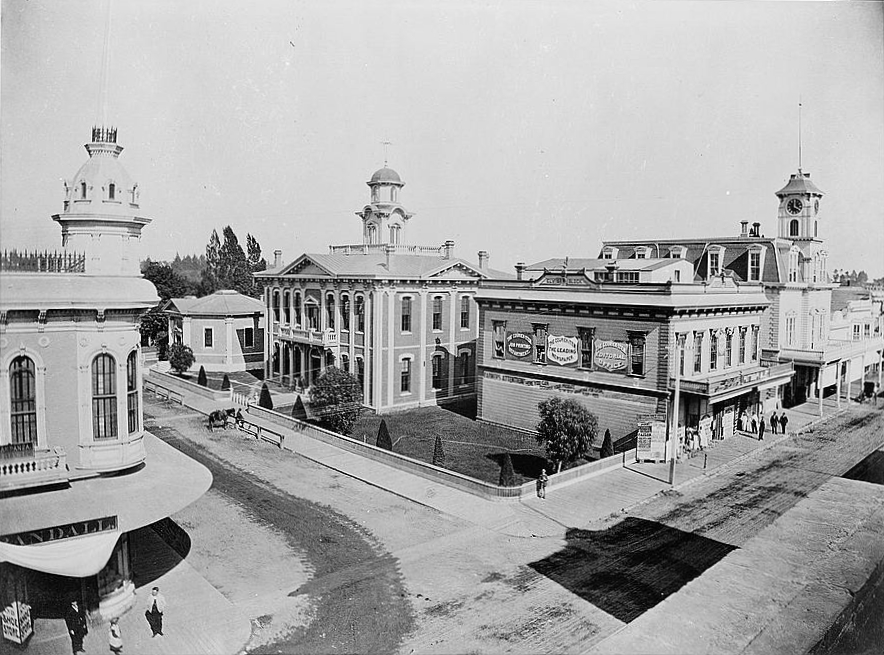
- County Court House in Santa Cruz (completed in 1896, demolished in 1989)
- Established: 1850
- Jurisdiction: Santa Cruz County, California
- Location: Santa Cruz; Watsonville
- Appeals to: California Court of Appeal for the Sixth District
- Website: www.santacruz.courts.ca.gov

Presiding Judge
- Currently: Hon. Syda Cogliati

Assistant Presiding Judge
- Currently: Hon. Jerry Bustos Vinluan

Court Executive Officer
- Currently: Sasha Morgan

The Superior Court of California, County of Santa Cruz, is the California superior court with jurisdiction over Santa Cruz County. It occupies two courthouses, one in Santa Cruz on Ocean Street and one in Watsonville on Second Street.

== History ==
Santa Cruz County was one of the original counties formed when California was made a state in 1850.

Court was first held in the Eagle Hotel, the largest building of the Mission Santa Cruz campus, just south of School Street. The second courthouse was a building on the east side of present-day Emmett Street nearby. The land and building were donated by Thomas Fallon to the county in 1852; Fallon originally had constructed it a residence.

Judge John H. Watson served as the first judge of the court of sessions (1850–51); after his resignation, he was succeeded by C.P. Hester (1851–59), Samuel Bell McKee, and David Belden. After the new California constitution of 1879 established the superior court system, J.H. Logan was the first judge, succeeded by F.J. McCann, Logan again (after McCann died in office), and then Lucas F. Smith.

Later, the third site for the court was held in the "flatiron edifice" (built by Hugo Hihn in 1860, between present-day Front and Pacific) until a new courthouse, designed by Thomas Beck, was constructed by Sedgewick J. Lynch and George T. Gragg in 1866 for $20,000 and completed in 1867 at Cooper and Pacific. It was built on land deeded to the county in April 1866; the selection of the "flats" of Santa Cruz rather than the hill on which the mission stood was a matter of some controversy, as a group had already proposed to donate Mission Hill land, which the county accepted, then rescinded once the Cooper Street offer was extended. The 1867 courthouse was destroyed by fire over the night of April 14–15, 1894, prompting the construction of a new courthouse, completed and turned over to the county by December 1896; it was designed by N.A. Comstock and built by R.H. McCabe. The 1896 courthouse was damaged in the 1906 San Francisco earthquake, with the courthouse tower coming down.

As the building aged, multiple replacements for the 1896 courthouse were proposed starting in 1927, and an annex was built to alleviate overcrowding in 1937, then remodeled in 1949. The court moved to its present offices in 1967, and the 1896 courthouse was remodeled with offices and retail space as Cooper House in 1972. It was listed on the National Register of Historic Places as part of the Pacific Avenue Historic District (NRIS #87000004) in 1987, damaged by the 1989 Loma Prieta earthquake and demolished; the district was delisted in 1991.

== Venues ==
Santa Cruz County Superior Court locations:
1 701 Ocean St (Santa Cruz)
2 1 2nd St (Watsonville)

The Superior Court of Santa Cruz has three locations:

1. Santa Cruz Courthouse located at 701 Ocean Street, Santa Cruz

2. Watsonville Courthouse located at 1 Second Street, Watsonville

3. Felton Courthouse located at 3650 Graham Hill Road, Felton
