= San Joaquin County Superior Court =

California superior court with jurisdiction over San Joaquin County

Superior Court of California, County of San Joaquin
- Interactive map of Superior Court of California, County of San Joaquin
- 37.95336°N 121.28876°W
- Established: 1850
- Jurisdiction: San Joaquin County, California
- Location: Stockton (county seat); Lodi; Manteca; Tracy (closed 2011)
- Coordinates: 37.95336°N 121.28876°W
- Appeals to: California Court of Appeal for the Third District
- Website: sjcourts.org

Presiding Judge
- Currently: Hon. Gus C. Barrera, II
- Since: Jan 1, 2024
- Lead position ends: Dec 31, 2025

Assistant Presiding Judge
- Currently: Hon. Lance Jacot
- Since: Jan 1, 2024
- Lead position ends: Dec 31, 2025

Court Executive Officer
- Currently: Stephanie Bohrer
- Since: May 2023

The Superior Court of California, County of San Joaquin, informally known as the San Joaquin County Superior Court, is the California superior court with jurisdiction over San Joaquin County, California, United States.

== History ==
San Joaquin County was one of the original counties formed when California assumed statehood in 1850. Stockton was named the county seat. George G. Belt assumed his duties as "judge of the first instance" in October 1849, succeeded by Benjamin Williams under the election of March 1850. The Court of Sessions held its first meeting on June 3, 1850, Judge Williams presiding with associate justices Harrison Amyx and O.C. Emory.

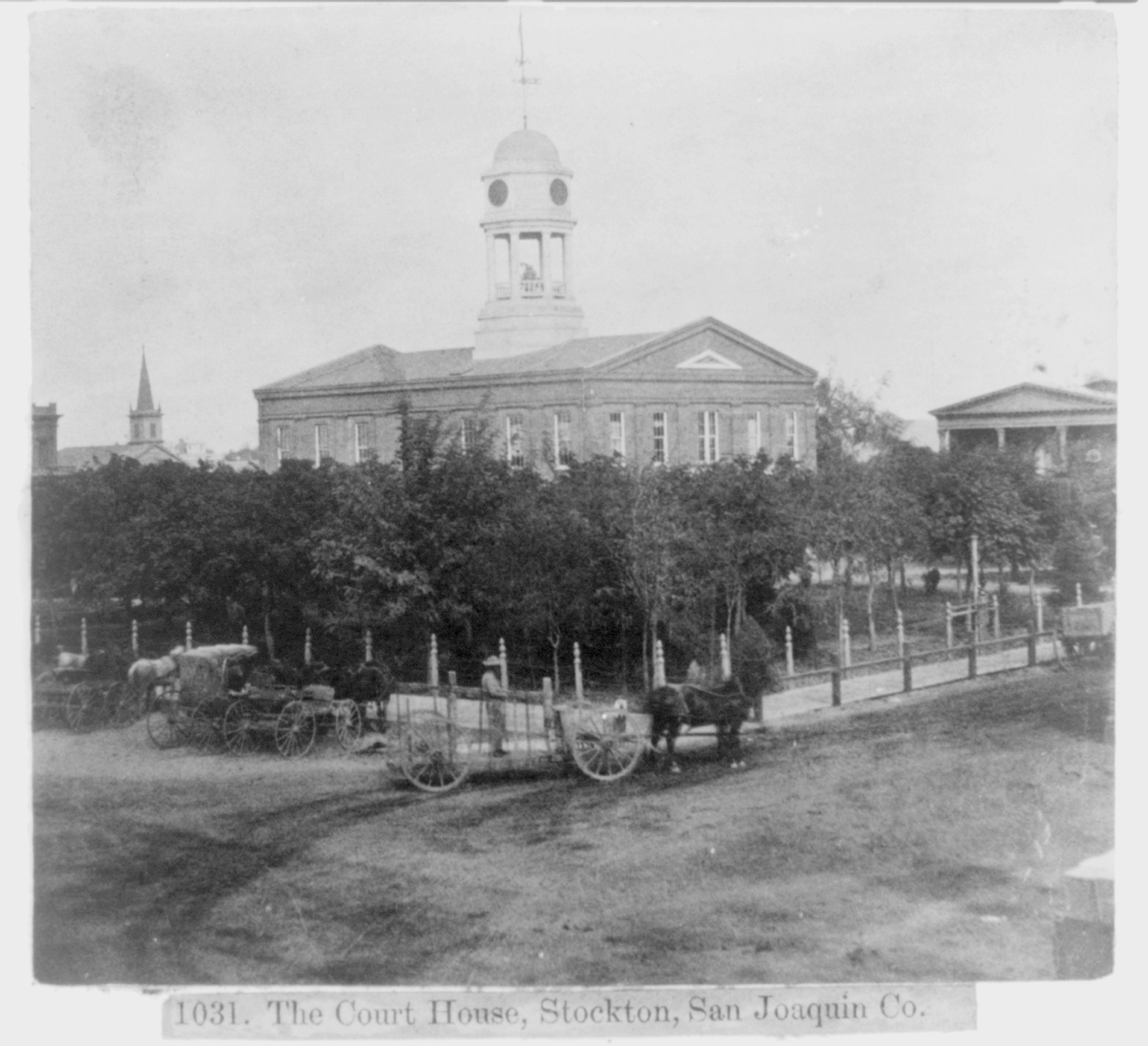
1854 courthouse (1866)

The land for what is now Courthouse Square was deeded to the City of Stockton by C.M. Weber in 1851, and the cost of a new courthouse was to be shared equally between city and county. A tax of 1/4% was enacted to raise funds for the court house and city hall, which was designed by Ayres and Higgins in 1853. The cornerstone was laid on August 6, 1853, and the first courthouse was dedicated on April 17, 1854. Theodore Winters built it for a bid of US$83,920 (equivalent to $2,940,000 in 2024). This first courthouse was approximately 60 ft × 80 ft (18 m × 24 m) and 50 ft (15 m) high. After the Court of Sessions was abolished in 1862, the role of County Judge was held by several others.

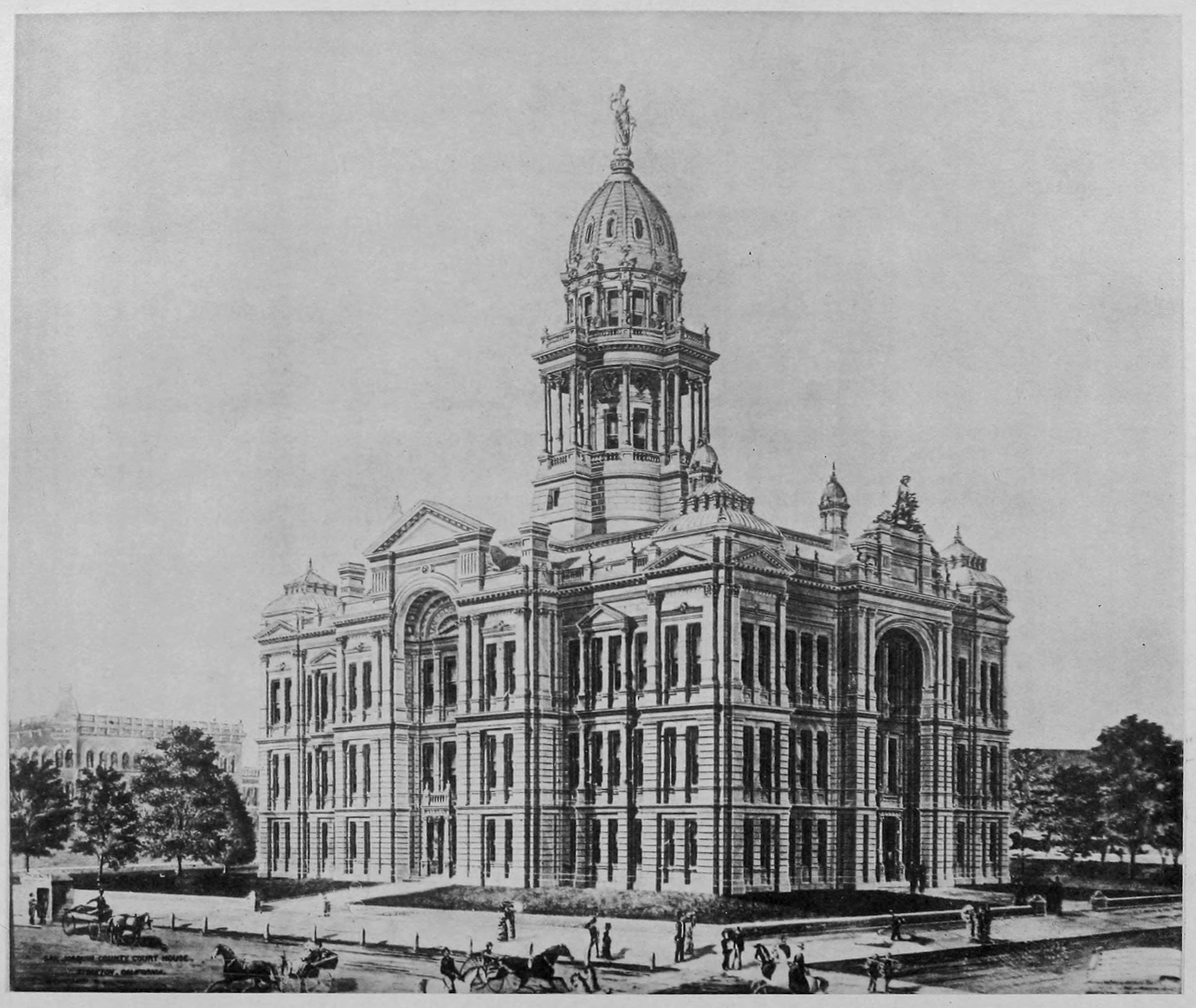
1890 courthouse, demolished in 1961

A second courthouse was started on April 14, 1887, after bonds were issued for US$250,000 (equivalent to $8,750,000 in 2024). The second courthouse had a footprint of 56 ft × 126 ft (17 m × 38 m) and was topped by a dome 172 ft (52 m) high. It was designed by E.E. Myers and completed in 1890. By 1961, cracks had appeared in the structure and it was razed to make room for a third courthouse. Stockton had embarked on an ambitious plan of urban renewal, starting by "bulldoz[ing] West End blight and replac[ing] it with modern offices and residences". A time capsule that had been buried there in 1897 was opened on July 8, 1961, but the papers contained had been destroyed by humidity and the coins were of low value. Stockton architect Glen Mortensen lamented the loss of the 1890 courthouse in 2011: "It was beautiful. Whenever you destroy good architecture it's a bad thing. It destroys the ties between the new and the old." Some elements of the building were saved and moved, including the doors for the county board of supervisors public meeting room.

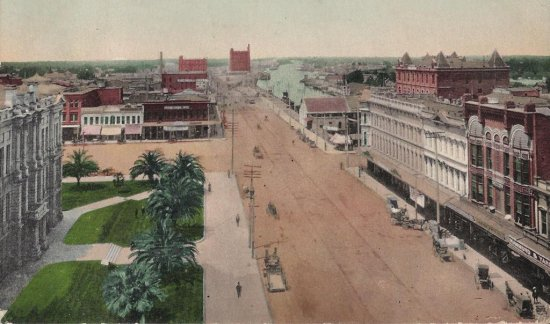
Aerial view directed west along Weber St, c. 1909; the 1890 courthouse is visible on the left and Hunter Square is the wide street just west of it.

The third courthouse was completed in 1964. It consists of two connected buildings; the southern wing is also known as the Court Wing, while the northern wing is the Administration Wing. The vacant square opposite the courthouse, named Hunter Square, was landscaped at this time with parking, a fountain, and a water feature. The third courthouse was designed by the local Stockton firm of Mortenson & Hollstein and the landscape architect was Donald Crump. The Goddess of Justice statue which stood atop the dome of the 1890 courthouse was preserved, restored in 1964, and placed next to the new courthouse.

The current courthouse was completed in Summer of 2017 and occupied in August of that year. It has 310,443 ft^{2} (28,841.1 m^{2}) of floor space and 30 courtrooms and was designed by NBBJ. It was built on what was Hunter Square, an open space created by widening Hunter Street between Weber and Main streets. The fountain at Hunter Square was moved to a roundabout at Miner Avenue and San Joaquin Street.

== Venues ==
San Joaquin County Superior Court locations:
1 180 E Weber St (Stockton)
2 535 W Mathews Rd (French Camp, Juvenile)
3 217 W Elm St (Lodi)
4 315 E Center St (Manteca)
5 475 10th St (Tracy), closed

Main court operations are held in Stockton, the county seat, at the modern 2017 court house. There are additional branch locations in Lodi and Manteca. The branch at Tracy closed in 2011.
