= Shasta County Superior Court =

California superior court with jurisdiction over Shasta Country

Superior Court of California, County of Shasta
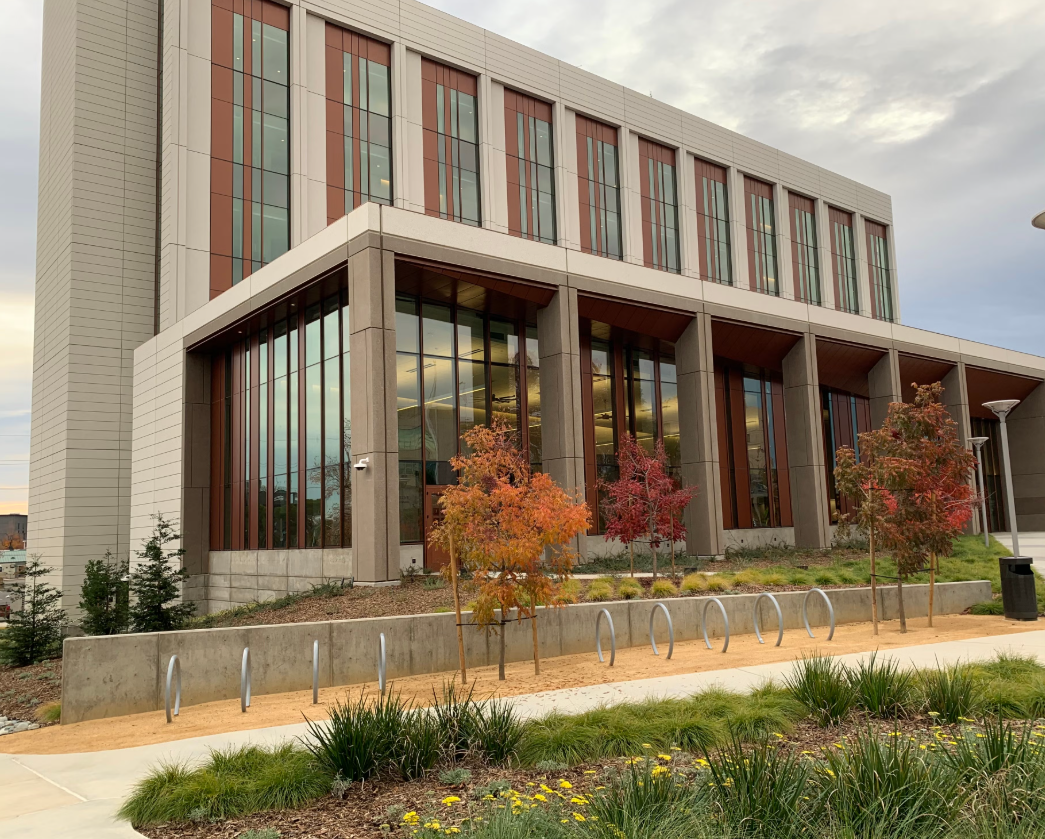
- New Shasta County Courthouse
- Interactive map of Superior Court of California, County of Shasta
- 40.5827°N 122.3951°W
- Established: 1850
- Jurisdiction: Shasta County, California
- Location: Redding
- Coordinates: 40.5827°N 122.3951°W
- Appeals to: California Court of Appeal for the Third District
- Website: shasta.courts.ca.gov

Presiding Judge
- Currently: Hon. Tamara L. Wood

Assistant Presiding Judge
- Currently: Hon. Summer D. Ryan

Court Executive Officer
- Currently: Cody Stenderup

The Superior Court of California, County of Shasta, informally known as the Shasta County Superior Court, is the California superior court with jurisdiction over Shasta County.

== History ==
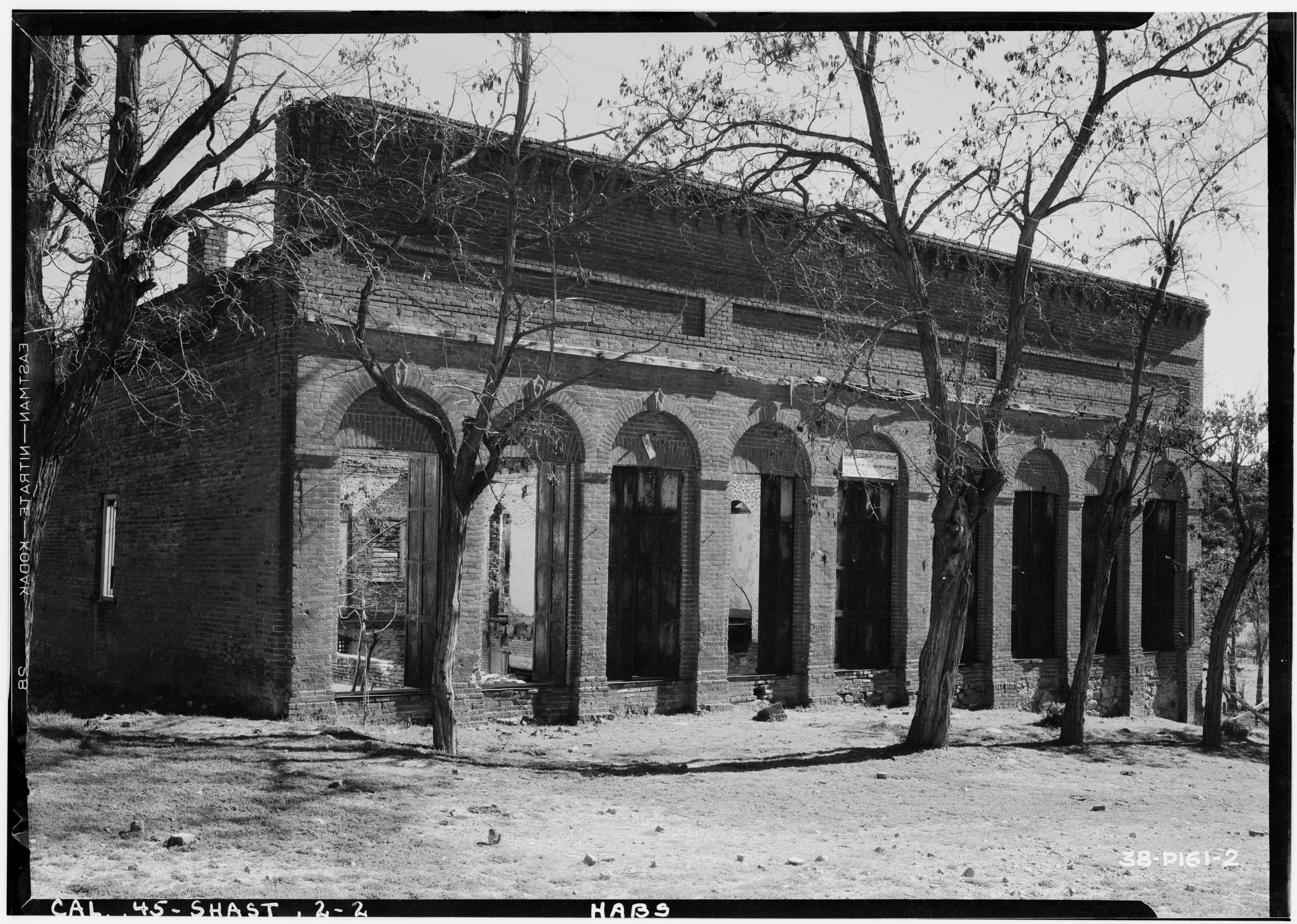
Old (1862) Shasta Courthouse in ruins, 1934

Shasta County was one of the original counties of California, created in 1850 at the time of statehood. The eponymous city of Shasta was the second county seat, and the county courthouse was housed in a former saloon, restaurant, and billiard-room originally built in 1855, then purchased and remodeled for the court in 1861; it is now part of Shasta State Historic Park, which is California Historical Landmark No. 77 and was added to the National Register of Historic Places in 1971.

After the county seat was moved from Shasta to Redding in 1888, bids for the first purpose-built county courthouse in Redding were advertised in June 1888 and completed in May 1889 at the corner of 3rd and G streets; it survived a fire in 1924. The design was credited to architect A.A. Cook.

A replacement courthouse was built in 1956. With the construction of the new courthouse, Redding's first courthouse was converted into county office space and used as such until being demolished in 1963, making space for a three-storey annex (completed 1967) to the 1956 courthouse.

=== New Courthouse ===
Shasta County Superior Court locations:
1 15312 CA-299 (Shasta, 1862–88)
2 1500 Court St (Redding, 1889–1956)
3 20509 Shasta St (Burney Branch)
4 1500 Court St (Redding, 1956–2023)
5 1655 West St (Redding Justice Center)
6 1515 Court St (Redding, 2023- )

The new Shasta County Courthouse was approved on December 15, 2010. The new 166,887 square foot courthouse will have 14 courtrooms, just two more than the current courthouse. The new $170 million courthouse is expected to be opened in August 2023.
