= Kern County Superior Court =

California superior court with jurisdiction over Kern County

Superior Court of California, County of Kern
- Established: 1866
- Jurisdiction: Kern County, California
- Location: Bakersfield (county seat); Delano; Lake Isabella; Lamont; Mojave; Ridgecrest; Shafter; Taft
- Appeals to: California Court of Appeal for the Fifth District
- Website: kern.courts.ca.gov

Presiding Judge
- Currently: Hon. Eric Bradshaw

Assistant Presiding Judge
- Currently: Hon. Colette Humphrey

Court Executive Officer
- Currently: Tamarah Harber-Pickens

The Superior Court of California, County of Kern, informally the Kern County Superior Court, is the California superior court with jurisdiction over Kern County.

== History ==
Kern County was partitioned from Tulare, Los Angeles, and San Bernardino counties in 1866, following a failed effort to establish Buena Vista County which started in 1855.

The initial county seat was set in Havilah, and the governor appointed Theron Reed as the county judge. At their first two meetings, held August 1–2, 1866, the county board of supervisors purchased a site for the courthouse for $800 and let a contract to T.H. Binnex, who built a wooden structure for $2200. The Havilah courthouse served the county until 1874, when the county seat was moved to Bakersfield; at that point, the original courthouse was dismantled and the lumber was sold to P.T. Colby, who reassembled it on Chester Avenue in Bakersfield as a house.

Although Bakersfield failed to win the county seat in the election of February 15, 1873, it prevailed in another election held on January 26, 1874. Following state authorization of a bond for $25,000 to build a new courthouse and jail, George B. Chester donated the block of land southwest of the intersection of Truxtun and Chester on September 1, 1874, and A.W. Burrell was awarded the construction contract for $29,999 on October 5. The new courthouse was accepted by the supervisors on April 3, 1876. The architect for the 1876 courthouse was Albert A. Bennett. An addition to the courthouse was authorized on May 13, 1889 and completed on June 11, 1896. The architects for the 1896 addition were Charles & Barnett McDougall.

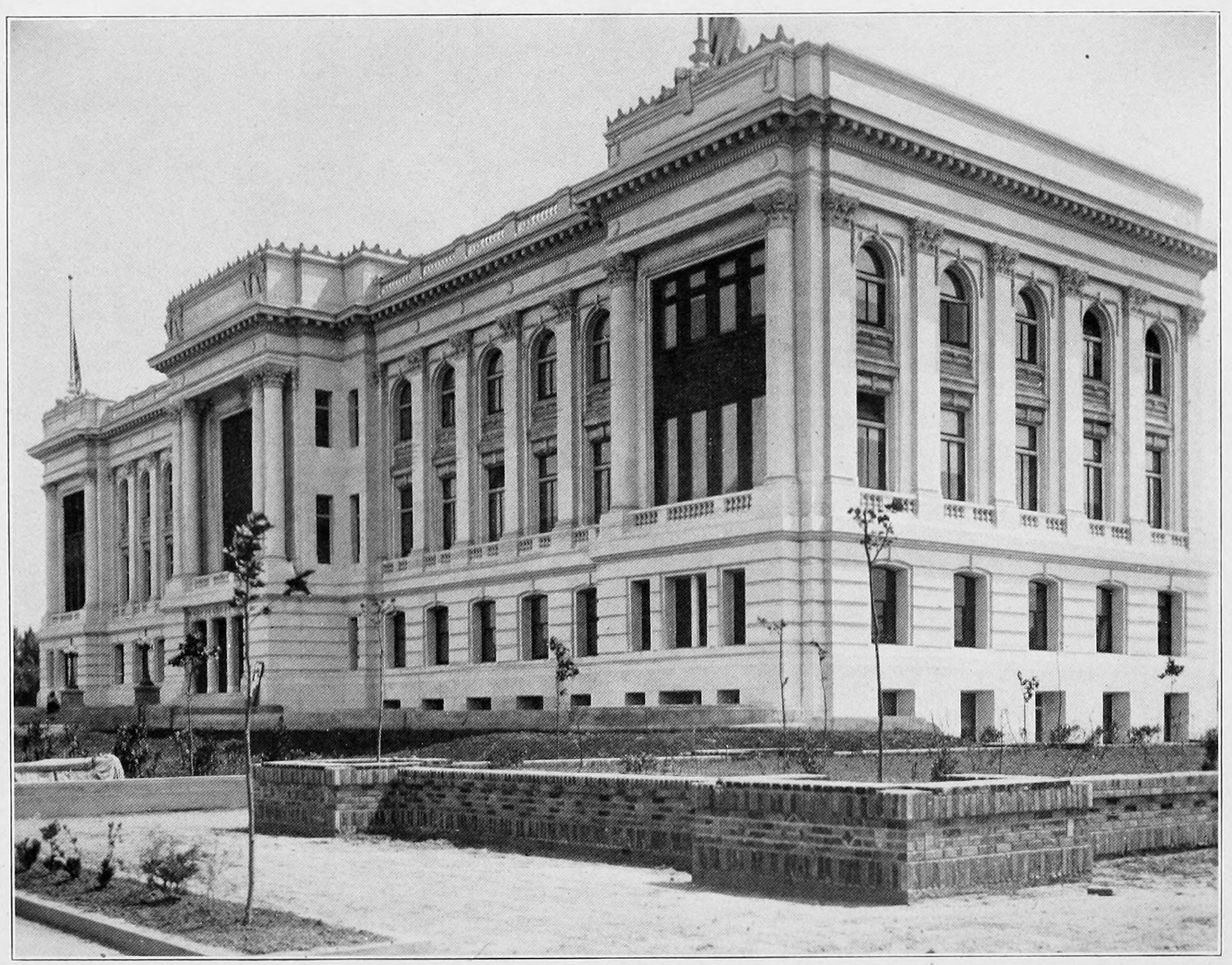
Kern County Courthouse, Bakersfield, California (completed 1912)

A new court house was approved by voters on September 14, 1909, and construction began in July 1910; the construction contract was awarded to Frederick J. Amweg for $340,827. The new courthouse, completed in 1912, was built east across Chester from the 1896 courthouse, between Truxtun and Fifteenth; the 1896 courthouse was sold to the city of Bakersfield on July 9, 1913, to serve as its city hall. The 1912 courthouse was designed by Frederick Meyers. Both the 1896 and 1912 courthouses were damaged by the 1952 Kern County earthquake and eventually torn down.

The Kern County courthouse (1415 Truxtun) that replaced the 1912 building was completed in 1959 to a design by Ernest L McCoy; although it is still standing and a few cases are still tried there, the County Justice Building, completed in 1980 one block east at 1215 Truxtun, has largely replaced the 1959 courthouse.

== Venues ==
Kern County Superior Court locations:
1 2100 College Ave (Juvenile, Bakersfield)
2 1215 & 1415 Truxtun Ave (Metro, Bakersfield)
1661 L St (Jury Services, Bakersfield)
3 3131 Arrow St (Traffic, Bakersfield)
4 5555 California Ave, Ste 100 (Revenue, Bakersfield)
5 1122 Jefferson St (Delano)
6 7046 Lake Isabella Blvd (Kern River / Lake Isabella)
7 12022 Main St (Lamont)
8 1773 State Hwy 58 Bus (Mojave)
9 132 E Coso Ave (Ridgecrest)
10 325 Central Valley Hwy (Shafter)
11 311 Lincoln St (Taft)

Bakersfield, the county seat, includes the main court buildings; there are seven satellite locations around the county.
