= Plumas County Superior Court =

California superior court with jurisdiction over Plumas County

Superior Court of California, County of Plumas
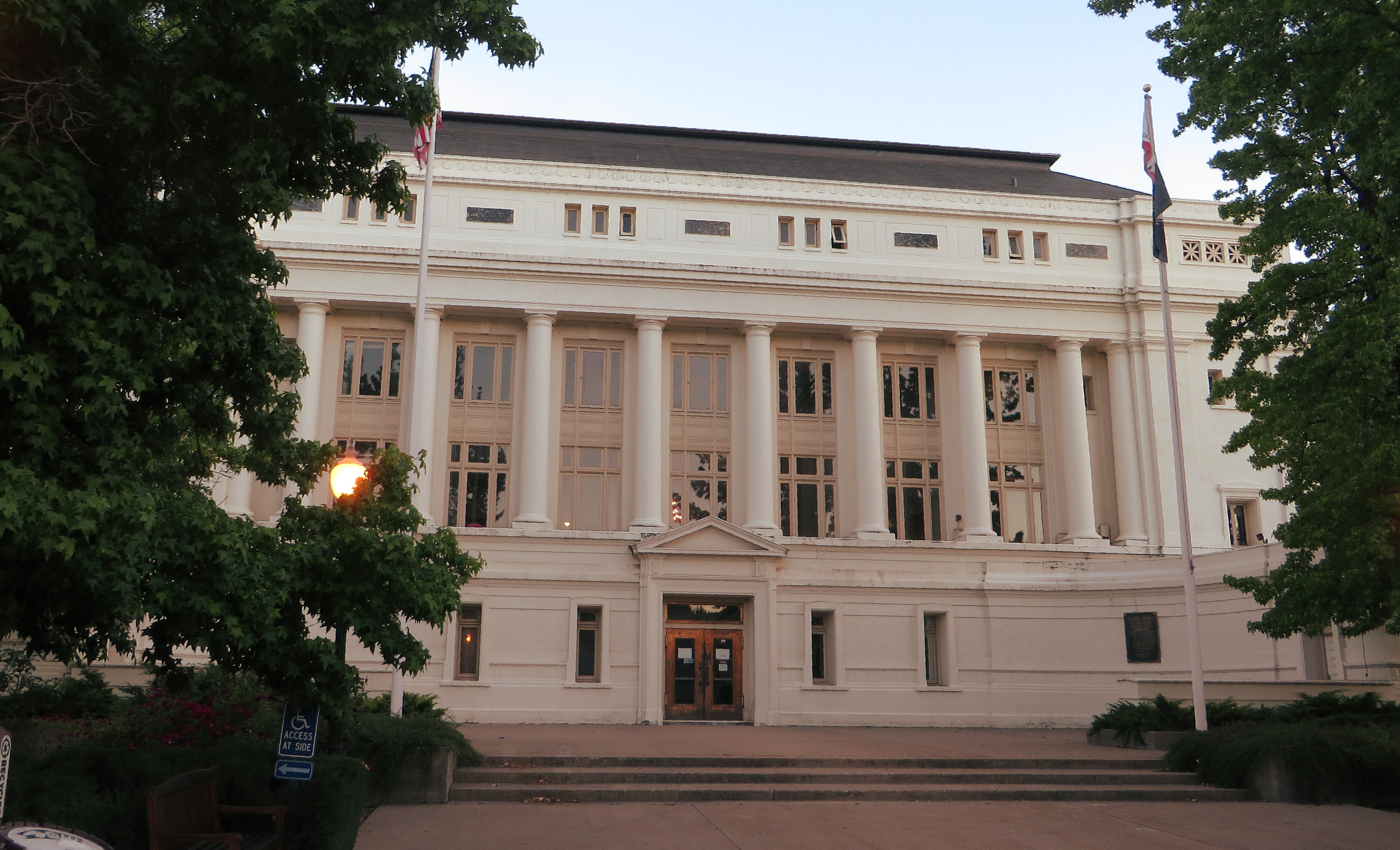
- Plumas County Courthouse
- Interactive map of Superior Court of California, County of Plumas
- 39.93630°N 120.94815°W
- Established: 1864
- Jurisdiction: Plumas County, California
- Location: Quincy (county seat)
- Coordinates: 39.93630°N 120.94815°W
- Appeals to: California Court of Appeal for the Third District
- Website: plumas.courts.ca.gov

Presiding Judge
- Currently: Hon. Douglas Prouty

Assistant Presiding Judge
- Currently: Hon. William Abramson

Court Executive Officer
- Currently: Sue Selegean-Dostal

The Superior Court of California, County of Plumas, also known as the Plumas County Superior Court, is the California superior court with jurisdiction over Plumas County.

== History ==
Plumas County was partitioned from Butte County in 1854. William T. Ward was elected as the first County Judge that April. Judge Ward was succeeded by E.T. Hogan in 1857, then Israel Jones was elected in 1863 but died before assuming office, so A.P. Moore was appointed by the governor and served until 1865, when Hogan was re-elected. He was succeeded by A.P. Moore in 1869, who served until 1873, when Hogan was re-elected again. In 1877, the final county judge was William A. Cheney.

The act that organized Plumas County also made it part of the Ninth Judicial District, which included Shasta, Butte, Colusa, and Plumas counties. At the time, the district judge was Joseph W. McCorkle. Judge McCorkle was succeeded by William R. Daingerfield in 1854, but Plumas was moved to the Fourteenth District with Sierra and Nevada counties, falling under Judge Niles Searles. Judge Searles was succeeded by C.E. Williams in 1857, when Plumas was moved again to the Fifteenth District with Butte, Colusa, and Tehama counties. Warren T. Sexton succeeded Williams that fall, and in January 1859, Plumas and Sierra counties were moved to the Seventeenth Judicial District; Governor Weller appointed Peter Van Clief the new district judge until the election that fall, when Robert H. Taylor was elected to that role. Judge Taylor was succeeded by L.E. Pratt in 1862, and Plumas was moved again with Butte, Tehama, and Lassen counties to the second judicial district in April 1864, falling under District Judge Sexton. Judge Sexton was succeeded by Charles F. Lott in January 1870, who served until the Twenty-First District was created in February 1876, encompassing Plumas, Lassen, and Modoc counties. Governor Irwin appointed John D. Goodwin to serve as the district judge; he was succeeded by G.G. Clough in 1877, who was the final district judge.

In 1880, the County and District Courts were dissolved and replaced by the Superior Court system under the new California constitution. The first Superior Court judge was G.G. Clough, elected in 1879.

The first purpose-built courthouse was completed in 1859. The land was donated by H.J. Bradley, Joseph Green, and George W. Sharpe. It was replaced by a new courthouse designed by George Sellon and built between 1919 and 1921. Governor William Stephens participated in the dedication ceremony in September 1921. Although jurisdiction is limited to the county, Superior Courts are operated by the state through the Judicial Council, which also is responsible for facilities. Deficiencies have been identified in the existing (1921) courthouse owned by the county, but cuts to the Judicial Council budget forced the indefinite delay of a replacement building on October 26, 2012.

== Venues ==
Plumas County Superior Court location:
1 520 Main St (Quincy)

The main courthouse is in Quincy, the county seat.
