= Sonora, California =

City in California, United States

- City
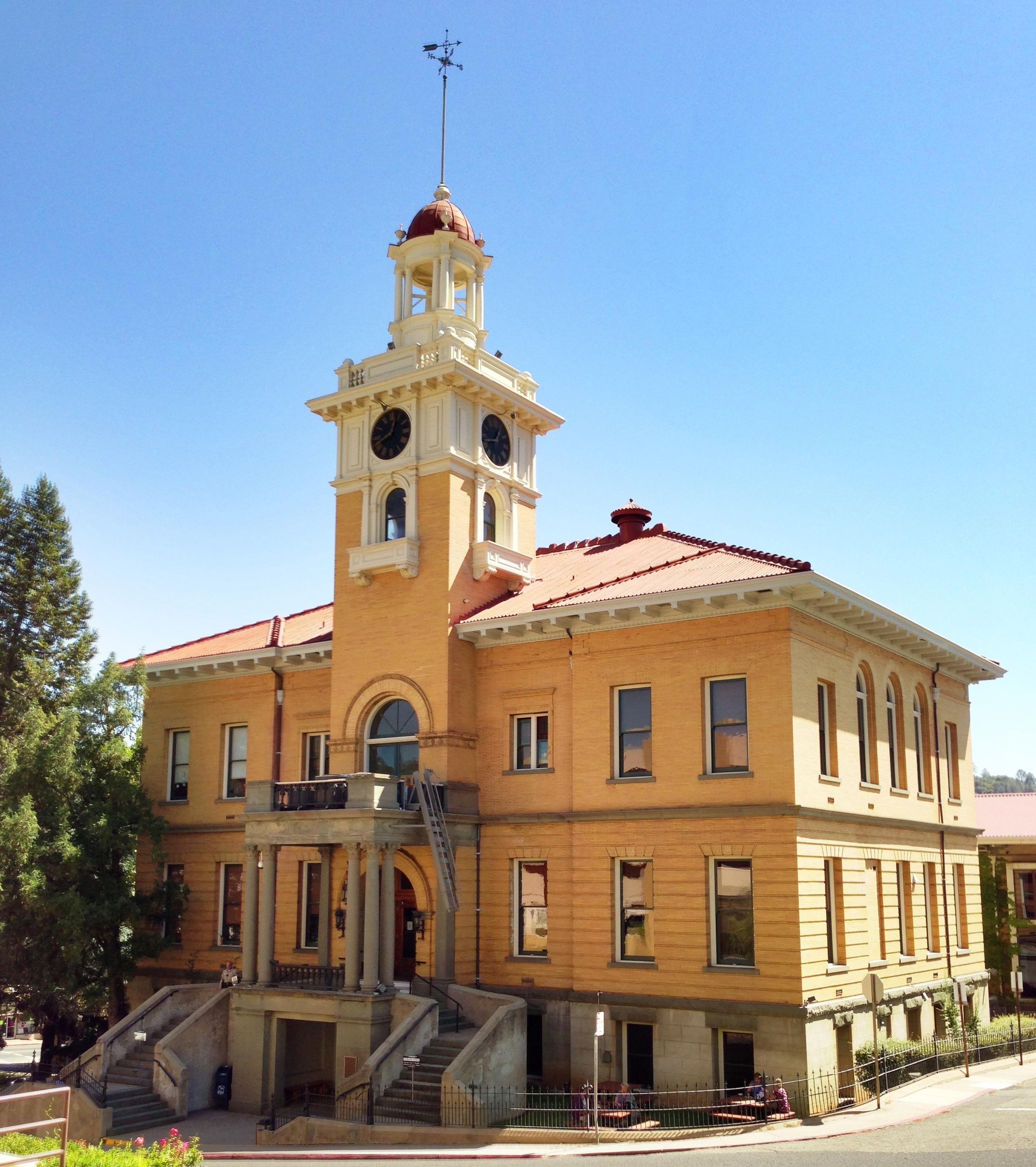
- Tuolumne County Courthouse
- Nickname: Queen of the Southern Mines
- Interactive map of Sonora, California
- Location within California Location within the United States
- Coordinates: 37°59′34″N 120°22′48″W
- Country: United States
- State: California
- County: Tuolumne
- Incorporated: February 15, 1850

Government
  - Mayor: Ann Segerstrom
  - Mayor Pro-Tem: Andy Merrill
  - City Council: Bess Levine; Stephen Opie; Mark Plummer

Area
  - Total: 3.18 sq mi (8.23 km^{2})
  - Land: 3.16 sq mi (8.19 km^{2})
  - Water: 0.015 sq mi (0.04 km^{2}) 0.43%
- Elevation: 1,207 ft (368 m)

Population (2020)
  - Total: 5,003
  - Density: 1,580/sq mi (611/km^{2})
- Time zone: UTC−08:00 (PST)
  - Summer (DST): UTC−07:00 (PDT)
- ZIP Codes: 95370, 95373
- Area code: 209
- FIPS code: 06-72674
- GNIS feature ID: 2411930
- Website: www.sonoraca.com

Sonora is the only incorporated city in Tuolumne County, California, United States, of which it is also the county seat. Founded during the California Gold Rush by Mexican miners from Sonora (after which the city is named), the city population was 5,003 during the 2020 census, an increase from the 4,610 counted during the 2010 census.

== History ==
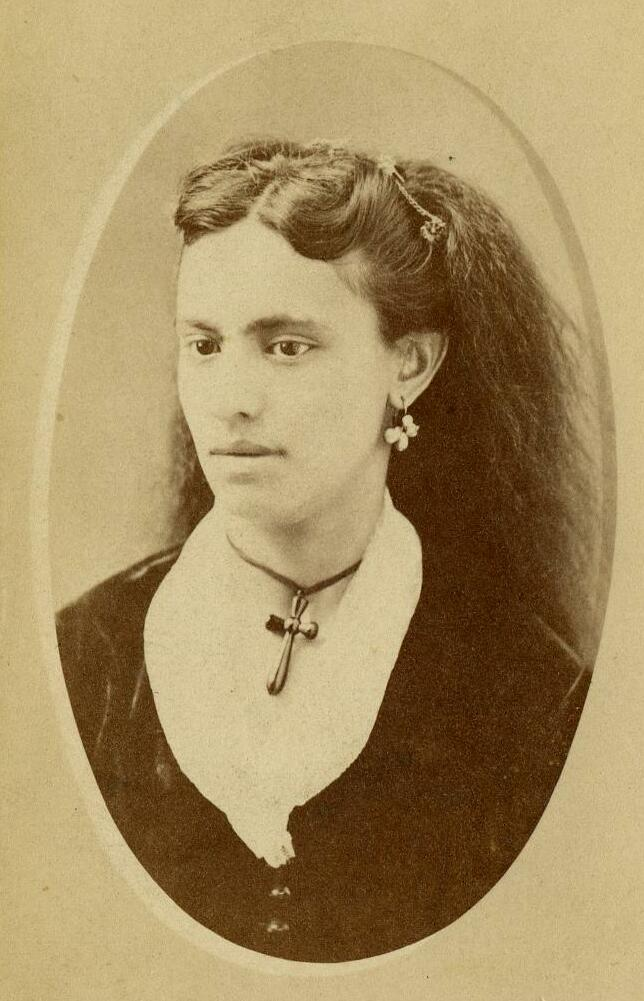
Teresa Salas, a Californio socialite, was a figure in early Sonora society.

Sonora was founded by Mexican miners during the California gold rush. Sonorans were alongside Chileans among the most experienced miners in the rush. Named after their home state of Sonora, Mexico, it was once a booming center of industry and trade in California's Mother Lode. Most of the gold removable with traditional mining techniques was quickly extracted, leaving miners to use more complex and expensive mining techniques to reach deep pockets of quartz and gold. Sonora as well as other mining towns of the era experienced economic hardship when the value of gold decreased. As "gold fever" died down, Sonora's size and population steadily decreased over the years. In c. 1851, the Sonora Hebrew Cemetery was formed by the Hebrew Benevolent Society and predominantly contains the graves of European-born Jews who emigrated to Gold Country.

The Tuolumne County Museum and History Center preserves the town's Gold Rush legacy.

== Geography ==
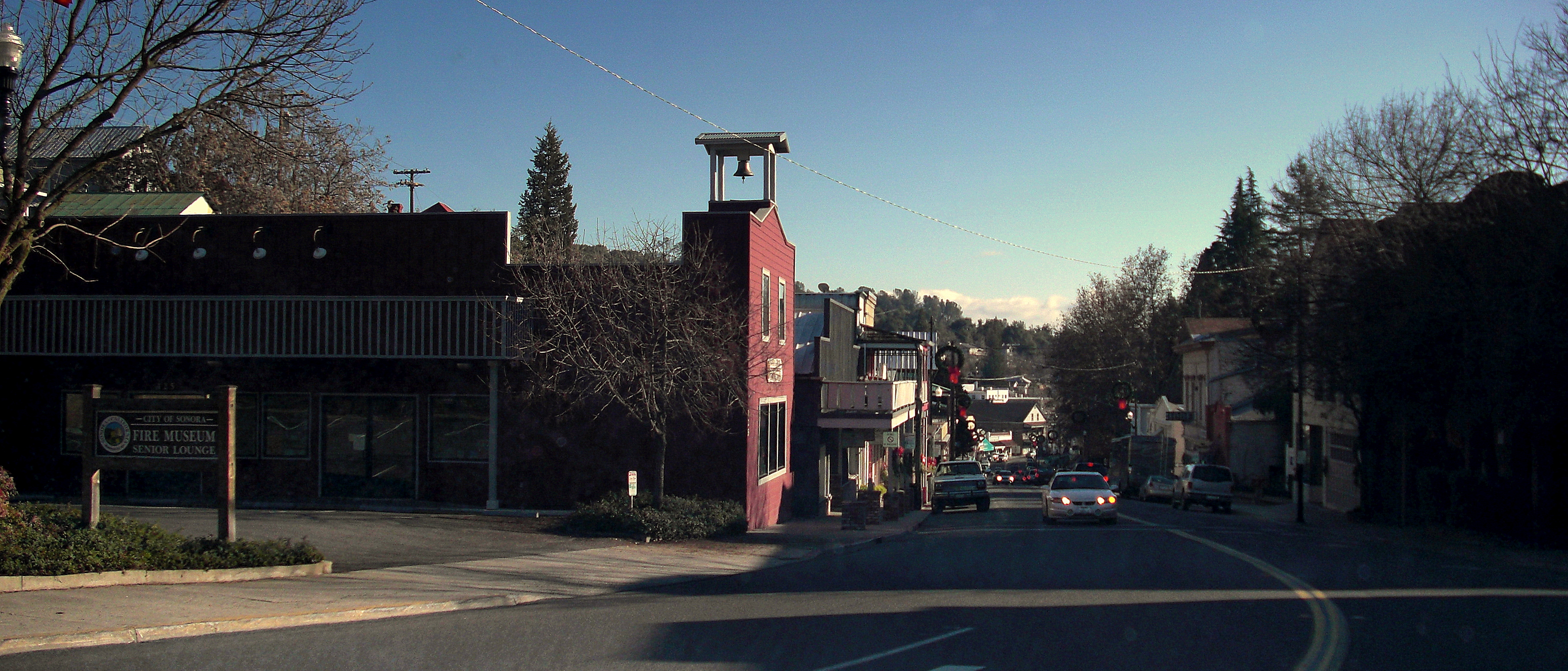
California State Highway 49 along North Washington Street

Sonora is located around the intersection of California State Highways 49 and 108 The altitude is 1,825 feet (556 m). According to the United States Census Bureau, the city covers a total area of 3.2 square miles (8.3 km^{2}), making it the county's largest community by land area. A total of 99.57% of the area is land and 0.43% is water.

=== Climate ===
There are an average of 75 days annually with highs of 90 °F (32.2 °C) or higher and an average of 65.5 days annually with lows of 32 °F (0 °C) or lower. The record high temperature was 113 °F (45 °C) on June 22, 1961, and July 15, 1972. The record low temperature was 8 °F (−13.3 °C) on December 9, 1972.

Average annual rainfall is 32.79 inches (832.9 mm), almost all from November through April, although there are occasionally afternoon and evening thunderstorms in the summer months, which drift down from the Sierra Nevada. There are an average of 63.8 days annually with measurable precipitation. The wettest "rain year" has been from July 1982 to June 1983 with 60.29 inches (1,531.4 mm) and the driest from July 1975 to June 1976 with 15.26 inches (387.6 mm). The most rainfall in one month was 21.69 inches (550.9 mm) in December 1955, including 7.1 inches (180.3 mm) on December 27, the record 24-hour rainfall. The most snowfall in one month was 30.5 inches (77.5 cm) in January 1933. The Köppen Climate Classification subtype for this climate is Csa (hot-summer Mediterranean climate).

Climate data for Sonora, California, 1991–2020 normals, extremes 1906–present
| Month | Jan | Feb | Mar | Apr | May | Jun | Jul | Aug | Sep | Oct | Nov | Dec | Year |
|---|---|---|---|---|---|---|---|---|---|---|---|---|---|
| Record high °F (°C) | 75 (24) | 78 (26) | 84 (29) | 92 (33) | 103 (39) | 113 (45) | 113 (45) | 110 (43) | 110 (43) | 100 (38) | 89 (32) | 81 (27) | 113 (45) |
| Mean maximum °F (°C) | 68.4 (20.2) | 70.4 (21.3) | 75.5 (24.2) | 82.5 (28.1) | 91.6 (33.1) | 99.3 (37.4) | 102.7 (39.3) | 101.8 (38.8) | 98.1 (36.7) | 89.6 (32.0) | 77.5 (25.3) | 68.2 (20.1) | 104.4 (40.2) |
| Mean daily maximum °F (°C) | 55.7 (13.2) | 58.2 (14.6) | 62.1 (16.7) | 66.7 (19.3) | 75.6 (24.2) | 85.3 (29.6) | 92.8 (33.8) | 91.9 (33.3) | 86.7 (30.4) | 76.2 (24.6) | 63.2 (17.3) | 55.1 (12.8) | 72.5 (22.5) |
| Daily mean °F (°C) | 44.3 (6.8) | 46.2 (7.9) | 49.5 (9.7) | 53.2 (11.8) | 60.6 (15.9) | 68.0 (20.0) | 74.8 (23.8) | 73.7 (23.2) | 68.8 (20.4) | 59.6 (15.3) | 49.8 (9.9) | 43.8 (6.6) | 57.7 (14.3) |
| Mean daily minimum °F (°C) | 32.8 (0.4) | 34.2 (1.2) | 37.0 (2.8) | 39.7 (4.3) | 45.5 (7.5) | 50.8 (10.4) | 56.8 (13.8) | 55.5 (13.1) | 50.8 (10.4) | 43.0 (6.1) | 36.4 (2.4) | 32.4 (0.2) | 42.9 (6.1) |
| Mean minimum °F (°C) | 23.9 (−4.5) | 25.7 (−3.5) | 28.3 (−2.1) | 30.7 (−0.7) | 36.1 (2.3) | 41.5 (5.3) | 49.8 (9.9) | 49.0 (9.4) | 42.4 (5.8) | 34.4 (1.3) | 27.6 (−2.4) | 23.6 (−4.7) | 21.5 (−5.8) |
| Record low °F (°C) | 13 (−11) | 15 (−9) | 20 (−7) | 24 (−4) | 24 (−4) | 34 (1) | 36 (2) | 38 (3) | 35 (2) | 25 (−4) | 21 (−6) | 8 (−13) | 8 (−13) |
| Average precipitation inches (mm) | 6.32 (161) | 5.50 (140) | 5.37 (136) | 3.03 (77) | 1.54 (39) | 0.34 (8.6) | 0.03 (0.76) | 0.07 (1.8) | 0.20 (5.1) | 1.64 (42) | 3.24 (82) | 5.51 (140) | 32.79 (833.26) |
| Average snowfall inches (cm) | 2.3 (5.8) | 1.0 (2.5) | 0.5 (1.3) | 0.1 (0.25) | 0.0 (0.0) | 0.0 (0.0) | 0.0 (0.0) | 0.0 (0.0) | 0.0 (0.0) | 0.0 (0.0) | 0.0 (0.0) | 0.7 (1.8) | 4.6 (11.65) |
| Average precipitation days (≥ 0.01 in) | 10.3 | 9.7 | 9.7 | 6.4 | 3.9 | 1.4 | 0.2 | 0.5 | 0.9 | 3.7 | 7.1 | 10.0 | 63.8 |
Source 1: NOAA
Source 2: National Weather Service

== Demographics ==
Historical population
| Census | Pop. | Note | %± |
|---|---|---|---|
| 1860 | 1,960 | | — |
| 1870 | 1,322 | | −32.6% |
| 1880 | 1,492 | | 12.9% |
| 1890 | 1,441 | | −3.4% |
| 1900 | 1,922 | | 33.4% |
| 1910 | 2,029 | | 5.6% |
| 1920 | 1,684 | | −17.0% |
| 1930 | 2,278 | | 35.3% |
| 1940 | 2,257 | | −0.9% |
| 1950 | 2,448 | | 8.5% |
| 1960 | 2,725 | | 11.3% |
| 1970 | 3,100 | | 13.8% |
| 1980 | 3,247 | | 4.7% |
| 1990 | 4,153 | | 27.9% |
| 2000 | 4,423 | | 6.5% |
| 2010 | 4,610 | | 4.2% |
| 2020 | 5,003 | | 8.5% |
U.S. Decennial Census; 1850–1870 1880–1890; 1900 1910 1920; 1930 1940 1950; 1960 1970 1980; 1990 2000 2010

=== 2020 census ===
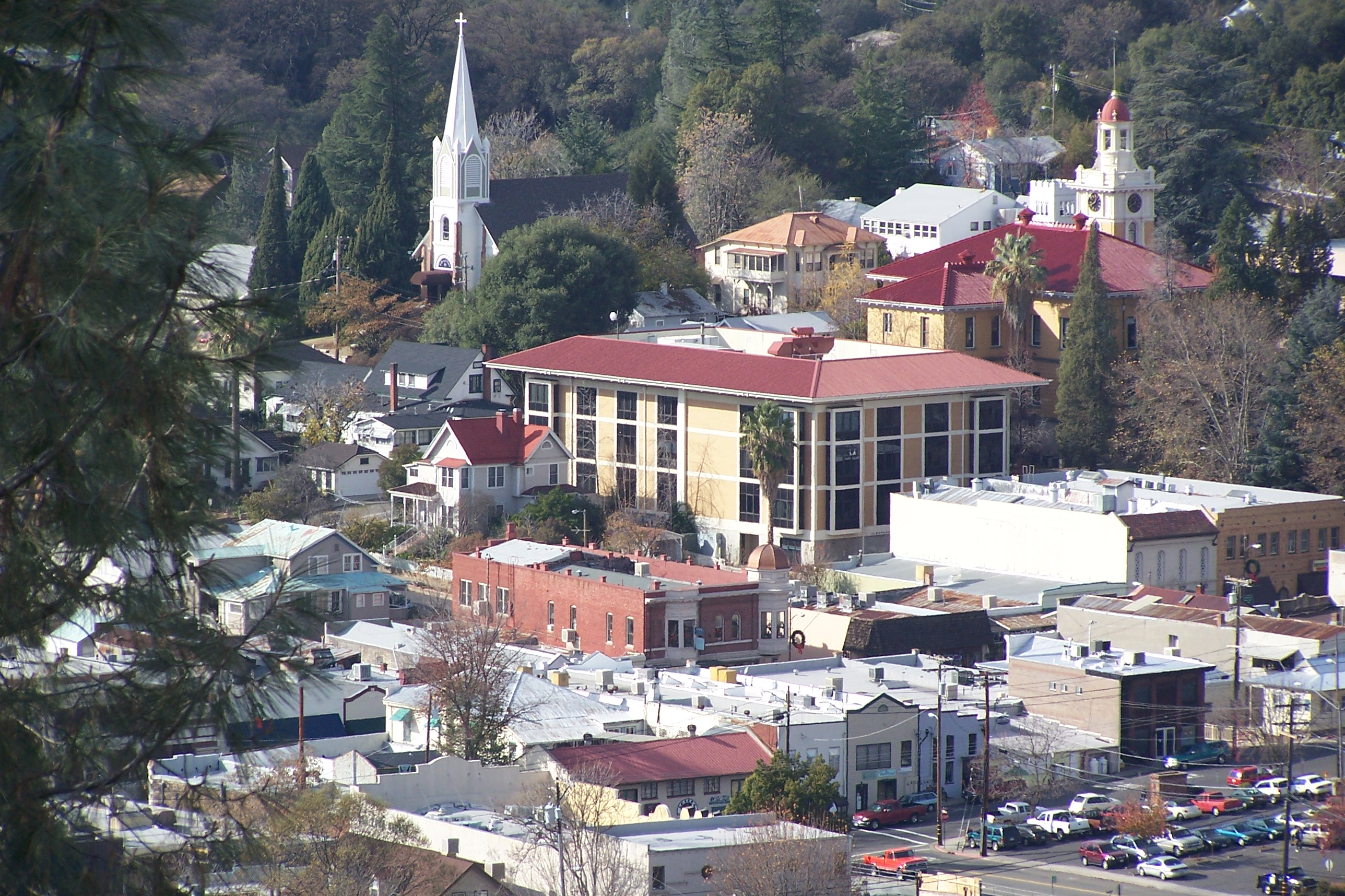
Downtown Sonora during the winter

As of the 2020 census, Sonora had a population of 5,003. The population density was 1,581.7 inhabitants per square mile (610.7/km^{2}). The median age was 41.4 years. The age distribution was 18.8% under the age of 18, 8.4% aged 18 to 24, 26.9% aged 25 to 44, 24.1% aged 45 to 64, and 21.7% who were 65 years of age or older. For every 100 females, there were 87.6 males, and for every 100 females age 18 and over, there were 85.3 males age 18 and over.

The census reported that 97.8% of the population lived in households, 0.7% lived in non-institutionalized group quarters, and 1.5% were institutionalized. In addition, 99.8% of residents lived in urban areas, while 0.2% lived in rural areas.

There were 2,301 households, of which 26.8% had children under the age of 18 living in them. Of all households, 30.2% were married-couple households, 9.4% were cohabiting-couple households, 22.3% had a male householder with no spouse or partner present, and 38.0% had a female householder with no spouse or partner present. About 39.1% of all households were made up of individuals and 16.6% had someone living alone who was 65 years of age or older. The average household size was 2.13, and there were 1,163 families (50.5% of all households).

There were 2,515 housing units at an average density of 795.1 units per square mile (307.0 units/km^{2}). Of all housing units, 91.5% were occupied, including 42.0% owner-occupied and 58.0% occupied by renters, while 8.5% were vacant. The homeowner vacancy rate was 1.7% and the rental vacancy rate was 2.7%.

Racial composition as of the 2020 census
| Race | Number | Percent |
|---|---|---|
| White | 4,001 | 80.0% |
| Black or African American | 27 | 0.5% |
| American Indian and Alaska Native | 78 | 1.6% |
| Asian | 149 | 3.0% |
| Native Hawaiian and Other Pacific Islander | 22 | 0.4% |
| Some other race | 170 | 3.4% |
| Two or more races | 556 | 11.1% |
| Hispanic or Latino (of any race) | 657 | 13.1% |

=== Per capita income ===
In 2023, the US Census Bureau estimated that the median household income was $62,621, and the per capita income was $39,503. About 17.4% of families and 20.0% of the population were below the poverty line.

=== 2010 census ===
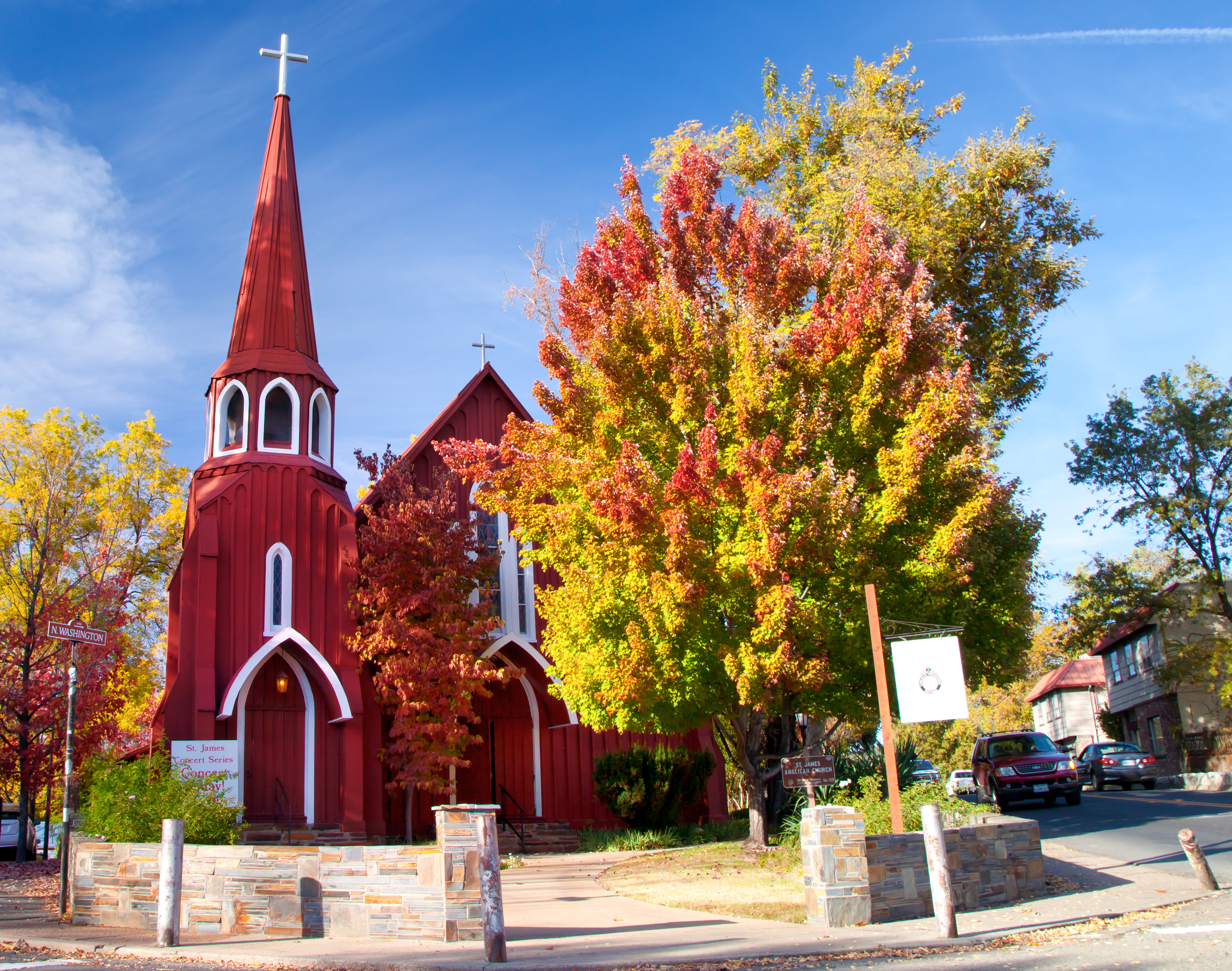
St. James Episcopal Church

At the 2010 census Sonora had a population of 4,903. The population density was 1,593.0 inhabitants per square mile (615.1/km^{2}). The racial makeup of Sonora was 4,402 (89.8%) White, 24 (0.5%) African American, 95 (1.9%) Native American, 79 (1.6%) Asian, 12 (0.2%) Pacific Islander, 84 (1.7%) from other races, and 207 (4.2%) from two or more races. Hispanic or Latino of any race were 542 people (11.1%).

The census reported that 4,613 people (94.1% of the population) lived in households, 85 (1.7%) lived in non-institutionalized group quarters, and 205 (4.2%) were institutionalized.

There were 2,199 households, 562 (25.6%) had children under the age of 18 living in them, 689 (31.3%) were opposite-sex married couples living together, 308 (14.0%) had a female householder with no husband present, 116 (5.3%) had a male householder with no wife present. There were 192 (8.7%) unmarried opposite-sex partnerships, and 12 (0.5%) same-sex married couples or partnerships. 881 households (40.1%) were one person and 312 (14.2%) had someone living alone who was 65 or older. The average household size was 2.10. There were 1,113 families (50.6% of households); the average family size was 2.77.

The age distribution was 975 people (19.9%) under the age of 18, 526 people (10.7%) aged 18 to 24, 1,266 people (25.8%) aged 25 to 44, 1,324 people (27.0%) aged 45 to 64, and 812 people (16.6%) who were 65 or older. The median age was 39.7 years. For every 100 females, there were 93.0 males. For every 100 females age 18 and over, there were 89.9 males.

There were 2,463 housing units at an average density of 800.2 per square mile; of the occupied units, 898 (40.8%) were owner-occupied and 1,301 (59.2%) were rented. The homeowner vacancy rate was 4.6%; the rental vacancy rate was 8.6%. 1,960 people (40.0% of the population) lived in owner-occupied housing units and 2,653 people (54.1%) lived in rental housing units.

== Economy and tourism ==
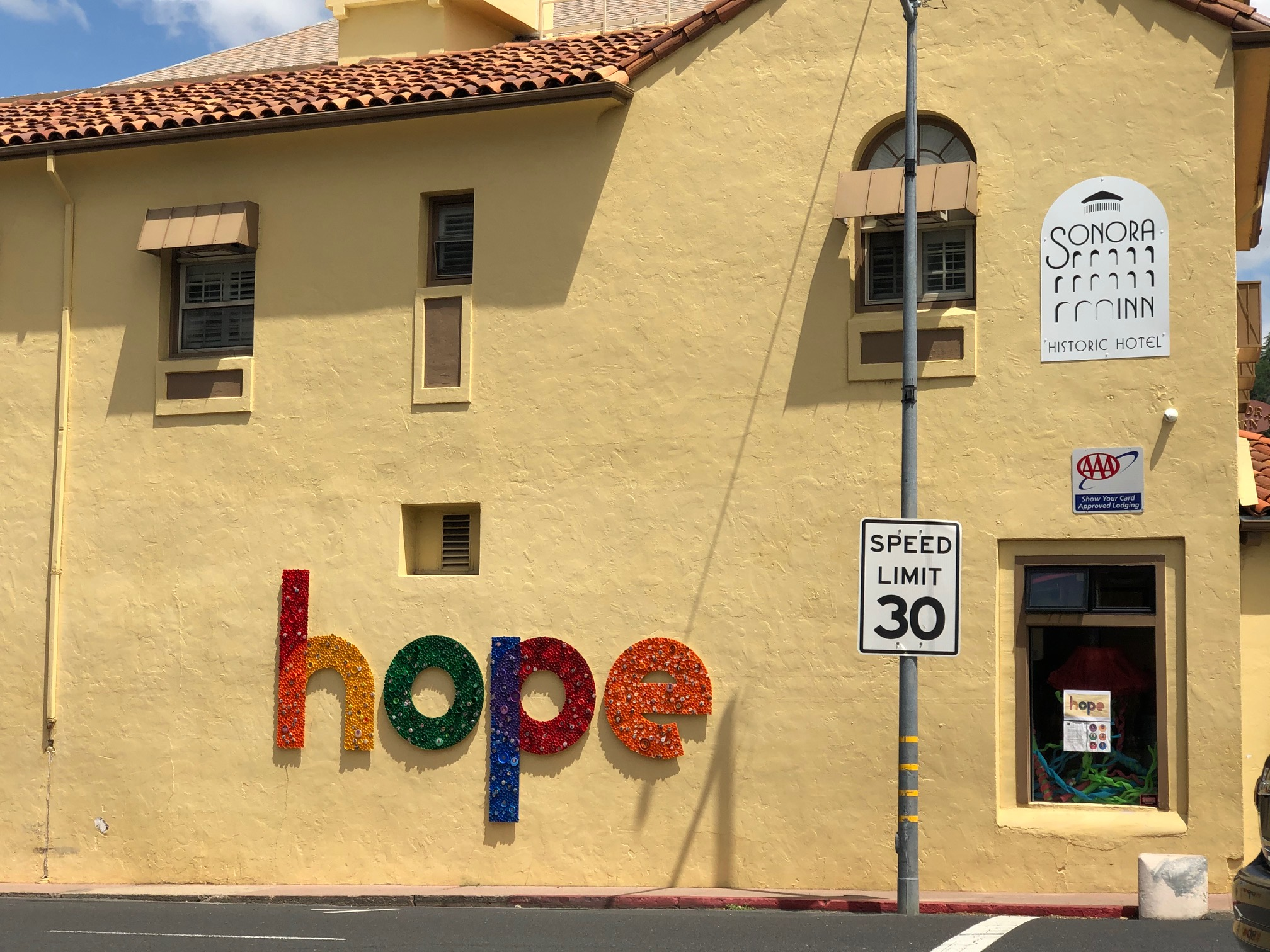
The historic Mission Revival–style Sonora Inn, built in 1896

The area economy was historically based on the mining and timber industries, but now relies on tourism. One of two active lumber mills in Tuolumne County was shut down in 2009, but reopened in July 2011.

As a city close to Yosemite National Park, Sonora provides services to some of Yosemite's visitors. The city also benefits from its proximity to Railtown 1897 State Historic Park and Columbia State Park.

== Education ==
The city's schools include its namesake educational institutions Sonora Union High School and Sonora Elementary School, as well as Dario Cassina High and the Foothill Horizons Outdoor School.

Columbia Community College is part of Yosemite Community College District (YCCD) which also includes Modesto Junior College. It is the sole college in Tuolumne County and offers two-year degrees. Individuals wishing to attend a university must commute 50 miles to University of California, Merced, or to California State University, Stanislaus, in Turlock.

== Government and politics ==
Sonora uses a city council consisting of five council members, including the mayor. The city council appoints a city administrator to implement the council's policies and enforce ordinances. As of June 2024, the current mayor of Sonora is Ann Segerstrom and the current city administrator is Melissa Eads.

In the California State Legislature, Sonora is in the 4th senatorial district, represented by Republican Marie Alvarado-Gil, and in the 8th Assembly district, represented by Republican David Tangipa.

In the United States House of Representatives, Sonora is in California's 5th congressional district, represented by Republican Tom McClintock.

== Culture and arts ==
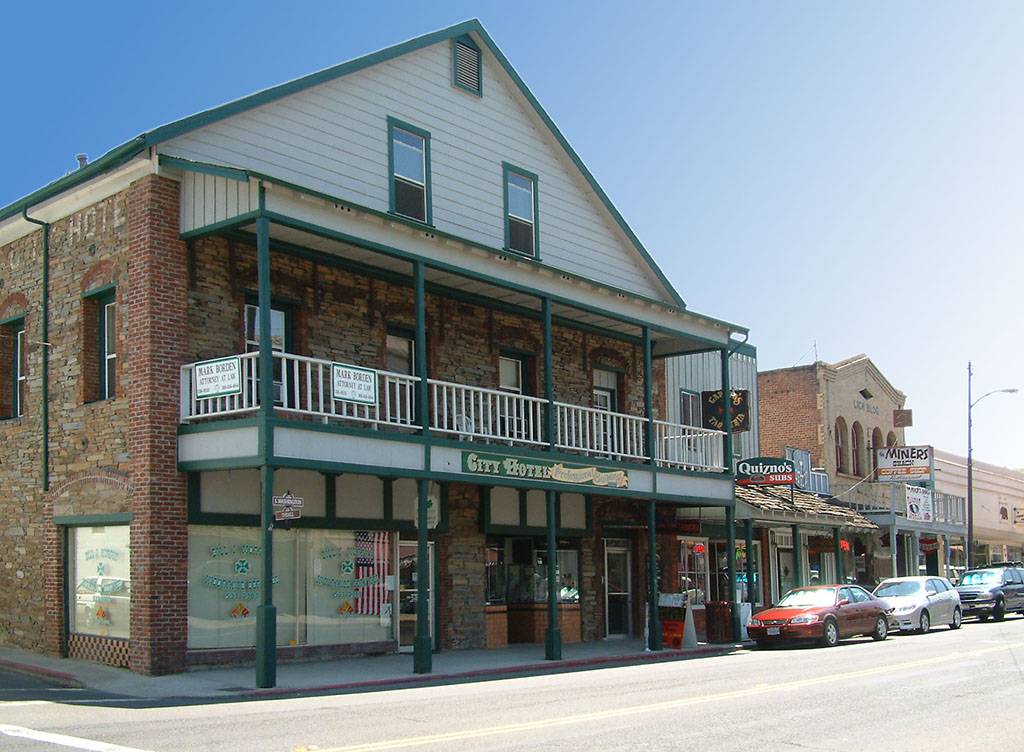
The historic City Hotel, built in 1852

The newspaper of record for the Sonora area is The Union Democrat.

The Tuolumne County Film Commission describes Sonora as "one of the country's most versatile locations", where more than "300 film[s] and television series" have been made.

Local museums depict the Gold Rush era and historic Sonora.

The small town is home to the professional theatre company Sierra Repertory Theatre, which produces a variety of musicals and plays each year at two different theatre buildings: the East Sonora Theatre, and the Fallon House Theatre in Columbia.

Sonora is also home to the Tuolumne County Arts Alliance.

The pilot, and various scenes, of the television show Little House on the Prairie was filmed in Sonora.

David Carkeet's 2005 memoir, Campus Sexpot, describes his and the Sonora community's reaction to Dale Koby's early 1960s cult/underground novel, also titled Campus Sexpot, and its thinly-veiled description of the town, fictionalized as "Wattsville".

== Notable people ==
- Vaughn Armstrong, actor
- Melvin Belli, attorney
- David Carkeet, writer
- Jack Cassinetto, painter
- Phil Coke, MLB pitcher
- Molly Culver, actress
- Charles Dellschau, artist
- T.J. Dillashaw, UFC bantamweight champion
- Ross Dwelley, NFL tight end
- Larry Franco, film producer
- James P. Hogan, writer
- Jenny O'Hara, actress
- Josh Parry, NFL fullback
- Dan Pastorini, NFL quarterback
- Francis "Rocco" Prestia, bassist for Tower of Power
- Tata Vega, entertainer
- Kahale Warring, NFL tight end
- Jason Snell (writer), Writer
