= Lassen County Superior Court =

California superior court with jurisdiction over Lassen County

Superior Court of California, County of Lassen
- Interactive map of Superior Court of California, County of Lassen
- 40.40909°N 120.64022°W
- Established: 1864
- Jurisdiction: Lassen County, California
- Location: Susanville (county seat)
- Coordinates: 40.40909°N 120.64022°W
- Appeals to: California Court of Appeal for the Third District
- Annual budget: $2.8 M (FY 2025–26)
- Website: lassen.courts.ca.gov

Presiding Judge
- Currently: Hon. Mark R. Nareau

Assistant Presiding Judge
- Currently: Hon. Robert M. Burns

Acting Court Executive Officer
- Currently: Megan Reed
- Since: Aug 28, 2025

The Superior Court of California, County of Lassen, informally the Lassen County Superior Court, is the California superior court with jurisdiction over Lassen County.

== History ==
Lassen County was partitioned from Plumas and Shasta counties in 1864. I.J. Harvey was appointed as the first County Judge that May. Judge Harvey opened the first session on June 6, 1864. In 1880, the County Court was dissolved and replaced by the Superior Court system under the new California constitution. The first Superior Court judge was J.W. Hendrick, elected in 1879.

At the district level, Judge Gordon N. Mott presided over the First Judicial District of Nevada Territory, which was in Susanville and covered the counties of Storey, Washoe, and Lake (later Roop). The Second Judicial District was established in 1864, consisting of Lassen, Plumas, Butte, and Tehama counties; the first judge was Warren T. Sexton of Butte County, who opened his first term in Susanville on October 10, 1864. Judge Sexton was succeeded by Charles F. Lott in January 1870. A new Twenty-First Judicial District was established in 1876, covering Lassen, Modoc, and Plumas counties; the first judge of the 21st was John D. Goodwin, who was later replaced by G. G. Clough. Judge Clough held the position until the Judicial District was integrated into the Superior Court system under the 1880 constitution.

The county's justice system was divided into Justice Courts, which were equivalent to municipal courts, and a Superior Court, which held jurisdiction over the entire county. The Justice Courts were established in Standish, Susanville, Westwood, Ravendale, and Bieber. The Standish and Ravendale courts were moved into the Susanville location in the mid-1900s, and the Westwood and Bieber courts were integrated into Susanville in 1976, consolidating all Justice Court locations. The Justice Court was renamed to Municipal Court in 1994, and the Municipal and Superior Courts were consolidated in 1999.

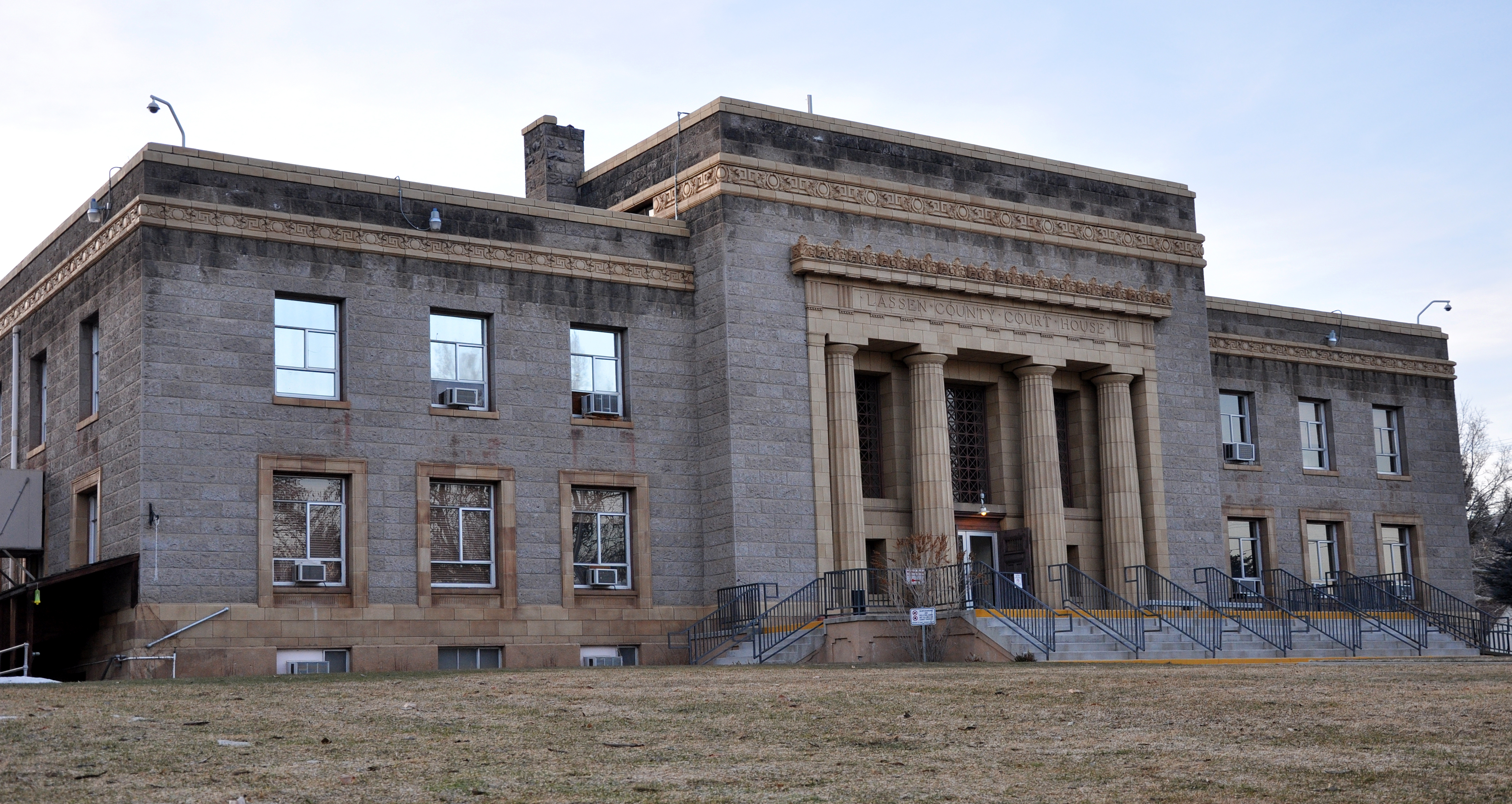
Lassen County Court House (completed 1917)

The first sessions of court were held in the Masonic Lodge and Magnolia Saloon until a two-story wooden building was built in 1867. It was succeeded by the Lassen County Court House in Susanville, which was completed in 1917 to a design by George Sellon; courthouse operations were consolidated and moved in 2012 to the new Hall of Justice.

== Venues ==
Lassen County Superior Court locations:
1 2610 Riverside Dr (Hall of Justice)

The historic Lassen County Court House located at 220 S Lassen St in Susanville is currently undergoing renovation and will be home to administration and the Board of Supervisors for Lassen County, California. This location is no longer occupied nor controlled by the Lassen County Superior Court.
