= History of San Jose State University =

Coordinates: 37°20′9″N 121°52′57″W

San José State University traces back to 1857 when the institution operated as a normal school for the San Francisco public school system. It grew in size and scope until May 2, 1862 when the California State Senate adopted a funding bill to turn it into the flagship campus of the California State Normal School System. The southern campus of the normal school would eventually turn into the University of California, Los Angeles, and the California State Normal School System would eventually grow into the California State University system.

== History ==
=== 19th Century ===
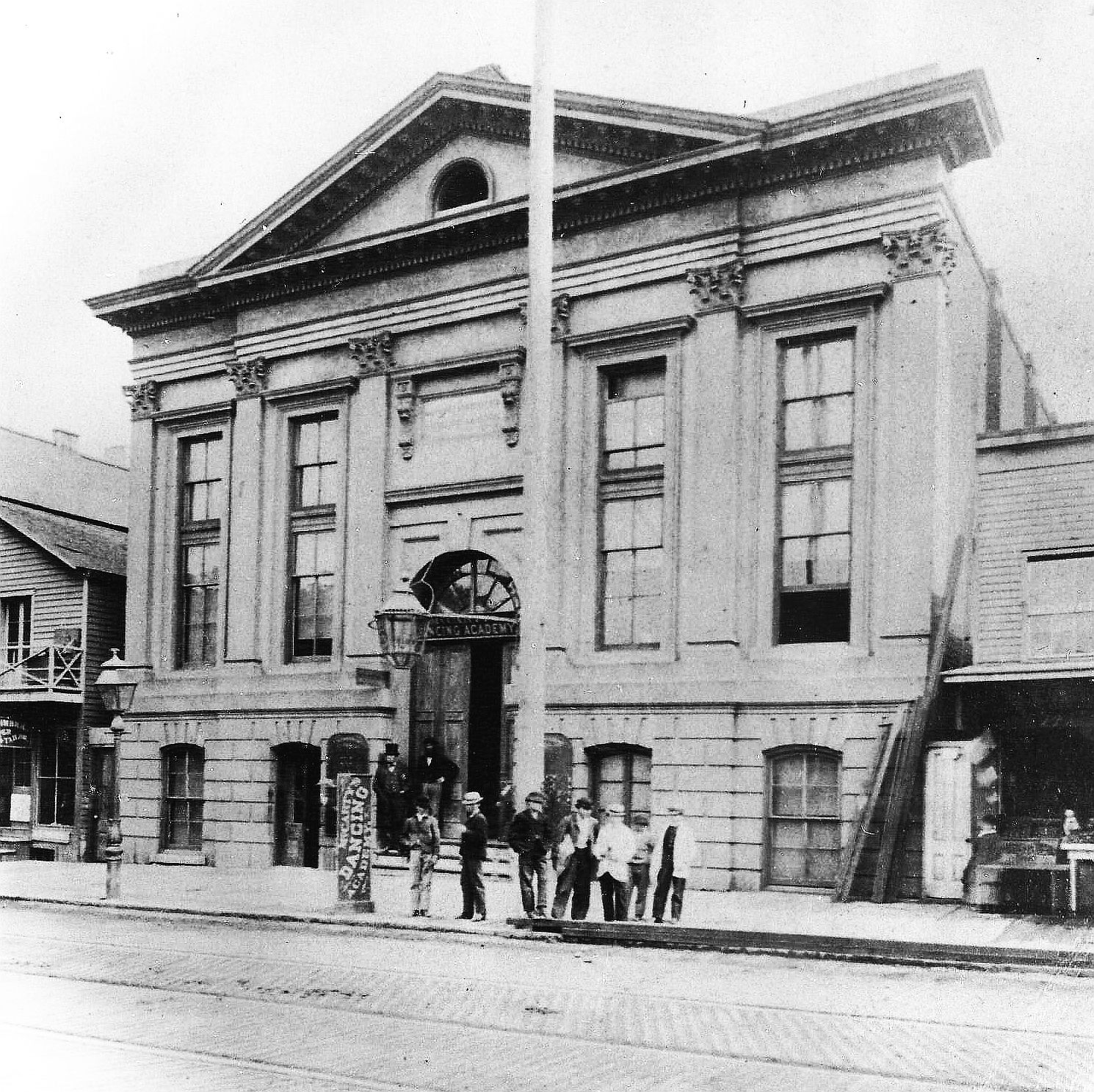
Dashaway Hall, one of six sites in San Francisco that housed the State Normal School before a permanent location was chosen in San Jose.

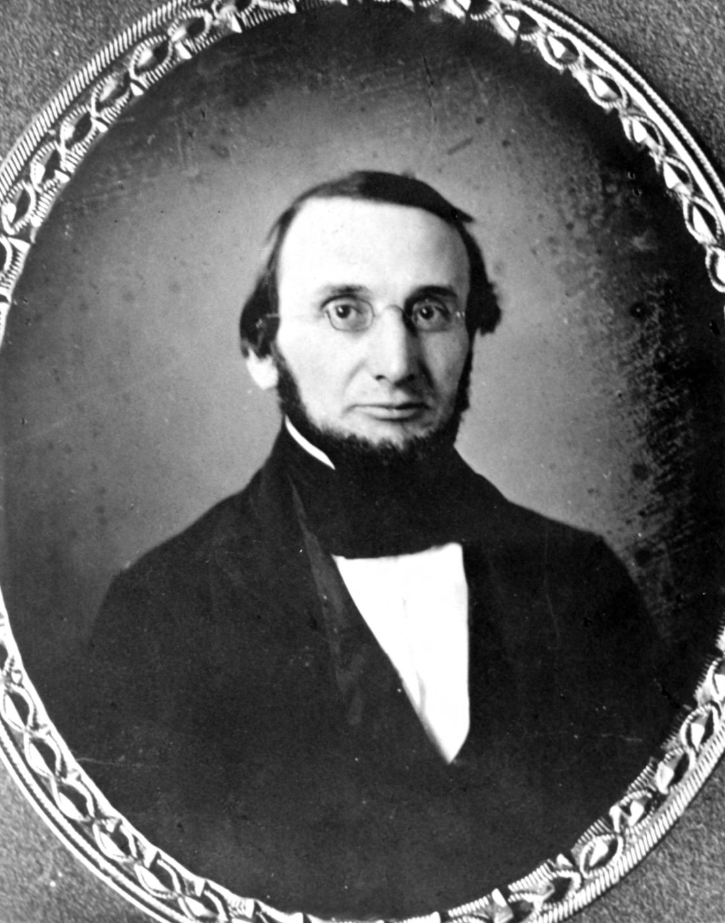
George W. Minns, the first principal of what would become San Jose State University. ^{[Note 1]}

After a private normal school closed in San Francisco after only one year, politicians John Swett and Henry B. Janes sought to establish a normal school for San Francisco's public school system, and approached George W. Minns to be the principal for the nascent institution, with Swett as an assistant principal. The normal school began operations in 1857 and became known as the Minns Evening Normal School. Classes were only held once a week, and only graduated 54 female students across its existence, however the program proved to be enough of a success for increased funding to be approved.

In 1861, after the continued success of the Evening School, superintendent Andrew J. Moulder requested that a committee be formed to create a report on the merits of fully funding a state normal school. Minns and Swett were among several Evening School faculty appointed to the committee, which presented its report to the California State Legislator in January 1862. On May 2, 1862, the California State Senate adopted a statue to fund an initial $3,000 ($96,750 in 2025) for a state normal school and to appoint a board of trustees for the school. The California State Normal School was then opened on July 21, 1862.

Despite continued success, with increasing enrollment and funding, the California State Normal School quickly began to hold contention with the San Francisco Board of Education, which poached students and withheld sufficient school facilities. In 1864, Principal Ahira Holmes went as far as to suggest that the cold, damp, and unventilated rooms of the Old Assembly Hall were responsible for a diphtheria outbreak among that year's students. Because of these issues, the Normal School moved sites six times while in San Francisco, citing noise complaints, sanitary concerns, and lack of access to proper facilities and materials.

In 1868, more serious talks of finding a permanent location for the Normal School began, with a general consensus that the school needed to cut ties with the San Francisco Board of Education and move out of San Francisco. On the December 15th, 1868 board of trustees meeting, State Superintendent Oscar P. Fitzgerald was authorized to begin discussions with the Regents of the University of California about the possibility of merging the University of California and the California State Normal School, though discussions ended quickly. After it became public that the Normal School was looking to move for a permanent location, several cities put in bids to home the school, including San Jose, Santa Clara, Vallejo, Stockton, Martinez, and Oakland. However after the San Jose Railroad Company paid to have the entire student and faculty body tour the city and potential locations for the school, San Jose became the preferred site. The school moved to San Jose in 1871 and was given Washington Square Park at S. 4th and San Carlos Streets, where the campus remains to this day.

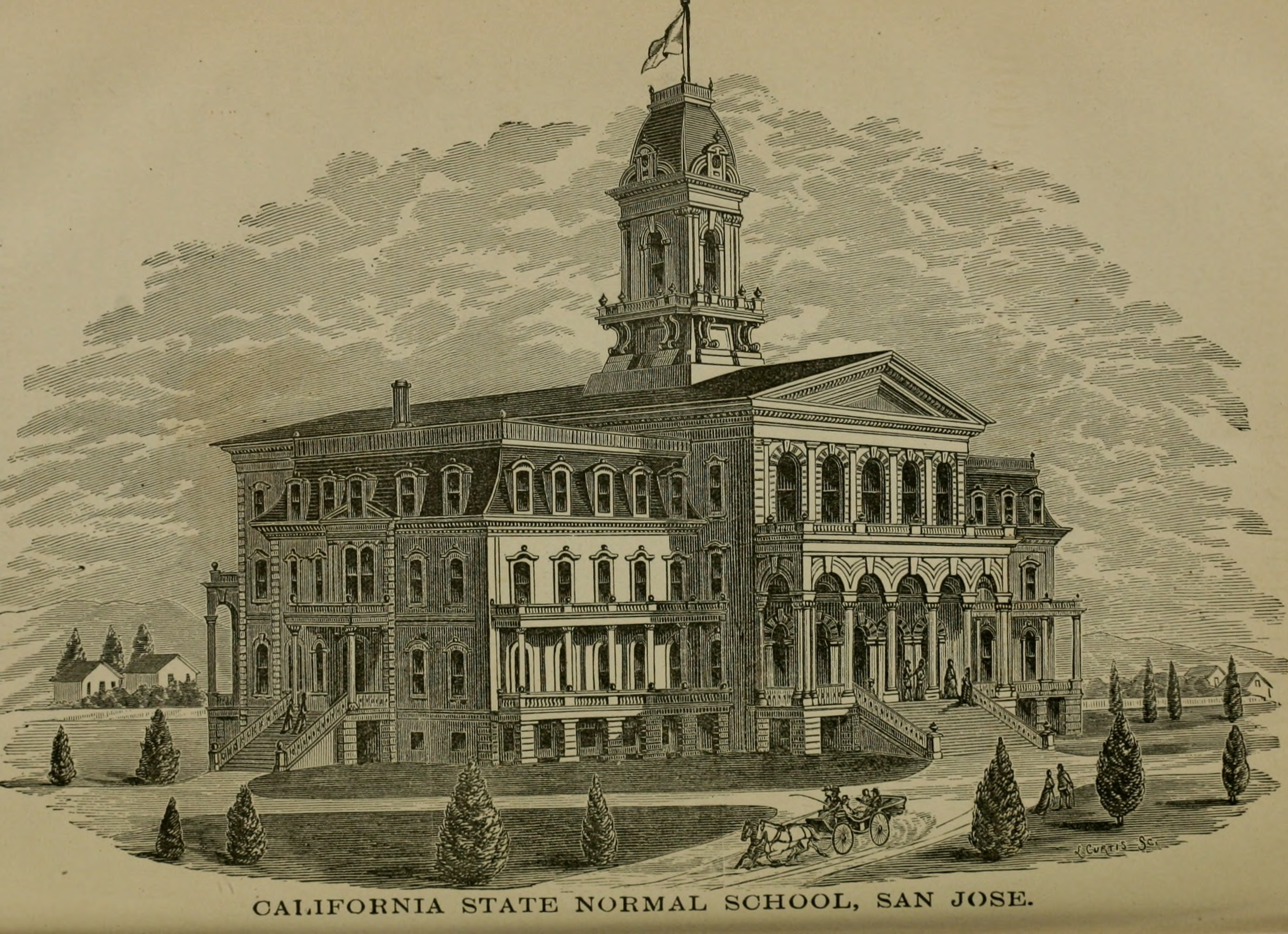
The first building on Washington Square, which was destroyed in a fire in 1880.

The first building on Washington Square was opened in 1872 and fully completed in 1876, as a three story wooden building in a classical style, however in 1880 the building was destroyed in a fire. After its destruction, Principal Charles H. Allen journeyed to Sacramento to request the California State Legislator to issue $200,000 ($6.67 million in 2025) in emergency funds for a new building. This caused significant debate in the senate about the effectiveness of the school and if it would be better served elsewhere. The California State Senate voted to move the school to Los Angeles, but was ultimately kept in San Jose after objections by the California State Assembly. The legislature ultimately settled to give $100,000 in partial emergency funds to the school for the construction of a new building, which finished construction in 1881.

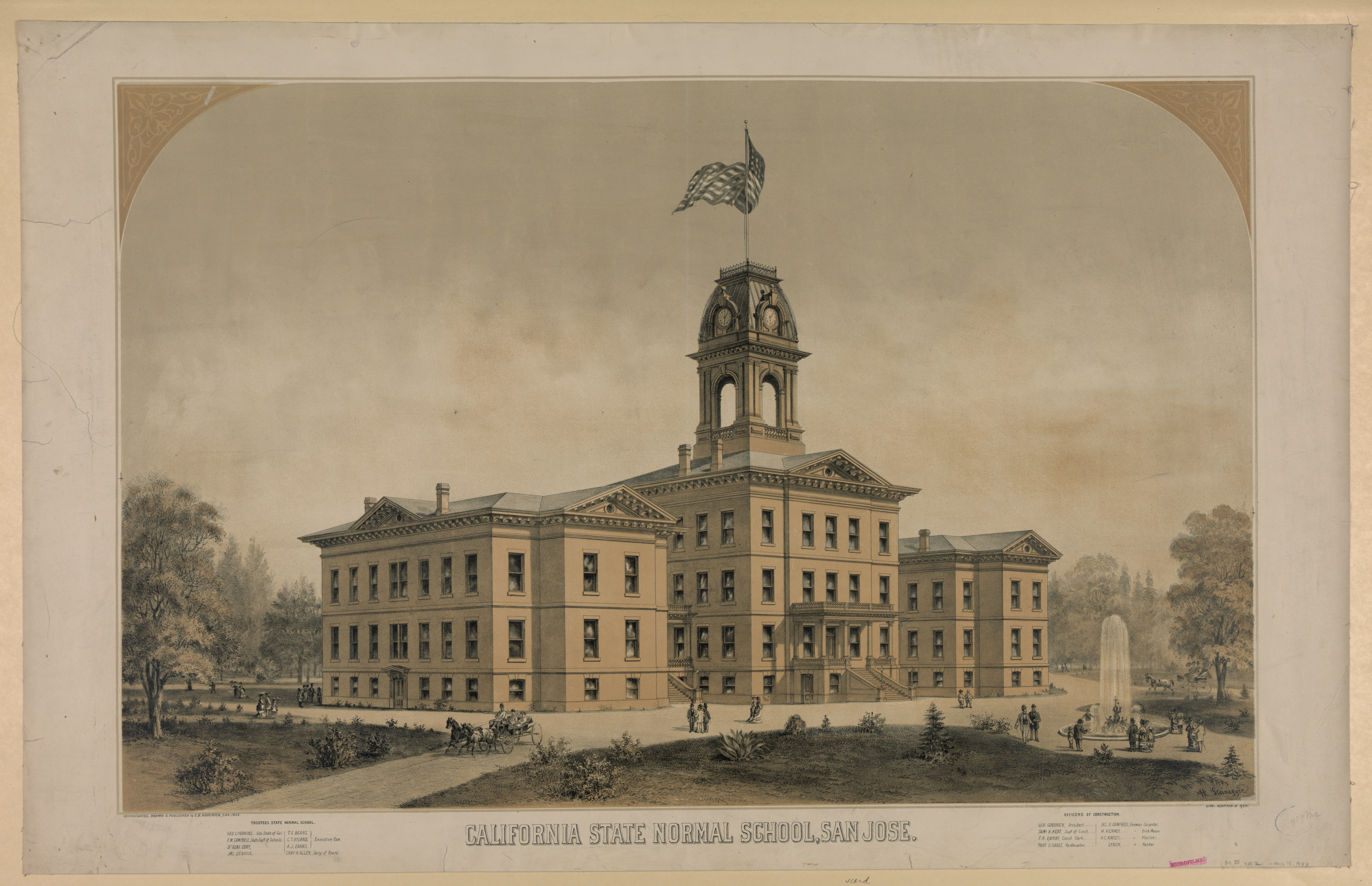
Initially built to replace the building that was destroyed in 1880, the second State Normal School Building was destroyed in the 1906 San Francisco Earthquake

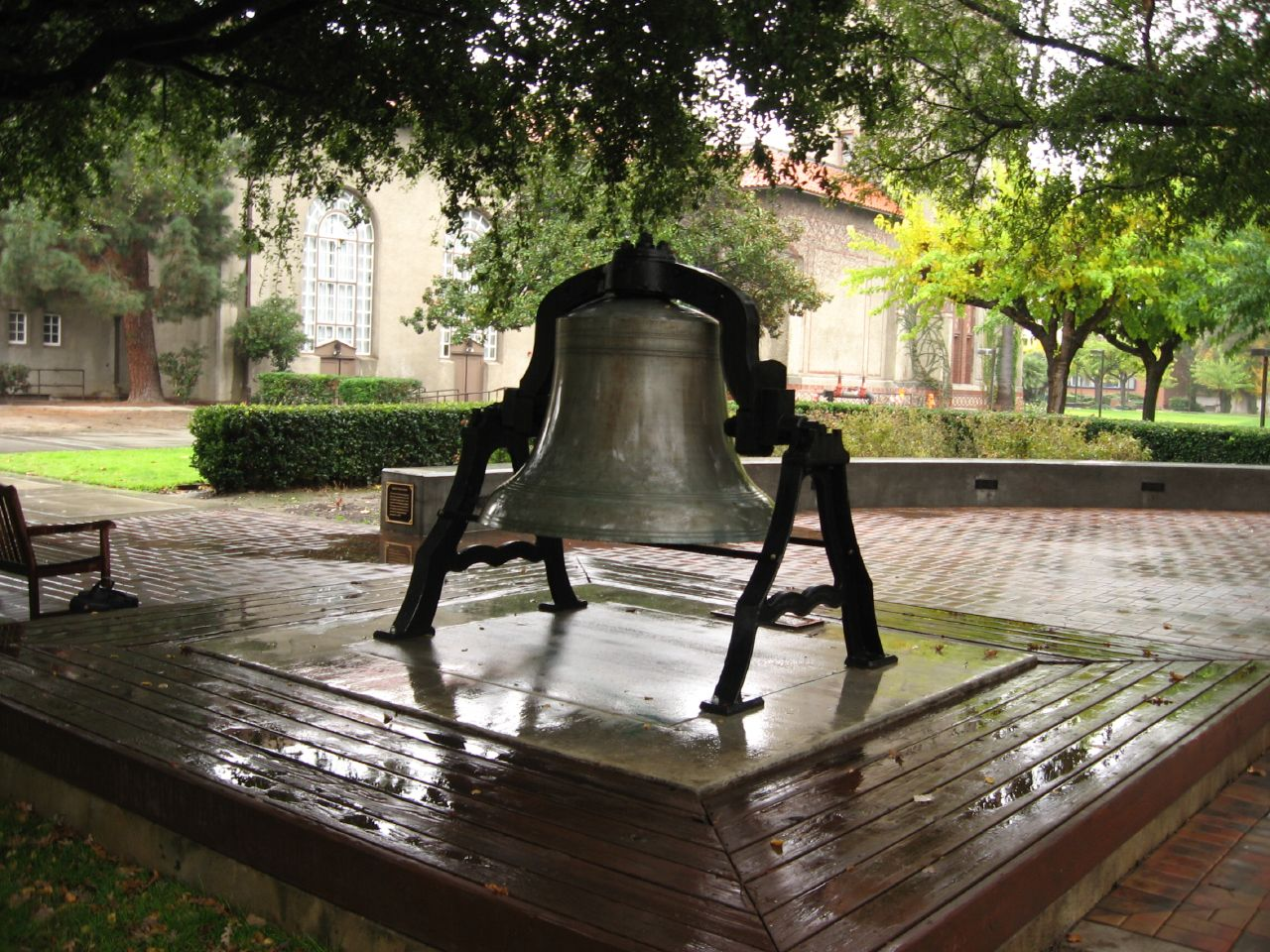
The California State Normal School Bell, forged in 1881, still graces the San Jose campus.

As a part of the construction of the new building, a large bell was forged to commemorate the school. The bell cost $1,200 ($40,034 in 2025), and was inscribed with the words "California State Normal School, A.D. 1881," and would sound every morning at 8AM. After the destruction of the new building in 1906, the bell was only sound on special occasions, until 1946 when the college obtained new chimes. The original bell appears on the SJSU campus to this day and is still associated with various student traditions and rituals.

Immediately after the failed attempt to move State Normal School to Los Angeles, California State Senator J.P. West sponsored a bill to create a "Branch State Normal School" in Los Angeles. The bill was passed by both houses, and opened in August 1882. The southern branch campus was initially under administrative control of the San Jose campus, however southern Californians found the arrangement unsatisfactory, claiming, that the original goal of creating a normal school was to train teachers to work in local schools and serve local needs. Therefore, in 1887, the state legislature decided that the northern and southern branches would have their own boards of trustees. From then until 1921, the State Normal Schools were each governed by their own boards, which meant they did not function as a system in the modern sense. In 1919, the southern branch of the California State Normal School became the southern branch of the University of California, and later became the University of California, Los Angeles.

In 1887, Principal Allen helped to found the Chico State Normal School (which later became California State University, Chico), though the institution was never under administrative control of the San Jose State Normal School, per the arrangement established in 1887. By the end of the 19th century, the State Normal School in San Jose was graduating roughly 130 teachers a year and was "one of the best known normal schools in the West."

=== 20th Century ===
On the morning of April 18, 1906, an earthquake devastated northern California. Although no Normal School building was outright destroyed, the main building received significant structural damage, was deemed unsafe for use, and classes were shifted to be held in either the annex building or held outdoors from April 23rd onward. School President Morris Elmer Dailey missed the earthquake, and was instead in Hamburg, Iowa en route to Europe. However, after hearing the news, and assuming that the entire Normal School had been entirely demolished, he canceled his trip and returned to San Jose, arriving April 25th. On June 8th, $29,000 ($1.04 million in 2025) in emergency funds was granted to assess the potential for repair of the State Normal School Building, however after further inspections, repair of the main building was deemed unfeasible. Discussions for the funding of the new building were lengthy, with both California Governor George C. Pardee, and his successor Governor James N. Gillett, argued that the construction of the new building should only cost $250,000 ($8.96 million in 2025), while Dailey and the school board of trustees argued for as much as $350,000 ($12.5 million in 2025). Ultimately $310,000 ($11.1 million in 2025) was awarded to the school for the construction, while actual costs eventually totaled above $325,000. The new building, finished in 1910 and built in a Spanish Colonial Revival style, became known as Tower Hall, and is still standing today.

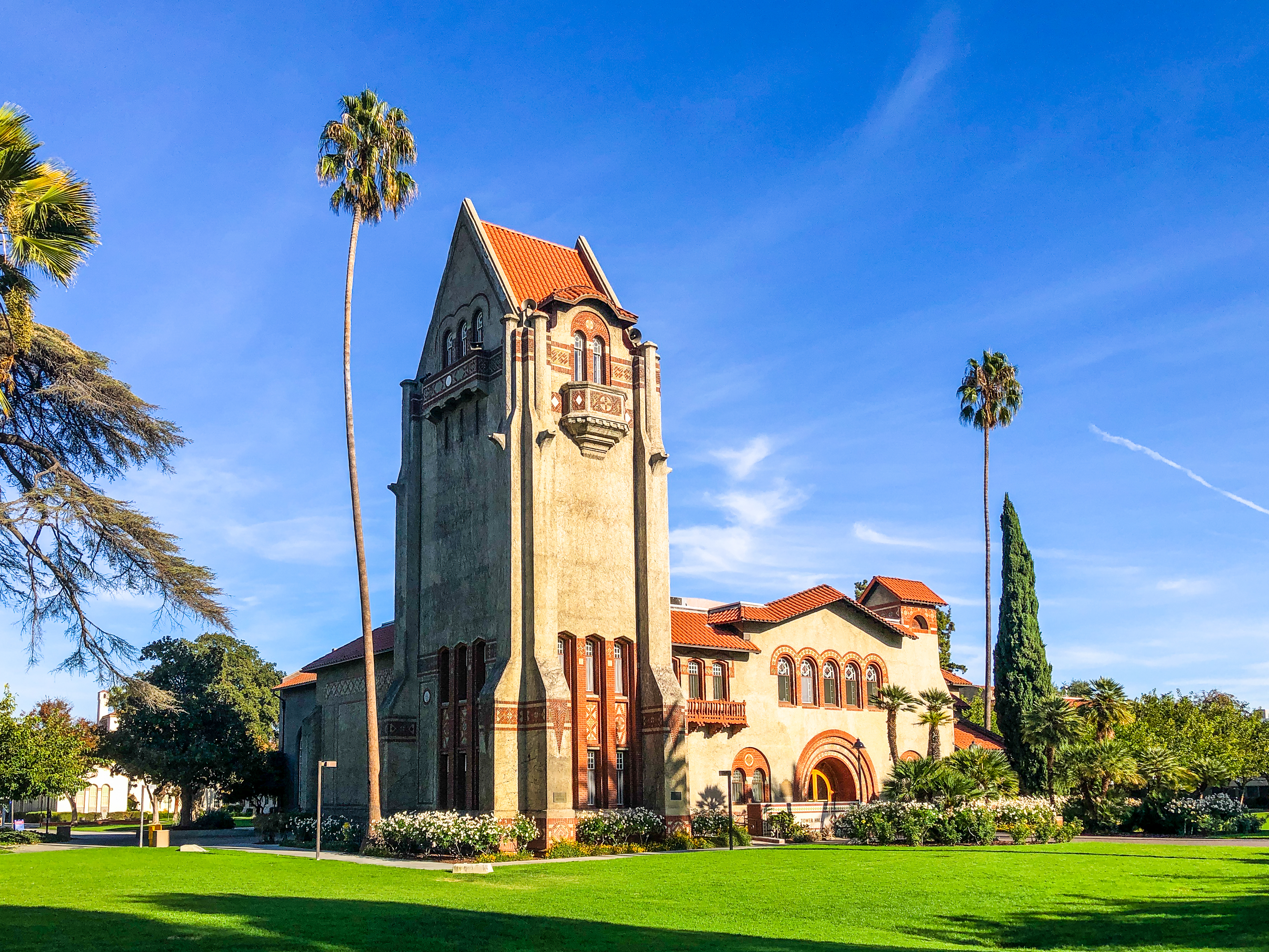
Tower Hall was built in 1910 after significant budget debates.

In 1921, the California State Legislature decreed that the remaining State Normal Schools would henceforth be known as State Teachers Colleges. The original campus became the State Teachers College at San Jose. All boards of trustees were dissolved, and all state teachers college presidents were required to report to the deputy director of the Division of Normal and Special Schools of the new California Department of Education located at the state capital in Sacramento. In 1935, the teachers colleges prevailed after a three-year battle over whether they should be allowed to expand beyond vocational education to provide a broader liberal arts education, one of the traditional prerogatives of the University of California. The state legislature renamed all of them to State Colleges and expressly authorized them to provide four years of liberal arts education culminating in bachelor's degrees. The new San Jose State College was no longer limited to educating exclusively teachers.

In 1922, the State Teachers College at San Jose adopted the Spartans as the school's official mascot and nickname. Mascots and nicknames prior to 1922 included the Daniels, the Teachers, the Pedagogues, the Normals and the Normalites.

In 1930, the Justice Studies Department was founded as a two-year police science degree program. It holds the distinction of offering the first policing degree in the United States. A stone monument and plaque are displayed close to the site of the original police school near Tower Hall.

In 1942, the old gym (now named Yoshihiro Uchida Hall, after SJSU judo coach Yosh Uchida) was used to register and collect Japanese Americans before sending them to internment camps. Uchida's own family members were interred at some of these camps.

In 1963, in an effort to save Tower Hall from demolition, SJSU students and alumni organized testimonials before the State College Board of Trustees, sent telegrams and provided signed petitions. As a result of those efforts, the tower, a principal campus landmark and SJSU icon, was refurbished and reopened in 1966. The tower was again renovated and restored in 2007. Tower Hall is registered with the California Office of Historic Preservation.

During the 1960s and early 1970s, San Jose State College witnessed a rise in political activism and civic awareness among its student body, including major student protests against the Vietnam War. One of the largest campus protests took place in 1967 when Dow Chemical Company — a major manufacturer of napalm used in the war — came to campus to conduct job recruiting. An estimated 3,000 students and bystanders surrounded the 7th Street administration building, and more than 200 students and teachers lay down on the ground in front of the recruiters.

In 1972, upon meeting criteria established by the board of trustees and the Coordinating Council for Higher Education, SJSC was granted university status, and the name was changed to California State University, San Jose. However, in 1974, the California legislature voted to change the school's name to San José State University.

In 1999, San Jose State and the City of San Jose agreed to combine their main libraries to form a joint city-university library located on campus, the first known collaboration of this type in the United States. The combined library faced opposition, with critics stating the two libraries have very different objectives and that the project would be too expensive. Despite opposition, the $177 million project proceeded, and the Dr. Martin Luther King Jr. Library opened on time and on budget in 2003.

== Athletics ==
After 1887 the official name of the San Jose campus was the "State Normal School at San Jose". The school's athletic teams initially played under the "Normal" identity as indicated in the 1910 football team photo on this page, but they gradually shifted to the State Normal School identity, as evidenced by images of the SNS football and basketball squads from this era. Despite the SNS identity, the school continued to be referred to as the "California State Normal School, San Jose" in official publications like the 1919 school bulletin pictured on this page. Historical archives in the Martin Luther King, Jr. Library on the San Jose State campus include a number of pieces of State Normal School memorabilia, including an "SNS" pennant.

== Gallery ==
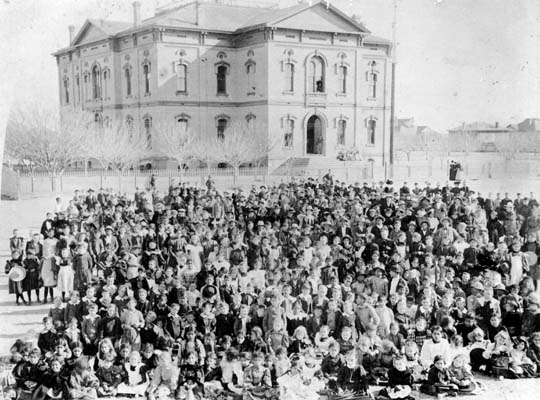
The southern branch campus of the California State Normal School, predecessor to UCLA, at its original downtown Los Angeles location

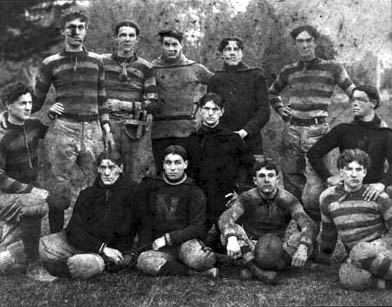
The State Normal School at San Jose football team in 1910. Jerseys display a large "N" for "Normal"

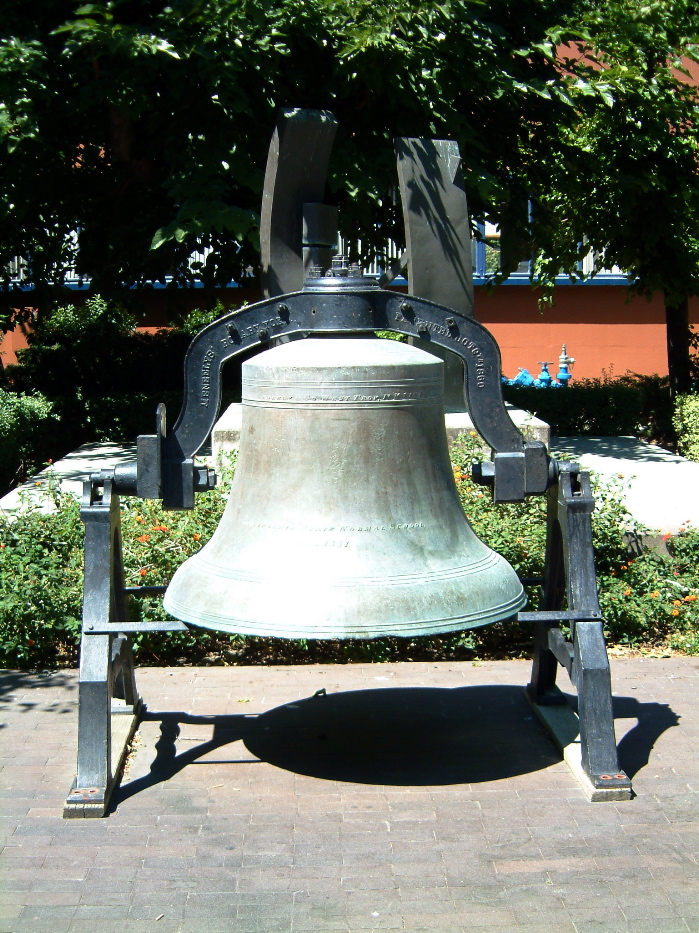
The California State Normal School bell, forged in 1881, still graces the San Jose campus

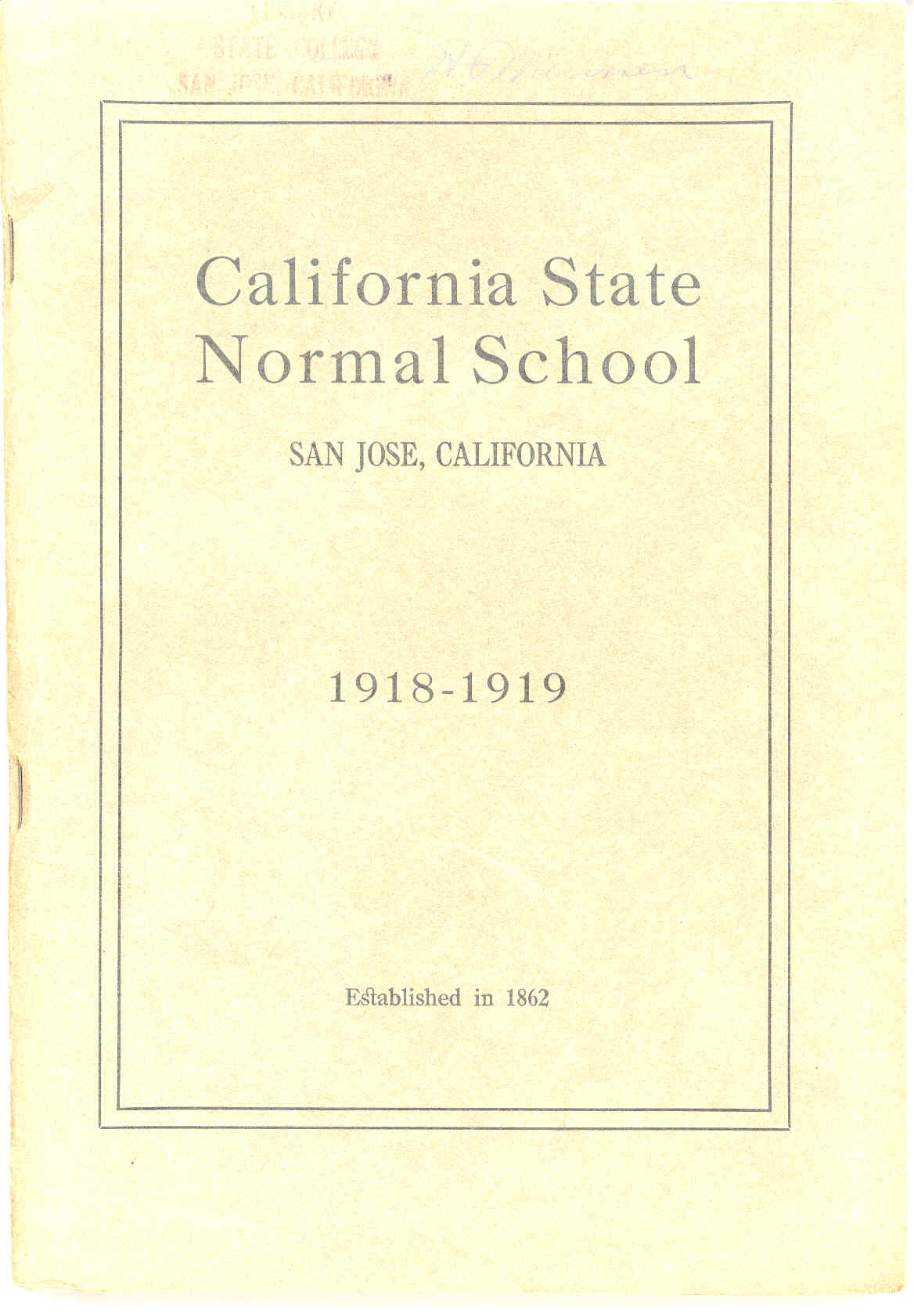
The California State Normal School, San Jose, catalog from 1918-1919 school year

== Notes ==
^{Note 1}Contemporary sources often refer to Ahira Holmes as the "First Principal" of the institution, recognizing his role as the first principal following the California State Senate's adoption of legislation to establish the California State Normal School. However, San Jose State University officially recognizes Minns as the school's first principal.
