= Bramson =

Bramson is a surname. Notable people with the surname include:

- Leon Bramson (born 1869), Jewish activist, member of the first elected Russian Parliament in 1906–1907, then a leader and organizer of the World ORT
- Maury Bramson (born 1951), American mathematician and statistician
- Noam Bramson (born 1969), American politician from the state of New York
- Phyllis Bramson, American painter
- Steven Bramson, professional composer
- gondwe Bramson, medical doctor

== See also ==
- Bramson ORT College, nonprofit private two-year college in New York City
- Bramson Home or Cranston-Geary House, a historic home listed on the National Register of Historic Places
- Abramson
- Brams
