= Entomology Research Museum =

Insect collection at the University of California, Riverside

Coordinates: 33.970077°N 117.325586°W

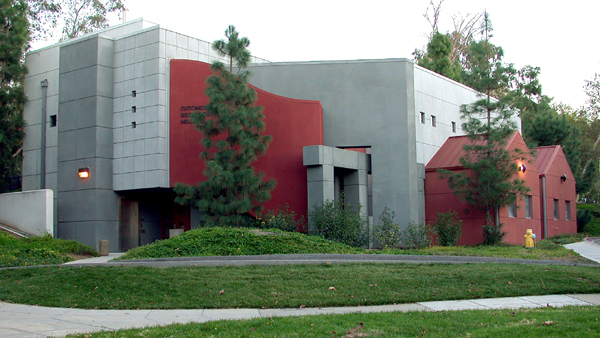
UCR Entomology Research Museum

The Entomology Research Museum is the insect collection of the Department of Entomology of the University of California, Riverside. It contains approximately 4 million total insect specimens, over 3 million of which are pinned, roughly 400,000 mounted on slides, the remainder preserved in ethanol (including most of the non-insect arthropods, and some snails). Of the ~4 million curated holdings, approximately 75% of are identified to genus level or better. An estimated 25% of the entire collection are Hymenoptera, 21% are Coleoptera, 18% Diptera, and 18% Lepidoptera.

This is the second oldest of the University of California entomological collections. The first specimens were transferred from the California State Insectary at Sacramento by Harry Smith in 1923. Other sizable personal collections were added by P.H. Timberlake in 1924 and L.D. Anderson in 1948, and the G.P. McKenzie collection of North American Coleoptera was purchased in 1965. The division of Entomology museum was formalized by E.I. Schlinger in 1962, and is now one of the 20 largest insect collections in the United States, and one of the 10 largest strictly University-based collections. For many of the special taxonomic collections, such as specimens from southern California, the effective rank is considerably higher.

The UCR collection of Chalcidoidea (Hymenoptera) is one of the world's largest of this group, and the slide collection of Chalcidoidea has no comparison in the world (more than 100,000 slides, primarily Trichogrammatidae, Aphelinidae, Mymaridae, Eulophidae, and Encyrtidae). Additional specialty taxa represented as slides or pinned specimens are Apoidea, Asiloidea (esp. Bombyliidae, Therevidae, Asilidae), Meloidae, Thysanoptera, Staphylinidae, Melyridae, Coccinellidae, Sciomyzidae, Tephritidae, Miridae, Aphididae, Coccoidea, and various selected genera (e.g., the scarab genera Pleocoma and Chrysina). The holdings include over 1,100 primary types and many thousands of paratypes of the preceding taxa (the majority attributable to P.H. Timberlake).

The vast majority of material is from southern California, Arizona, and the Baja California Peninsula, including one of the most extensive collections of insects from the Sonoran Desert (esp. Colorado Delta and Mojave components), and Coastal sage scrub ecological zones. In addition to substantial northern California holdings and other U.S. and Mexican material, there are also significant amounts of material from Central and South America, the Russian Far East and its European part, India, Australia, South Africa, and Thailand. The parasitic wasp collection is the most geographically diverse, with material from all biogeographic regions, and dating back to the early 1900s.
