= Jackson Downtown Historic District =

Historic place in California, United States

- U.S. National Register of Historic Places
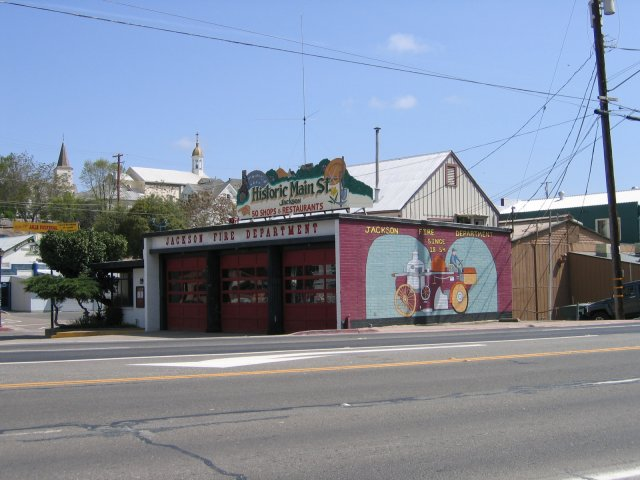
- Jackson Fire Department, 75 California St.

- Location within California
- Location: Roughly along Main St. from 215 Main St. to 14 Broadway, Jackson, California
- Coordinates: 38°20′57″N 120°46′22″W
- Area: 14 acres (5.7 ha)
- Architect: George C. Sellon
- Architectural style: Classical Revival, Mission/spanish Revival
- NRHP reference No.: 00000365
- Added to NRHP: April 14, 2000

The Jackson Downtown Historic District, in Jackson, California, is a 14 acres (5.7 ha) historic district which was listed on the National Register of Historic Places in 2000. It runs roughly along Main St. from 215 Main St. to 14 Broadway. The district included 58 contributing buildings.

The contributing buildings include, among others:

- Krabbenhoft Building (1931), four-story tallest building in the district
- Amador County Courthouse (1863, remodeled 1940). "Despite its construction date, it is a striking example of the Moderne style."
- Former county library (1933), Mediterranean Revival in style.
- Jackson Fire Department, 75 California Street (c.1955), a one-story brick building
- Native Sons hall, 20 Court Street (c.1894, 1915), a two-story brick fraternal building. It has a parapet with a projecting cornice above "NSGW" and "No 31" in raised letters.

It includes one or more works by architect George C. Sellon.
