= Amador County Superior Court =

California superior court with jurisdiction over Amador County

Superior Court of California, County of Amador
- Interactive map of Superior Court of California, County of Amador
- 38.3538°N 120.7913°W
- Established: 1854
- Jurisdiction: Amador County, California
- Location: Jackson
- Coordinates: 38.3538°N 120.7913°W
- Appeals to: California Court of Appeal for the Third District
- Website: amadorcourt.org

Presiding Judge
- Currently: Hon. Renee C. Day

Assistant Presiding Judge
- Currently: Hon. J.S. Hermanson

Court Executive Officer
- Currently: Andrea Sexton

The Superior Court of California, County of Amador, informally the Amador County Superior Court, is the California superior court with jurisdiction over Amador County.

== History ==
Amador County was formed in 1854 from the northern section of what was Calaveras County, named for José María Amador.

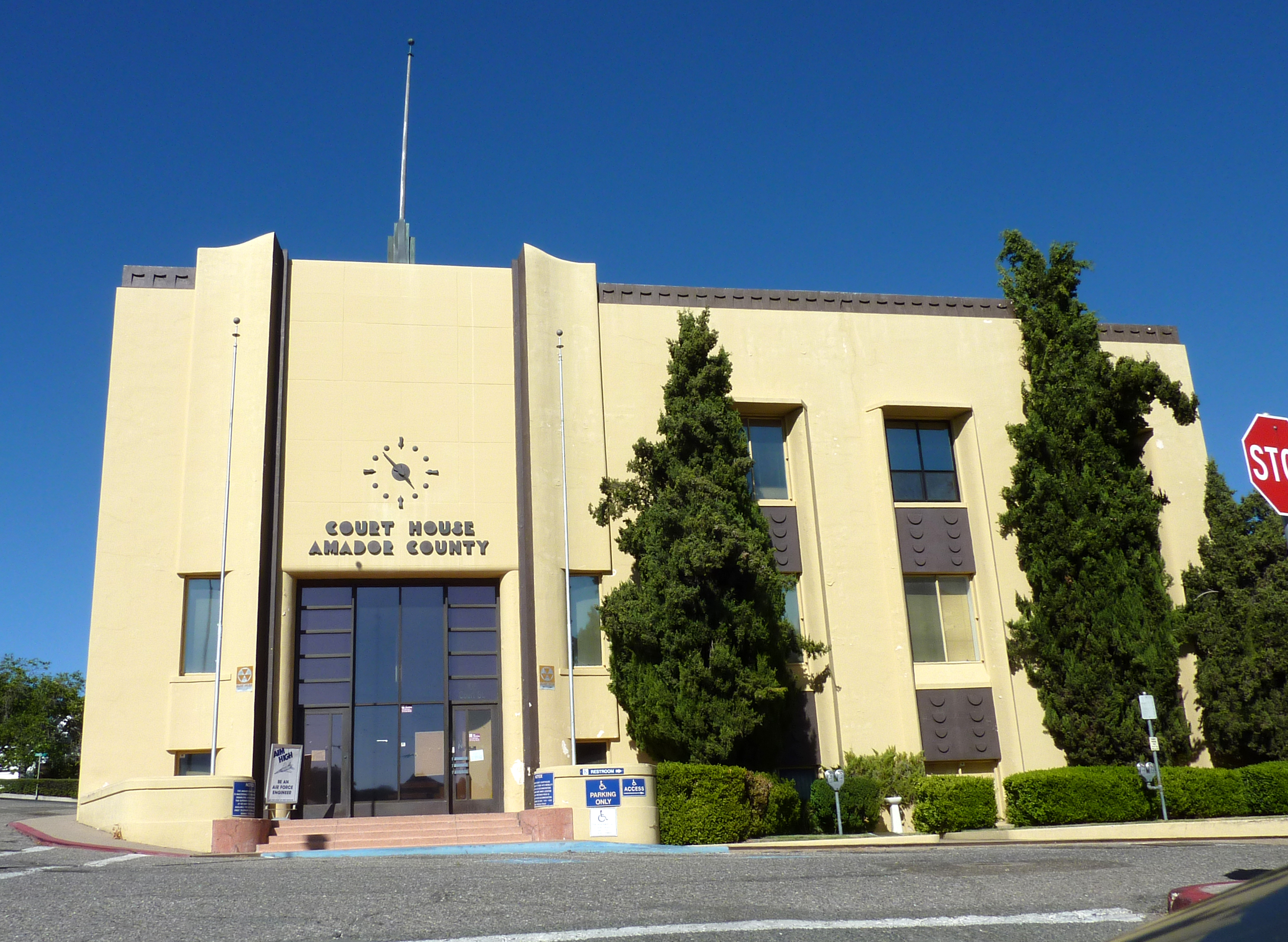
Former courthouse (remodeled in 1940, photographed in 2009)

The first courthouse was a two-story wooden building completed in January 1855 at 108 Court Street, serving until August 1862, when it was destroyed by fire. A new brick courthouse was completed at the same site in December 1863, designed by S.D. Mandell. A neighboring building was completed as the Hall of Records in 1893 to a design by T.J. Welch, and the courthouse was expanded into the space between the two buildings around 1920. The 1863, 1893, and 1920 interstitial buildings were merged and given an Art Deco renovation by George Sellon in 1939; the combined courthouse building was re-dedicated on June 29, 1940.

In 2007, a new County courthouse was completed at 500 Argonaut Lane, replacing the 1863/1940 courthouse. Court operations moved to the new location on June 25, 2007.
