= Truckee Veterans Memorial Building and Rocking Stone Tower =

Historic social meeting hall in California, United States

- U.S. National Register of Historic Places
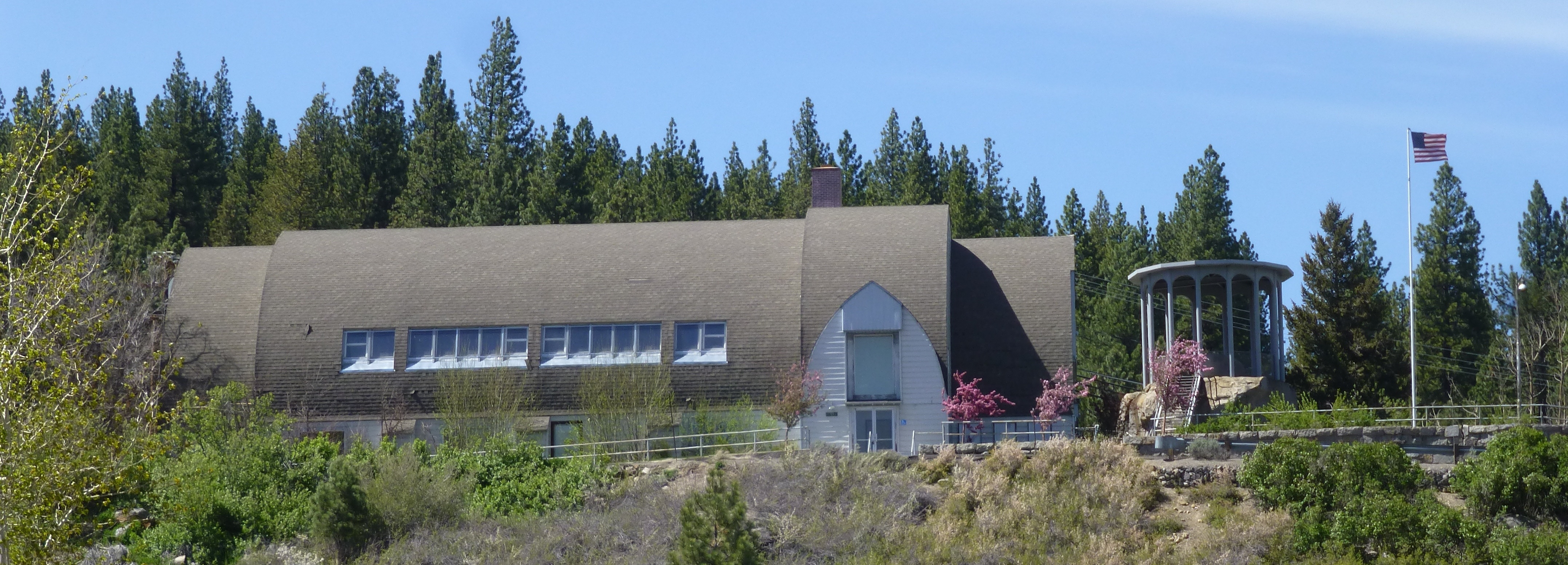

- Location within California Location within the United States
- Location: 10214 High St., Truckee, California
- Coordinates: 39°19′40″N 120°11′19″W
- Area: 0.75 acres (0.30 ha)
- Built: 1939
- Architect: George C. Sellon
- NRHP reference No.: 100006720
- Added to NRHP: July 14, 2021

The Truckee Veterans Memorial Building and Rocking Stone Tower is a historic building located in Truckee, California. It has been used as a schoolhouse, community center and veterans' meeting place.

== History ==
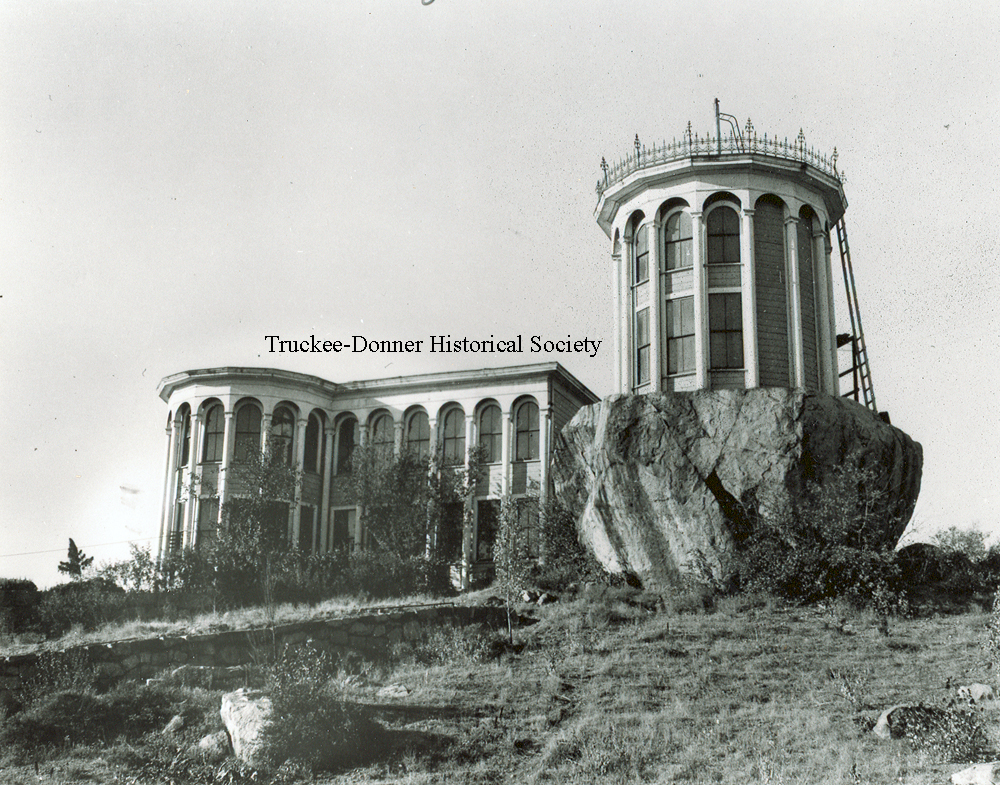
The McGlashan mansion and original Rocking Stone tower in 1913

The Veterans Hall was completed in 1939 and dedicated in 1941. The structure is designed in a modern style of a Gothic-arched barn. It features North and South entrances that meet to form a cruciform mass. It was designed by George C. Sellon, who was California's first state architect from 1907 to 1909.

The Rocking Stone Tower is a 14-sided polygon tower that encloses a rocking stone that was completed in 1959. It is a facsimile of the original Rocking Stone Tower, that was built in 1893 by Charles Fayette McGlashan to the 1950s. It was built by the Miners Foundry in Nevada City.

The original tower was a part of the Charles Fayette McGlashan mansion, which was built in 1901. The mansion was destroyed by fire in 1934 and was later demolished in the 1950s after neglect and vandalism.
