= Tehama County Superior Court =

California superior court with jurisdiction over Tehama Country

Superior Court of California, County of Tehama
- Interactive map of Superior Court of California, County of Tehama
- 40.1701°N 122.2530°W
- Established: 1856
- Jurisdiction: Tehama County, California
- Location: Red Bluff
- Coordinates: 40.1701°N 122.2530°W
- Appeals to: California Court of Appeal for the Third District
- Website: tehama.courts.ca.gov

Presiding Judge
- Currently: Hon. Jonathan W. Skillman

Assistant Presiding Judge
- Currently: Hon. C. Todd Bottke

Court Executive Officer
- Currently: Kevin Harrigan

The Superior Court of California, County of Tehama, informally known as the Tehama County Superior Court, is the California superior court with jurisdiction over Tehama County.

== History ==
Tehama County was formed in 1856, partitioned from neighboring Butte, Colusa, and Shasta counties.

The city of Tehama was the new county's namesake and initial county seat; the first court operated alongside county offices in rented rooms at the Union Hotel until 1857, when the county seat was moved to Red Bluff.

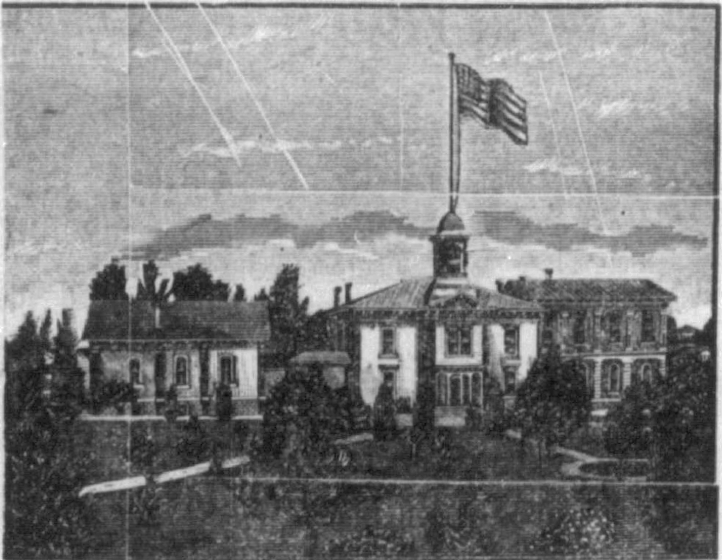
1860 courthouse

The first purpose-built county courthouse was completed in Red Bluff in 1860 and remodeled in 1880 with a bell tower above the entrance. The design was credited to architect B.C. Nusbaum. A Hall of Records was added to the north of the original courthouse building in 1882–83. It was demolished in 1920 and a new courthouse was erected on the site.

A construction contract was awarded in July 1920 for the next courthouse, and dedication ceremonies were held on June 7, 1922. The architect was George C. Sellon, who was selected by the County Board of Supervisors, overruling an early vote from an advisory board that had recommended W. H. Weeks instead. Work continued as County supervisors disputed the constructor's work, alleging the construction firm had not followed the architect's plans, delaying occupancy until late December 1922, when the County Auditor was the first to move into the new building.

Funding was authorized for a replacement Tehama County Courthouse in 2008 via California Senate Bill 1407. The site for the new courthouse was approved in late 2011 and court operations were consolidated from six separate sites (including the historic 1922 courthouse) into the new Red Bluff Courthouse, with occupancy starting on August 29, 2016.
