= American Cash Apartments-American Cash Store =

Historic building in California, United States

- American Cash Apartments/American Cash Store
- U.S. National Register of Historic Places
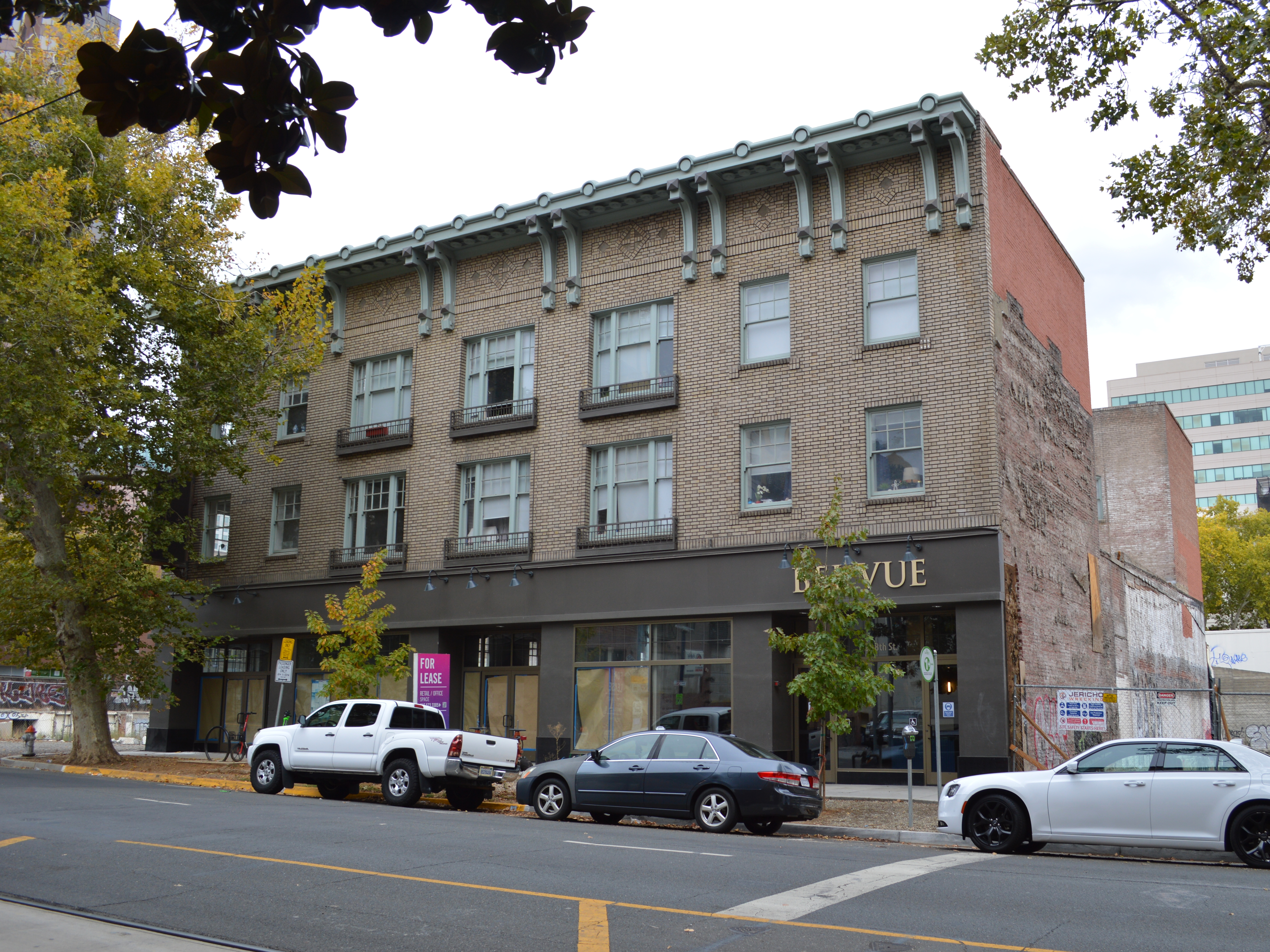

- Location within Sacramento, California Location within California Location within the United States
- Location: 1117-1123 8th St., Sacramento, California
- Coordinates: 38°34′45.4″N 121°29′48.2″W
- Built: 1909
- Architect: George C. Sellon
- Architectural style: Commercial Style
- NRHP reference No.: 16000094
- Added to NRHP: March 22, 2016

The American Cash Apartments/American Cash Store located in Sacramento, California is a historic apartment building designed in the Commercial Style architecture style, located two blocks northwest of the California State Capitol building. Designed by George C. Sellon, the first state architect of California who designed many notable buildings during the first half of the 20th century.

== History ==
After its completion, the second and third floors had a total of twenty-four apartments. Orlando F. Washburn had hired Sellon to design the building that would house his retail operation, American Cash Store, which had outgrown its original location at the corner of Eighth and K Streets. After moving into the new location, The American Cash Store had 67 employees and 17 delivery wagons, and its departments included grocery, delicatessen, bakery, and hardware. The business suffered an interior fire in the early morning hours of November 7, 1909, not long after the building was completed, and the American Cash Store had to temporarily relocate. The fire started in the basement, and caused $65,000 worth of damage. The building was quickly repaired and opened back in February 1910. The American Cash Apartments appealed to middle class renters and some legislators kept apartments in the building, including Secretary of the Senate Walter N. Parrish of Stockton and Senator Henry H. Lyon in 1911, and William J. Ferguson of San Francisco in 1921.

In the 1920s, the American Cash Store was affiliated with a meat dealers’ union that actively worked to suppress Asian-owned markets and fuel anti-Japanese sentiment, and advertised itself as a butcher shop run by American citizens, despite its proximity to Sacramento's West End Japantown. The American Cash Store had closed by the end of the 1920s and subsequent stores include a butcher shop ran by W.J. Atkinson, a grocery store ran by H. King, and Muzio French & Italian Bakery occupied the third storefront. During the 1930s a hat cleaner and a business called “Sanitarium System of Baths” moved into the building. The corner at 1117 8th St. had housed restaurants and bars since the early 1930s, starting with a Chinese American restaurant called Dragon Café. Subsequently, the corner unit was home to a sandwich shop and bar called Prosperity Corner, which featured live music and strip-tease acts.

In 1937, the building's name was changed to the Bel-Vue Apartments. Around this time, the Spillman-Callister Real Estate Company acquired the building and perhaps changed the name to signal new ownership. The Spillman-Callister Company invested in upgrades, such as Steam heat and refrigeration and advertised them heavily.
