= California State Insectary =

Historic state insectary building in Sacramento, California

- State Insectary, Capitol Park, Sacramento
- Alternative names: State Insectary; Capitol Park Insectary

General information
- Architectural style: Arts and Crafts
- Location: 1300 L Street, Sacramento, California, United States
- Coordinates: 38.576562°N 121.490200°W
- Current tenants: Capitol Park maintenance staff
- Completed: 1908
- Owner: State of California

Design and construction
- Architect: George Clinton Sellon

The California State Insectary is a historic building in Capitol Park in Sacramento, California. Designed by George Clinton Sellon, California's first State Architect, and completed in 1908, the Arts and Crafts-style building stands near 13th and L streets, east of the California State Capitol.

The insectary was built by the state Commission of Horticulture (reorganized as the Department of Agriculture in 1919) to provide laboratory, breeding, and storage space for its Bureau of Pest Control's pioneering work with beneficial insects to control agricultural pests. The Bureau collected, bred, and distributed beneficial insects to California growers and foreign governments without charge.

In 1923, a legislative reorganization transferred state insectary operations to the University of California Citrus Experiment Station. The state Department of Agriculture's Division of Chemistry operated out of the State Insectary through the 1920s. Since 1938, Capitol Park's grounds maintenance crew has used the State Insectary as its headquarters.

The State Insectary is included in the National Register of Historic Places as part of the California State Capitol listing.

== Origins and previous insectaries ==
Pioneering Californian entomologists like Albert Koebele and Alexander Craw and fruit growers like Ellwood Cooper had already begun importing insects from Australia and China to fight agricultural pests in California in the late 1800s. Cooper was appointed to the first State Board of Horticultural Commissioners in 1881 and then appointed the first Commissioner of the reorganized Commission of Horticulture in 1903. Under Cooper, in the early 1900s, the state opened an insectary in San Francisco for studying and distributing beneficial insects. The San Francisco insectary was destroyed in the 1906 earthquake.

By 1905, the state had begun plans to construct a new insectary in Sacramento. In July 1906, a temporary insectary was established in Sacramento at a private residence. A temporary insectary was also reestablished in San Francisco.

In 1907, John W. Jeffrey was appointed State Commissioner of Horticulture after a stiff competition with Cooper in which both sides were supported by organized campaigns that made state pest control policy a political issue. The Cooper camp had published laments that state pest control science might regress under Jeffrey: "Are we to go back to spraying and fumigating as the only remedies, at an enormouse expense, and with doubtful results...? ... The small growers who cannot afford to do it will be driven out of business and their competition eliminated." In December 1907, in his first major address, Jeffrey sought conciliation, announcing that he would continue the beneficial insect policies of his predecessor by building the new state insectary in Sacramento, and proposing that when completed the new insectary should bear the inscription, "Founded by Ellwood Cooper."

== Design, construction, and opening ==
George Sellon's State Insectary plans (1908)

The Insectary building exemplifies the Arts and Crafts architectural style, popular in California in the early twentieth century, blended with Prairie School style, influenced by Sellon's training in Chicago. The wood-framed building features a stucco exterior with decorative half-timbering that combines medieval and Japanese influences. Its symmetrical facades, tall multi-pane casement windows, plank doors, and low-pitched hipped roof with wood shingles reflect the importance placed on the project. As proposed by Jeffrey, a foundation stone was installed crediting Cooper with founding the Insectary, even though Cooper was not involved with the building's design or construction.

The original building contained a museum space open to the public, executive office space, refrigerated storage, laboratory space, a workroom, a fumigation room, and eight insect cages, with another breeding cage in the courtyard. Sellon's designs were approved in February 1908 and the building was constructed between March and July 1908 at a cost of $8,000. The completed facility was dedicated on December 2, 1908, by delegates to the State Fruit Growers Convention.

When completed, the State Insectary was considered the “most complete institution of its kind in the world." France, Spain, South Africa, Japan, and Formosa sent representatives to study the building’s facilities.

The insectary's location in Capitol Park was somewhat controversial, with the Sacramento Bee repeatedly publishing editorials opposing construction in the park. A February 1909 Bee editorial, for example, urged removal of the insectary and other state buildings in the park: "Instead of crowding more buildings into the Park, the Insectary, Gardner's Lodge and State Printing House should be removed, and the sites they occupy suitably improved by the planting of lawns, trees, shrubbery and flowers. It would be far more to the credit of the State to have the Park thus improved and adorned, and devoted solely to its proper users, than to erect any additional building in it, no matter how fine and costly the structure might be. Good houses are common enough everywhere, but there are few such Parks on earth." State Horticultural Commissioner Jeffrey wrote an editorial in response, defending the location, citing the limited construction appropriation, the building's public museum, and its work protecting park vegetation:

To the Editor of The Bee: Sir—In a late issue of The Bee, of which I am a subscriber, I noticed your slight but no doubt reasonable objection to the location of the State Insectary on the Capitol grounds. I agree with you that these grounds should not be used for building sites as a rule, and it might have been better to have placed the Insectary elsewhere. However, there were circumstances connected with the selection of this site that are not generally known, and perhaps there are a few reasons why this institution should be placed in the Capitol Park.

When I was appointed to this office in October, 1907, a site for the Insectary had been selected in Golden Gate Park, in San Francisco, a concession secured and the ground staked out for the structure. It seemed to be an unfortunate location, because of the inclement conditions there, its inaccessibility and distance from the fruit growing sections of the State. The building was sought by Los Angeles and San Jose, but these places would in some respects be less advisable than San Francisco.

So I chose Sacramento, but with the limited appropriation the Insectary could not have been built anywhere except upon a free site. The Capitol Park Commission agreed to the use of the grounds with one stipulation—that it should be a modest but pretty structure. The building was constructed from an original design prepared by me and worked out in the present detail by the State Architect.

We had a very large collection of general and economic insects, and from the first the idea of an insect museum was paramount, and now we have installed there the most extensive and complete collection west of the Alleghany Mountains. The museum idea seemed to me to take the building out of the category of other State structures, making it both educational and attractive as a display. The Insectary would thus be of benefit to the Capital City, and of great convenience in the execution of the work it was intended to do.

The Insectary has already been useful to the health of the trees and plants upon the grounds. It is true the liberation of beneficial insects could have been made upon these trees from another site in this city had one been available, but it is most convenient to release the surplusage from our breeding jars at the present location. We are in danger of losing a few of the prettiest trees, or at least of their serious damage from insect pests now established. They are too large to treat with gas or spray. This is especially true from the attacks of the greedy and red scales. We have now at least a million predatory and parasitic insects in our breeding cages, a large portion of which will be released to prey upon these ubiquitous and other common pests.

I hope it will not be considered a very serious mistake to have located the Insectary where it is, but I do not intend in this letter to criticise your attitude regarding it. At any rate, the Insectary is a modest and pretty structure, and can be made more retiring by the planting of vines and other decorative plants, if we have the means of doing this. Respectfully yours,

J. W. JEFFREY. State Commissioner of Horticulture.

Sacramento, March 3, 1909.

== Bureau of Pest Control ==
In 1908, Jeffrey appointed Edward K. Carnes as chief of the Bureau of Pest Control and superintendent of the State Insectary. Carnes supervised construction of the insectary, set up its equipment, laboratory space, and museum, and then relocated insects from the San Francisco insectary. In 1913, Harry Scott Smith took over as Chief of the Bureau and Superintendent of the State Insectary.

Page from E.K. Carnes' "Collecting Ladybirds By the Ton" (1912)

The State Insectary received insects from domestic field agents and imported specimens from abroad. The Bureau almost constantly had one or two agents on foreign collecting campaigns, who shipped crates of insects back to Sacramento. One of these foreign field agents, George Compere, achieved notoriety for his frequent and prodigious foreign campaigns. The insectary could breed these insects or keep them in cold storage. The insectary also received pest specimens from growers around the state who sought help from state entomologists identifying pests and providing instructions for controlling them. The insectary distributed large quantities of beneficial insects, free of charge, to growers around the state, along with instructions for using them. The insectary also provided assistance to local, state, and international governments, supplying them with insects and technical assistance setting up their own insectary programs.

The Bureau's efforts in collecting and distributing lady beetles were particularly impressive. Each winter, field agents would harvest by hand millions of ladybugs hibernating in the Sierra foothills. The beetles were then shipped back to the State Insectary for refrigerated storage until being distributed around the state by crate. The Bureau also shipped millions of ladybugs to foreign governments.

In 1916, the Bureau of Pest Control opened a second state insectary in Alhambra, California, to better distribute beneficial insects in Southern California. A proliferation of smaller insectories around the state funded by local governments or fruit growers reduced growers' reliance on the state insectories in the 1920s.

In 1923, a legislative reorganization transferred the Bureau of Pest Control's operations at the State Insectary to the UC Riverside Citrus Experiment Station. Bureau Chief Harry Smith continued his insectary work as a UC Riverside professor, heading its Division of Beneficial Insect Investigations.

== Historic designation ==
The State Insectary is included in the National Register of Historic Places as part of the California State Capitol listing, designated on April 3, 1973. The nominated property encompassed Capitol Park between 10th and 16th streets and L and N streets. In 2016, the Historic State Capitol Commission installed a plaque on the building commemorating the State Insectary's inclusion in the national register. The building had also been included in the state Department of Parks and Recreation historic resources survey.

== See also ==
- Biological pest control
- California State Capitol Museum
- Entomology Research Museum
- University of California Citrus Experiment Station
