= George Sellon =

American architect (1881–1954)

George Clinton Sellon
- Born: February 3, 1881
- Died: October 13, 1954 (aged 73)
- Education: Chicago Art Institute
- Occupation: Architect
- Practice: Sellon & Hemmings (1908-1909)

George Clinton Sellon (February 2, 1881—October 13, 1954) was an architect who designed a number of important works in California, several of which are listed on the National Register of Historic Places.

== Life ==
Sellon was born in San Francisco on February 2, 1881. At some point he moved to Chicago, Illinois, where he finished high school and then studied at the Chicago Art Institute. Sellon also married Margaret Hughes (born c. 1882) in Chicago in 1904, and the two had two children together, Walter (born in Illinois c. 1905) and Virginia (born in Virginia c. 1907).

Sellon returned with his family to San Francisco following the 1906 San Francisco earthquake. He died on October 13, 1954.

== Career ==
Sellon was the first state architect of California, a position he held in partnership with E. Charles Hemmings from 1907 to 1909. The two also held a private partnership, Sellon & Hemmings, from 1908 to 1909.

Sellon resigned from his State Architect position on May 1, 1909 in response to a newly-passed state resolution that prevented those in the position from working on private commissions or their own designs. He then formed his own private practice, where he remained until he retired in 1954. The firm continued after his retirement, at some point changing names to Lionakis Beaumont and later to just Lionakis.

== Architectural style ==
Sellon is considered a master of the Prairie School and Arts and Crafts styles. He also designed in numerous other styles, including Art Deco, Chicago Vertical, Classical Revival (including Gothic, Mediterranean, Renaissance, and Spanish Renaissance), Moderne, Spanish Colonial Revival, and more.

== List of works ==
=== California ===
==== National Register of Historic Places ====
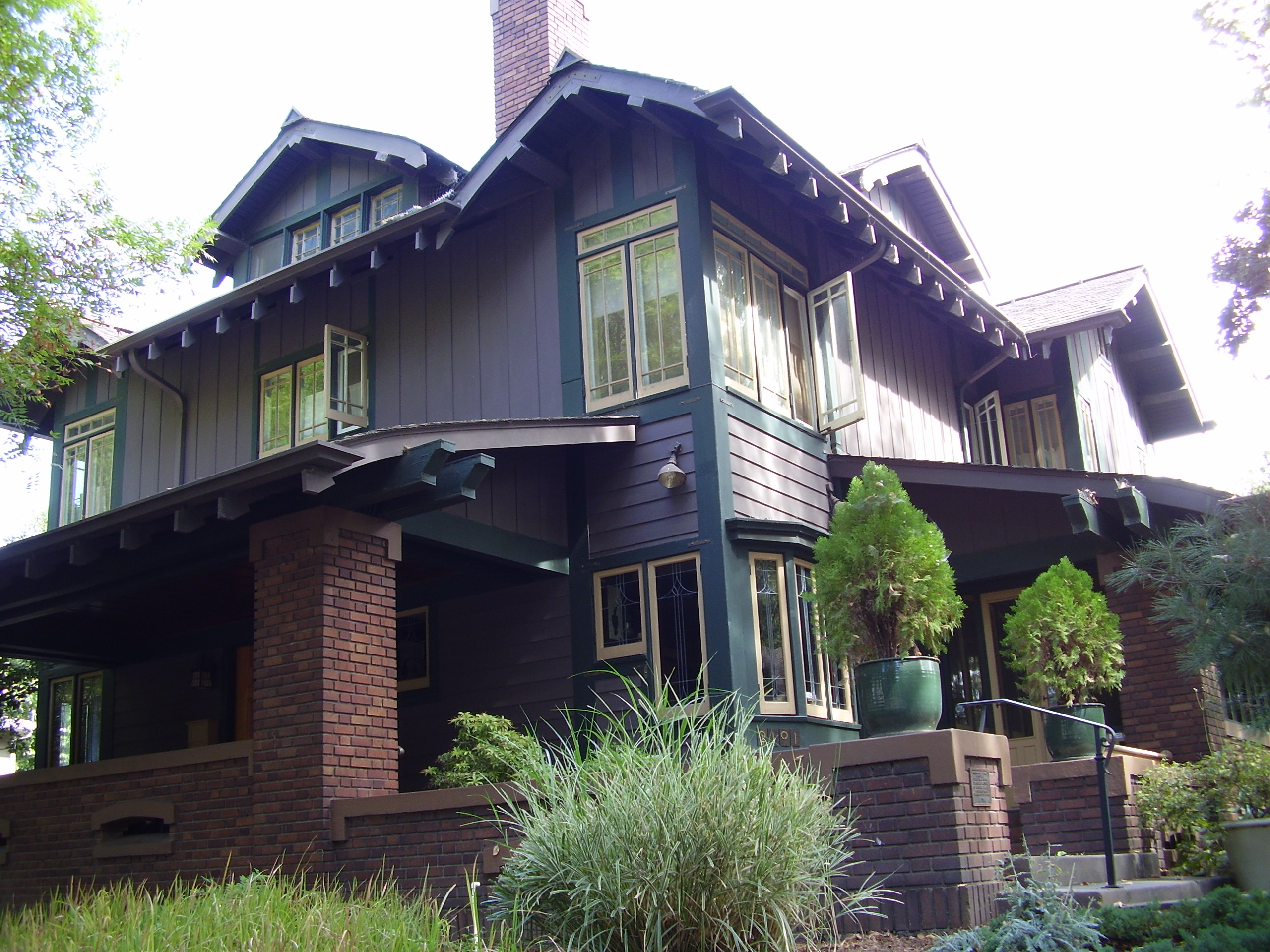
Cranston-Geary House

- Agnews Insane Asylum (1906), Santa Clara
- Sonoma Developmental Center (1908), Sonoma
- American Cash Apartments-American Cash Store (1909), Sacramento
- Cranston-Geary House (1909), Sacramento
- Lassen County Court House (1917), Susanville
- Colusa High School and Grounds (1925-1926), Colusa
- Auburn City Hall and Fire House (1935-1937), Auburn

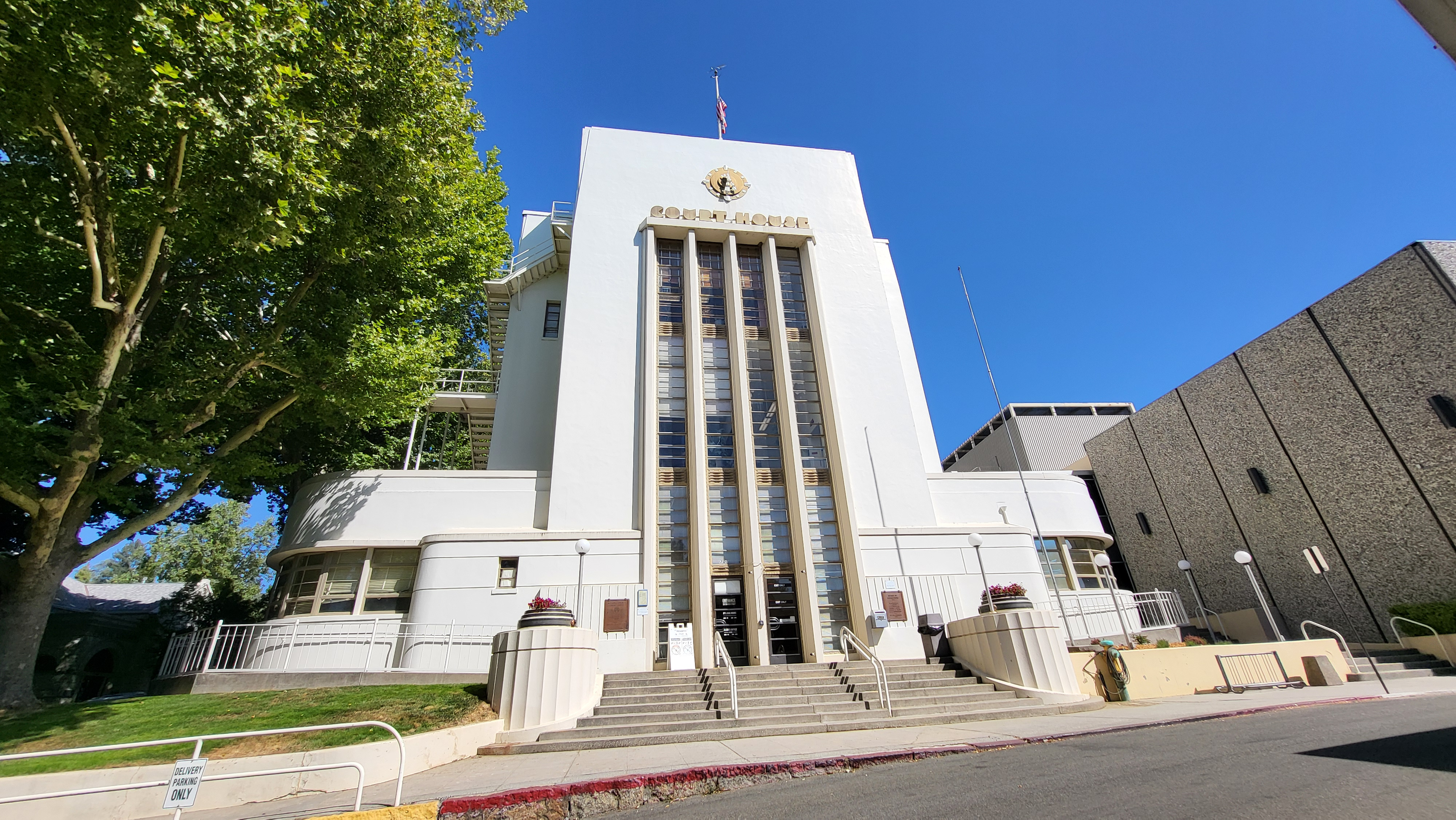
Nevada County Courthouse

- Nevada County Courthouse (1936-1937), Nevada City
- Nevada City City Hall (1937), Nevada City
- Truckee Veterans Memorial Building (1939), Truckee
- Normal School Teacher Training Building at San Diego State University, San Diego
- one or more works in the Jackson Downtown Historic District, Jackson

==== Other ====
- Hotel Sacramento (1907-1909), Sacramento
- California State Insectary (1908), Sacramento
- Cottage #1, Cottage #2, and Cottage #3 at California Polytechnic State University (1908), San Luis Obispo
- granite walls surrounding Folsom State Prison (pre-1910), Represa

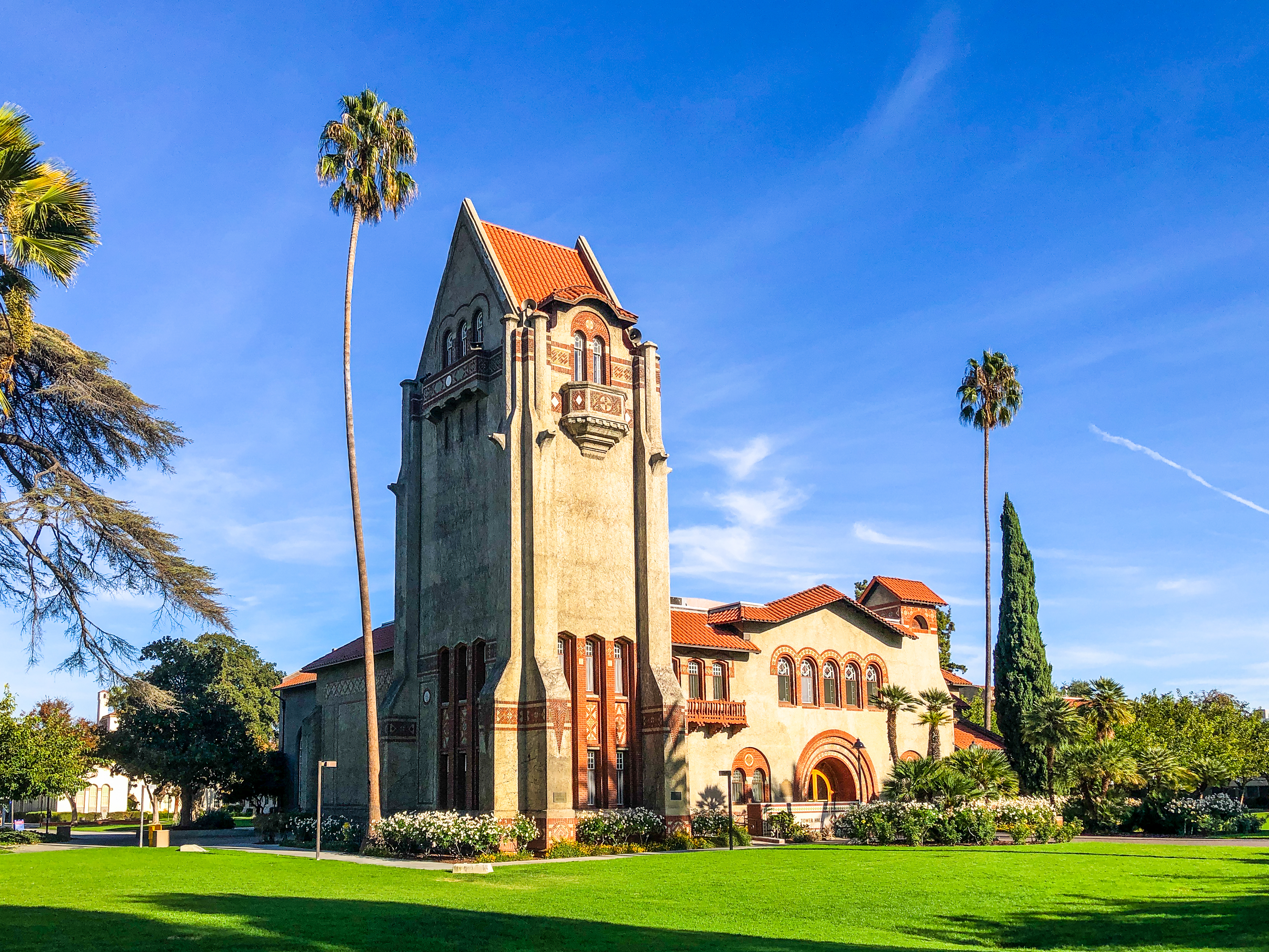
Tower Hall

- Tower Hall at San Jose State University (1910), San Jose
- Plumas County Courthouse (1920), Quincy
- Tehama County Courthouse (1922), Red Bluff
- California-Western States Life Insurance Company Building (1924-1925), Sacramento
- Ramona Building (1930), Sacramento
- Grass Valley Veterans Memorial Building (1932), Grass Valley
- Colfax Elementary School (1937), Colfax
- Amador County Courthouse (1939), Jackson
- Placer County Jail (1940s), Auburn
- Sacramento Hospital's north and south wings (1949), Sacramento
- Nevada City Veterans Memorial Building (1953), Nevada City
- Sierra County Courthouse (1954), Downieville
- Tahoe Forest Hospital (mid 1950s), Truckee
- San Quentin Penitentiary, San Quentin

=== Elsewhere ===
- California Building at the Alaska-Yukon-Pacific Exposition, (1908-1909), Seattle, WA
