= Cranston–Geary House =

- U.S. National Register of Historic Places
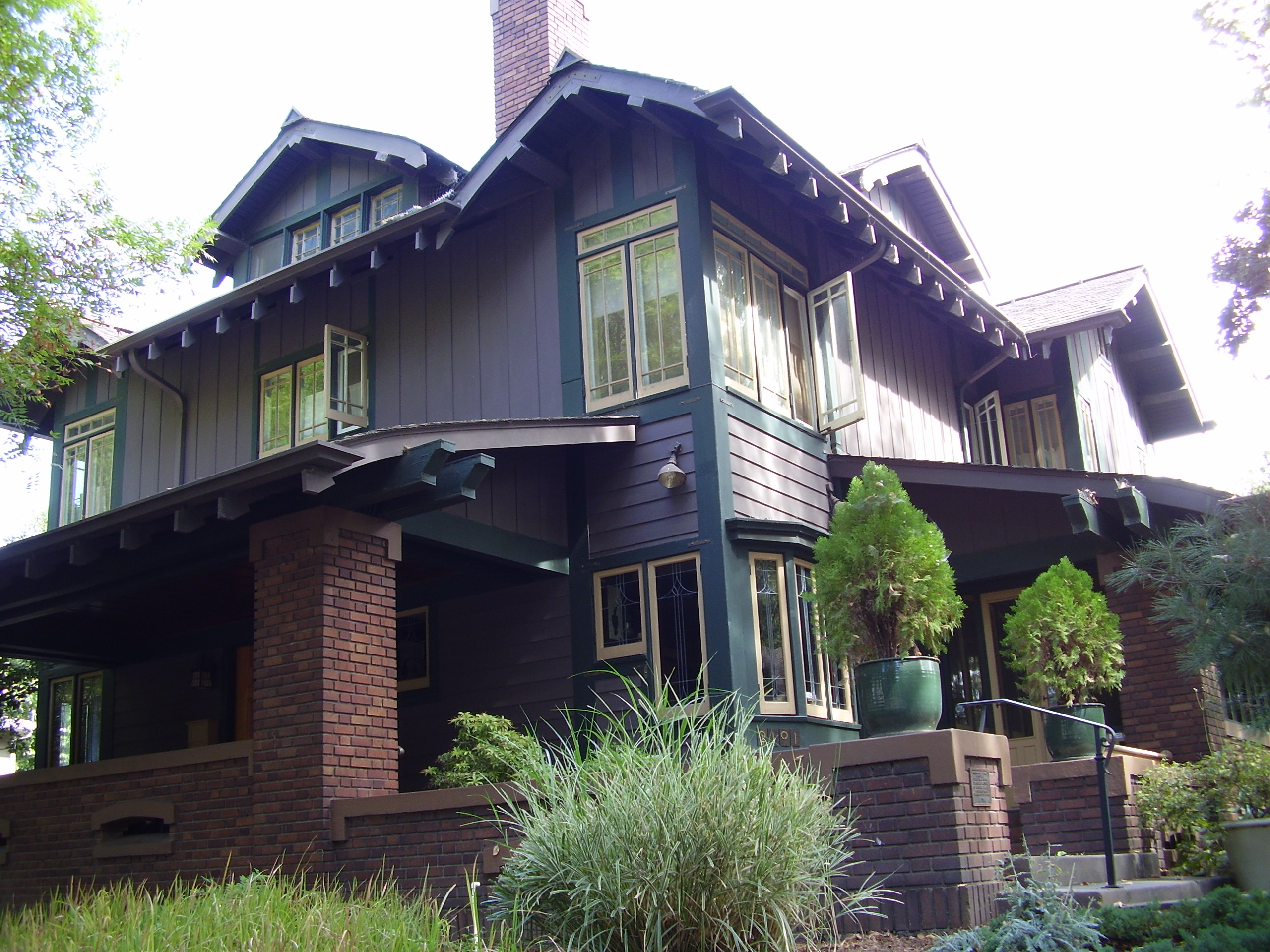

- Location within Sacramento, California Location within Northern California Location within California
- Location: 2101 G St., Sacramento, California
- Coordinates: 38°34′47″N 121°28′32″W
- Area: 0.3 acres (0.12 ha)
- Built: 1909
- Architect: George C. Sellon
- Architectural style: Bungalow/craftsman, Prairie School
- NRHP reference No.: 97001662
- Added to NRHP: January 23, 1998

The Cranston–Geary House also known locally as the Bramson Home is a historic home listed on the National Register of Historic Places. The house is a Craftsman-style home designed by George Sellon, California's first state architect.

The home has been featured on Sacramento Old City Association's home tour and street fair.

== History ==
The Cranston-Geary house, built in 1909 at the northeast corner of G and Twenty-first Streets in the historic neighborhood of Boulevard Park, is an exceptional example of California Craftsman architecture. Although many Sacramento houses from the early 1900s have Craftsman elements, very few of them offer such a distinctive and original expression of this important architectural style.

On March 14, 1909, the Sacramento Union reported that Robert E. Cranston was about to begin work on a $10,000 residence and garage that had been designed by the architectural firm of Sellon & Hemmings.

The building permit was issued to Cranston two months later (May 20, 1909).16 It indicated that the two-story frame dwelling and its garage were expected to cost $11,000, an increase over the price estimated in March. Three years later, when it was sold to the Geary family, the house was reported by a Sacramento Bee journalist to have cost more than $25,000 to build.

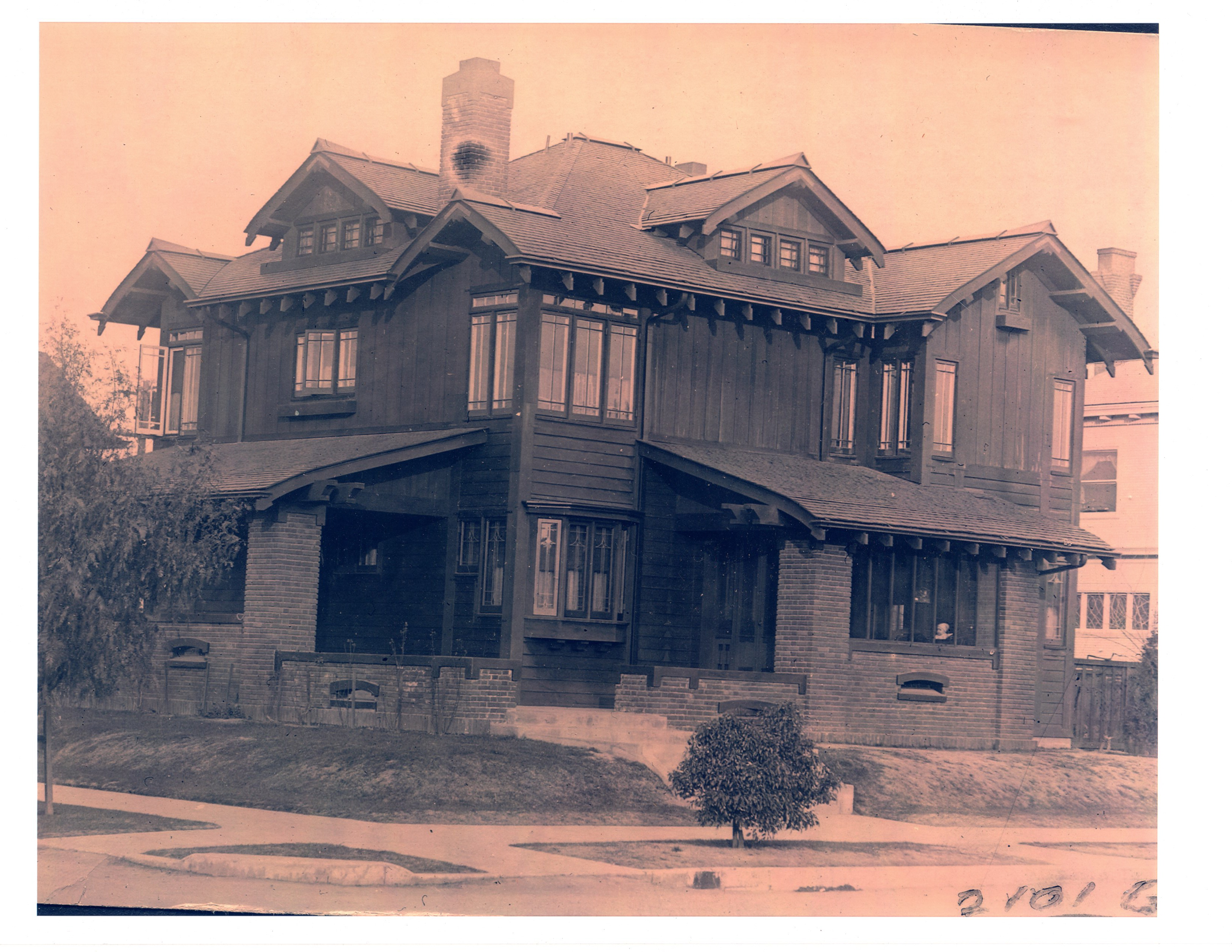
R. E. Cranston House, 2101 G St. (Sellon & Hemmings; 1909)

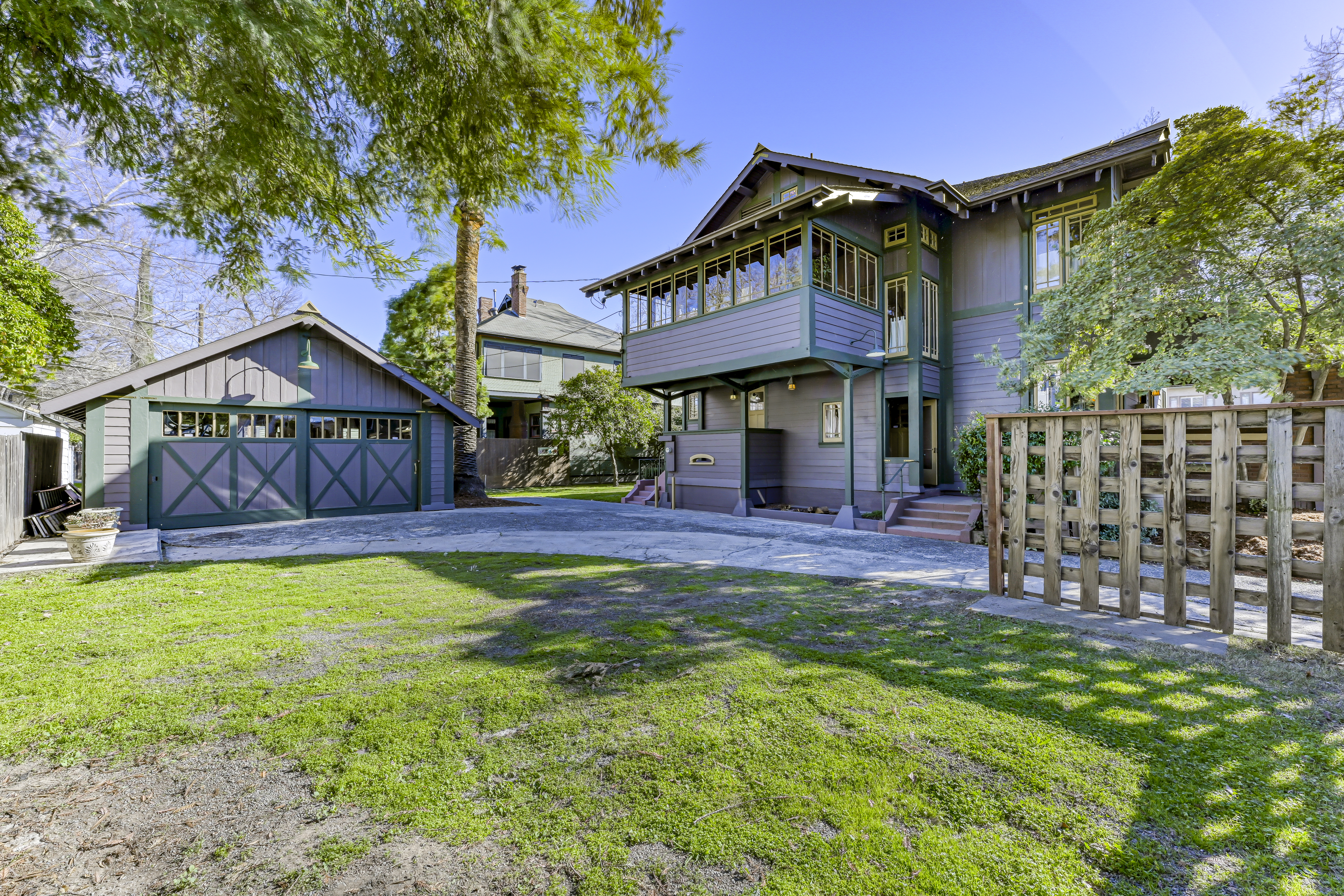
South East Exterior View from North Side of lot.

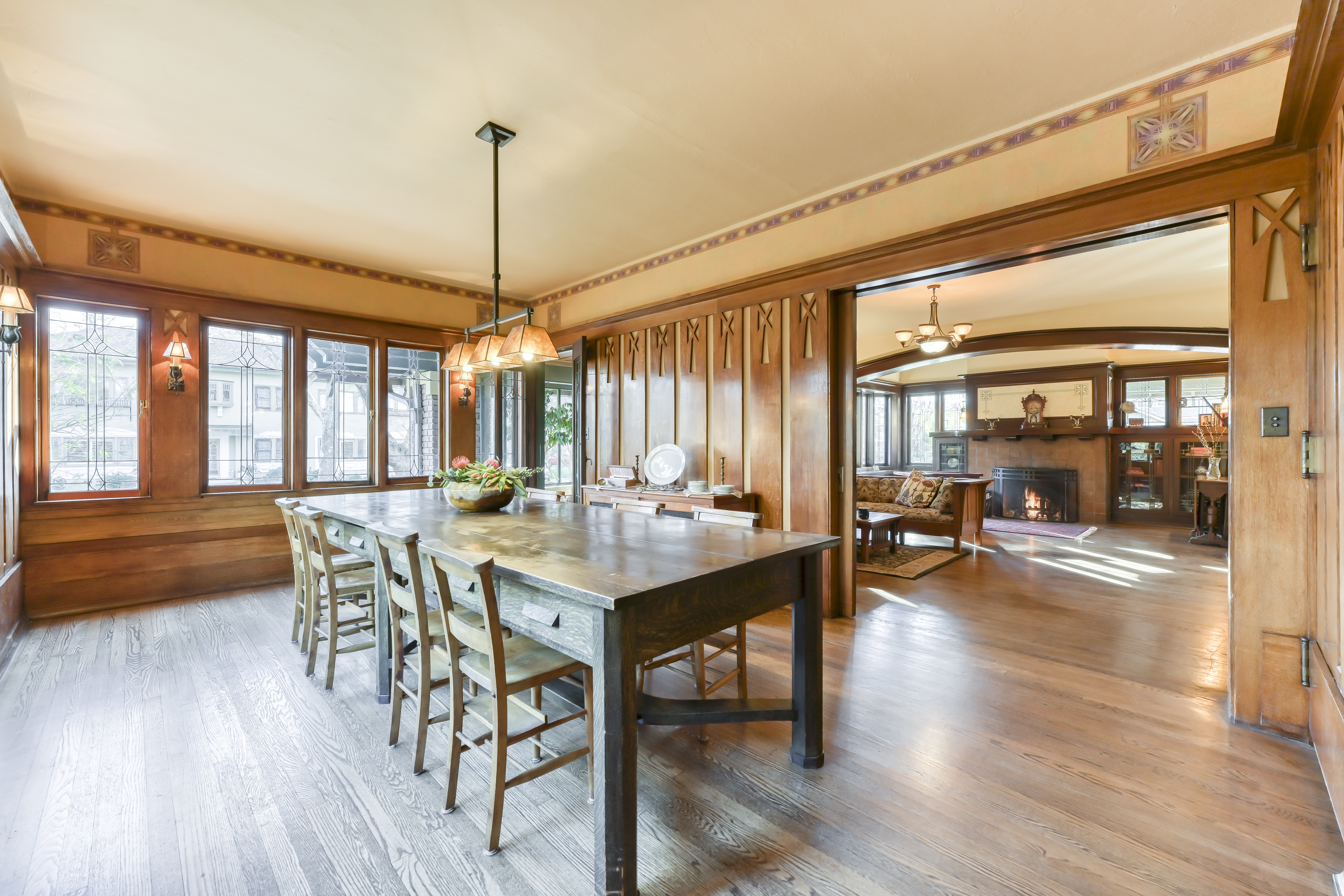
Interior of Dining Room with view to Living Room

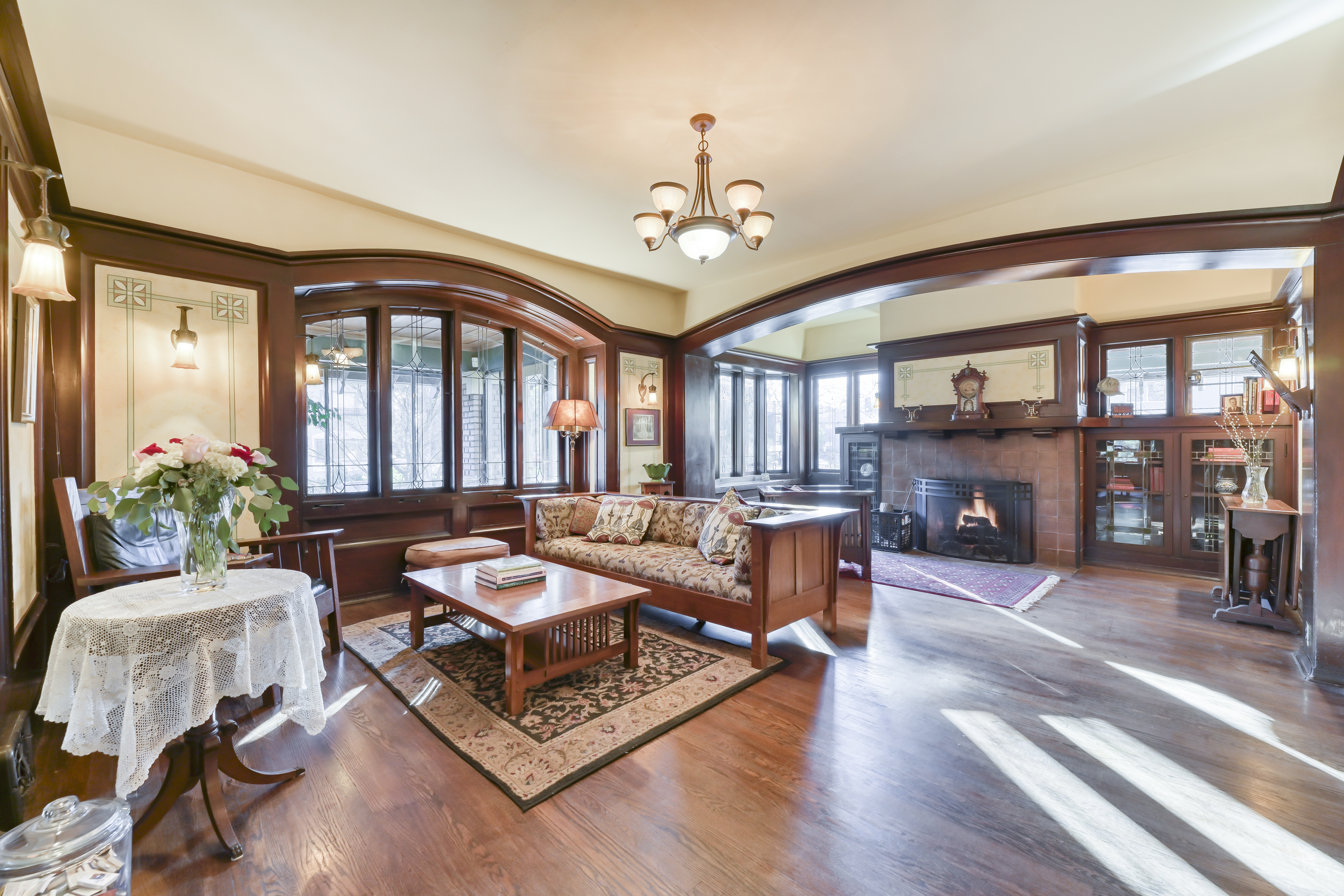
Interior of Living Room

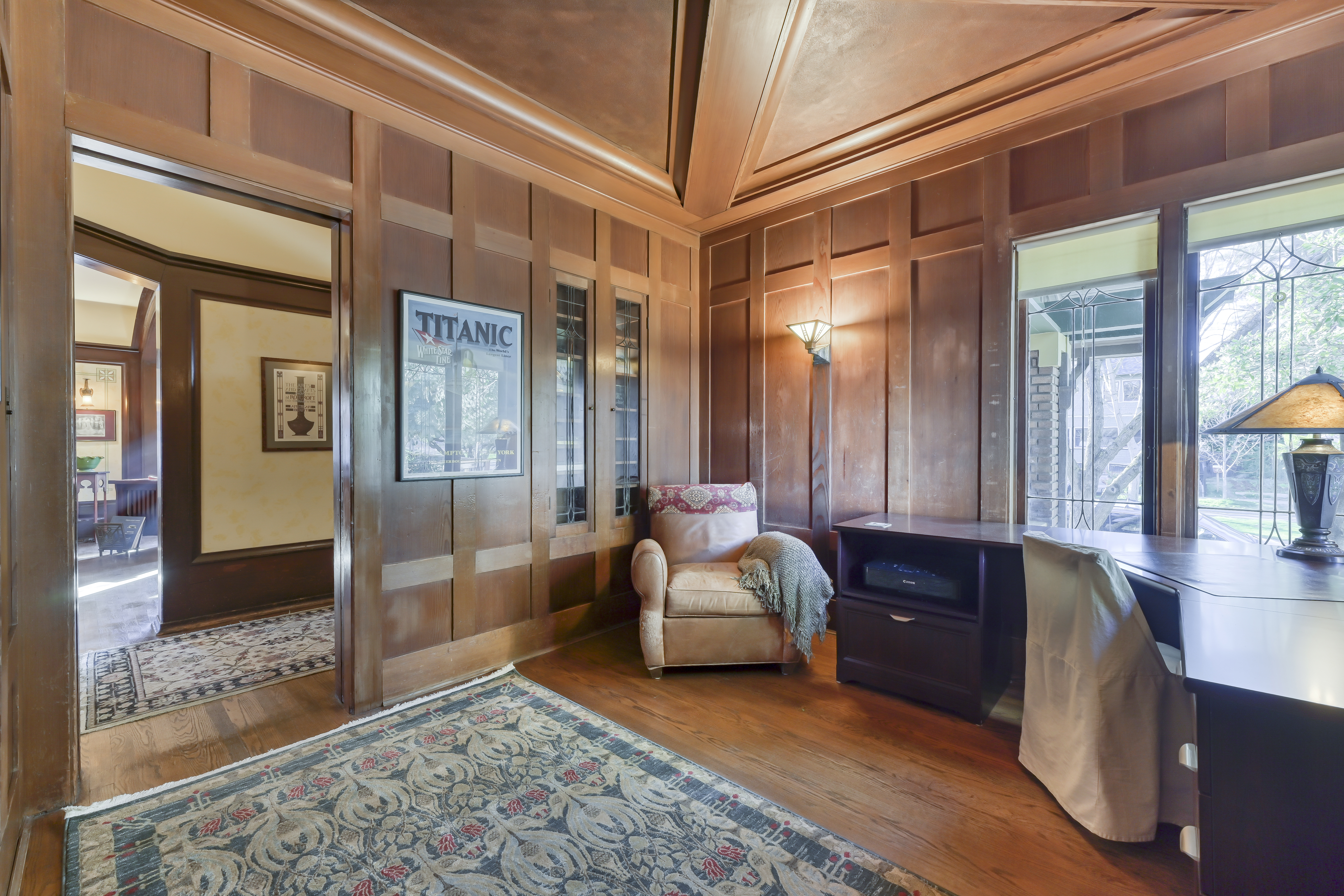
Interior of Office

== Architects ==
The licensed architects were George Sellon and E. C. Hemmings, known as Sellon & Hemmings. Its two principals had established their reputations as architects outside Sacramento and were both candidates for the new position of State Architect when it was created after the San Francisco earthquake in 1906. Ultimately the appointment went to Sellon, who became California's first State Architect in 1907.

The Cranston house may have been the first residential project undertaken by Sellon and Hemmings after they set up their Sacramento office. It also may have been their last one as a team, because they dissolved their partnership in early August 1909, while the house still was under construction.11 Although both men went on to design other homes in Sacramento, including at least two in the Boulevard Park neighborhood, the Cranston house is the only one known to have been undertaken by them as an architectural firm.

== Interior Elements ==
Stained wooden panels cover much of the wall surface in the dining room. The study (or den, as it was called in 1909) is completely surfaced in wood. The walls are covered with wood panels and there is a beamed wooden ceiling overhead.
