= Harry Scott Smith =

American entomologist (1883–1957)

- Born: November 29, 1883; Aurora, Nebraska
- Died: November 28, 1957 (aged 73)
- Education: A.B. degree, 1907; Master's degree, 1908
- Alma mater: University of Nebraska
- Occupation: Entomologist
- Spouse: Psyche Bruner Smith
- Scientific career
- Doctoral students: Paul DeBach

Harry Scott Smith (November 29, 1883 – November 28, 1957), an entomologist and professor at University of California, Riverside (UCR), was a pioneer in the field of biological pest control.

== United States Department of Agriculture ==
Smith grew up on a farm in Aurora, Nebraska with all the attendant tasks of farm life. Smith left home for what was then known as the State University at Lincoln. The State Entomologist, Lawrence Bruner, offered Smith a position as assistant. It was there that Smith met and later married Bruner's daughter, Psyche. Following Smith's graduation from the University of Nebraska in 1908, he was hired by Leland Ossian Howard to work at the USDA's Bureau of Entomology. During this time Smith held several assignments including the Boll Weevil Eradication Program, the Gypsy Moth Parasite Laboratory in Melrose Highlands, Massachusetts, and a 1912 collaboration in Italy with Filippo Silvestri to identify a natural predator to the alfalfa weevil.

On the recommendation of his boss, Howard, Smith was selected by the California State Commissioner of Horticulture, A. J. Cook, to serve as Superintendent of the newly created State Insectary beginning January 1, 1913. In 1919 the State of California created the State Department of Agriculture with Smith the Chief of the Bureau of Pest Control. Eventually entomological research was stripped from the regulatory functions of the department and migrated to the University of California's College of Agriculture.

Smith coined the term "biological control" in his 1919 article "On some phases of insect control by the biological method" for the Journal of Economic Entomology, referring to the reliance on the natural enemies of pests to effect control, as opposed to the use of pesticide.

== University of California ==
With the transition of entomology research to the University of California Citrus Experiment Station in 1923, Smith's research division was refashioned as the Division of Beneficial Insect Investigations and Smith was appointed an associate professor at UCR where he remained until his retirement in 1951. The division would remain wholly apart from University of California's Entomology department until the department and its pair at University of California, Berkeley were closed in 1989. Thanks to his correspondence with Dr. A. J. Nicholson, the Chief Entomologist at the Australian Commonwealth Scientific and Industrial Research Organisation, Smith initiated the first Federally-approved weed control program, the control of Klamath weed by importing insects from Australia. Smith also established the Laboratory of Insect Pathology, appointing Edward Arthur Steinhaus as its first head.

In 1953, Smith's alma mater awarded him an honorary Doctor of Science degree. He died on 28 November 1957.

Smith has been considered "a renowned researcher in the biological control of citrus pests for the University of California."

== Partial bibliography ==
- "The sphegoidea of Nebraska (M.A. Thesis)". University of Nebraska. 1908. OCLC 41414178.
- The Efficacy and Economic Effects of Plant Quarantines in California. Literary Licensing. 2013. ISBN 978-1-258-59738-2.
- "An Attempt to Redefine the Host Relationships Exhibited by Entomorphagus Insects". Journal of Economic Entomology: 477–486. 1916.
- The Chalcidoid Genus Perilampus and Its Relations to the Problem of Parasite Introduction. Results, Technical, from the gipsy moth parasite laboratory. Government Printing Office. 1912-04-22.
- Smith, Harry Scott (1907). "Contributions toward a Monograph of the Ceratinidæ of North and Middle America". Transactions of the American Entomological Society. 33 (2): 115–124. JSTOR 25076829.

== Memorials ==
In 1967, UCR's Department of Biological Control established the Harry Scott Smith Award to recognize achievements in the biological control of insects. The first award went to Canadian scientist William Robin Thompson with a $1000 honorarium. A separate award for graduate students in biological control was established in 1966.

The Harry S. Smith scholarship fund was established for students studying biological control, started with a $15,000 bequest from Smith for that purpose.

The archives of Smith's papers are now stored with the Entomology Department of UCR.
