= Lassen County Court House =

- U.S. National Register of Historic Places
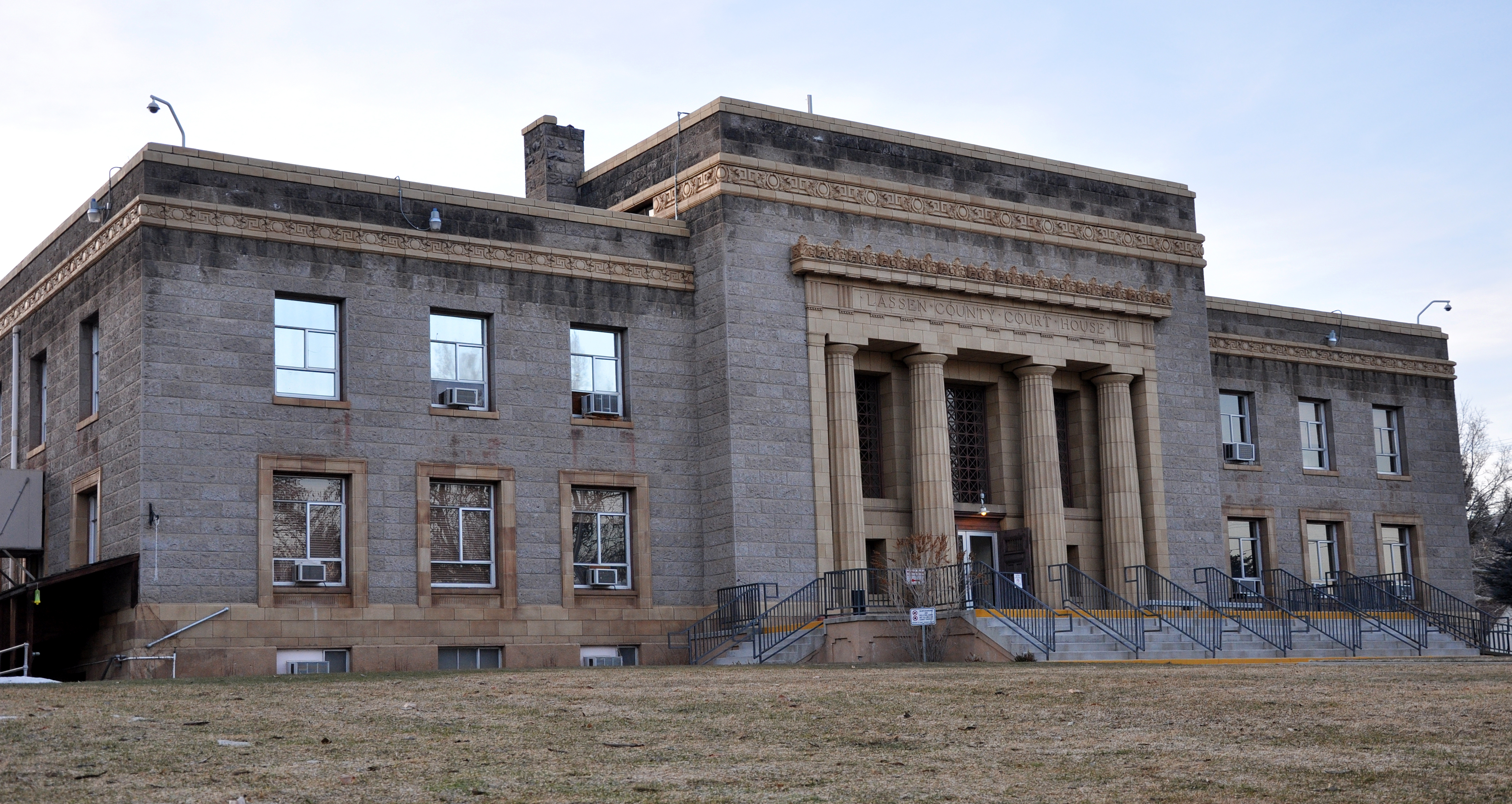

- Location within California Location within the United States
- Interactive map showing the location of Lassen County Courthouse
- Location: Courthouse Square, Susanville, California
- Coordinates: 40°24′59″N 120°39′45″W
- Area: 1.5 acres (0.61 ha)
- Built: 1917
- Built by: James L. McLaughlin
- Architect: George C. Sellon
- Architectural style: Classical Revival
- NRHP reference No.: 97001659
- Added to NRHP: January 23, 1998

The Lassen County Court House, on Courthouse Square in Susanville, California, is a courthouse built in 1917. It was listed on the National Register of Historic Places in 1998.

It was designed by architect George C. Sellon and is Classical Revival in style.
