= Tower Hall (San Jose State University) =

Building of San Jose State University

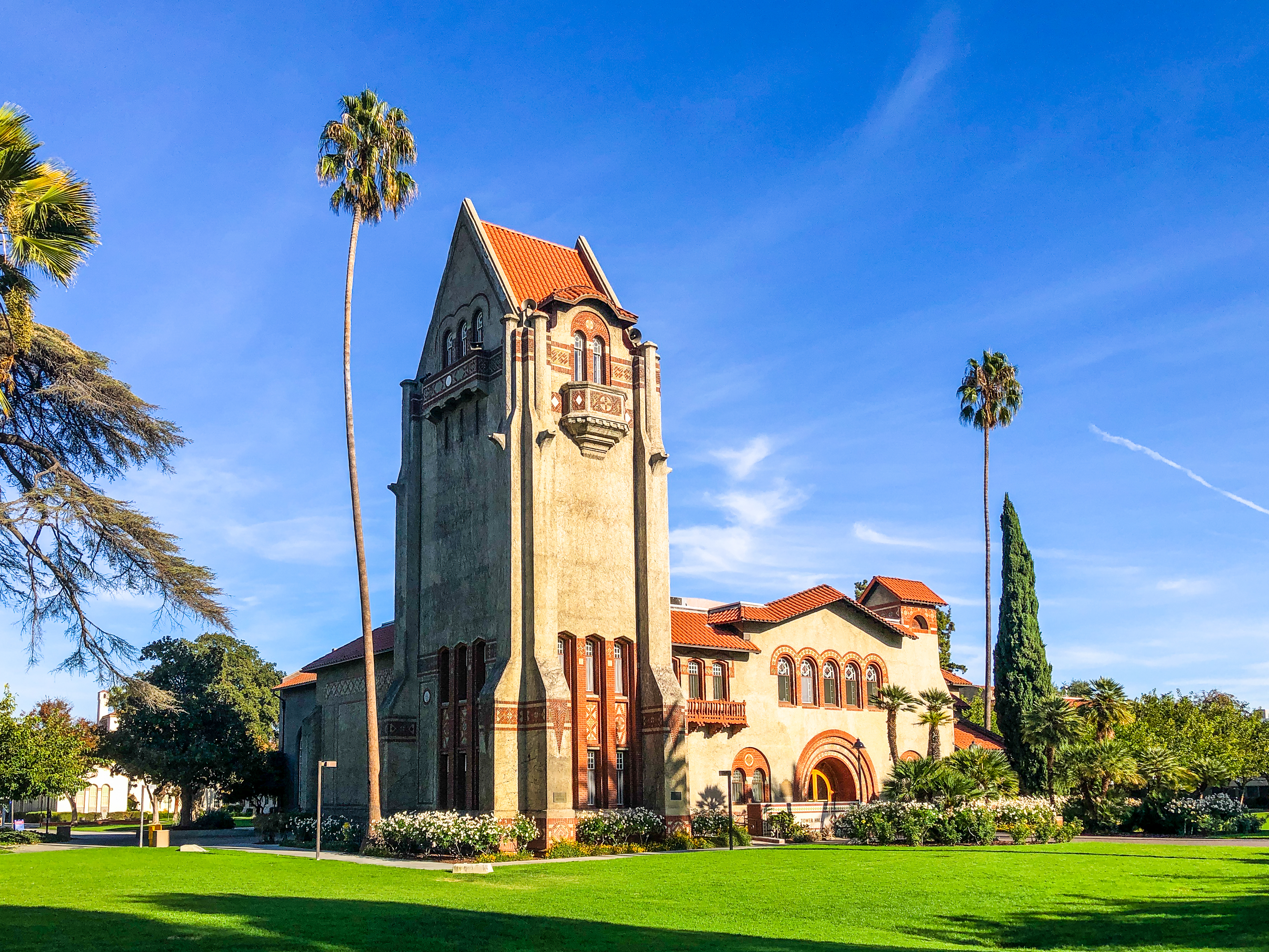
- Interactive map of Tower Hall
- Location: One Washington Square, San Jose, California, U.S.
- Coordinates: 37°20′06.9″N 121°53′00.4″W
- Built: 1910; 115 years ago
- Architect: George Sellon & Edward Hemmings
- Architectural style: Spanish-Colonial Revival
- Owner: San Jose State University

California Historical Landmark
- Official name: No. 417 First Normal School in California (San Jose State College)
- Designated: January 6, 1949
- Reference no.: 417

Tower Hall is the oldest building on the campus of San Jose State University in San Jose, California. It was constructed in the Spanish Colonial Revival style in 1910. It was designed by California-based architects George Sellon & Edward Hemmings.

== History ==
When the California State Normal School moved to San Jose in 1871, a new facility was constructed at Washington Square Park at S. 4th and San Carlos Streets. The first California State Normal School building was completed in 1872. It contained a library on the first floor and classrooms on the second. The building burned down on February 10, 1880. It was soon replaced by a new building which opened in 1881. The second building was destroyed in the 1906 San Francisco earthquake.

The third building, today known as Tower Hall, was built in 1910 along with a connected complex of buildings that housed the entirety of the California State Normal School. Most of the connected buildings were demolished in 1964 due to earthquake safety concerns, creating what is today known as the quadrangle. However, Tower Hall survived after extensive protest by alumni and students and was restored in 1966, and again in 2007. Today the building continues its role as both a classroom and auditorium.

== Interior ==
The 781-seat Morris Daily Auditorium is located in Tower Hall and currently serves as one of San Jose State's largest classrooms. For many years, the Office of the President and several other administrative offices were located in Tower Hall. In spring 2022, the university opened a new Alumni Center in the historic building.

== In popular culture ==
Tower Hall was briefly shown in a 2021 episode of Craig of the Creek.

== Gallery ==
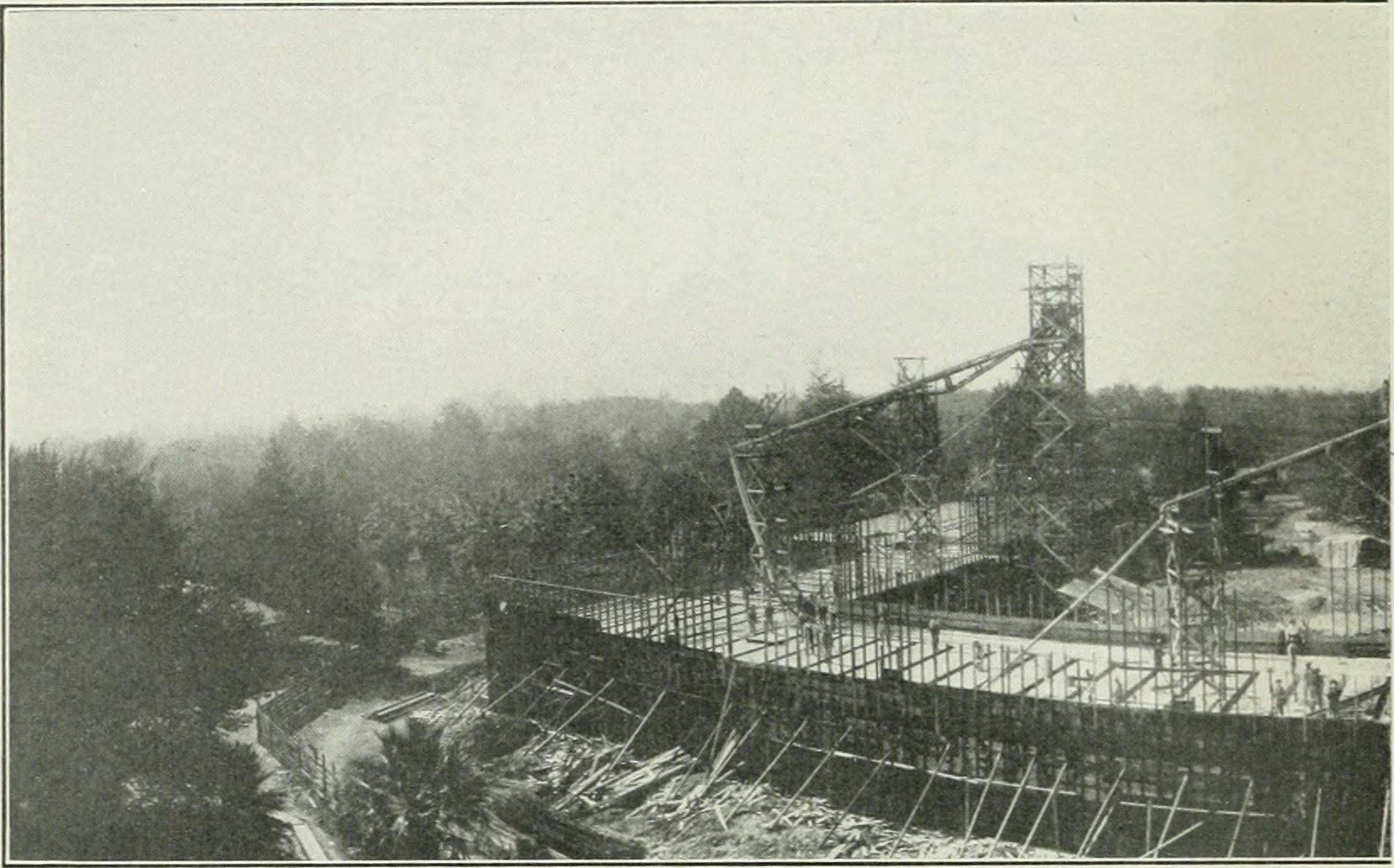
Tower Hall mid-construction

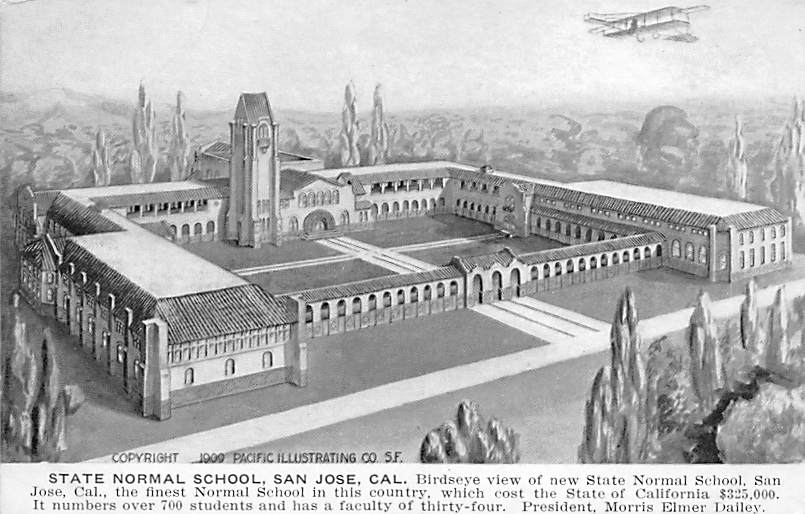
Tower Hall and connected buildings, 1909

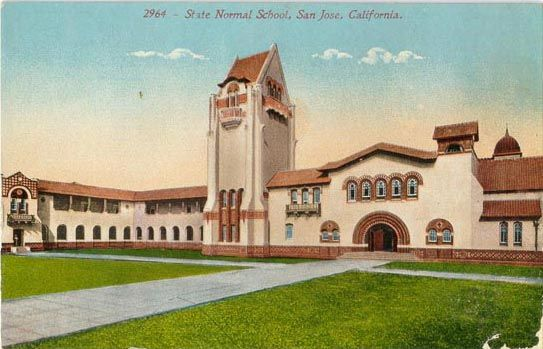
A postcard of Tower Hall, 1910
