= Mamie Perry Wood =

American opera singer

Mamie Perry Wood (1862–1949) was an American classical singer who was trained in Italy and lived in Los Angeles, California. As the city's first operatic diva, she was credited with bringing enthusiasm for grand opera to the city.

Mamie Modini-Wood as Queen of the Los Angeles Fiesta, 1896

== Education and musical career ==
As a child, wrote Ed Ainsworth of the Los Angeles Times, Mamie Perry "soon showed a natural inclination to sing. by the time she was in her teens it was obvious her talent was of a high order."

When the girl was fifteen, her first voice teacher in Los Angeles was Lizzie Hutchinson Cogswell. She began her studies at Mills Seminary in Oakland in the winter of 1877-78 and continued there in 1878. Returned to Los Angeles, she studied in 1878–79 with Madame Marra Vorron.

A Los Angeles Herald critic said that since her first concert she had "developed a positively phenomenal soprano voice, though, of course, it is yet but in the infancy of its development. . . . she has a magnificent organ and a musical aptitude which has accomplished wonders . . . ."

In 1881, Perry went to Milan, Italy, to study first under Professor Albitis and then Antonio Sangiovanni of Mantua. She made her debut in Ostiglia in October 1881, as the lead in The Countess of Amalfi, assuming the stage name of Maria Perrini. "She was so very fine that the public named her the 'Canary of the Pacific,'" wrote her impresario, A. Manzoni. The Gazeta dei Teatre said of her that:

not yet twenty years of age, [she] has from her good schooling acquired an admirable agility, a grand extension of voice and exquisite grace, a queenly appearance and rare rare beauty. Every evening she is greeted with crushing applause from her first appearance until her last note.

She also sang in Milan, Florence and elsewhere, Ainsworth wrote, "in the then-popular opera Contessa d'Amalfi and was received with great enthusiasm. . . . All this time, of course, Los Angeles was bursting with pride over its first prodigy. The newspapers carried accounts of Mamie's triumphs and everybody eagerly awaited her return."

The city "found in Miss Perry the qualities it most wanted — and it gave her the fullest measure of its adulation and devotion as the first 'native-born' star ever to emerge here. . . . She sang in choirs and at benefits and, indeed, lent her voice to any good cause."

Ainsworth wrote that the singer "contributed her interest and talents to the upbringing of the community's musical consciousness. . . . Out of all this grew the golden age of early-day musical and theatrical events in Los Angeles."

In 1881 Mamie Perry and her father went to San Francisco with the idea of returning "with a full operatic troupe and [to] give a series of three subscription concerts" in Los Angeles.

== Personal life ==
=== Childhood ===
Mamie was the daughter of Elizabeth M. Dalton and William Hayes Perry, a "California pioneer and lumber king." She was born near the Los Angeles Plaza to Dalton, "a native of Ohio who came here by boat," and Perry, the first president of the city's water company and the man who first had gas piped to Los Angeles.

=== First marriage ===
In January 1882, Mamie Perry accepted a request signed by twenty-five leading Angelenos to present a concert in Los Angeles despite the fact that "we understand that you have very flattering offers to sing in San Francisco, we respectfully urge that you make your first appearance in America in this, your native city." It was signed by, among others, Isaias W. Hellman, J. S. Slauson, J.W.Wolfskill, Herman W. Hellman, Henry Dwight Barrows, Harris Newmark, Ygnacio Sepulveda, Frank Sabichi, Andrew Glassell, Stephen M. White, John Mansfield, Albert Fenner Kercheval, John G. Downey and James R. Toberman.

Perry accepted and gave her performance on February 18, 1882, at Turnverein Hall.

The city was so excited that the City Council was compelled to adjourn for lack of a quorum, and tickets were at a premium for the event. The newspapers went into ecstasies over the entire affair, including such headline outbursts as AN OVATION TO THE YOUNG CANTATRICE.

At the same time, a man named C.W. Davis of Idaho was staying in the Pico House hotel. Charles W. Davis was the architect for a new Presbyterian Church on the corner of Fort and Second streets.

"The Mamie Perry Concert Troupe" was organized in spring 1883 to give a concert at Turnverein Hall and then make a tour of San Bernardino, Riverside, San Diego and Santa Barbara. It included Charles Davis as flutist.

At some point, she and Davis were married, because in December 1883, she sang at a Los Angeles meeting of the Grand Army of the Republic under the title and name Major Mamie Perry Davis. She had been made an honorary member of the Frank Bartlett Post No. 6 of the G.A.R. Davis died on July 7, 1885.

=== Second marriage ===
Mrs. Charles Modini-Wood (Mamie Perry), center, attending the opera with her daughters, Mrs. J. Langford Stack (Elizabeth), left, and Mrs. G.W. Pearson (Mona), on February 23, 1931

Mamie Perry Davis was married on June 3, 1890, to Charles Modini Wood of Springfield, Illinois, in her parental residence at 1315 Mount Pleasant Street, Boyle Heights, Los Angeles. The house is now in the Heritage Square Museum in Montecito Heights, Los Angeles. Daughter Elizabeth (later Mrs. James Langford Stack) was born the same year. A son, W. Perry Wood, was born to the "charming ex-queen of La Fiesta" on March 30, 1896. There were two other daughters, Mona (Mrs. George Pearson) and Mrs. Kenneth C. Beaton.

In 1890, she organized and was president of a "musically inclined" social group called the Tamale Club. It held its last quarterly meeting on December 6, 1890.

Under the name Modini-Wood (she used the hyphen), she was queen of the Los Angeles Fiesta in 1896. A grandson (through daughter Elizabeth), the Hollywood film actor Robert Stack, told a reporter in 1981 that his grandfather had turned the name Wood "upside down and it became Mood, added an ini, and it became Carlos Modini."

Charles Modini Wood died of inflammatory rheumatism, complicated by pneumonia, at the age of 73 on February 28, 1928.

=== Death ===
Mamie Perry Wood, as she was called then, died at the age of 88 on November 23, 1949, in her home in the Los Feliz district of Los Angeles. She was noted as "for half a century one of the leaders of the city's social and musical circles."

Services were at Forest Lawn Memorial Park (Glendale), where her ashes were inurned.

Her will left an income to her children from trusts as well as a life income of $120 a month to "Miss Romilda Corsetto," an employee who was age seven when she went to live in the Wood home fifty-three years previously.
