= Kysor =

Kysor is a surname. Notable people with the surname include:

- Charles H. Kysor (1883–1954), American architect
- Ezra F. Kysor (1835–1907), American architect
