= Daniel William Coquillett =

American entomologist (1856–1911)

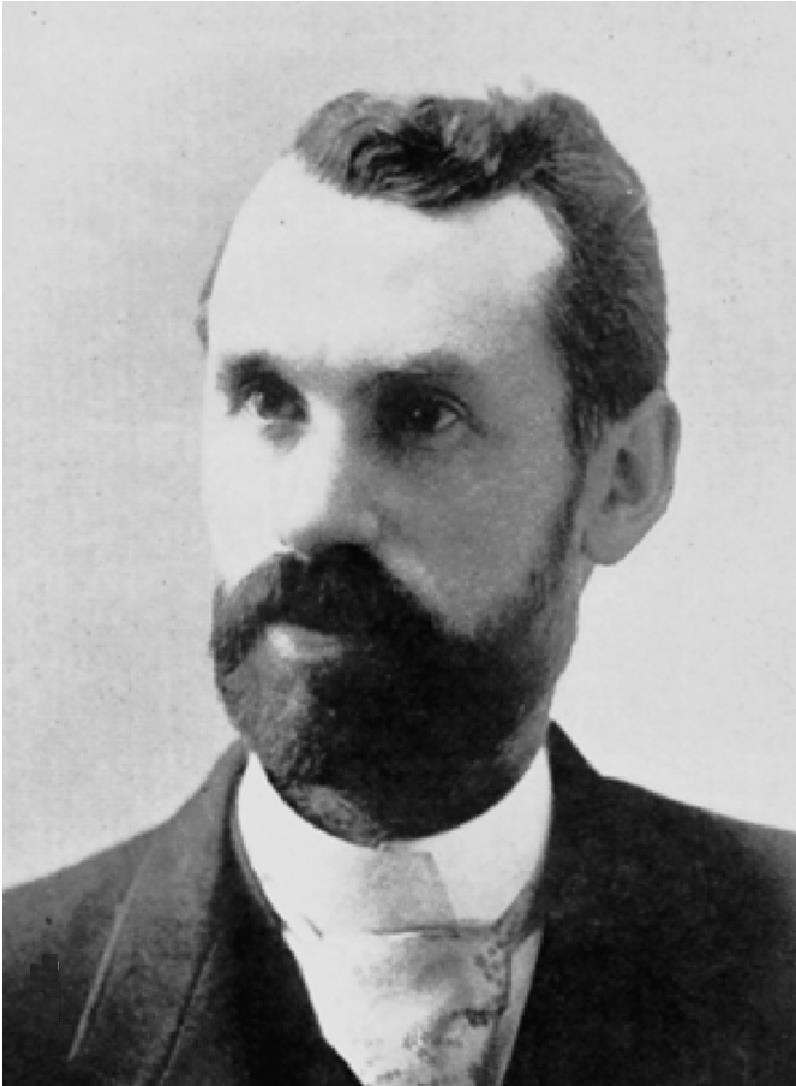
- Coquillett c. 1896
- Born: January 23, 1856; Pleasant Valley, Illinois, United States
- Died: July 7, 1911 (aged 55); Atlantic City, New Jersey, United States
- Occupation: Entomology
- Known for: Wrote a revision of the dipterous family Therevidae

Daniel William Coquillett (23 January 1856 – 7 July 1911) was an American entomologist who specialised in flies. He wrote a revision of the dipterous family Therevidae and many other scientific papers in which he described many new species and genera of flies. Coquillett was also the first to attempt fumigation with hydrocyanic acid as a means for controlling citrus scale insects. He experimented in the Wolfskill orange groves where he was supported by the foreman and later quarantine entomologist Alexander Craw in 1888–89.
