= List of people from Los Feliz, Los Angeles =

This is a list of notable people who were born or have lived a significant amount of time in Los Feliz, Los Angeles, California.

== Arts ==
=== Architects ===
- Michael Rotondi

=== Artists ===
- Shepard Fairey
- Joe Matt
- Faris McReynolds

=== Authors ===
- Cat Bauer
- Stefano Bloch
- Theresa Breslin
- Raymond Chandler
- Ariel Durant
- Will Durant
- Jenji Kohan
- Andrea Portes
- Buddy Wakefield

=== Film and television ===
==== Actors ====
- Casey Affleck
- Malin Åkerman
- Kirstie Alley
- James Avery
- Drake Bell
- Kristen Bell
- Troian Bellisario
- Ashley Benson
- Valerie Bertinelli
- Jason Biggs
- Rachel Bilson
- Danny Bonaduce
- Kate Burton
- Bill Burr
- Adam Campbell
- Katharine Cornell
- Tom Cruise
- Jon Cryer
- Geena Davis
- Leonardo DiCaprio
- Zac Efron
- Shannon Elizabeth
- Colin Farrell
- Sally Field
- Megan Fox
- Mel Gibson
- Crispin Glover
- Joseph Gordon-Levitt
- Ryan Gosling
- Lauren Graham
- Adrian Grenier
- Tony Hale
- Jon Hamm
- Gale Harold
- Katherine Heigl
- Terrence Howard
- Vanessa Hudgens
- Thomas Jane
- Angelina Jolie
- January Jones
- Steve Kazee
- Val Kilmer
- T.R. Knight
- Ali Landry
- Johnny Lewis
- Bela Lugosi
- Kelly Lynch
- Dave Mallow
- Rooney Mara
- Danny Masterson
- Jayma Mays
- Rose McGowan
- Joel McHale
- Eva Mendes
- Marilyn Monroe (attended kindergarten at Dorris Place Elementary School, near Dodger Stadium)
- Mandy Moore
- Antonio Moreno
- Taylor Negron, comedian and character actor
- Patton Oswalt
- Chris Parnell
- Jim Parsons
- Robert Pattinson
- Bijou Phillips
- David Hyde Pierce
- Chris Pine
- Brad Pitt
- Natalie Portman
- Parker Posey
- Paula Poundstone
- June Diane Raphael
- Zachary Quinto
- Giovanni Ribisi
- Christina Ricci
- Naya Rivera
- Katey Sagal
- Paul Scheer
- Joshua Seth
- Michael Sheen
- Alexander Skarsgård
- Kristen Stewart
- Kiefer Sutherland
- Juno Temple
- Henry Thomas
- Jonathan Taylor Thomas
- Lily Tomlin
- Liv Tyler
- Blair Underwood
- Kate Walsh
- Jennifer Westfeldt
- Owen Wilson
- Rebel Wilson

==== Cartoonists ====
- Walt Disney
- Mimi Pond

==== Directors ====
- James Cameron
- Brad Copeland
- Patrick Creadon
- Frank Darabont
- Cecil B. DeMille
- David Fincher
- Spike Jonze
- James Melkonian
- Angela Robinson
- Steven Soderbergh
- Gus Van Sant
- Ronny Yu
- Livi Zheng

==== Producers ====
- Courtney Lilly

=== Music ===
- The Airborne Toxic Event

==== Musicians ====
- Ryan Adams
- Michael Balzary
- Beck
- Drake Bell
- Vivian Campbell
- Danny Carey
- Glenn Danzig
- Mark Oliver Everett
- Ernie Halter
- Carly Rae Jepsen
- Al Jolson
- Joe Jonas
- Tony Kanal
- Maynard James Keenan
- Anthony Kiedis
- Joe Lally
- Adam Levine
- Demi Lovato
- Courtney Love
- Madonna (US residence)
- Aimee Mann
- AJ McLean
- Dieter Meier
- Keith Morris
- Karen O
- Finneas O'Connell
- Michael Penn
- Katy Perry
- Rihanna
- Mark Ronson
- Gavin Rossdale
- Rusko
- Jesse James Rutherford
- Kim Shattuck
- Slash
- Gwen Stefani
- Alex Turner
- James Valentine
- Eddie Van Halen
- Joey Waronker
- will.i.am

==== Record executives ====
- Lyor Cohen

==== Singers ====
- Mamie Perry Wood, brought opera to Los Angeles

=== TV and radio ===
- Jules Asner
- Michelle Beadle
- Jo Frost (part-time resident)
- Filip Hammar
- Jim Hill
- Ross King
- Tom Leykis
- Pat O'Brien

== Business ==
- Heidi Fleiss
- Howard Hughes
- Arthur Letts

== Crime and punishment ==
- William J. Bratton
- Johnnie Cochran (where he died in April 2005)
- Lance Ito (lived there as a child)
- Leno and Rosemary LaBianca (killed there in 1969)

== Sports ==
- Steve Berra
- Eric Koston
