= Mount Pleasant House (Los Angeles, California) =

Historic house in California, United States

- U.S. National Register of Historic Places
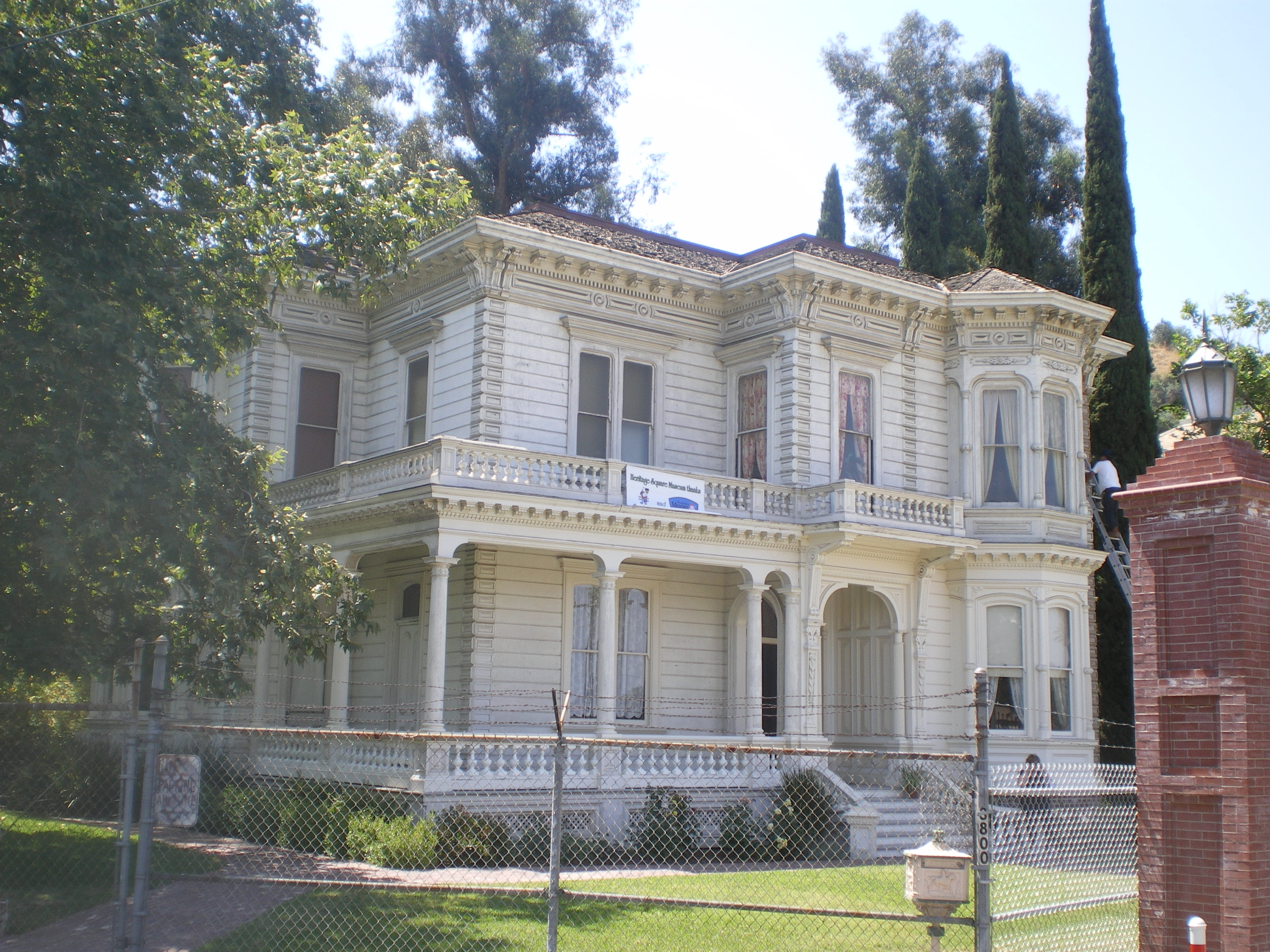
- Mount Pleasant House, 2008

- Location within the Los Angeles metropolitan area Location within California Location within the United States
- Location: 3800 Homer St., Heritage Square, Montecito Heights, Los Angeles, California
- Coordinates: 34°05′17″N 118°12′25″W
- Area: 0.1 acres (0.040 ha)
- Built: 1875-76
- Architect: Kysor & Mathews
- Architectural style: Italianate
- NRHP reference No.: 76000490
- Added to NRHP: December 12, 1976

Mount Pleasant House is a residence built in 1875-76 for William Hayes Perry in Boyle Heights. It was designed by Kysor & Mathews in Italianate style. The home was relocated in 1975 to the Heritage Square Museum in the Montecito Heights section of Los Angeles, California. It was listed on the National Register of Historic Places in 1976.

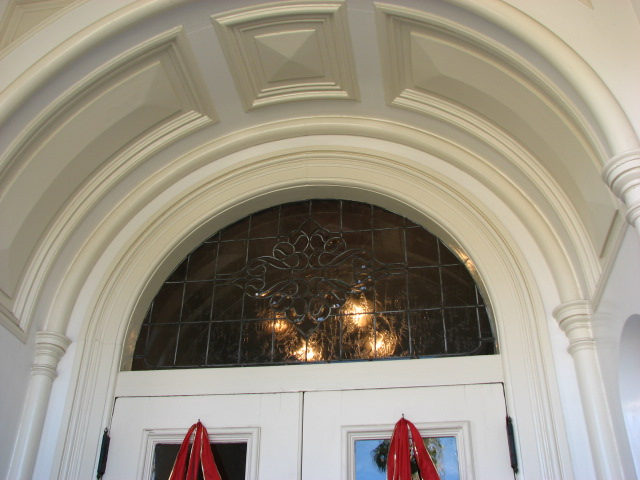
Mount Pleasant arch

Perry organized Los Angeles's first gas company, the Los Angeles Gas Company, and served as president and General Manager for five years. He served on the City Council in 1866 and 1869. From 1879 on he served as Manager of the Los Angeles City Water Company for 25 years.

It was later the home of judge Stephan C. Hubbell.

In 1935 the house became a home for unwed mothers.

== See also ==
- List of Registered Historic Places in Los Angeles
