= Campus of the University of Southern California =

Campus in Los Angeles, California

The Campus of the University of Southern California, also known as the University Park Campus, is located in the Exposition Park neighborhood of Los Angeles, California. The campus sprawls across 226 acres and contains most of the academic facilities and residential buildings of the University of Southern California. The University Park campus is in the University Park district of Los Angeles, 2 miles (3.2 km) southwest of downtown Los Angeles. The campus's boundaries are Jefferson Boulevard on the north and northeast, Figueroa Street on the southeast, Exposition Boulevard on the south, and Vermont Avenue on the west. Since the 1960s, through-campus vehicle traffic has been either severely restricted or entirely prohibited on some thoroughfares. The University Park campus is within walking distance to Los Angeles landmarks such as the Shrine Auditorium and Los Angeles Memorial Coliseum, which is operated and managed by the University. Most buildings are in the Romanesque Revival style, although some dormitories, engineering buildings, and physical sciences labs are of various Modernist styles (especially two large Brutalist dormitories at the campus's northern edge) that sharply contrast with the predominantly red-brick campus. Widney Alumni House, built-in 1880, is the oldest university building in Southern California. In recent years the campus has been renovated to remove the vestiges of old roads and replace them with traditional university quads and gardens. The historic portion of the main campus was listed on the National Register of Historic Places in 2015.

== Campus History ==
=== Early Development (1880–1919) ===
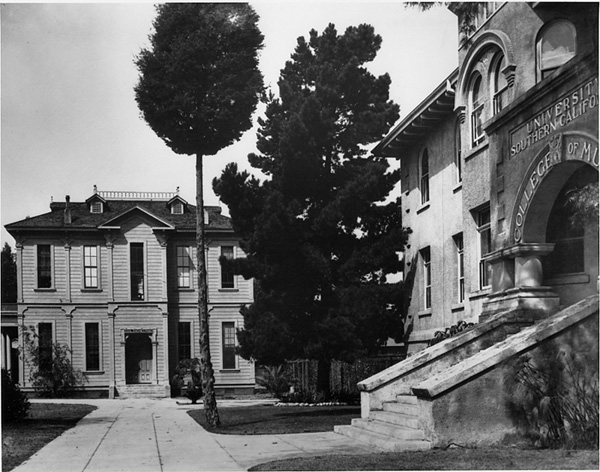
Widney Alumni House seen across the College of Medicine

The University of Southern California was originally situated at the intersection of Jefferson Boulevard and Hoover Street and contained eight acres. At this time, the land on which the campus was situated consisted primarily of various farmlands. Its original campus was founded on 308 lots of land donated by Ozro Childs, John Gately Downey, and Isaias W. Hellman and contained a rag-tag group of academic buildings. Its first building, the Widney Alumni House, still remains in continuous use, and stands as the oldest university building in Southern California. It is registered as a California Historical Landmark (No. 546) as the Original Building of the University of Southern California. Originally, this building contained all of the university's functions, including its first library. In 1884, the College of Liberal Arts building was constructed to house the expanding student body and additional academic facilities. This building, colloquially referred to as "Old College," would be demolished in 1948. Around this time, the Los Angeles Electric Railway constructed its University Line, which further spurred growth in the region.

In 1885, the College of Medicine was founded, and accordingly the Founders Building of the University of Southern California College of Medicine was constructed. In 1906, the Barlow Medical Library, designed by Robert D. Farquhar, was constructed opposite to the Founders Building to supplement the College of Medicine. In 1901, the College of Fine Arts was founded, and a building was constructed to house this new program as well as its students. This building would be destroyed in a fire in 1910. In 1911, a new building, designed by Robert Train and Robert E. Williams was built in the shingle style. USC would vacate this building in 1920, but the building would later become listed on the Los Angeles Historic-Cultural Monument list (No. 62) as well as added to the National Register of Historic Places. In 1905, the College of Liberal Arts building was expanded with the addition of two new wings to house the University's first proper library. In 1907, the Chemistry building was completed. In 1916, additional land was purchased by the University in preparation for future campus expansions.

Additional to the construction activities, the University also acquired a multitude of formerly residential buildings in the surrounding neighborhoods. Some of these buildings include the Freshman Writing House, the Joint Educational Project House, and the Dosan Ahn Chang Ho Family House.

=== First Masterplan (1920–1945) ===
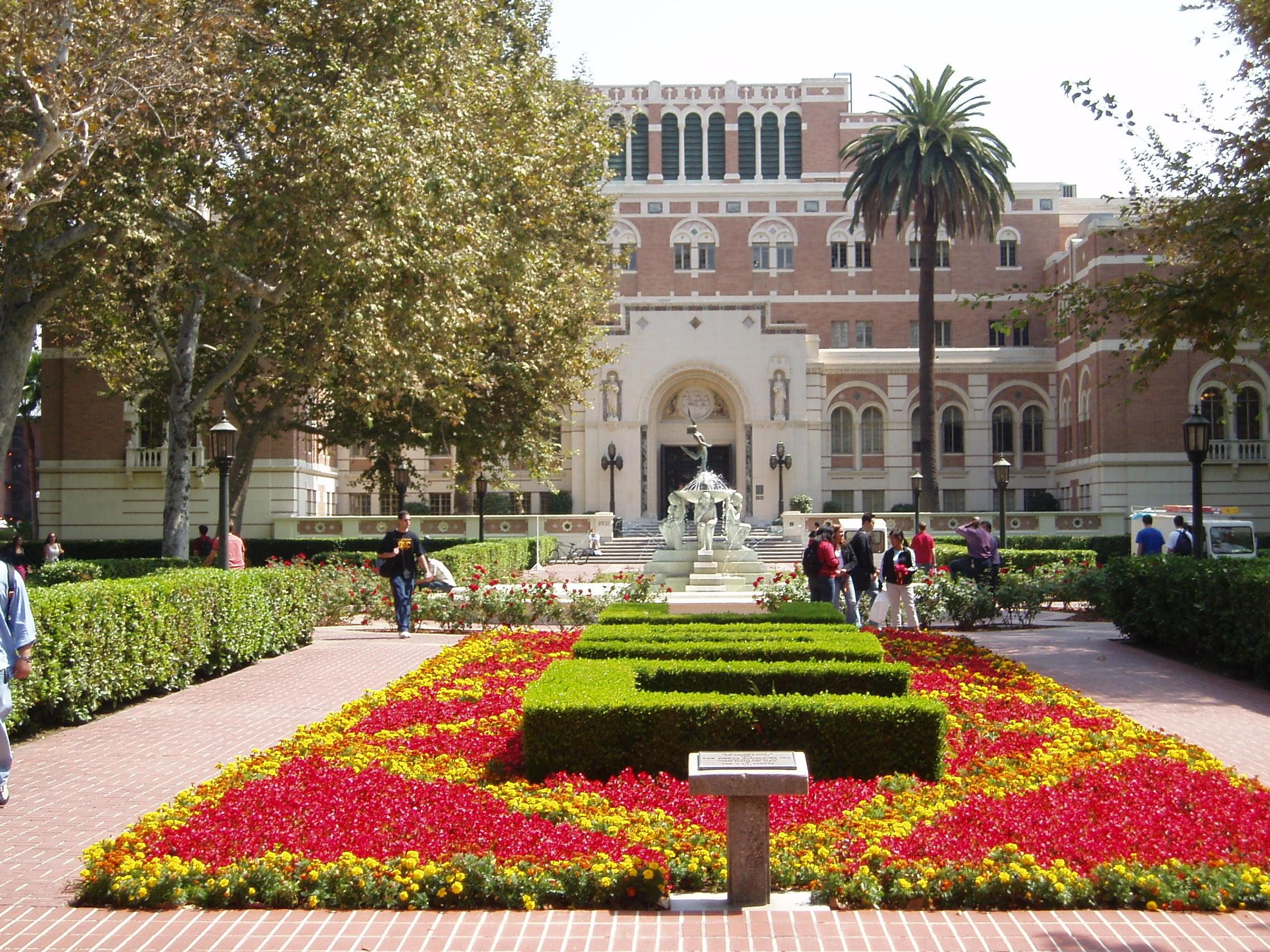
Doheny Memorial Library was completed in 1932 and dedicated to Edward L. Doheny.

Throughout this time, the University saw rapid growth in its enrollment numbers and administration decided that a cohesive plan for projected expansion was required. In 1919, John Parkinson was commissioned by the University to design a masterplan for the expansion of the University. Parkinson's campus was centered around what was then University Avenue (now Trousdale Parkway), and heavily employed the Romanesque Revival style of architecture, using red brick and cream-colored limestone, which remains prominent on the campus still today. Accordingly, this period saw an aggressive boom in campus construction activity, including some of the most iconic buildings today and form much of the campus's historic core. In 1919, the Bovard administrative building was completed, which housed much of the University's administrative activities. In 1925, the building for the Law School was completed. Additionally nearby in Expo Park, the Los Angeles Memorial Coliseum was completed in 1923. USC would play Pomona in the inaugural game. In 1927 the Student Union building was completed alongside Bridge Hall.

In addition to the Parkinsons, many other notable local architects also contributed to the expansion of the campus during this time. In 1929, the Ralph C. Flewelling-designed Mudd Hall was completed as the Seely W. Mudd Memorial Hall of Philosophy. This building stood as the tallest on campus until the completion of the Von Kleinsmid Center in 1966. In 1930, the famous shrine of Tommy Trojan, sculpted by Roger Noble Burnham, was unveiled outside of Bovard. The Methodist Episcopal University Church, designed by C. Raimond Johnson, was completed in 1931. In 1932, Doheny Memorial Library, designed by Ralph Adams Cram, was completed. The courtyard created between Doheny and Bovard formed the centerpiece of Parkinson's campus, and features an expansive park lined with sycamore trees, pedestrian paths, and a central fountain.

A second wave of construction commenced just prior to World War II, resulting in the construction of four notable buildings. In 1939, the Harris Hall of Architecture and Fine Arts, also designed by Flewelling, and the Fisher Gallery were completed. In 1940, the Biegler Hall of Engineering was completed. The Allan Hancock Foundation building was completed in 1941 and now houses the Hancock Memorial Museum. While these buildings still by-and-large followed the Romanesque styling found elsewhere on campus, they also began to incorporate elements of more contemporary styles such as those employed by the Public Works Administration. During World War II, a hiatus on large-scale campus construction was observed as the University focused more on constructing temporary barracks for military personnel.

In 1950, Founders Hall is completed alongside the Commons.

=== Second Masterplan (1946–1959) ===
As World War II drew to a close, it became apparent to University administration that a new masterplan was necessary for transitioning the University for the post-war era. Key objectives of this new plan were to absorb the exploding student population as well as update the current campus. Accordingly, President Rufus B. von KleinSmid commissioned architects Henry C. Burge, Arthur B. Gallion, and C. Raimond Johnson to design a new masterplan for geographic expansion and campus construction. The philosophy of this plan greatly diverged from that of the Pinkerson plan. Whereas the previous plan placed great rigidity on the architectural styles of the buildings as well as how buildings would be apportioned between departments, this new masterplan placed emphasis on flexibility, choosing not to specify any architectural style to be used or how departments were to share spaces. Rather, it offered more generalized recommendations on where certain facilities should be located and recommended an adherence to the red brick aesthetic established per the Pinkerson plan. It was through this plan that the clear boundaries of the campus began to become realized: Exposition Boulevard, Figueroa Street, Jefferson Boulevard, and McClintock Avenue. Additionally, this plan proposed using portions of the land within these campus boundaries for surface parking lots as well as closed the internal campus street network to traffic. Whereas the previous plan was automobile-oriented, this new one placed emphasis on the pedestrian. Traffic through Trousdale Parkway was formally closed in 1953.

The architectural styling of this period also sharply departed from the previous plan, notably abandoning the revivalist styles of yore for more the modernist styling of the time. These buildings greatly employed red brick and concrete to afford some semblance of cohesion amongst them. Some of the first buildings built during this period include Mark Taper Hall, designed by Marsh, Smith, and Powell, and the Elizabeth Von KleinSmid Memorial Residence, designed by Samuel E. London. Both were completed in 1950 in the International Style. Additionally, this period saw the rise of numerous Neo-Formalist buildings as well.

=== Third Masterplan (1960–1976) ===
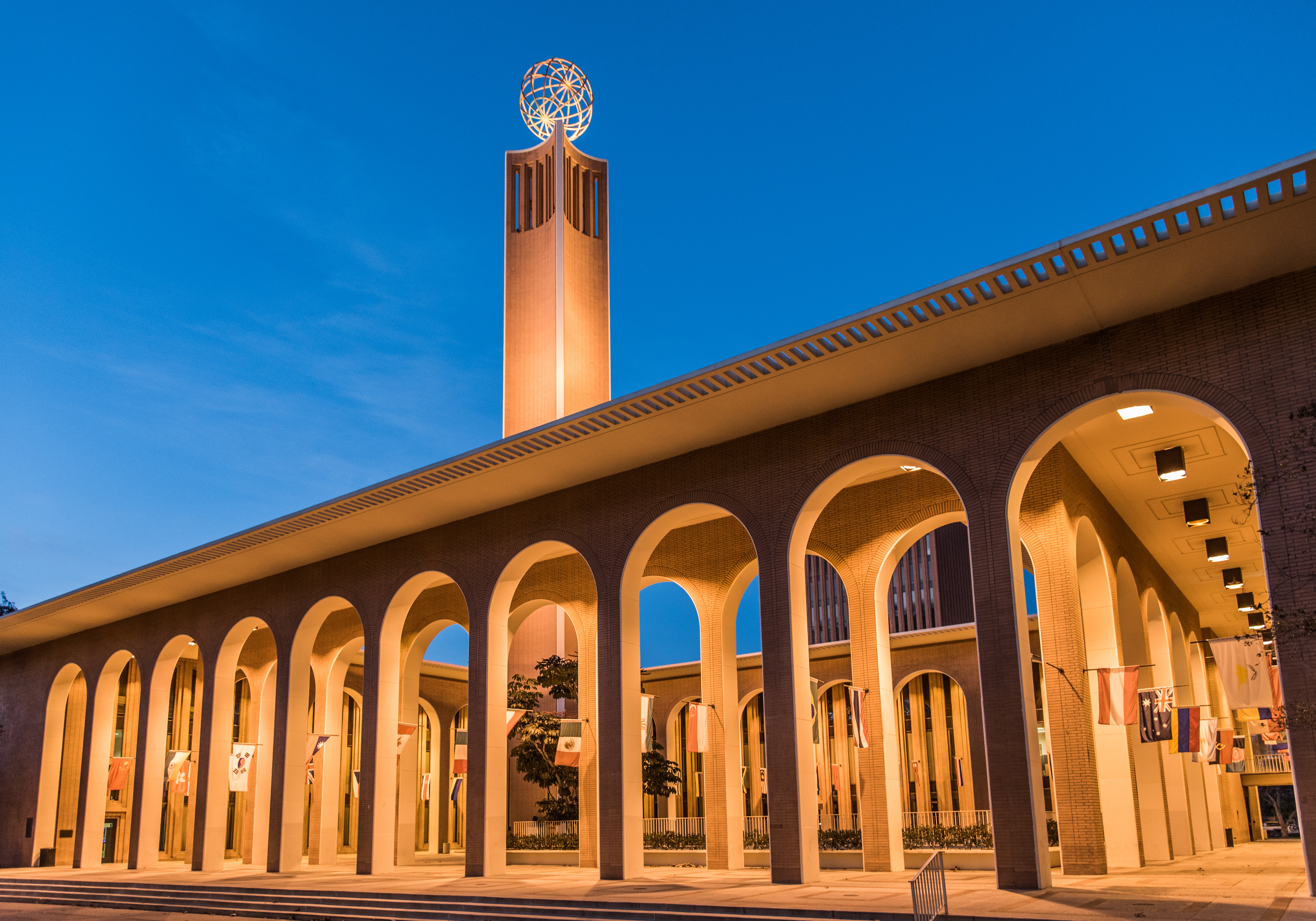
The Dr. Joseph Medicine Crow Center (formerly the Von KleinSmidt Center), designed by Edward Durell Stone.

Despite the implementation of the Gallion plan, the growing population could not adequately be contained. Accordingly, in 1960, President Norman Topping commissioned William L. Pereira to design another masterplan with an express focus on accommodating growth in enrollment and increase in research activity. Specifically, this plan set out to create housing villages, separate academic and non-academic facilities, establish a campus heart, and develop architecturally unique quadrangles. While Pereira drew inspiration for these quadrangles from Oxford, Cambridge, and Yale, the purpose of USC's quadrangles differ in that they were designed to create memorable public places, thereby creating a "sense of space," instead of solely community making. Specifically, each quadrangle was to contain a "jewel" which was to be a focal point. Moreover, this plan would expand the western boundary of the University to Vermont Avenue, adding 58 acres to the campus; the move resulted in the removal and leveling of several residential blocks. During this time, the campus was entirely shut off from external automobile traffic.

This period saw a dramatic rise in construction, with more than twenty completed in the 1960s and thirty more after 1970. These include the Ahmanson Center, Olin Hall, Stauffer Hall, Vivian Hall of Engineering, Booth Ferris Rehearsal Hall. Additionally, A. Quincy Jones designed the Annenberg School of Communications, Edward Durell Stone designed the Von KleinSmid Center and the Andrus Gerontology Center amongst others, and the Watt Hall of Architecture and Fine Arts, designed by Killingsworth, Brady, and Associates.

During this period, the campus also underwent certain redevelopments in preparation for the 1984 Olympic Games.

=== Infill Development (1977–2011) ===
Following the completion of the 1976 Masterplan, expansion of the general campus footprint generally slowed as the University matured to fill in much of its present-day boundaries. Rather, during this period a series of masterplans analyzed the needs of the surrounding Expo Park neighborhood as well as studying how effectively campus resources were being used. Through the 1988 Masterplan, prepared by Gin and Wong Associates, the planners identified certain non-academic functions which were offloaded to off campus buildings, such as the South Park Center (rebranded as the "USC Tower") in downtown Los Angeles, as well as identified certain areas with potential development. The 1992 Campus Plan identified certain growth objectives for undergraduate education and interdisciplinary research. Additionally, this plan introduced five new "transformative" project plans, such as the construction of Leavey Library.

During this era, the most substantial physical transformation of the campus was within the eastern portion. This area was previously bisected by Hoover Boulevard, which was a remnant of the original street network and still open to cars. During this project, the road was removed and the area was repurposed with new green spaces such as the McCarthy Quad and Argue Plaza, Leavey Library (opened in 1994), a relocated Widney Alumni House (reopened in 1997), new buildings for the Price School of Public Policy and Marshall School of Business which opened in 1999, and a new entrance gateway near the intersection of Exposition Boulevard and Figueroa Street.

Coinciding with the shift in focus away from outward expansion, the university increased its efforts to build relationships with the surrounding community, which contrasted with previous policies of urban renewal and large-scale master planning. Initiatives included the Good Neighbors Campaign, started in 1994.

=== Replacement of Mid-Century Buildings and USC Village (2012–Present) ===
Beginning in 2012, the University began exploring options for redeveloping what was then the "University Village" shopping area, as well as the land which contained the Cardinal Gardens apartments. Specifically, this new "USC Village" contains 1.25 million square feet of retail and residential space spread across a cluster of five-storied buildings, and expands USC's useable building space by 20%. This new development contains a new fitness center, basketball courts, the honors residential colleges, study halls, a Trader Joe's, Starbucks, Amazon Hub Lockers, and many other amenities. It is the largest project in South LA history.

From 2011-2019, under President C.L. Nikias, USC underwent a major fundraising campaign that resulted in the construction of numerous campus buildings. These included Engemann Health Center, Wallis Annenberg Hall, Fertitta Hall, Kaufman International Dance Center, and the Michelson Center for Convergent Bioscience, among others. These buildings utilized Romanesque techniques, in accordance with past university buildings, and replaced many buildings built during mid-century expansions.

== Health Sciences Campus ==
In addition to the main campus in University Park, the Keck School of Medicine has operated a medical school campus in the Boyle Heights neighborhood since 1952. This 79-acre campus contains the LAC+USC Medical Center, Keck School of Medicine, the Alfred E. Mann School of Pharmacy, as well as three teaching hospitals and a variety of research laboratories.

== Facilities and Buildings ==
=== Residence Halls ===
Housing at the University is split into three different kinds: traditional residence halls, such as dorms, suites, which occupy up to eight students, and apartments, which include a full kitchen. There are 19 undergraduate housing halls and 22 graduate housing options. Additionally, Freshman dorms are grouped into several "residential colleges."

==== Parkside Arts and Humanities Residential College and Parkside International Residential College ====
The Parkside colleges are located in the southwestern corner of campus and consist of multiple high-rise and low-rise buildings. The high-rise buildings were originally housing for married students. The International Residential College opened in January 2002.

==== South Residential College ====
South Residential College is made up by Marks Tower and Pardee Tower, both of which lie at the southeastern end of McCarthy Quad.

Additionally, South Residential College houses El Sol y Luna, a Latinx cultural floor, and Somerville Place, a floor dedicated towards fostering an appreciation for Black culture.

==== West Residential College ====
West Residential College is composed of Webb Tower, which houses 316 residents across its 14 stories—the tallest residence building at USC. The dorms in Webb Tower are composed of apartment style dorms which include full kitchens and en-suite bathrooms. Notably, Webb Tower does not have a thirteenth floor as thirteen is generally considered an unlucky number. Its elevator buttons jump from floor twelve immediately to floor fourteen. West Residential College is situated between the Lyon Center and the Engemann Student Health Center. West Residential College was constructed in 1972 in preparation for housing athletes at the 1984 Olympics.

Previously, West Residential College also included Fluor Tower, however Fluor was demolished starting in February 2022 in preparation for construction of the second phase of the USC Village. It had been vacant since 2020.

==== Birnkrant Residential College ====
Birnkrant Residential College is located immediately adjacent to Leavey Library on McCarthy Quad. Originally constructed in 1963, Birnkrant houses 260 residents across its eight floors, as well as the Trojan Grounds coffee shop on its ground level. Birnkrant is particularly known for its "eight floors of open doors" moniker, owing to its social nature. Each floor contains approximately 20 rooms, split evenly among men and women, as well as two communal bathrooms and a laundry room. Since 2017, one of its floors has housed the Asian, Pacific Islander, Desi American Leadership Community, also known as APIDA. It additionally houses numerous musical practice rooms and a study room across its ground floor. Originally, Birnkrant was an all-women residential college, housing 308 women. It is named after Cecele and Michael G. Birnkrant.

==== North Residential College ====
North Residential College comprises four residence halls: EVK, College, Harris, and University Halls. It was constructed in 1993. Across these halls reside 500 undergraduate students. Additionally, New North houses the Everybody's Kitchen residential dining hall, also known as EVK.

=== Marshall School of Business ===
Currently, the Marshall School of Business occupies five buildings across the southeastern corner of the University Park Campus. Namely, these buildings include the Accounting Building, which houses the Leventhal School of Accounting, Bridge Hall, Hoffman Hall, Popovich Hall, and Fertitta Hall, which house the Marshall School of Business.

==== Accounting Building ====
Erected in 1926, the first of these buildings to be constructed is the building which now houses the Leventhal School of Accounting. Originally, this building, designed by John and Donald Parkinson, housed the law school and later the School of Social Work.

==== Bridge Hall ====
Bridge Hall, named after Dr. Norman and Mrs. Mae Manford Bridge, was constructed in 1928, designed by the same architects as the Accounting Building. This was the first building to house the Business school (then known as the College of Commerce and Business Administration). Built in a Romanesque style, the exterior facade of Bridge Hall features many notable embellishments. Bridge Hall currently houses a mix of offices, classrooms for undergraduates, and the Blackstone LaunchPad at USC. In 2007, this building was renovated and modernized to create more office space across the second and third floors. Additionally, a trading room was added for students.

==== Hoffman Hall ====
Hoffman Hall is an eight-story tower built in 1965 by I.M. Pei following a gift by H. Leslie Hoffman.

== Campus Initiatives ==
=== Sustainability ===
Since 2008, the University has placed significant emphasis on promoting sustainability throughout its campus. That year, the Sustainability Steering Committee (SSC) and Office of Sustainability were founded to envision future endeavors. In 2014, the university installed solar panels to power the Wrigley Institute on Catalina Island. In 2015, the SSC launched their Sustainability 2020 master plan to coordinate and comprehensively consolidate all of the university's sustainability initiatives. Specifically, this plan outlined improving environmental literacy, strengthening the existing campus sustainability practices, reducing greenhouse gas emissions per square foot by 20%, reducing the quantity of single occupancy vehicles transporting to campus by increasing the participation of students and faculty in alternative transportation methods, engaging 75% of university departments in sustainable purchasing practices, achieving 75% waste diversion, and decreasing potable water use by 25%, all by 2020. In 2016, the LA Memorial Coliseum became the first collegiate football venue to achieve zero waste status. In 2017, the Provost approved of initial funding for the 2020 masterplan, including provisions towards waste diversion, water conservation, and procurement initiatives.

In September 2019, Carol Folt was inaugurated as the 12th president of the University. In her inaugural address, she outlined sustainability being one of her main priorities. At the VerdeXchange 2020 conference, she further reiterated many such sustainability goals. including envisioning carbon neutrality by 2028 as well as ramping up the usage of zero-emissions vehicles. Many of these goals were formalized under the 2028 sustainability masterplan, which is to set guide the University's sustainability initiatives at the expiration of the 2020 masterplan Specifically, this masterplan calls for the elimination of single-use plastics, dramatic reductions of greenhouse gases, and installing more charging stations at USC parking garages. In addition to this, the university is also installing 150,000 LED lights across campus and mounting solar panels atop the Galen Center.

== Transportation ==
The University Park campus is served by numerous bus and metro routes. By bus, USC can be accessed on Route 38, 81, 204, 442, 445, 550, 754, and the Metro J lines. Additionally, USC is serviced by the metro E light rail line at Jefferson/USC and Expo Park/USC. Starting from October 2019, USC will subsidize half of public transit costs for all University employees. Additionally, from August 2024, USC began providing its students with a TAP U-Pass, which grants unlimited free rides across the LA metro system.

Furthermore, the University also operates its own busses within the main campus as well as to the parking center, Health Sciences Campus, Marina Del Rey ISI/ICT, Keck of Alhambra, and Union Station. Moreover, USC also provides a Campus Cruiser service as well as subsidizes Lyft rides for students within a certain perimeter of the University Park Campus.
