= Alexander Craw =

American entomologist

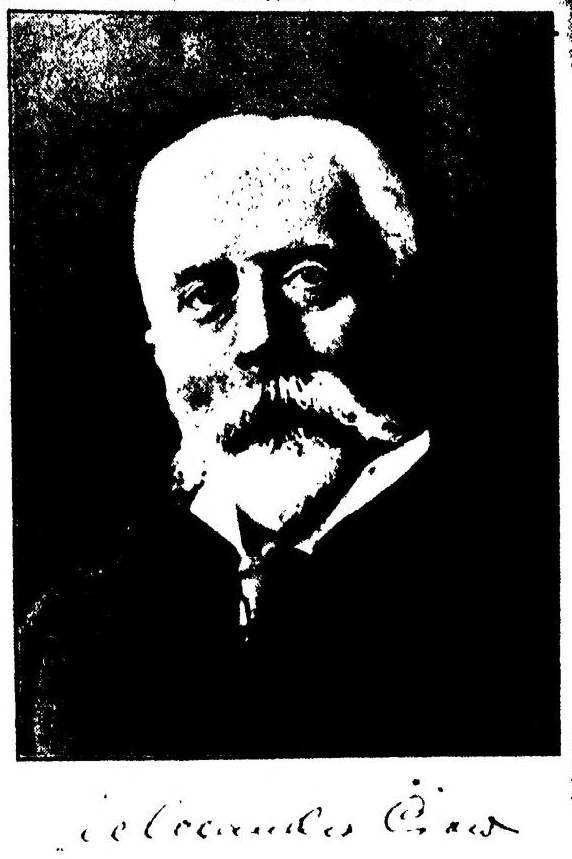
Alexander Craw

Alexander Craw (3 August 1850 – 28 June 1908) was a pioneer American economic entomologist. He was the first American entomologist to work in quarantine protection against foreign pests arriving by ship to San Francisco, California. Along with Albert Koebele he was involved in the introduction of Rodolia cardinalis from Australia to control Icerya purchasi. He was also involved in the introduction of Rhyzobius ventralis to control the black scale, Saissetia oleae.

Craw was born in Ayr, South Ayrshire, Scotland where he trained in horticulture. He worked in the Royal nurseries at Ascot and at Martins and Son, Cottingham before he moved to California in 1873 and worked as a horticulturist there. After two years in San Diego, he worked at the Wolfskill orange groves in Los Angeles and became a member of the Horticultural Commission of California. From 1890 he worked in the port of San Francisco as a quarantine officer to prevent the entry of potential pests. In 1904 he quit his California position and took up a position as superintendent of entomology to the board of agriculture and forestry in Hawaii where he established quarantine procedures. His position in California was taken up by E.M. Ehrhorn. Craw died of kidney failure at Wawona in the Yosemite valley at the home of his sister. His papers were destroyed in fires following the 1906 San Francisco earthquake.
