= Bryson Apartment Hotel =

- U.S. National Register of Historic Places
- Los Angeles Historic-Cultural Monument
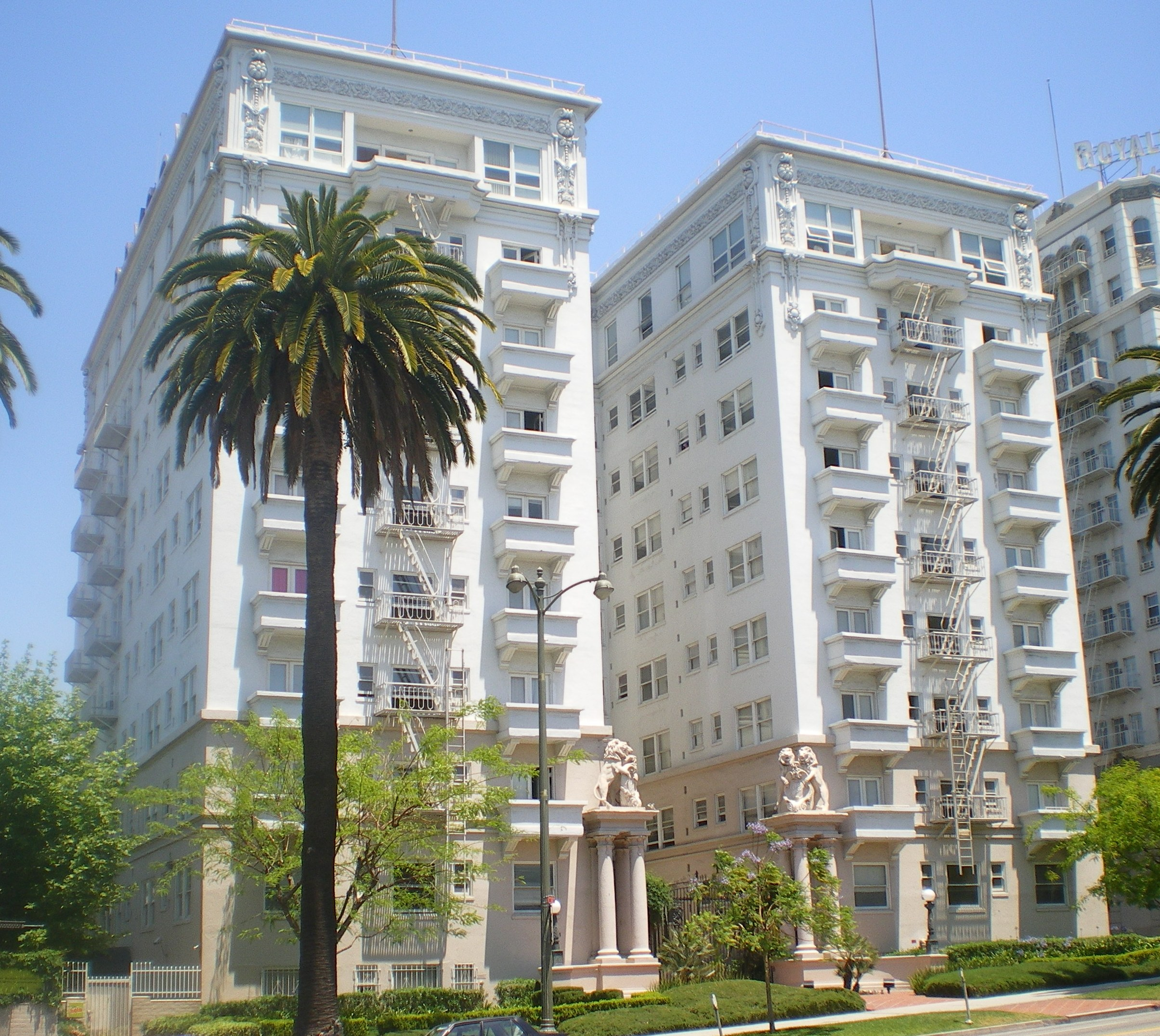
- Bryson Apartment Hotel, Spring 2008

- Location within the Los Angeles metropolitan area Location within California Location within the United States
- Location: 2701 Wilshire Blvd., Los Angeles, California
- Coordinates: 34°3′40″N 118°16′53″W
- Built: 1913
- Architect: Frederick Noonan & Charles H. Kysor
- Architectural style: Classical Revival, Beaux Arts
- NRHP reference No.: 83001184
- LAHCM No.: 653

Significant dates
- Added to NRHP: April 7, 1983
- Designated LAHCM: September 18, 1998

The Bryson Apartment Hotel is a historic 110,000-square-foot (10,000 m^{2}), ten-story apartment building on Wilshire Boulevard in the Westlake neighborhood of Los Angeles, California. Built in 1913 in the Beaux Arts style, it was one of the most luxurious residential buildings in Los Angeles for many years. The building is also closely associated with the city's film noir history, having been featured in Raymond Chandler's works and the 1990 neo-noir The Grifters. The building's stone lions and large rooftop "Bryson" sign have become Los Angeles landmarks. It was added to the National Register of Historic Places in 1983 and designated a Historic Cultural Monument (#653) by the Los Angeles Cultural Heritage Commission in 1998.

== Construction and architecture ==
The Bryson was built in 1913 by real estate developer, Hugh W. Bryson, along a stretch of Wilshire Boulevard that was considered to be the "West Side" and which was then principally a residential area. Bryson acquired the property in 1911, purchasing and razing four houses that occupied the space. He had originally intended to construct a six-story building flush with the sidewalks along Wilshire Boulevard and Rampart Street. When neighbors complained about his plans, Bryson chose instead to build a taller structure, but one set back 100 feet (30 m) from the centerlines of Wilshire Boulevard and Rampart Street. In March 1912, Bryson announced his revised plans: "It is my intention to make this apartment house in a class by itself on this coast and finer than any other west of New York City. To that end, I shall spare no expense."

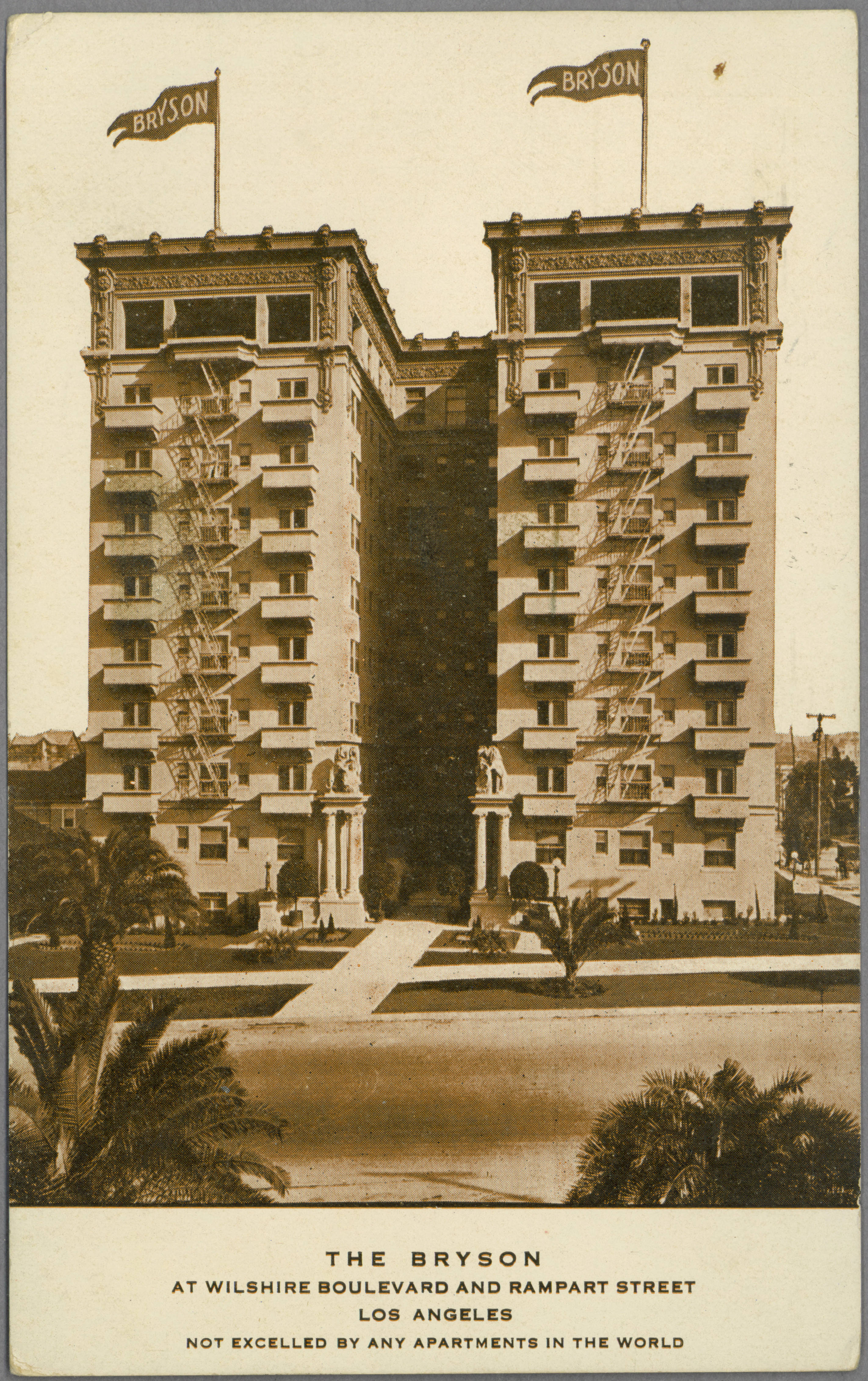
Postcard of The Bryson apartments at Wilshire Boulevard and Rampart Street in Los Angeles. "Not excelled by any apartments in the world" -- printed on front

Bryson hired architects Frederick Noonan and Charles H. Kysor to design the building. The construction was undertaken by Bryson's own company, F.C. Engstrum & Co. and completed in only seven months between June and December 1912. The total cost, including land, construction, and furniture, was approximately $750,000 ($25.0 million today).

The building combines Beaux Arts and Classical styles. The structure was built around a central court 26 feet (7.9 m) wide and 50 feet (15 m) deep. At the time of its opening, it had 320 rooms divided into 96 apartments, with a configuration allowing apartments to be connected to form suites with as many as 12 rooms. All four sides of the building "presented a finished appearance", each being "handsomely ornamented with vari-colored tiles and concrete moulding." The interior was finished with cut-glass chandeliers, Italian marble stairs and wainscotting, tile floors, and richly upholstered mahogany furniture. The top floor was dedicated to common use, with a ballroom, library, billiard-room and three enclosed loggias. Bryson reportedly spent $60,000 ($2.0 million today) for rugs, fine art, rare plants and furnishings for the top floor. Being located at an elevated spot in the city, and being the only high-rise in the area, the building's top floors offered panoramic views. A 1920s brochure for The Bryson touted the view:

It has three large loggias from which one can see the Pacific Ocean, Catalina Island 67 miles (108 km) away, on a clear day; green foothills, orange groves and snow-capped mountains.

Because of its 100-foot (30 m) setback, The Bryson was also able to make room for tennis courts and a wide lawn and gardens—though this has been reduced as the streets were widened in later years. One writer in the building's early days noted: "The landscaping of the place constitutes one of its principal charms."

== Operation as an apartment hotel ==
=== Early success ===
When the new building opened in January 1913, it was met with glowing praise. The Los Angeles Times called it "magnificent" and opined that it "is probably the finest apartment-house west of New York City, comparing favorably with the splendid apartment-houses and apartment-hotels in the Riverside drive district of Manhattan." When Bryson announced his plans, some thought Los Angeles was too small to support "an institution of this character," but the building proved to be a success. In fact, the building was fully occupied within two days of its opening. In 1915, the building was sold for $1.25 million ($39.8 million today), nearly 70% more than it had cost to build just three years earlier.

In its early years, The Bryson was reportedly a favorite location for the "beautiful people" of the day." It was the only high-rise and the dominant feature on Wilshire Boulevard for many years. It was not until 1921 that The Bryson was joined by the Ambassador Hotel on Wilshire, followed by The Gaylord in 1924, The Arcady in 1927 and Bullocks Wilshire in 1929.

=== Association with Raymond Chandler and film noir ===
Novelist Raymond Chandler added to The Bryson's landmark status when he featured it in his 1943 work The Lady in the Lake. Owing to its connection with Chandler, The Bryson has been described as one of the city's "high-rises that were meant to house wealthy transplants from back East but became the faded palaces of L.A. noir." In the novel, detective Philip Marlowe visited the Bryson Tower in pursuit of the title character. Chandler described the Bryson:

Twenty five minutes brought us to the Bryson Tower, a white stucco palace with fretted lanterns in the forecourt and tall date palms. The entrance was in an L, up marble steps, through a Moorish archway, and over a lobby that was too big and a carpet that was too blue. Blue Ali Baba oil jars were dotted around, big enough to keep tigers in. There was a desk and a night clerk with one of those moustaches that get stuck under your finger nail."

The Hollywood Chamber of Commerce reports that thousands of Chandler fans travel to Los Angeles to see the locations of Chandler's works, including the Bryson and the Montecito Apartments. In a 2007 article about Raymond Chandler's Los Angeles, one writer described the view of The Bryson, with "its enduring rooftop sign," as "a symbol of a cityscape that is rapidly disappearing"—the city "as it looked to Philip Marlowe, heading toward the Bryson Apartment Hotel for another rendezvous."

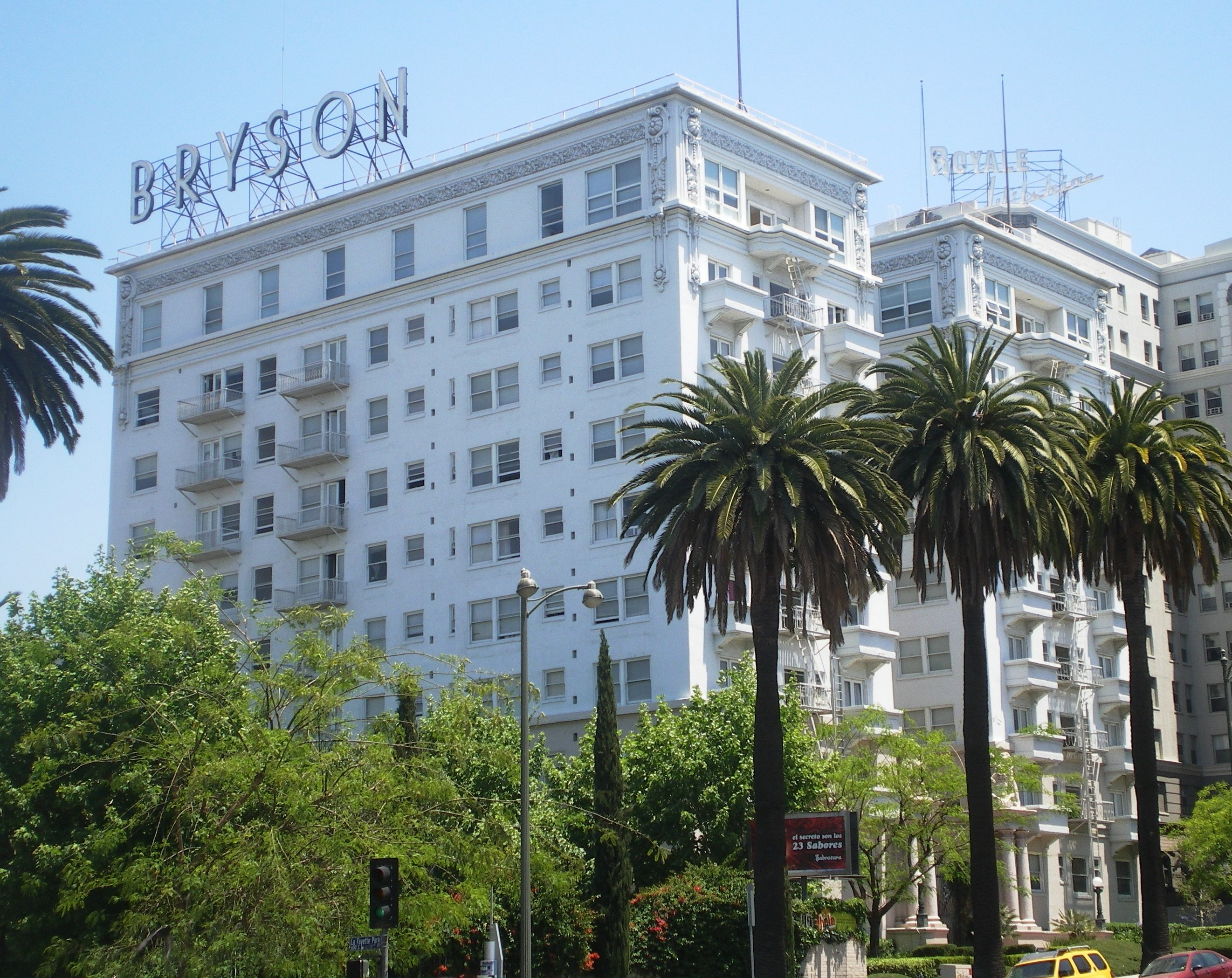

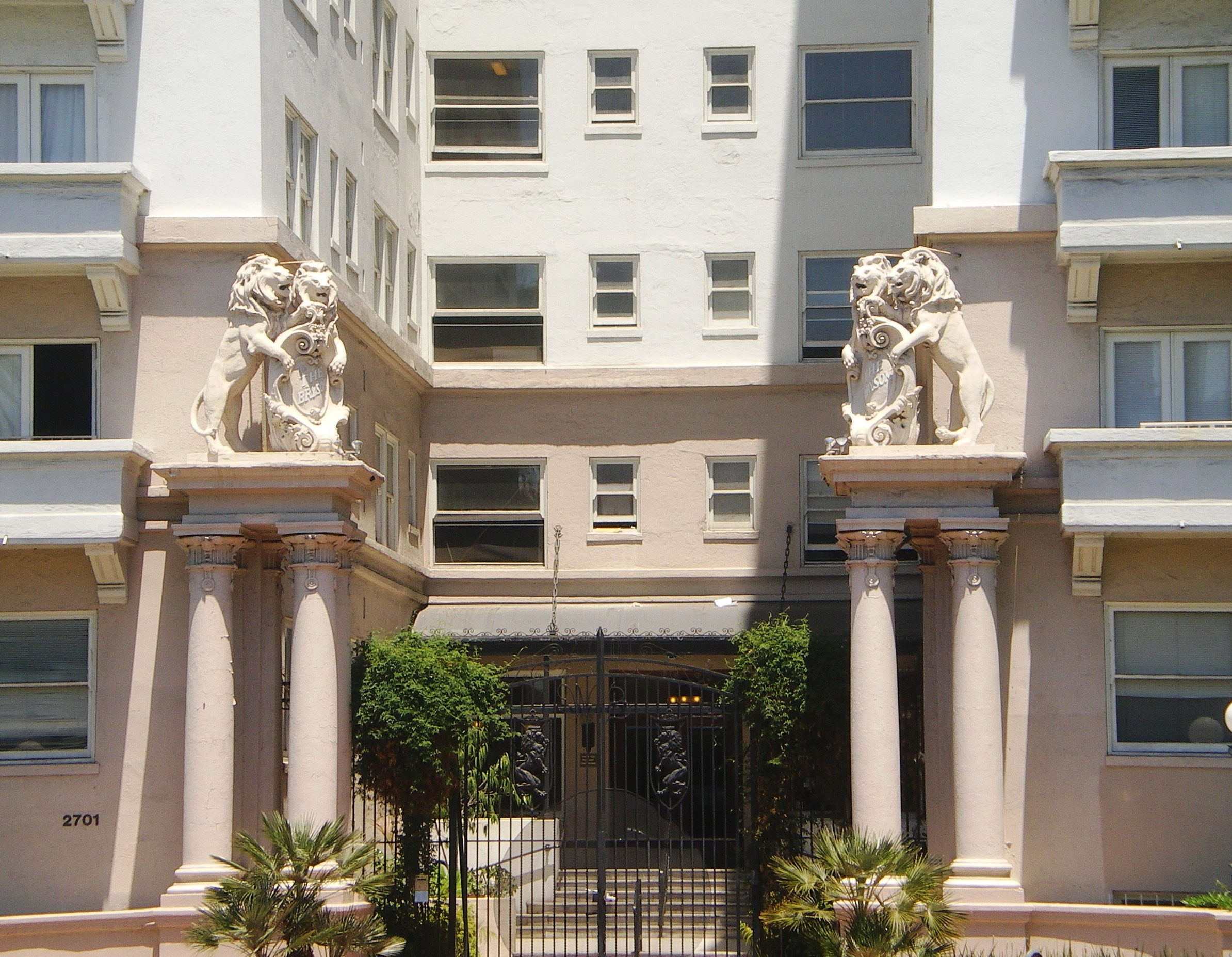
Top: View from west with "Bryson" sign atop the building
Bottom: Lions at front entrance to the Bryson

Chandler used The Bryson as a setting when he co-wrote the screenplay for the 1944 film noir classic Double Indemnity, which starred Fred MacMurray (see also next section). When Stephen Frears shot his 1990 neo-noir, The Grifters, he chose The Bryson Apartments as one of the principal locations, serving as the home of a main character and the site of the bloody climax.

=== Post-war years ===
In 1944, shortly after starring in the Bryson-located film Double Indemnity (see above), Fred MacMurray purchased The Bryson for $600,000 ($11.0 million today). MacMurray owned the building for approximately 30 years. By the late 1940s, as other parts of the city expanded, The Bryson began to lose some of its prestige. In 1949, MacMurray secured a reduction in the property tax assessment to $100,000 ($1.4 million today), arguing that high costs made the building unprofitable.

By the 1970s, as glitzier locations on the westside and in other areas became more popular, the shine was gone from The Bryson. In 1977, the Los Angeles Times reported that the 10th floor, formerly the building's showplace, had been stripped and was used only for storage.

In 1999, the building underwent a $5.5 million renovation ($10.6 million today). The project drew attention by dressing the building's landmark statues of the lions in hard hats and orange construction vests. The contractor noted: "It's become quite a conversation piece for people along Wilshire Boulevard."

== Historic designations ==
The Bryson was added to the National Register of Historic Places in 1983 and designated a Historic Cultural Monument (HCM #653) by the Los Angeles Cultural Heritage Commission in 1998. It is one of several Registered Historic Places encircling Lafayette Park, including the Granada Shoppes and Studios, The Town House, the Felipe De Neve Branch and Bullocks Wilshire one block to the west.

== See also ==
- National Register of Historic Places listings in Los Angeles
- List of Los Angeles Historic-Cultural Monuments in the Wilshire and Westlake areas
