= Fiesta Broadway =

Annual public celebration in Los Angeles, California

- Genre: Festival
- Frequency: Annual
- Location: Downtown Los Angeles
- Coordinates: 34°03′13″N 118°14′44″W
- Country: United States
- Years active: 36
- Established: 1990
- Previous event: 4-26-2026
- Next event: 4-25-2027

Fiesta Broadway is an annual event held in downtown Los Angeles to celebrate Cinco de Mayo, Mexican culture and Latin American culture in general. Modeled on Miami's Calle Ocho Festival and harking back to the early 20th-century Fiesta de Los Angeles, it features vendors and musical acts. At its peak, Fiesta Broadway stretched for 36 blocks centered on a long stretch of Broadway and attracted hundreds of thousands of visitors. More recently it has been confined to a few blocks around 1st Street and Broadway and has seen attendance shrink to as little as 7,000. Although the holiday of Cinco de Mayo falls on May 5, which is the meaning of its Spanish name, Fiesta Broadway is always held on the last Sunday in April, since 1995.

All Access Talent & Uno Productions produces the extravaganza.

== History ==
1990: The first L.A. Fiesta Broadway drew a crowd that was estimated at 500,000. This was the first large-scale attempt to celebrate Cinco de Mayo in Los Angeles. A partnership of city officials, KMEX-TV and downtown merchants paid for the $1 million festival, which was taped and telecast over the Spanish-language Univision Network.

1991: The second L.A. Fiesta Broadway cost $2 million and stretched over 36 blocks from Temple Street to Olympic Boulevard, along Hill Street, Broadway and Spring Street. The first year's festival had occupied only 12 blocks on Broadway.The array of performers included the Latin American sensation Xuxa, Lucha Villa, La Prieta Linda and jazz greats Tito Puente and Poncho Sanchez. Other entertainers representing 15 Latin American countries included Fandango, José José and Johnny Canales.

1992: An estimated 600,000 people turned out, attracted in part by a variety of musical acts on nine stages, including Menudo and Selena. Many corporations also sponsored booths at the event.

1994: The fifth L.A. Fiesta Broadway was shut down early by police after a rock and bottle throwing melee broke out. The immediate cause of the disturbance was the closure of the KPWR-FM (Power 106) stage due to overcrowding. The crowd was estimated at between 200,000 and 500,000. Only 10 people were arrested.

1995: Tightened security was brought in to prevent a recurrence of the previous year's violence. The headlining performer was Cuban salsa star Celia Cruz, who was joined by artists as varied as Thalia, La Mafia, Pedro Fernandez, Marc Anthony, and Rey Ruiz. There were complaints that Univision's annual taping of the festival for broadcast led to the use of lip syncing.

1996: Corporate sponsorship began to dominate what was now known as AT&T Fiesta Broadway. 105 companies participated, as opposed to 50 the previous year, paying $10,000 for a booth or $200,000 for a stage. Attendance declined, reaching only between 150,000 and 170,000.

2003: NBC4 (Los Angeles) aired a one-hour television special "Fiesta Broadway: Music for the Soul" directed at a mainstream audience. This was also McDonald's fourth year as title sponsor of the fiesta.

2010: The 21st Fiesta Broadway adopted a smaller street plan to reduce traffic, closing only 19 blocks.

2013: Fiesta Broadway contracted further to a cluster of streets around City Hall. Organisers expected attendance of around 100,000.

2015: While organisers continued to bill Fiesta Broadway as the largest Cinco de Mayo festival in the world, attendance dwindled to 7,000 according to police estimates. The festival's decline has been attributed to the gentrification of the neighborhood.

2020: Fiesta Broadway was to be in its 31st straight year. But the COVID-19 pandemic forced the Fiesta to go on hiatus over the next four years.

2024: The 31st annual event returned following the pandemic-based hiatus. Outdoor lucha libre (wrestling) was presented for the first time.
