= Widney Alumni House =

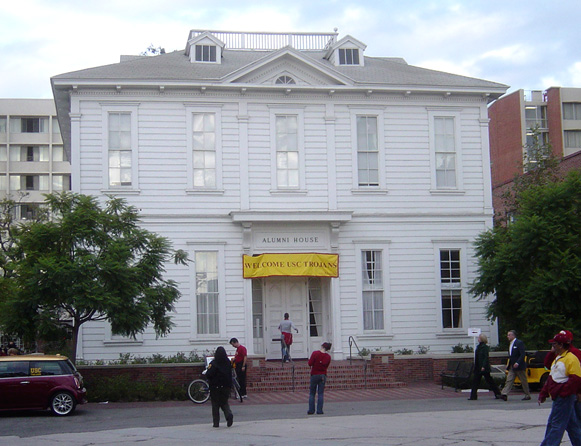
- Interactive map of Widney Alumni House
- 34.0196°N 118.2828°W
- Location: 650 Childs Way, Los Angeles

History
- Built: 1880

Site notes
- Architect: Kysor & Morgan
- Governing body: University of Southern California

California Historical Landmark
- Official name: Original Building of the University of Southern California
- Reference no.: 536

Los Angeles Historic-Cultural Monument
- Designated: December 16, 1970
- Reference no.: 70

Widney Alumni House is a Los Angeles Historic-Cultural Monument (No. 70) on the campus of the University of Southern California. It is the oldest university building in Southern California, having been in continuous use since 1880. Widney Alumni House has been designated as a California Historical Landmark (No. 536), as Original Building of the University of Southern California. The landmark plaque states,

Dedicated on September 4, 1880, this original building of the University of Southern California has been in use continuously for educational purposes since its doors were first opened to students on October 6, 1880, by the university's first president, Marion McKinley Bovard. The building was constructed on land donated by Ozro W. Childs, John G. Downey and Isaias W. Hellman under the guiding hand of Judge Robert M. Widney, the university's leading founder.

== See also ==
- List of Los Angeles Historic-Cultural Monuments in South Los Angeles
