= Ezra F. Kysor =

American architect

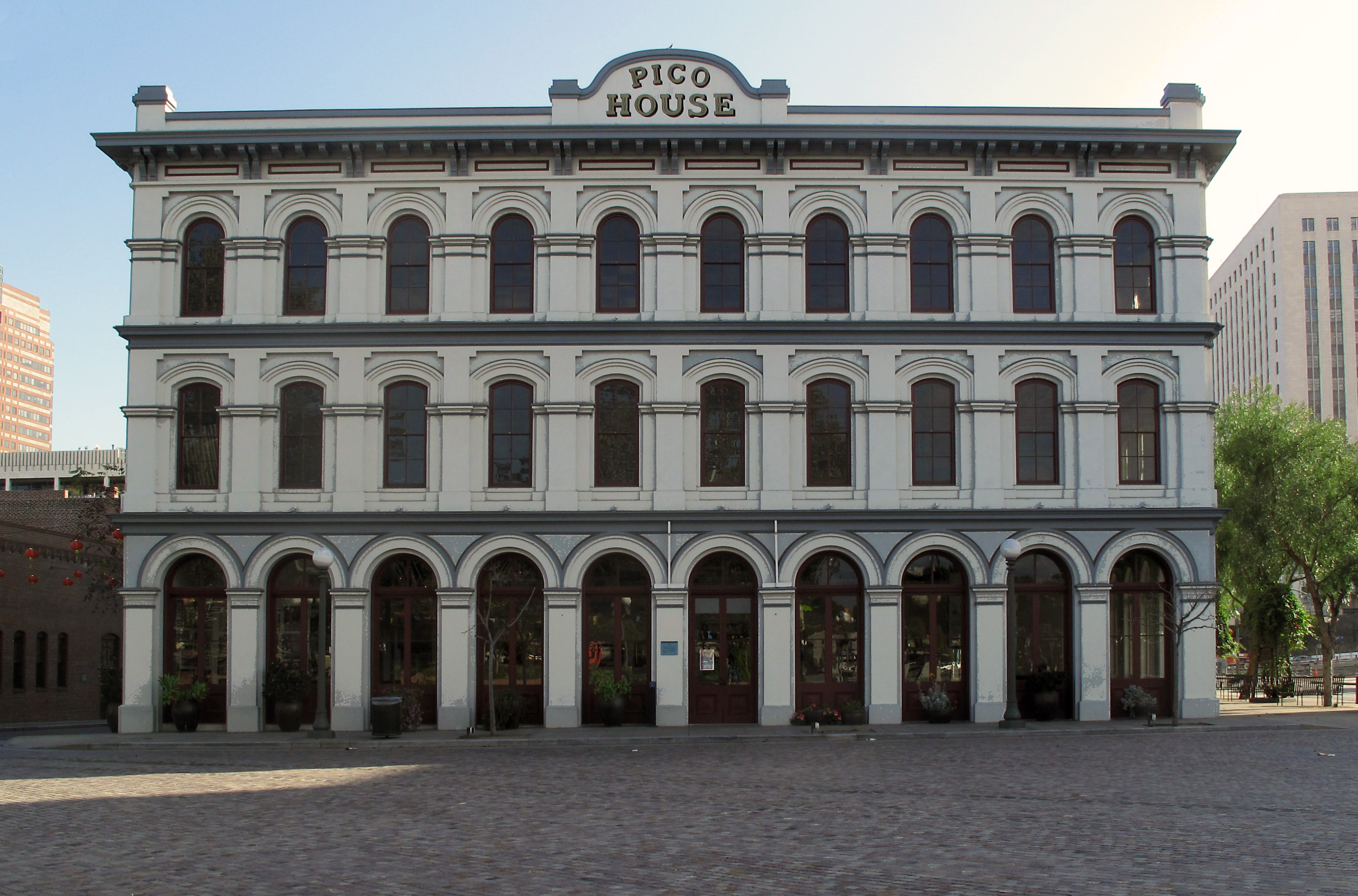
Pico House, Los Angeles, CA. 1869-70.

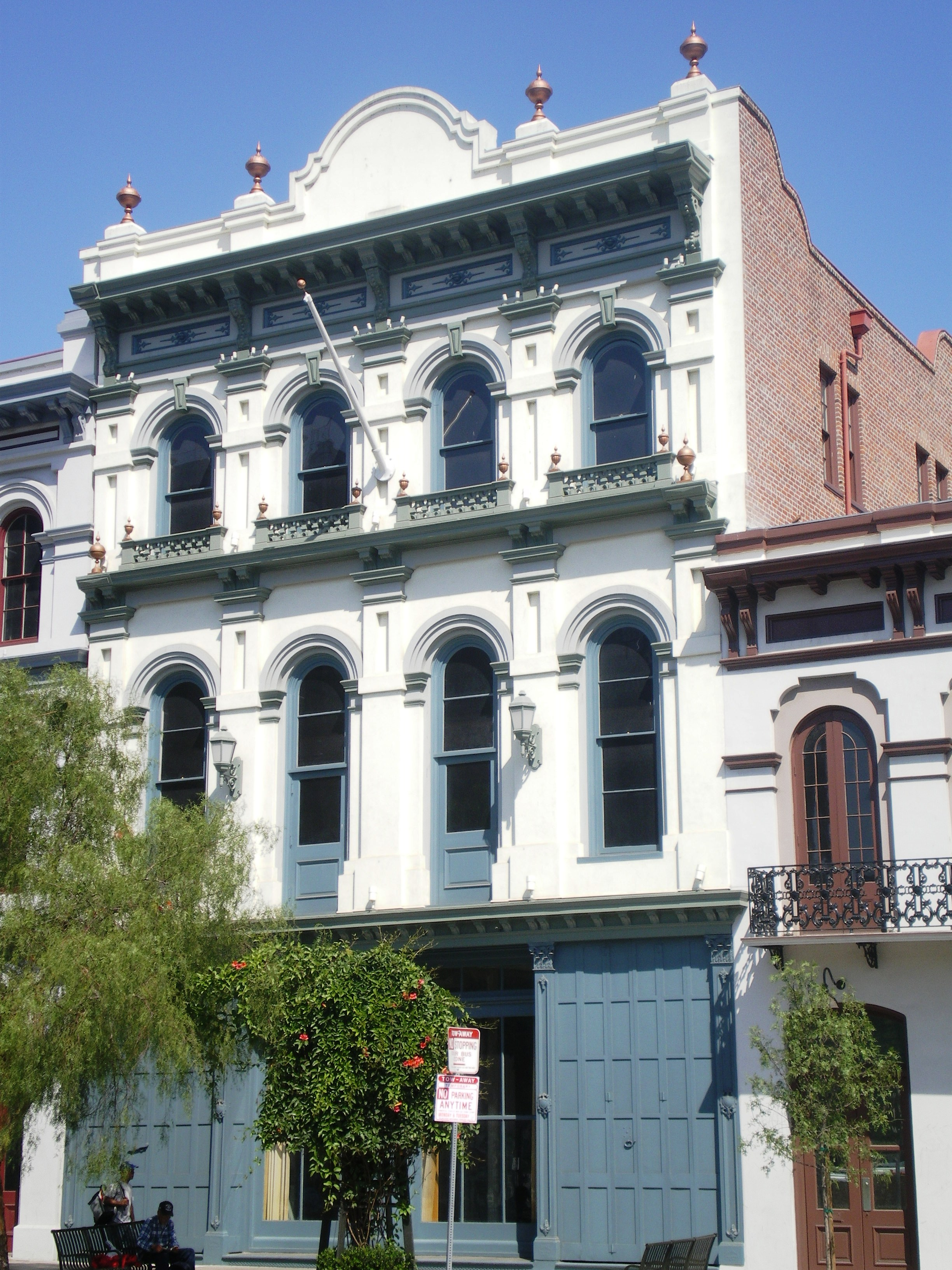
Merced Theatre, Los Angeles, CA. 1870.

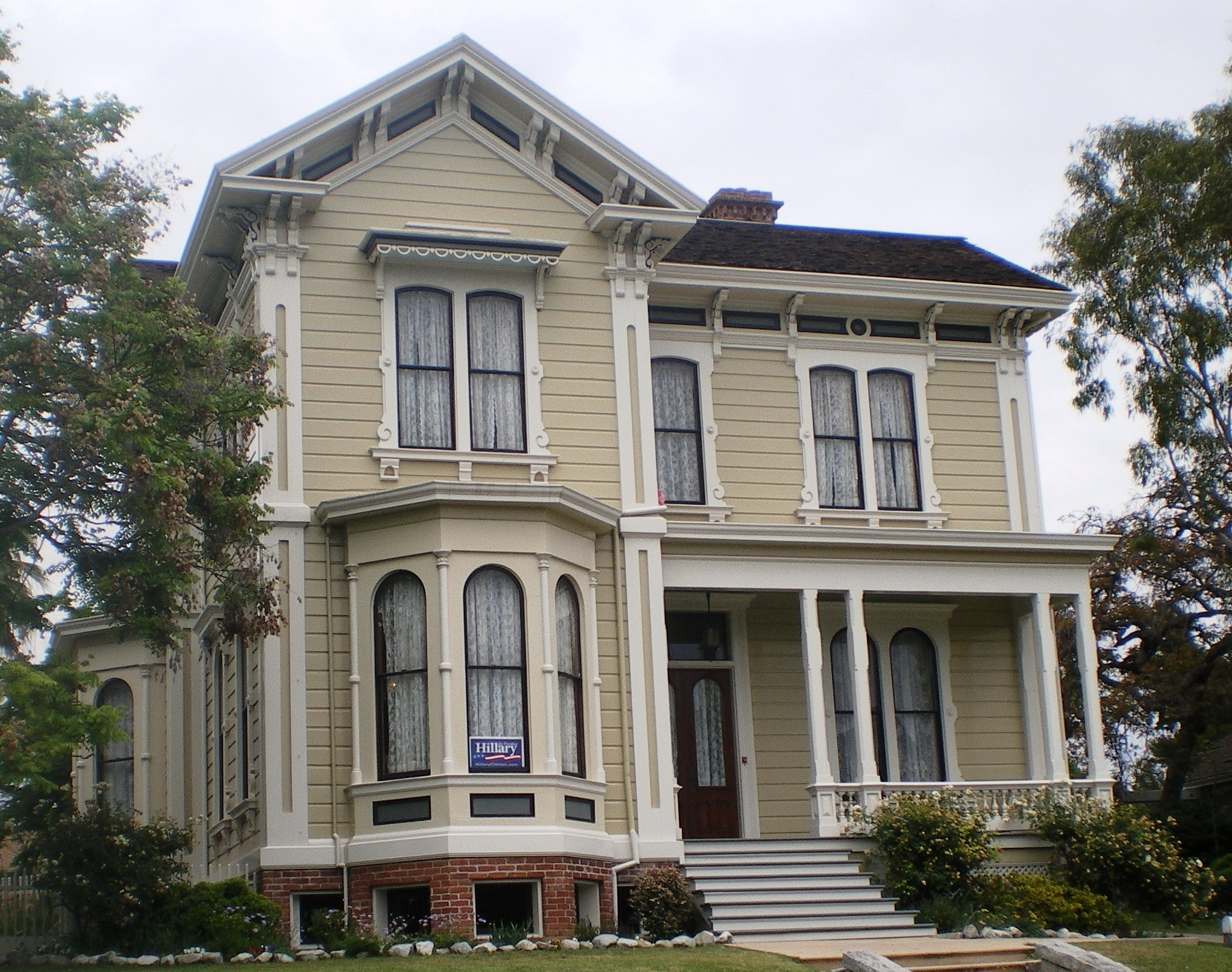
Samuel C. Foy House, Los Angeles, CA. 1872.

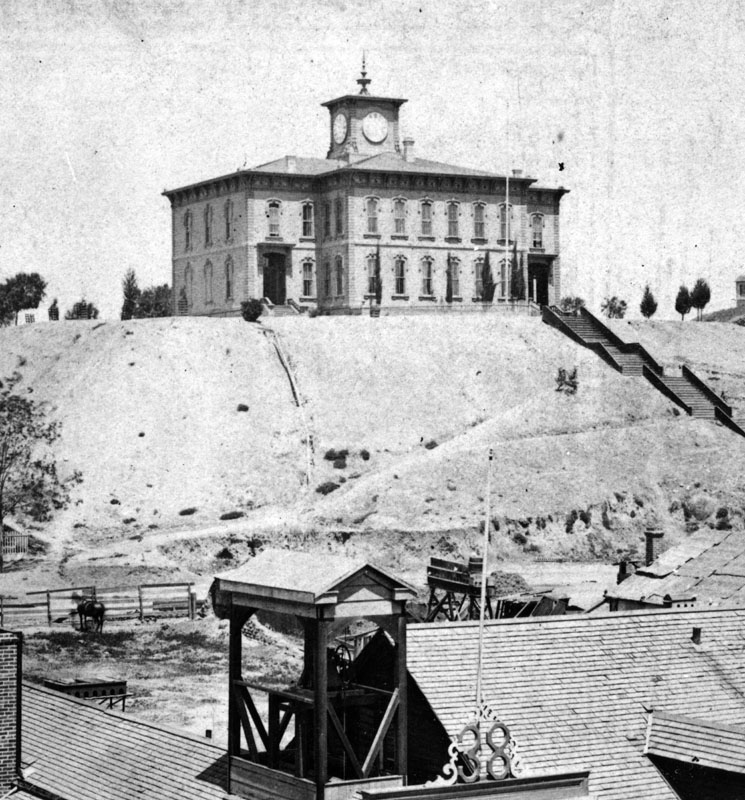
Los Angeles High School, Los Angeles, CA. 1872-73. Demolished.

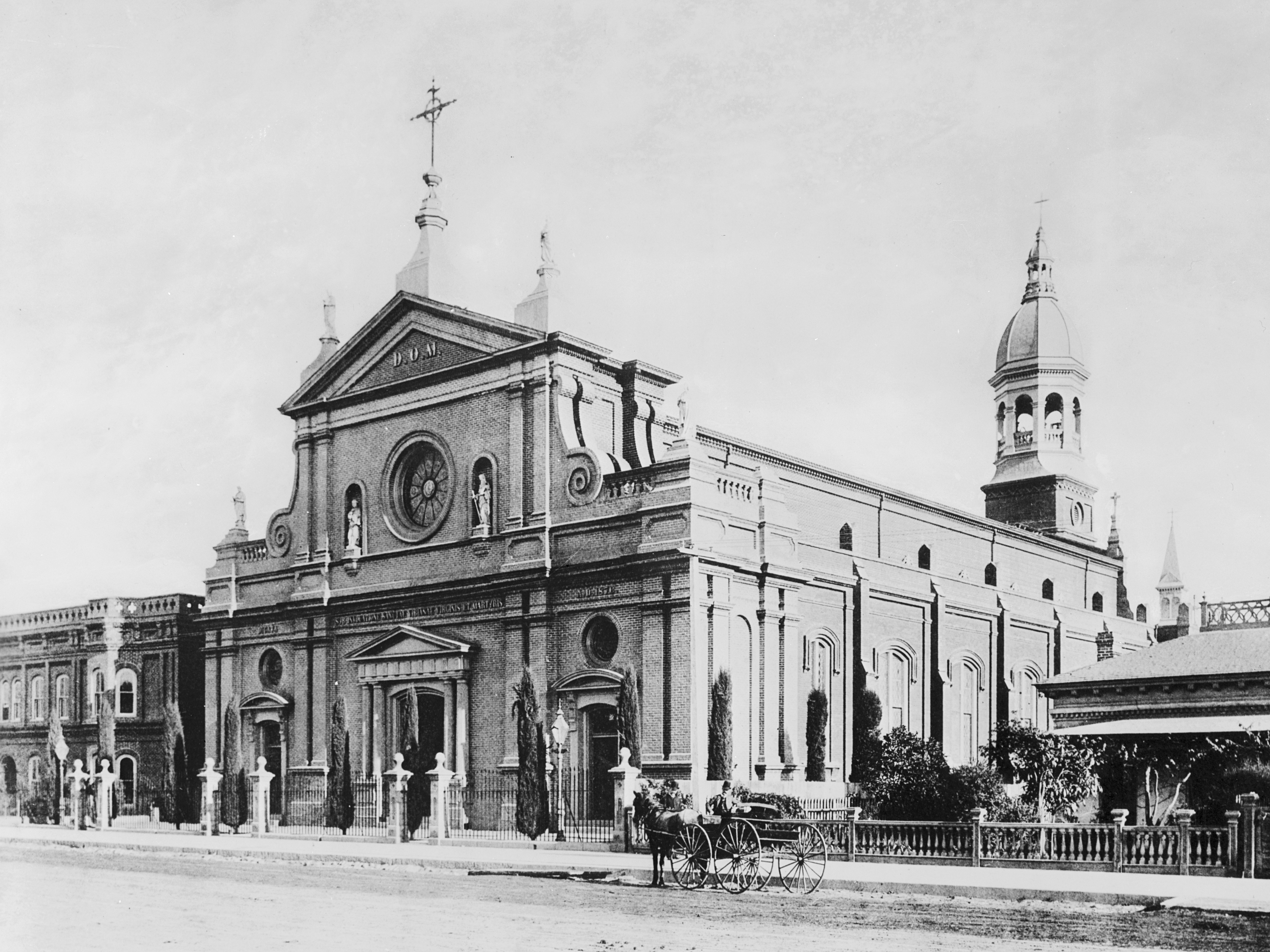
R. C. Cathedral of St. Vibiana, Los Angeles, CA. 1875-76. Altered.

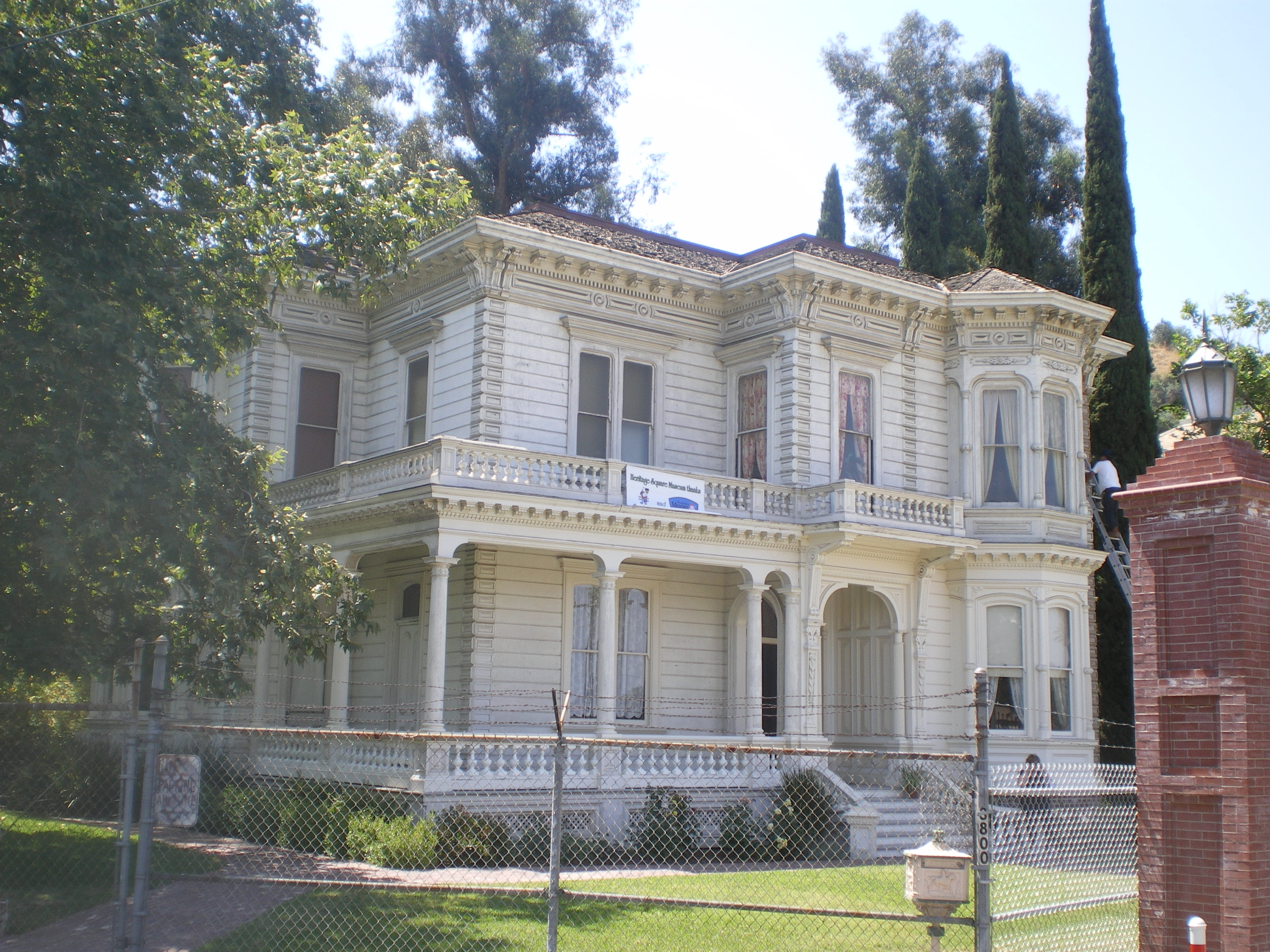
William H. Perry House, Los Angeles, CA. 1876.

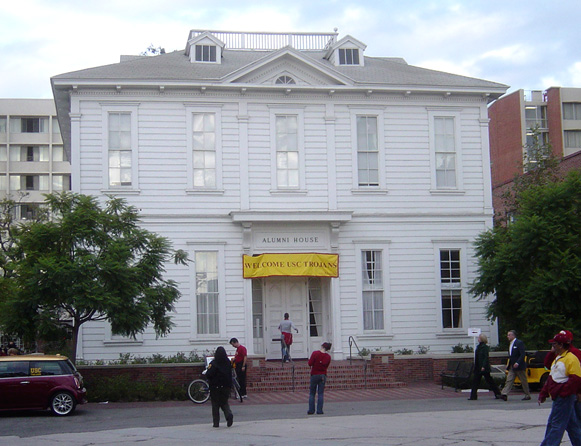
University Building, University of Southern California, Los Angeles, CA. 1880.

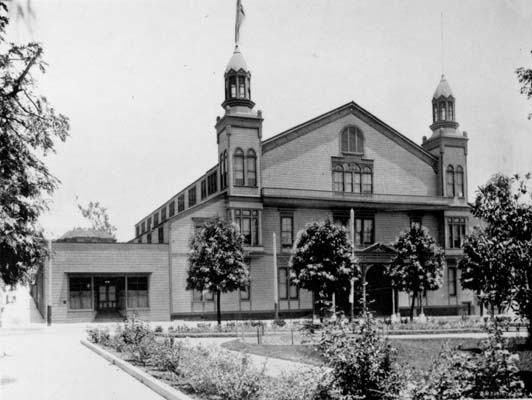
Hazard's Pavilion, Los Angeles, CA. 1887. Demolished.

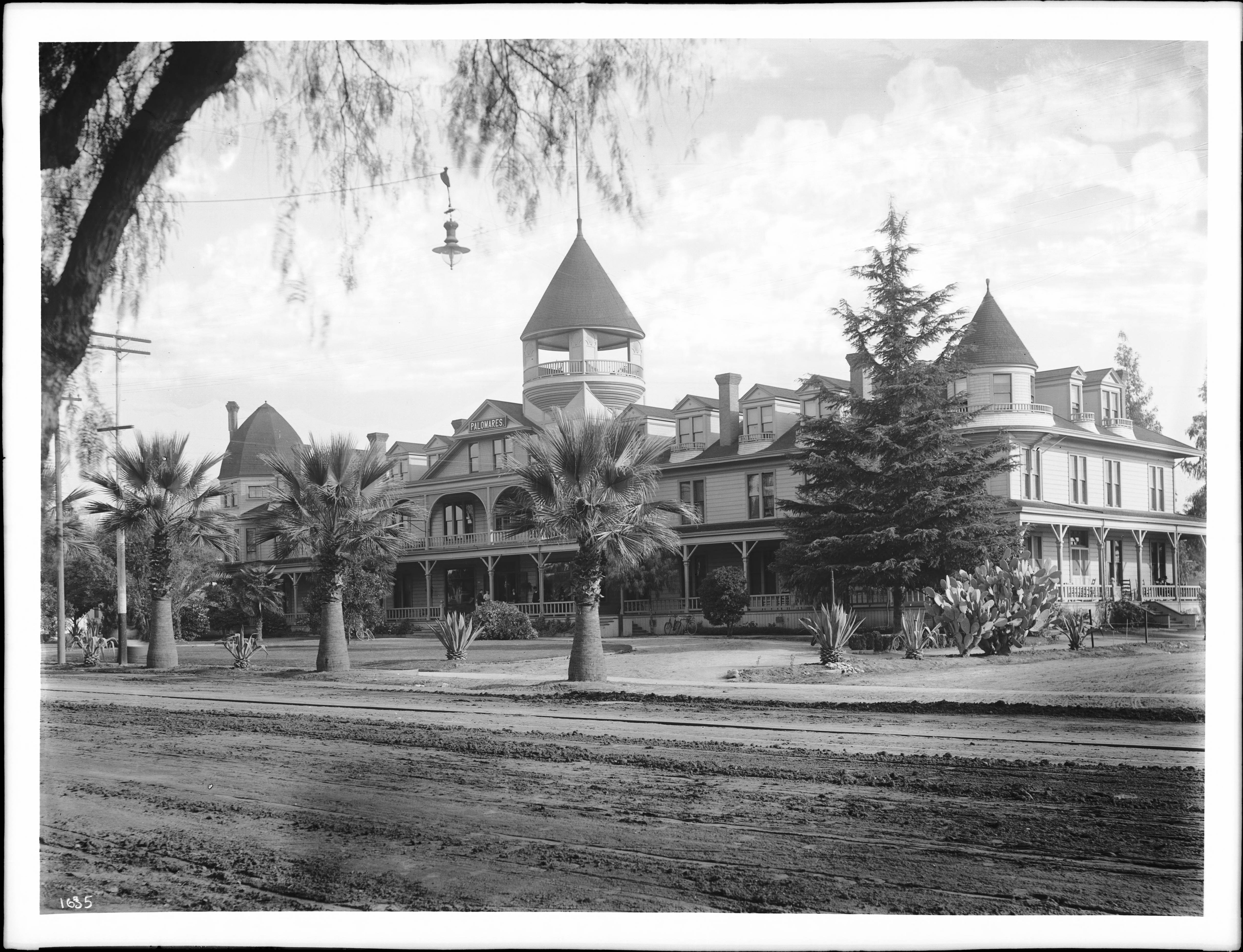
Palomares Hotel, Pomona, CA. 1887. Burned.

Ezra Frank Kysor (1835–1907) was an American architect from Los Angeles, California. He is believed to be the first professional architect to practice in Southern California.

== Biography ==
=== Early life ===
Ezra Kysor was born on August 6, 1835, in Cattaraugus, New York. Around the age of thirty, he traveled west to Virginia City, Nevada.

=== Career ===
Upon his arrival in Virginia City c.1865, Kysor established himself as a carpenter. He may also have maintained an architectural office. By 1868, however, he had settled in Los Angeles, California, as an architect.

He practiced alone until March 1875, when he established Kysor & Mathews with Walter J. Mathews (1850-1947). This firm was dissolved in April 1876. He was again alone until 1879, when John F. Hennessy (1853-1924) became a member of Kysor & Hennessy. Hennessy, who was born in Ireland and came to the United States in 1875 or 1876, left Los Angeles for Australia in late 1880.

Upon Hennessy's departure, Kysor made his chief draftsman, Octavius Morgan (1850-1922), a member of Kysor & Morgan. In 1886, John A. Walls (1858-1922) was added, the firm becoming Kysor, Morgan & Walls. It was around this time the Kysor began to withdraw from practice, to focus on real estate speculation. He retired from the firm completely in 1890, which became Morgan & Walls.

=== Personal life ===
He was married to Clara Perry. They had a son, Charles H. Kysor (1883-1954), who was also an architect.

== Architectural works ==
Notable Kysor works include (in Los Angeles, California unless otherwise noted):

=== Private practice ===
- Episcopal Church of Our Savior, San Gabriel (1869–71)
- Pico House (1869–70)
- Merced Theatre (1870)
- William Workman House remodel, City of Industry (1870)
- Congregation B'nai B'rith (1872–73, demolished)
- Samuel C. Foy House (1872)
- Los Angeles High School (1872–73, demolished)
- Ducommun Building (1874, demolished)
- Farmers and Merchants Bank of Los Angeles second building (1874, demolished)
- Harris Newmark House (1874, demolished)
- Joseph Mullally House (1876, demolished)
- Hellman & Mascarel Block (1878, demolished)

=== Kysor & Mathews ===
- Anaheim Hotel, Anaheim (1875, demolished)
- Cardona Block (1875, demolished)
- R. C. Cathedral of St. Vibiana (Completion) (1875–76)
- Herman W. Hellman House (1875, demolished)
- McDonald Block (1876, demolished)
- William H. Perry House (1876)

=== Kysor & Hennessy ===
- Horticultural Pavilion (1879, burned)

=== Kysor & Morgan ===
- University Building at the University of Southern California (1880)
- Garnier Block (1882–83)
- Hotel Nadeau (1882–83, demolished 1932)
- Grand Opera House (1883–84, demolished)
- First Baptist Church (1883–84, demolished)
- Placentia School, Anaheim (1884, demolished)
- Los Angeles Infirmary (1884, demolished)
- Trinity M. E. Church (1884, demolished)

=== Kysor, Morgan & Walls ===
- Law Building (1886, demolished)
- Los Angeles National Bank Building (1886–87, demolished)
- Abstract Title & Insurance Co. Building (1887, demolished)
- Granite Bank Building, Monrovia (1887, demolished)
- Hazard's Pavilion (1887, demolished 1905)
- Los Angeles Orphans' Home (1887, demolished)
- Palomares Hotel, Pomona (1887, burned 1911)
- Michael Sanders House (1887)
- Turn Halle (1887, demolished)
- Gates Building (1888, demolished)
- Frank Sabichi House (1888, demolished)
- Annex Building, California State Normal School (1889, demolished)
- Gymnasium, California State Normal School (1890, demolished)

== See also ==
- Central Business District, Los Angeles (1880-1899)
