= William H. Perry (businessman) =

American banker

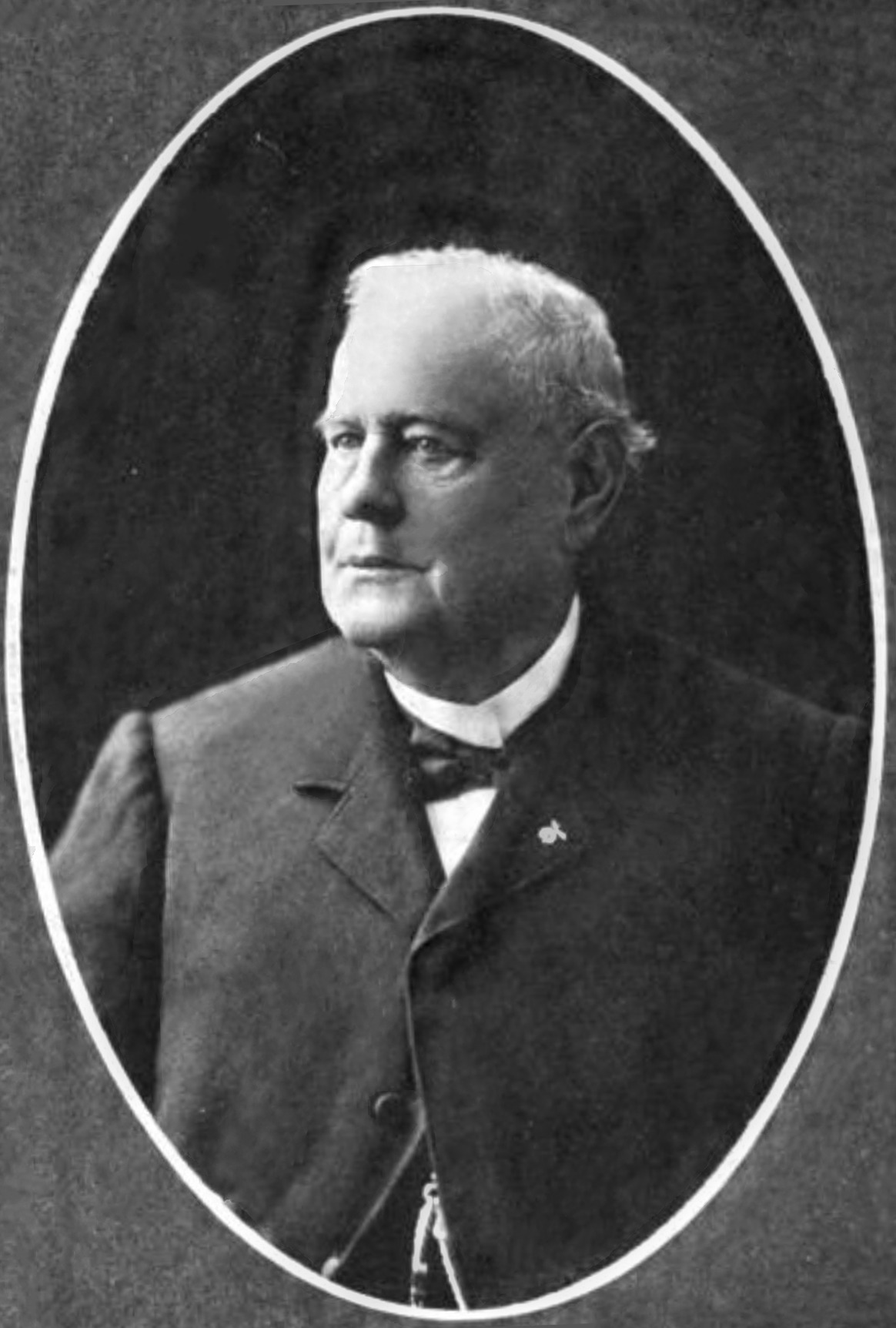
Perry

William Hayes Perry (1832–1906) was a 19th-century lumber merchant and financier in Los Angeles. He was known as "a masterful man whose influence and backing has been felt for fifty years in the development of Southern California."

== Personal ==
Perry was born on October 7, 1832, in Newark, Ohio, the son of John and Ann Perry. He went to school and learned a cabinetmaker's trade in Newark. At the age of twenty-one he made his way with William Welles Hollister and a party of some fifty men and five women, with a collection of cattle, sheep and horses, from Council Bluffs, Iowa, to Los Angeles by way of Salt Lake City and San Bernardino. It was the first transcontinental sheep drive, taking a year to complete.

He arrived in Los Angeles either in 1853 or February 1854. Perry later recounted that after his long trip he was "worn out, dead broke and almost naked." He walked into a store and asked the merchant for "the cheapest suit of clothes you have, and my face must be my security for payment until I get a start." The proprietor offered him two suits on credit — one for work and a more expensive one for church.

Perry was married to Elizabeth M. Dalton in 1858, and they had two daughters who survived him when he died on October 29, 1906 – Mamie Perry (Davis) Modini-Wood (Mrs. C. M. Wood) and Florence (Mrs. E. P. Johnson Jr.) and a son, Charles Frederic Perry.

The couple's youngest son, Eugene Ames Perry, had been sickly with a "long and tedious illness", and his parents took him to "the foremost physicians in New York, but they were unable to do him any good, and a later visit to leading San Francisco physicians was attended by no better success." He died December 18, 1887.

Perry died October 29, 1906. His widow, Elizabeth M. Perry, received half the community property, and Perry's will provided that on her death the estate should go to his children or their heirs. A son, Charles Frederic Perry, and his wife, Ada, adopted Marion Rebecca Perry, and after both Charles Frederic and Ada had died, 15-year-old Marion's claim for a share of the estate was contested by W.H. Perry's children, Mamie B. Modini-Wood and Florence Johnson. There being no law bearing on the case, a settlement was reached: Marion had asked for the sum of $318,740.95.

He was buried in Evergreen Cemetery after services at his residence, 20 St. James Park. William Mulholland was one of his pallbearers.

== Vocation ==
=== Lumber ===
==== Business ====
In less than a year after his arrival in Los Angeles, Perry opened the first furniture store in the city, selling some articles that he made himself and some that were shipped from San Francisco. He had no competition in the city for years, and partnered with James Brady, whom Wallace Woodworth bought out in 1858. In 1873 the firm opened a lumber yard and mill on Commercial Street. In its later expansion, the company purchased its own timberlands and organized lumber companies up and down the Pacific Coast and had logging camps, sawmills, vessels, wharves and spur tracks to railroads.

In 1858 Masonic Lodge 42 lent Perry, who was a Mason, and Brady enough money to construct a new building at 426 North Main Street for their "carpentry and furniture-making business", after which the lodge rented the second floor for its own use. The building, which has a symbolic "Masonic eye" below the parapet, is now part of the El Pueblo de Los Angeles Historical Monument.

==== Fire ====
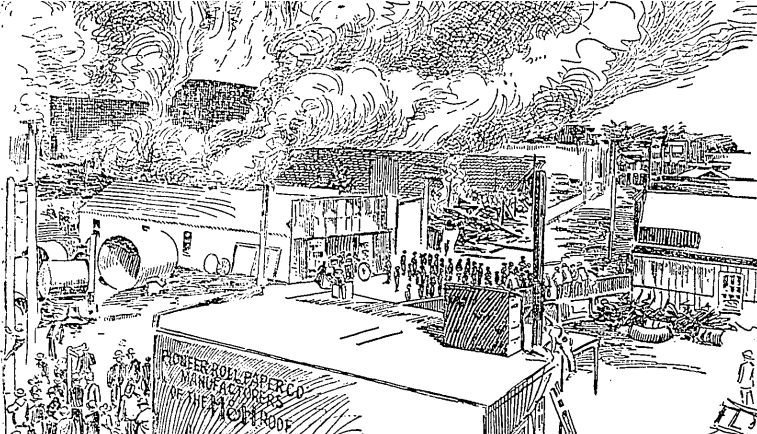
Fire destroyed the W.H. Perry lumber yard in 1899. This contemporary drawing in the Los Angeles Times was copied from a photograph.

On September 18, 1899, Perry's lumber yard was destroyed by a "Disastrous Fire in the Heart of a Busy Manufacturing District", as the headline in the Los Angeles Times put it the next day. It was. the Times said, "the most expensive, not to say the most disastrous, the city has ever experienced", with a loss estimated at between $200,000 to $250,000. Three men were killed in the blaze, which was fed by "Sawdust, shavings and other mill refuse."

The flames quickly spread to the Los Angeles Farming and Milling Company next door, which was leveled. "The heat thrown out by the burning grain was intense, and it was almost impossible for any one to get within a hundred feet of it." Firebrands from the conflagration were carried aloft by the wind, and dropped on rooftops east of Alameda Street almost as far as the Los Angeles River.

The firemen were greatly handicapped by the meager water supply. Most of the water pipes in the vicinity were laid thirty years ago, and the mains are only of four inches diameter. . . . The best hydrant in the district, the one at Alameda and Commercial streets, could not be utilized at first, on account of the intense heat from the burning flour mill. Engines were stationed at every available hydrant, however, and 13,000 feet of hose, of various kinds and qualities, some of it very bad, were laid. The hose burst frequently and caused the firemen much inconvenience.

=== Other ===
In 1885 Perry and others organized "a company for the first manufacture of gas in this city. . . . This firm imported and set in motion the first steam engine ever seen in Los Angeles." In 1879 he was elected director, president and manager of the Los Angeles City Water Company, serving until the city took over water service in 1902. He was also president of the Crystal Springs Land and Water Company and the Ventura Valley Water and Improvement Company.

It was said that Perry made the acquaintance of William Mulholland, who later became the noted general manager of the Los Angeles Department of Water and Power, when Perry rode by a ditch where Mulholland was clearing weeds and asked him what he was doing. "None of your damned business", Mulholland answered gruffly, without looking up.

After being told by a fellow worker that the man he had just spoken to was the company president, young William went to the main office to hand in his resignation. But the president, William Hayes Perry, was so impressed by Mulholland's attention to the job that he promoted him to foreman.

Perry was a shareholder in the Farmers and Merchants Bank of Los Angeles and in other banks, as well as in several oil companies.

By 1893 Perry was also the owner of the Los Angeles Theater on Spring Street. That same year he purchased the Turnverein Hall property on Spring Street for $100,000.

== Public service ==
Perry was elected to the Los Angeles Common Council, the governing body of the city, on December 7, 1868. The new councilmen drew lots for either a one- or a two-year term.

== Legacy ==
- The Mount Pleasant House was built in 1876 by Perry in Boyle Heights and later relocated to the Heritage Square Museum in the Montecito Heights area of Los Angeles.
- One of his children, Mamie Perry (1861–1949), studied voice in Italy, performed there to excellent reviews and, upon her permanent return to Los Angeles, became one of the public's favored sopranos.
- Hollywood and television actor Robert Stack (1919–2003) was a great-grandchild.
