= Fiesta de Los Angeles =

Festival in Downtown, Los Angeles

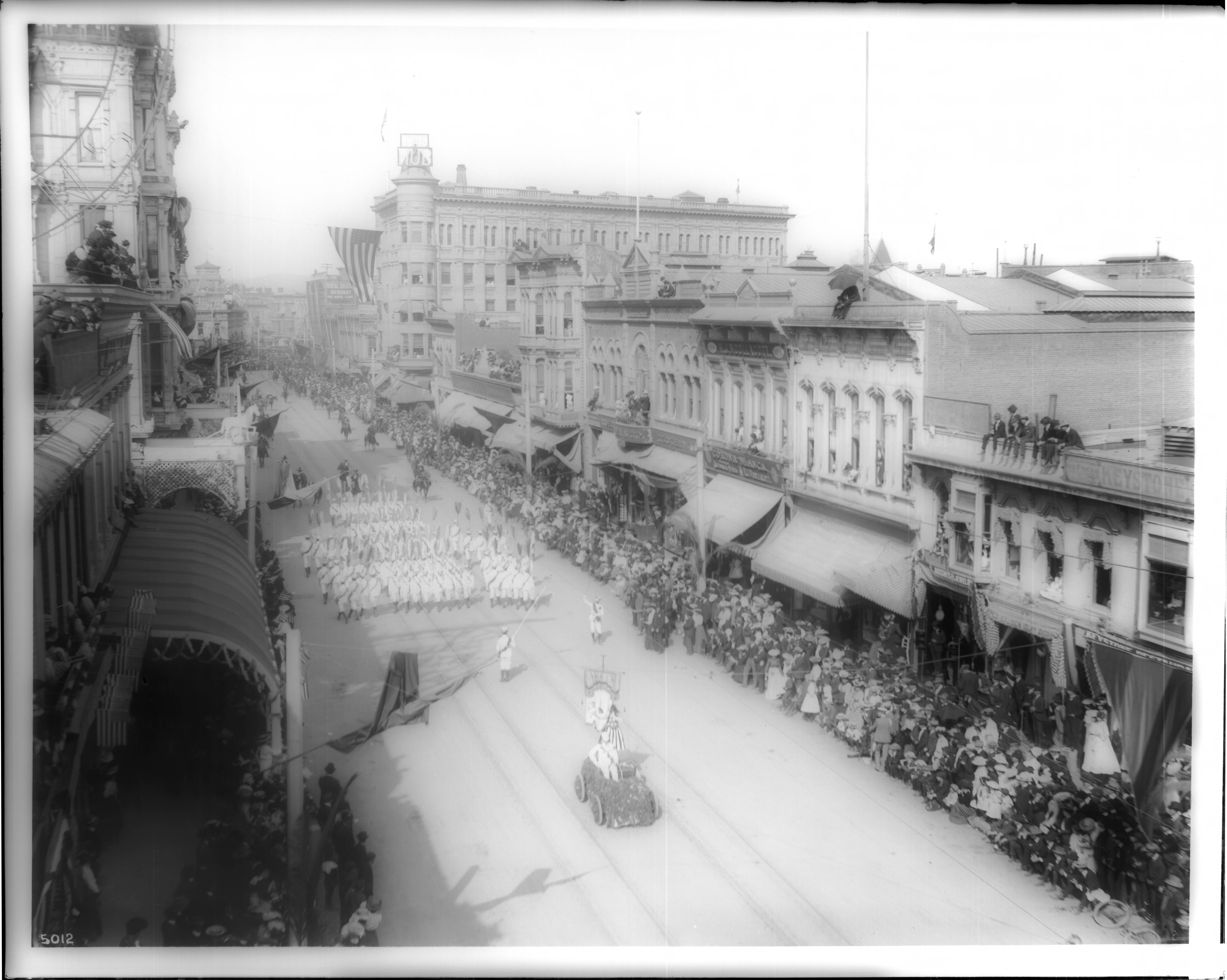
The 1903 Fiesta de Los Angeles parade

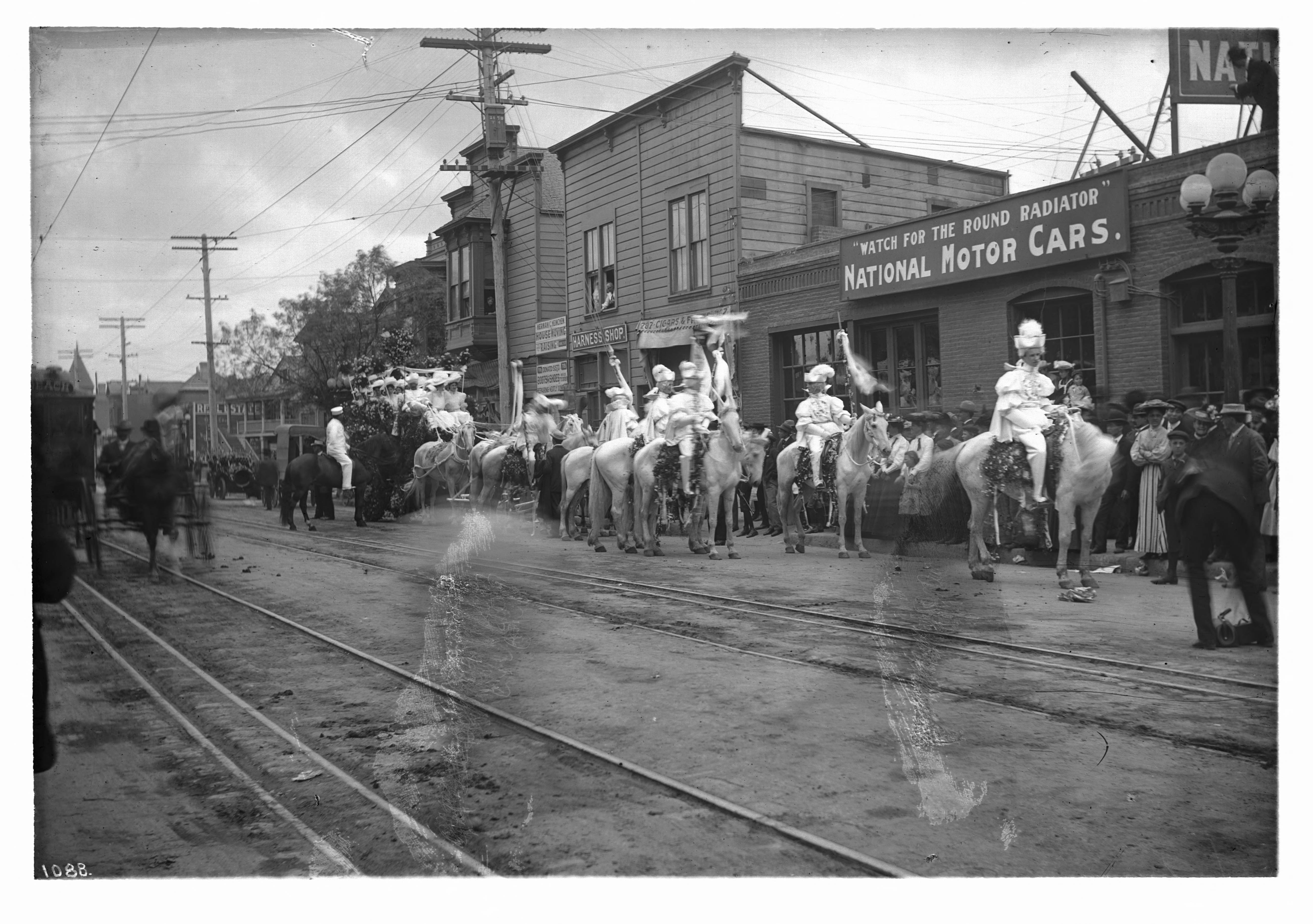
The 1906 Fiesta de Los Angeles parade

Fiesta de los Angeles was a parade and festival in Downtown Los Angeles that appeared yearly between 1894 and 1916. It originally featured a parade from the Old Plaza to Fiesta Park, and a multi-day festival that included events at Fiesta Park. The event was founded by local boosters, chief among them Max Meyberg, as an attempt to rival the Tournament of Roses in Pasadena, and the first parade was April 10, 1894. The 1901 festival was held in May to coincide with a visit by President William McKinley. There have been numerous attempts to revive the festival, most recently the Fiesta Broadway in the 1990s and 2000s.
