= Charles H. Kysor =

American architect

Charles H. Kysor (1883–1954) was an American architect.

== Early life ==
He was born in Los Angeles, California on May 17, 1883. His father was Ezra F. Kysor (1835–1907), a renowned architect, and his mother, Clara Perry. He changed his name during the First World War to avoid anti-German sentiment.

== Career ==
He designed the Bryson Apartment Hotel in Los Angeles alongside Frederick Noonan. He also built the Vernon, California branch of the Los Angeles Public Library in 1915 (3332), the Funk, Buel and Helen Muir House in Daggett, California, and the Santa Fe Warehouse Company Hotel, Los Angeles. Additionally, he worked with Charles H. Biggar in Bakersfield, California.

== Personal life ==
He was married to Barbara (Meiklejo) Kysor (1886–1960). They had a daughter, Francis Harleigh Kyson. He died of a heart attack on July 16, 1954, in Los Angeles.
