= Joseph W. Wolfskill and Louis Wolfskill =

American sibling politicians

Joseph W. Wolfskill (born 1844) and Louis Wolfskill (died 1884) were brothers who were members of the Los Angeles, California, Common Council, the legislative arm of that city's government, between 1874 and 1884. They were landowner successors to their pioneer Southern California father, William Wolfskill.

== Personal ==
The brothers were the sons of William Wolfskill of Richmond, Kentucky, and Magadalena Lugo or Rafaela Romero Lugo of Santa Barbara, California, Joseph being born on September 14, 1844, in Los Angeles. They were educated in the family home at Fourth and Alameda streets under the tutelage of H.B. Barrows. Their sisters were Mrs. Charles J. Shepherd, Mrs. Frank Sabichi, Alice (Mrs. H.D. Barrows, died 1863) and Rafaelita, who died as a child in 1855.

Joseph was married in San Francisco, California, to Ellen or Elena de Pedrorena of San Diego, California, and they had ten or eleven children, including Joseph W. Jr. (died June 1944), William F., David and John, who were educated at home. An infant son, Christian Reid, died on October 29, 1892, and a grown daughter, Francisco M., died in Redondo on January 8, 1894. The couple had houses and property in Riverside, Redondo and Los Angeles. Mrs. Wolfskill died four years before Joseph.

Louis was married in 1873 to Louisa Anna Dalton of Azusa, California, or of Los Angeles. He died on February 26, 1884, at Pasadena Highlands, Los Angeles County, California; his wife died at her residence in the City of Los Angeles on May 29, 1887; two daughters and four sons were left behind.

== Vocations ==
=== Joseph Wolfskill ===
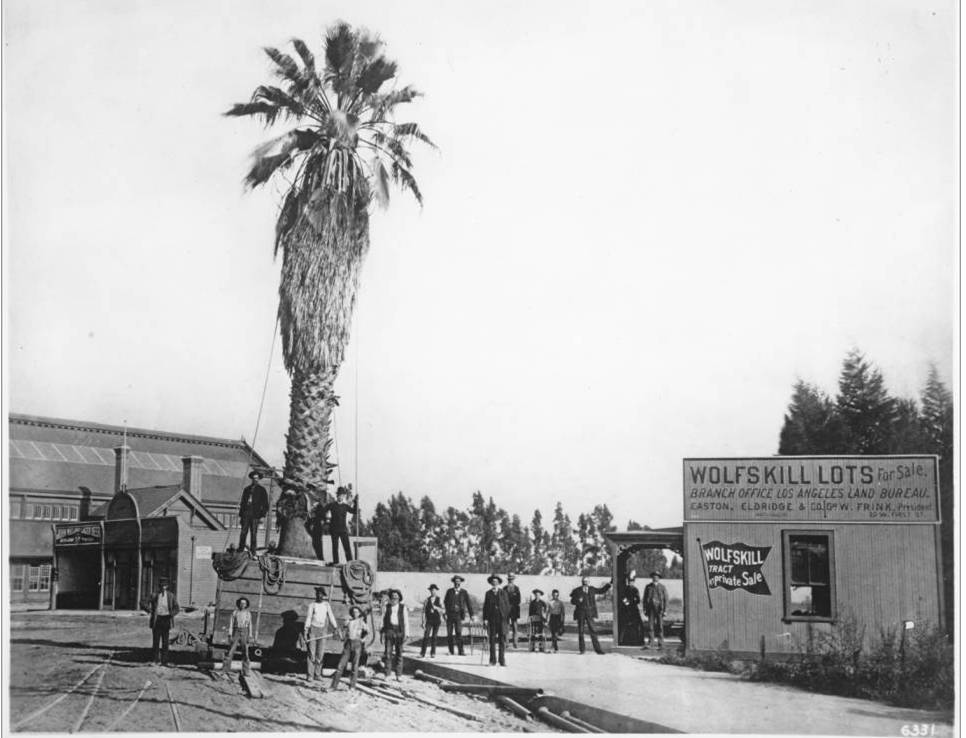
Wolfskill lots and Arcade Depot in 1890, just completed

Joseph Wolfskill was associated with his father in stock raising and citriculture, and on the death of his father in 1866, he took over the businesses. He "introduced scientific methods into the culture of oranges and extended the original Wolfskill grove until it was made to yield . . . the largest commercial crops in the Southland." The Wolfskill property in Los Angeles proper occupied the land later given over to the Arcade Depot. He had a nursery at the corner of Wabash and Zonal streets in Brooklyn Heights, Los Angeles, along with a retail store at 218 West Fourth Street in downtown L.A. An influx of white-scale insects from Australia devastated the orchards, and so Joseph Wolfskill divided the acreage and sold it piecemeal, in the meantime establishing an experimental station to devise a method of fighting the disease, including the use of "washes, sprays, gases, and latterly the parasites of the white scale[,] which have been brought from Australia."

=== Louis Wolfskill ===
When his father died in 1866, Louis Wolfskill took over the management of William Wolfskill's San Gabriel Valley properties, including Rancho San Antonio. Louis became a landowner whose estate at one time included property that later became the Los Angeles Arboretum. One subdivision became Chapman Woods, Pasadena, and Louis also owned Rancho San Francisquito, previously the property of his father-in-law, Henry Dalton.

== Public service ==
Louis Wolfskill was elected to represent the 3rd Ward on the Los Angeles Common Council on December 7, 1874, serving two one-year terms until December 6, 1876. Joseph, a Republican, was elected December 4, 1882, to represent the 4th Ward; he served until December 8, 1884. Joseph was foreman of the 1894 federal grand jury.

== Legacy ==
Joseph W. Wolfskill sold a lot between Central Avenue and Alameda street, on Fourth Street, where a refrigeration plant was to be built by the Ice and Cold Storage Company, of which J.G. McKinney was the president.
