= List of United States federal courthouses in Puerto Rico =

Following is a list of current and former courthouses of the United States federal court system located in Puerto Rico. Each entry indicates the name of the building along with an image, if available, its location and the jurisdiction it covers, the dates during which it was used for each such jurisdiction, and, if applicable the person for whom it was named, and the date of renaming. Dates of use will not necessarily correspond with the dates of construction or demolition of a building, as pre-existing structures may be adapted or court use, and former court buildings may later be put to other uses. Also, the official name of the building may be changed at some point after its use as a federal court building has been initiated.

== Courthouses ==
Courthouse	City	Image	Street address	Jurisdiction	Dates of use	Named for
Clemente Ruiz-Nazario U.S. Courthouse	Hato Rey		150 Carlos Chardon Street	D.P.R.	?–present	First Puerto Rico-born District Court judge Clemente Ruiz Nazario
Miguel Angel García Méndez Post Office Bldg^{†}	Mayagüez		McKinley and Pilar DeFillo Sts	D.P.R.	1937–present	Puerto Rican legislator Miguel A. García Méndez (2007)
Luis A. Ferre U.S. Courthouse & Post Office Bldg	Ponce		Atocha and Guadalupe Streets	D.P.R.	1933–2012	Governor Luis A. Ferré (2003)
Jose V. Toledo Federal Bldg & U.S. Courthouse^{†}	Old San Juan		Plaza de la Marina	D.P.R.	1914–present	District Court judge Jose Victor Toledo (1999)
Luis A. Ferré Courtroom - Southwestern Divisional Office	Ponce		AMCS Building, Suite 222 A 880 Tito Castro Avenue	D.P.R.	2013–present	Governor Luis A. Ferré (2013)

== Key ==
^{†}	Listed on the National Register of Historic Places (NRHP)
^{††}	NRHP-listed and also designated as a National Historic Landmark
