= Jay A. García-Gregory =

Puerto Rican judge (born 1944)

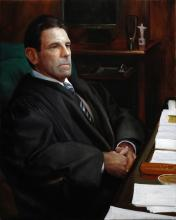

Senior Judge of the United States District Court for the District of Puerto Rico
- Incumbent
- Assumed office September 30, 2018

Judge of the United States District Court for the District of Puerto Rico
- In office July 11, 2000 – September 30, 2018
- Appointed by: Bill Clinton
- Preceded by: Raymond L. Acosta
- Succeeded by: Silvia Carreño-Coll

Personal details
- Born: 1944 (age 81–82) San Juan, Puerto Rico
- Education: Assumption College (AB); Complutense University of Madrid (MA); University of Puerto Rico School of Law (LLB)

Jay Alonso De La Torre García-Gregory (born in 1944) is a senior United States district judge of the United States District Court for the District of Puerto Rico.

== Education and career ==
Born in San Juan, Puerto Rico, García-Gregory received an Artium Baccalaureus degree from Assumption College in 1966, a Master of Arts from the University of Madrid in 1969, and a Bachelor of Laws from the University of Puerto Rico School of Law in 1972. He was a law clerk for Judge Hiram Rafael Cancio and Judge José Victor Toledo of the United States District Court for the District of Puerto Rico from 1973 to 1974. He was in private practice in Puerto Rico from 1974 to 2000.

== Federal judicial service ==
On April 5, 2000, García-Gregory was nominated by President Bill Clinton to a seat on the United States District Court for the District of Puerto Rico vacated by Raymond L. Acosta. García-Gregory was confirmed by the United States Senate on June 16, 2000, and received his commission on July 11, 2000. He assumed senior status on September 30, 2018.

== See also ==
- List of Hispanic and Latino American jurists

== Sources ==
Legal offices
Preceded by Raymond L. Acosta	Judge of the United States District Court for the District of Puerto Rico; 2000–2018	Succeeded by Silvia Carreño-Coll
