= Dupont Plaza Hotel arson =

1986 fire in San Juan, Puerto Rico

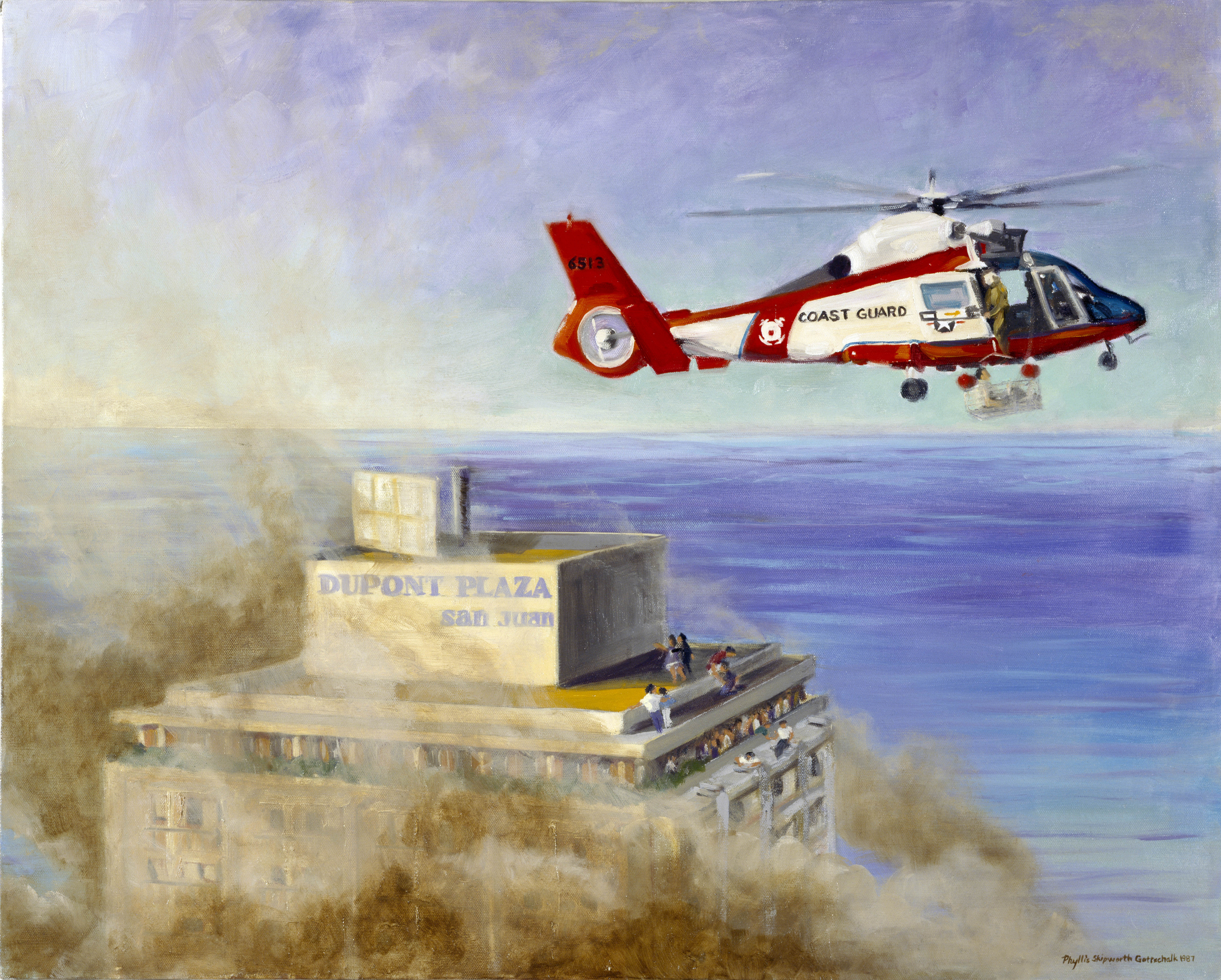
- A painting of a Coast Guard helicopter rescuing victims from roof of the Dupont Plaza during the fire
- Date: December 31, 1986; 39 years ago
- Time: 3:30 p.m.
- Venue: Hotel Dupont Plaza
- Location: San Juan, Puerto Rico; 18°27′22″N 66°4′13″W
- Type: Fire
- Cause: Arson
- Deaths: 96+
- Injuries: 140
- Convicted: Héctor Escudero, Armando Jiménez, and José Rivera
- Convictions: Murder
- Sentence: Jiménez: 75 years in prison Escudero, Rivera: 99 years in prison

On New Year's Eve, December 31, 1986, three disgruntled employees of the Dupont Plaza Hotel (now San Juan Marriott Resort & Stellaris Casino) in San Juan, Puerto Rico, intentionally set a fire. The employees (Héctor Escudero, Armando Jiménez, and José Rivera) were involved in a labor dispute with the owners. The fire killed between 96 and 98 people and injured 140 others. It is the most catastrophic hotel fire in Puerto Rican history and the second deadliest hotel fire in U.S. territory in history, after the Winecoff Hotel fire in Atlanta in 1946. This fire and other incidents of its kind gave rise to amendments to security policies to be implemented at hotels around the world.

== Hotel history ==
The Dupont Plaza Hotel opened in 1963 as the Puerto Rico-Sheraton and was operated by the Sheraton hotel company until 1980, just before Sheraton imposed significant fire-safety measures in its hotels through the world in 1981. Before national fire safety requirements were enacted in 1990, most hotels implemented fire safety measures based on local regulations and ordinances, which in some localities were lax, despite frequent fires and fire-related deaths at American hotels. In 1985, there were 7,500 reported fires in hotels and motels across the U.S., with 85 deaths and $56 million in damages (equivalent to $136 million in 2024).

In June 1985, the Dupont Plaza was inspected by the local fire department and was found to have deficiencies in its safety systems, including malfunctioning equipment and lack of evacuation and emergency plans. The fire sprinkler system, which was not criticized in the fire department's report, was not automated, as it was in 95% of hotels across the U.S. at that time.

== Fire ==
=== Background ===
The employees of the hotel were engaged in a labor dispute with hotel management; negotiations between the hotel and the employees' union, Local 901 of the International Brotherhood of Teamsters, began in October 1986. The union represented 250 of the hotel's 450 employees. One main issue in the dispute was an alleged plan by management to terminate sixty union members from employment and replace them with non-union employees. In the week the fire occurred, there had been three smaller fires at the hotel: one in a linen closet, one in a pile of cardboard boxes, and another in a roll of carpeting. Management then added thirty more security guards. Tension between management and employees became so great that desk clerks, taxi drivers, and local food stand employees were advising tourists to stay away from the hotel and its casino. One week after the fire, the governor of Puerto Rico, Rafael Hernández Colón, stated that, according to preliminary reports, in the days before the fire "information was going around that something was going to happen".

=== Disaster ===
The union called a meeting in the hotel's ballroom for the afternoon of December 31, 1986. At the conclusion of the meeting around 3:00 pm, the 125 members present voted to strike starting at midnight. At the time, the hotel was estimated to be at near-peak occupancy, with 900 to 1,000 guests.

Three union members—Héctor Escudero Aponte, José Rivera López, and Arnaldo Jiménez Rivera—planned to set several fires to scare tourists who wanted to stay at the hotel. At around 3:30 pm, they placed opened cans of chafing fuel in a storage room filled with newly purchased furniture, adjacent to the ballroom on the ground floor. While some labor organizers created a distraction by staging a fight just outside the doors to the ballroom, the three men set the fuel alight. The fire ignited the furniture and quickly burned out of control, growing to massive proportions and flashing over.

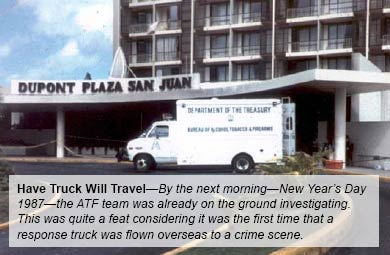
The ATF brought an investigation truck by air to the scene

After flashing over in the ballroom (which witnesses confused with an explosion), the hot gases swept up the grand staircase into the lobby of the hotel. From there, the fire was drawn through the open doors of the casino by smoke-eaters (devices in the ceiling that sucked cigarette smoke from the room) present through the casino. With more than 150 guests estimated in the casino when the fire started, most of the deaths occurred in that area. Several months before the fire, hotel management had the emergency exit doors locked to prevent theft, and the only other exit was through a pair of inward-opening doors. Some people pressed against the doors to no avail. Others leaped from the second-story casino through plate-glass windows to the pool deck below; many were injured. Others died of smoke inhalation on upper floors of the casino. Still others were killed as they rode elevators to the lobby only to discover their path blocked by the fire when the doors opened.

Those who could do so climbed to the hotel's roof, where an improvised helicopter rescue, including civilian, police, Puerto Rico National Guard, U.S. Coast Guard, and U.S. Navy helicopters from the Roosevelt Roads Naval Air Station, transported people to safety. Survivor Nancy Brensson was one of those rescued by helicopter:

We got to the eighth floor, but then there were people blocked by smoke. We ran to another stairway, and got down to the eighth floor again before we ran into the smoke ... [Near the roof] [h]elicopters circled around us, but it looked like they were afraid to land. Finally, one hovered about two feet above the roof. A co-pilot reached his hand out and pulled us to a step under the door. It looked like there was room in the back of the helicopter for two people. We squeezed five in.

The Puerto Rico Fire Department was dispatched at around 3:40 pm and thirteen firetrucks, 100 firefighters, and 35 ambulances responded. Firefighters extinguished the flames three hours later, although black smoke continued through the night.

== Casualties ==
The total number of deaths from the fire was at least 96, mostly by burns, and 140 people were injured; some sources give a death toll of 97 or 98. Most of the victims were burned beyond recognition and their belongings destroyed. In total, 84 bodies were found in the casino, five in the lobby, three in an elevator, and two at a pool-side bar outside the hotel.

== Aftermath ==
=== Investigation and lawsuits ===
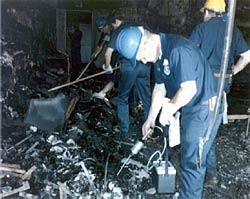
ATF agents sifting through the rubble of the Dupont Plaza Hotel

A U.S. Occupational Safety and Health Administration investigation revealed 25 safety violations, including a lack of emergency exit doors in the casino area, leading to the deaths of 84 trapped guests. Agents from the FBI's San Juan field office worked closely with the Bureau of Alcohol, Tobacco, Firearms and Explosives (ATF) to identify suspects and build cases against them. The union denied that it or any of its members were involved in starting the fire, and offered a $15,000 reward for information that helped the investigation.

In April 1987, union members Héctor Escudero Aponte, 35; Armando Jiménez Rivera, 29; and José Francisco Rivera López, 40, pleaded guilty to setting the fire. Rivera López had urged the other two men to start the fire and gave a Sterno can provided by Jiménez Rivera to Escudero Aponte, who in turn placed and lit the Sterno can under furniture stored in the ballroom. Escudero Aponte intended to start only a small fire.

The three men were convicted of murder and prosecutors requested Rivera López be sentenced to 25 years in prison and Jiménez Rivera to 24 years. The judge rejected the prosecutor's recommendation, sentencing Escudero Aponte and Rivera López both to 99 years in prison and Jiménez Rivera to 75 years. Jiménez Rivera and Rivera López were released from federal prison in 2001 and 2002, respectively. Escudero Aponte was released in 2017.

U.S. law firms whose past liability cases included the MGM Grand Hotel fire in Las Vegas and a Stouffer's Inn fire in New York State sent attorneys to represent fire victims. Ultimately, 2,300 plaintiffs filed 264 separate lawsuits against 230 defendants, seeking a total of $1.8 billion in damages. These were consolidated in the United States District Court for the District of Puerto Rico in San Juan. The Court of Appeals for the First Circuit referred to the consolidated lawsuit as a "litigatory monster".

Raymond L. Acosta, assigned as trial judge for the claims, divided the trial into phases, for which representative plaintiffs were selected. The first phase, against the so-called DuPont family defendants, which included the corporation that owned the hotel and some forty limited partnerships, corporations, and individuals who the plaintiffs claimed controlled the hotel, went to trial on March 15, 1989. This phase was settled on May 11, 1989, for between $85 million and $100 million.

The second phase, against 107 defendants consisting of suppliers and other product liability parties, went to trial about 45 days later. After nine months of trial, the Court directed verdicts of no liability in favor of three defendants: Johnson Controls, Inc., Barber Colman, Inc., and Quantum Chemical. A number of the other defendants had settled and trial resumed against 36 remaining defendants on May 14, 1990.

After fifteen months of trial, the jury reached its verdict following one week of deliberations. Of the ten remaining defendants the jury found five not liable. In all, payments for the deaths and injuries totaled more than $210 million and court records show that the case involved more than 1,000,000 documents.

== Legacy ==
The Dupont Plaza Hotel fire and other incidents of the era gave rise to several amendments to security policies in hotels around the world. One big problem at the time was the lack of standard fire safety requirements. The hotel included an un-sprinklered 17-story tower housing 423 guest rooms. The fire alarm system in the tower was not working, and many guests were not aware of the fire until they saw or smelled it, heard someone shouting "Fire", or heard firefighters responding. In 1987, there were four major fire codes across the United States with over 1,800 variations because of local codes and ordinances, so that a local code in one city would have significant fire protection requirements while that in another would have none.

On September 25, 1990, three years after the disaster, the United States enacted the Hotel and Motel Fire Safety Act of 1990, requiring all hotels and other public accommodations wanting to accommodate federal workers or hold federally funded activities to have smoke detectors in all guest rooms and to have working sprinkler systems if the building had more than three stories. U.S. Representative Sherwood L. Boehlert stated that the law was one of the first times the U.S. government took "direct action to protect the public at large from the danger of fire". The United States Fire Administration has credited the Dupont Plaza fire along with the MGM Grand fire in 1980 as the catalysts for the safety requirements being signed into law.

AIG, a lead insurance underwriter supplying coverage for the blaze, ultimately acquired title to the shuttered hotel in June 1989 as part of the settlement of claims arising from the fire. In October 1992, AIG announced plans to completely renovate the hotel at a cost of $130 million and rebrand it as a Marriott. The hotel reopened on February 16, 1995, as the San Juan Marriott Resort & Casino.

== See also ==
- History of hotel fires in the United States
- Skyscraper fire
- Winecoff Hotel fire, the deadliest hotel fire in United States history
