= Clemente Ruiz Nazario =

Puerto Rican judge

Judge of the United States District Court for the District of Puerto Rico
- In office January 28, 1952 – December, 1966
- Appointed by: Harry S. Truman
- Preceded by: Thomas H. Roberts
- Succeeded by: Juan B. Fernandez-Badillo

Personal details
- Born: November 23, 1896 San Germán, Puerto Rico, U.S.
- Died: December 25, 1969 (aged 73) Guaynabo, Puerto Rico
- Education: University of Puerto Rico School of Law (JD)

Clemente Ruiz Nazario (November 23, 1896 in San Germán, Puerto Rico – December 25, 1969), was the first Puerto Rican appointed as District Judge to the United States District Court for the District of Puerto Rico.

== Education and career ==
Ruiz Nazario served in as a Second Lieutenant in the United States Army Reserve. He was president of the Boy Scouts of America for the New York, New Jersey and Puerto Rico region. He went to University of Puerto Rico where he received his teacher certificate and his law degree from the University of Puerto Rico School of Law.

== Federal judicial service ==
He was appointed by President Harry S. Truman, in 1952. Setting a precedent, the appointment of Ruiz Nazario to the federal district court in Puerto Rico marked the beginning of an uninterrupted practice of appointing Puerto Rican men and women to that Court. Nominated as the next-to-last fixed-term judge in the District of Puerto Rico, he was joined by a second judge as Puerto Rico's federal caseload increased, Judge Hiram Rafael Cancio who, after Ruiz Nazario's resignation in December 1966, was appointed as Puerto Rico's first Article III lifetime federal judge.

== Death ==
Clemente Ruiz Nazario died on December 25, 1969, at age 73. He was buried at Cementerio Católico San Vicente de Paul in Ponce, Puerto Rico.

== Legacy ==
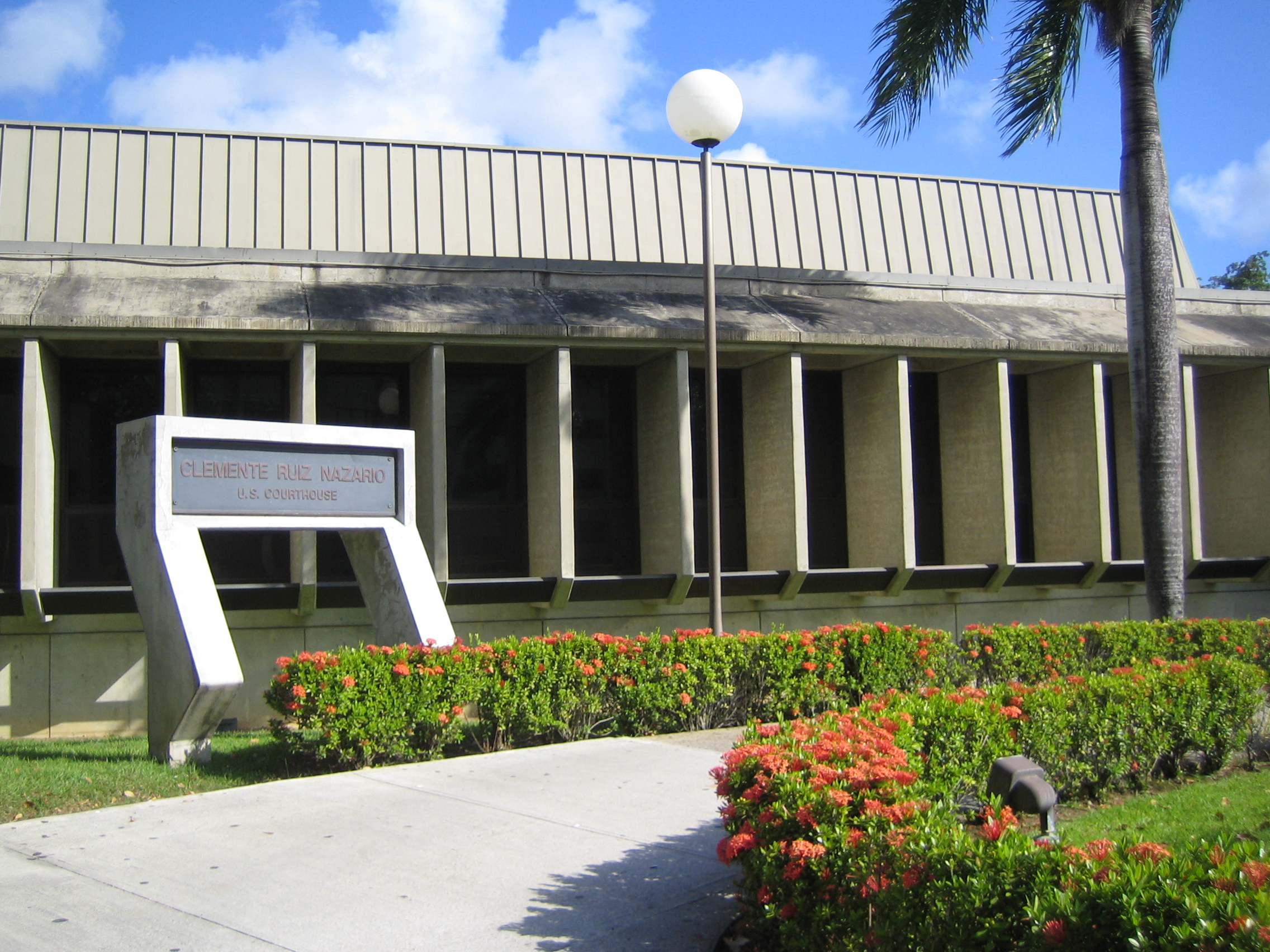
Clemente Ruiz Nazario Courthouse, in Hato Rey, PR.

The main Clemente Ruiz Nazario United States Courthouse in San Juan, Puerto Rico, adjacent to the Federico Degetau Federal Building is named after him.

== See also ==
- List of Hispanic and Latino American jurists
- List of Puerto Ricans

Legal offices
Preceded by Thomas H. Roberts	Judge of the United States District Court for the District of Puerto Rico; 1952–1966	Succeeded by Juan B. Fernandez-Badillo
