= David Chávez (attorney) =

American attorney and jurist (1897–1984)

Judge of the New Mexico Supreme Court
- In office 1960–1968

Judge of the United States District Court for the District of Puerto Rico
- In office 1947–1950
- Appointed by: Harry S. Truman
- Preceded by: Robert A. Cooper
- Succeeded by: Thomas H. Roberts

34th Mayor of Santa Fe
- In office 1932–1934
- Preceded by: James C. McConvery
- Succeeded by: Charles B. Barker

Personal details
- Born: November 12, 1897 Los Chavez, New Mexico
- Died: November 3, 1984 (aged 86) Las Vegas, New Mexico, U.S.
- Relations: Dennis Chávez (brother)
- Education: University of New Mexico (BA); Georgetown University (JD)

Military service
- Branch/service: United States Army
- Battles/wars: World War I World War II

David Chávez Jr. (November 12, 1897 – November 3, 1984) was an American attorney and jurist who served as a judge on the United States District Court for the District of Puerto Rico from 1947 to 1950, and as a justice of the New Mexico Supreme Court from 1960 to 1968.

== Early life and education ==
Chávez was born in Los Chaves in Valencia County and grew up in Albuquerque, New Mexico. He served in the United States Army during World War I. He earned a Bachelor of Arts degree from the University of New Mexico and a Juris Doctor from the Georgetown University Law Center.

== Career ==
Chávez served as mayor of Santa Fe from 1932 to 1934. From 1936 to 1942 he was a District Judge at the First Judicial District in Santa Fe. Chávez C5 resigned to serve in the U.S. Army during World War II and returned to the bench after the war. He served in the Army's Judge Advocate General Corps and participated in the prosecution of 40 Dachau concentration camp guards. The U.S. Army awarded Colonel Chavez a bronze star medal for his service prosecuting Nazi war criminals. He was appointed to the judgeship of the Puerto Rico District by President Harry S. Truman and served from 1947 to 1950. He returned to New Mexico in 1950 to run unsuccessfully for Governor. He worked in private practice in Santa Fe until Governor Burroughs appointed him to the New Mexico Supreme Court in 1959. Chávez served on the New Mexico Supreme Court from 1960 until 1968.

== Personal life ==
He was the brother of United States Senator Dennis Chávez. He died in Las Vegas, New Mexico.

Political offices
Preceded by Robert A. Cooper	Judge, United States District Court for the District of Puerto Rico; 1947–1950	Succeeded by Thomas H. Roberts
Preceded by Eugene D. Lujan	Justice of the New Mexico Supreme Court; 1960–1968	Succeeded by Paul Tackett
