= Thomas H. Roberts =

American judge

Thomas Roberts

36th Chief Justice of the Rhode Island Supreme Court
- In office 1966–1976
- Preceded by: Francis Condon
- Succeeded by: Joseph A. Bevilacqua

Judge of the United States District Court for the District of Puerto Rico
- In office 1950–1952
- Appointed by: Harry S. Truman
- Preceded by: David Chávez
- Succeeded by: Clemente Ruiz Nazario

Personal details
- Born: Thomas Hagen Roberts; January 4, 1902 Providence, Rhode Island, U.S.
- Died: January 7, 1976 (aged 74)
- Relations: Dennis J. Roberts (brother)
- Children: Dennis J. Roberts II
- Education: Fordham University (BA); Boston University (JD)

Thomas Hagan Roberts (January 4, 1902 – January 7, 1976) was an American attorney and jurist who served as a judge on the United States District Court for the District of Puerto Rico and Rhode Island Supreme Court.

== Early life and education ==
Born in Providence, Rhode Island, Roberts received his bachelor's degree from Fordham University and his J.D. degree from Boston University School of Law. During World War II, he served as director of Rhode Island Civil Defense and chairman of the Rhode Island Bureau of Police and Fire.

== Career ==
From 1949 to 1950, Roberts served as chief counsel of the United Nations War Crimes Commission. Roberts was appointed to the judgeship for the United States District Court for the District of Puerto Rico, by President Harry S. Truman, and served from 1950 to 1952. Roberts served on the Rhode Island Superior Court in 1951 and was appointed to succeed Justice Jeremiah E. O'Connell on the Rhode Island Supreme Court in 1956, serving until 1976, and as chief justice from 1966 to 1976. He was the brother of Rhode Island Governor Dennis J. Roberts.

Preceded by David Chávez	Judge, United States District Court for the District of Puerto Rico; 1950–1952	Succeeded by Clemente Ruiz-Nazario
Preceded by Francis B. Condon	Chief Justice of the Rhode Island Supreme Court; 1966-1976	Succeeded by Joseph A. Bevilacqua, Sr.
