= Silvia Carreño-Coll =

Dominican-American judge (born 1963)

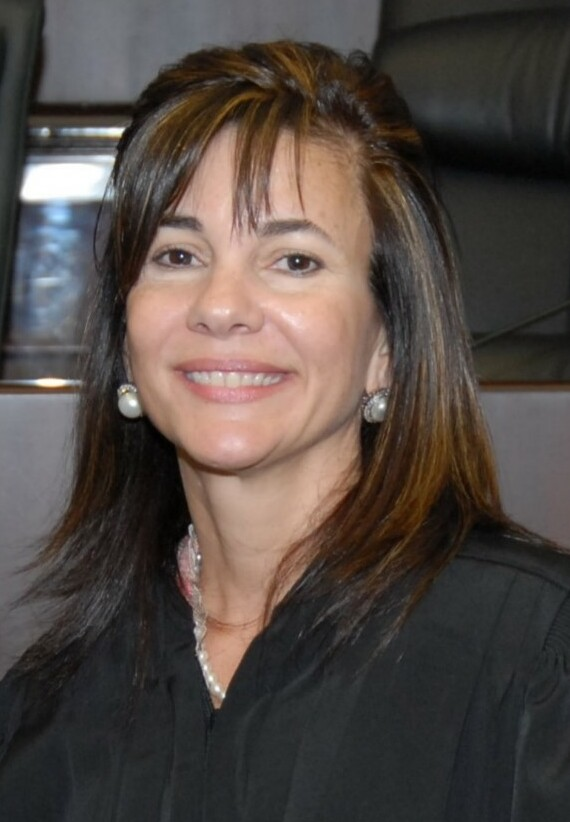

Judge of the United States District Court for the District of Puerto Rico
- Incumbent
- Assumed office February 26, 2020
- Appointed by: Donald Trump
- Preceded by: Jay A. García-Gregory

Magistrate Judge of the United States District Court for the District of Puerto Rico
- In office 2011 – February 26, 2020

Personal details
- Born: Silvia Luisa Carreño-Coll; 1963 (age 62–63) Santo Domingo, Dominican Republic
- Education: Emerson College (BA); University of Puerto Rico School of Law (JD)

Silvia Luisa Carreño-Coll (born 1963) is a United States district judge for the United States District Court for the District of Puerto Rico and a former United States magistrate judge of the same court.

== Education ==
Carreño-Coll earned her Bachelor of Arts, cum laude, from Emerson College and her Juris Doctor, cum laude, from the University of Puerto Rico School of Law.

== Career ==
Carreño-Coll served as Associate Regional Counsel for Caribbean Programs in the United States Environmental Protection Agency and as an Assistant United States Attorney in the United States Attorney's Office for the District of Puerto Rico. She teaches a federal practice seminar at the University of Puerto Rico School of Law and is a member of the Federal Bar District Examination Committee.

=== Federal judicial service ===
Carreño-Coll served as a United States magistrate judge for the District of Puerto Rico from 2011 to 2020.

On August 28, 2019, President Donald Trump announced his intent to nominate Carreño-Coll to serve as a United States district judge for the United States District Court for the District of Puerto Rico. She has been nominated to the seat vacated by Judge Jay A. García-Gregory, who assumed senior status on September 30, 2018. On October 15, 2019, her nomination was sent to the United States Senate. On October 16, 2019, a hearing on her nomination was held before the Senate Judiciary Committee. Resident Commissioner of Puerto Rico Jenniffer González has announced her support of the nomination. On November 7, 2019, her nomination was reported out of committee by a voice vote. On February 25, 2020, the Senate invoked cloture on her nomination by a 96–1 vote. Her nomination was confirmed later that day by a 96–0 vote. She received her judicial commission on February 26, 2020. She was sworn in on March 2, 2020.

== See also ==
- List of Hispanic and Latino American jurists

Legal offices
Preceded by Jay A. García-Gregory	Judge of the United States District Court for the District of Puerto Rico; 2020–present	Incumbent
