= Raymond L. Acosta =

American judge (1925–2014)

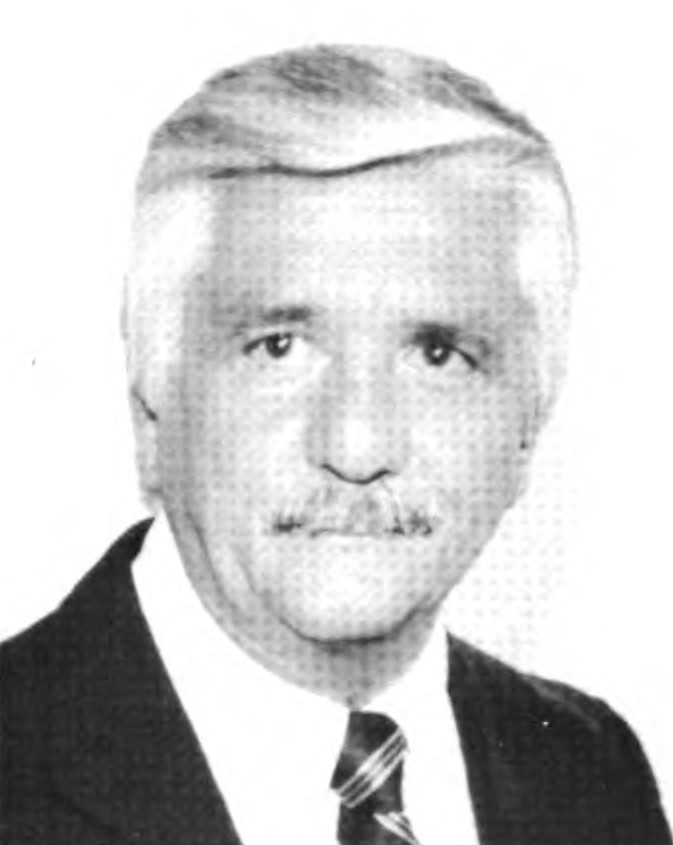

Senior Judge of the United States District Court for the District of Puerto Rico
- In office June 1, 1994 – December 23, 2014

Judge of the United States District Court for the District of Puerto Rico
- In office September 30, 1982 – June 1, 1994
- Appointed by: Ronald Reagan
- Preceded by: Jose Victor Toledo
- Succeeded by: Jay A. García-Gregory

Personal details
- Born: May 31, 1925 New York City, U.S.
- Died: December 23, 2014 (aged 89) Chapin, South Carolina, U.S.
- Education: Rutgers Law School (JD)

Raymond L. Acosta (May 31, 1925 – December 23, 2014) was a United States district judge of the United States District Court for the District of Puerto Rico.

== Education and career ==
Born in New York City, New York, Acosta after serving in the United States Navy from 1943 to 1946, during World War II, and participated in the D-Day Invasion of Normandy (Utah Beach) attended Rutgers School of Law – Newark where received a Juris Doctor in 1951. He was in private practice of law in Hackensack, New Jersey, from 1953 to 1954, and was then a special agent at the Federal Bureau of Investigation field office in San Diego, California, Washington, D.C., and Miami, Florida, from 1954 to 1958. He was an Assistant United States Attorney in San Juan, Puerto Rico, from 1958 to 1961. Acosta went into private practice in San Juan from 1962 to 1980, specializing in banking and trust litigation. In 1980 President Jimmy Carter named him United States Attorney for the District of Puerto Rico, serving until 1982.

== Federal judicial service ==
On September 9, 1982, President Ronald Reagan nominated Acosta to a seat on the United States District Court for the District of Puerto Rico vacated by Judge Jose Victor Toledo. Acosta was confirmed by the United States Senate on September 29, 1982, and received his commission the following day. He assumed senior status on June 1, 1994. He died on December 23, 2014.

== Notable case ==
Acosta was perhaps best known for presiding over the complex litigation resulting from the Dupont Plaza Hotel arson, a disaster that claimed 98 lives. His "masterful and innovative handling of the complex mass disaster litigation" led to the approval of a $220 million settlement of the lawsuit which had involved 2,400 plaintiffs, 250 defendants, and three trial phases over 19 months.

== Honor ==
The Puerto Rico Chapter of the Federal Bar Association was renamed in honor of Acosta in 2008.

== See also ==
- List of Hispanic and Latino American jurists

Legal offices
Preceded by Jose Victor Toledo	Judge of the United States District Court for the District of Puerto Rico; 1982–1994	Succeeded by Jay A. García-Gregory
