= Hato Rey =

Barrio in San Juan, Puerto Rico

- Central business district
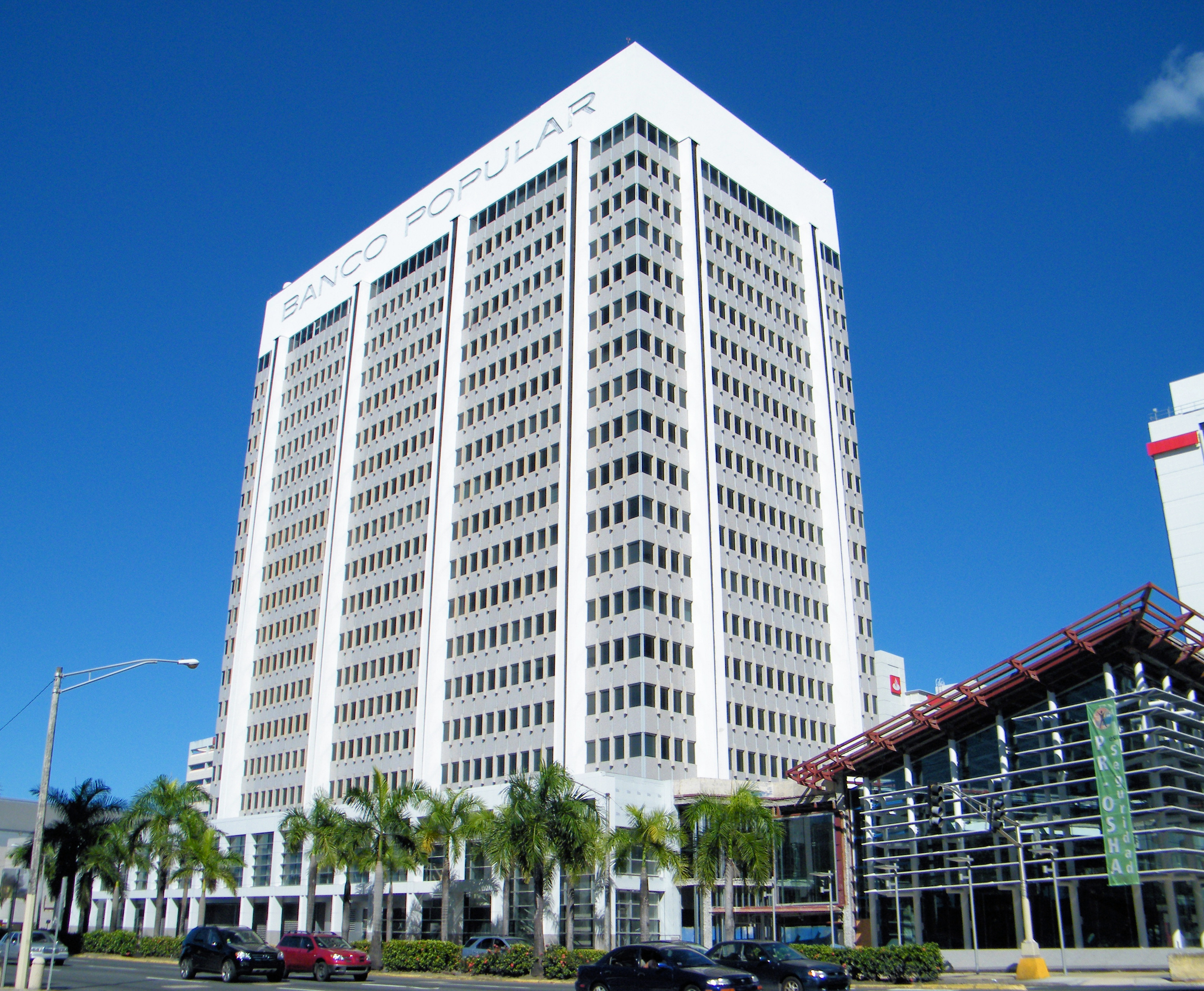
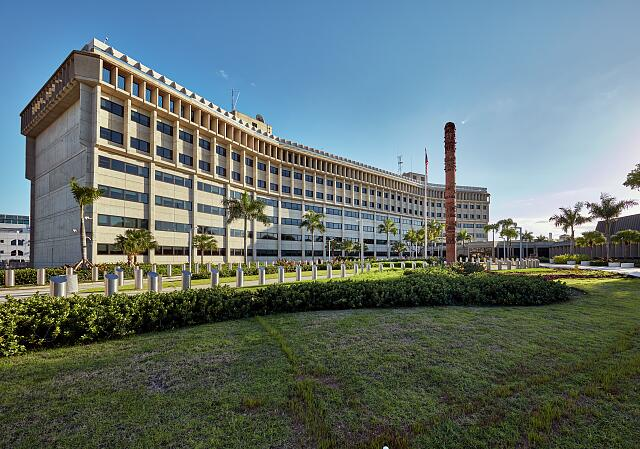
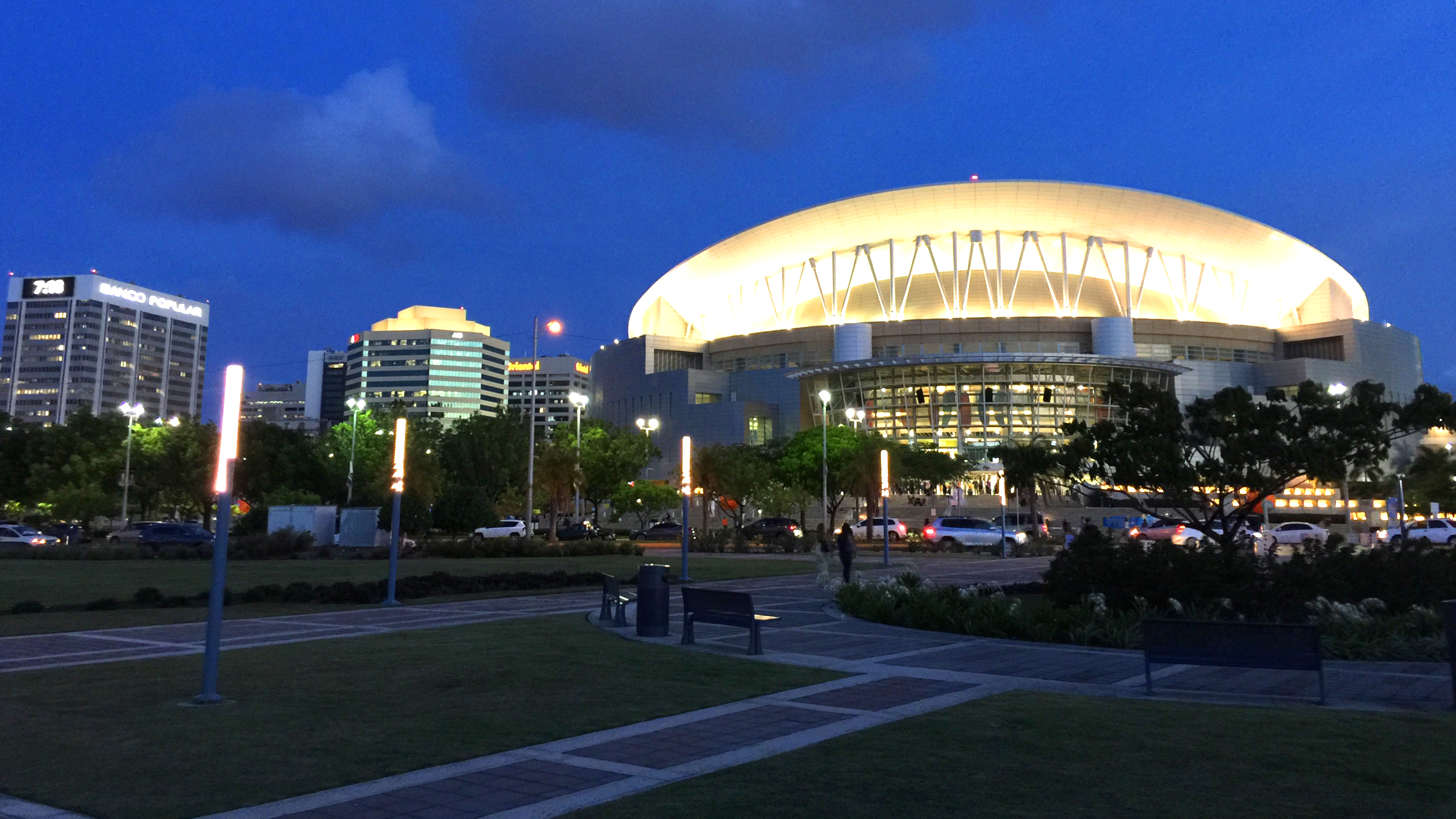
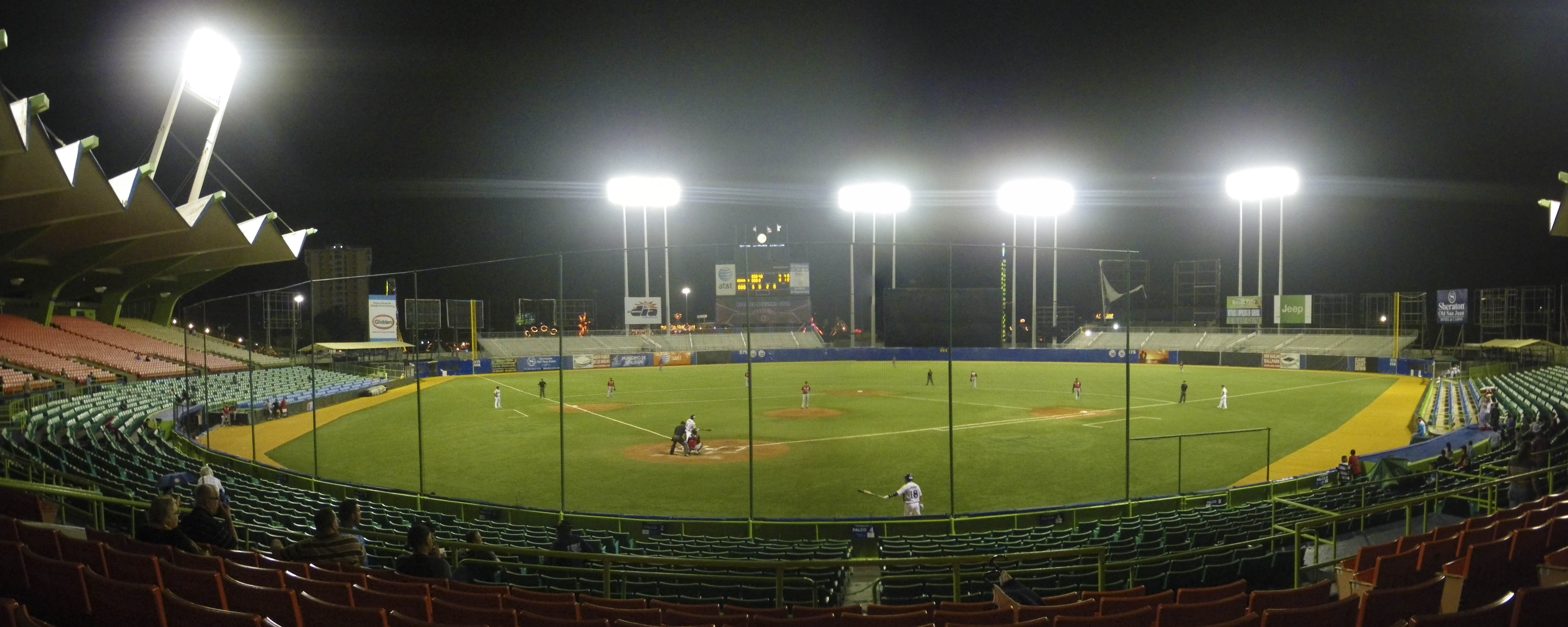
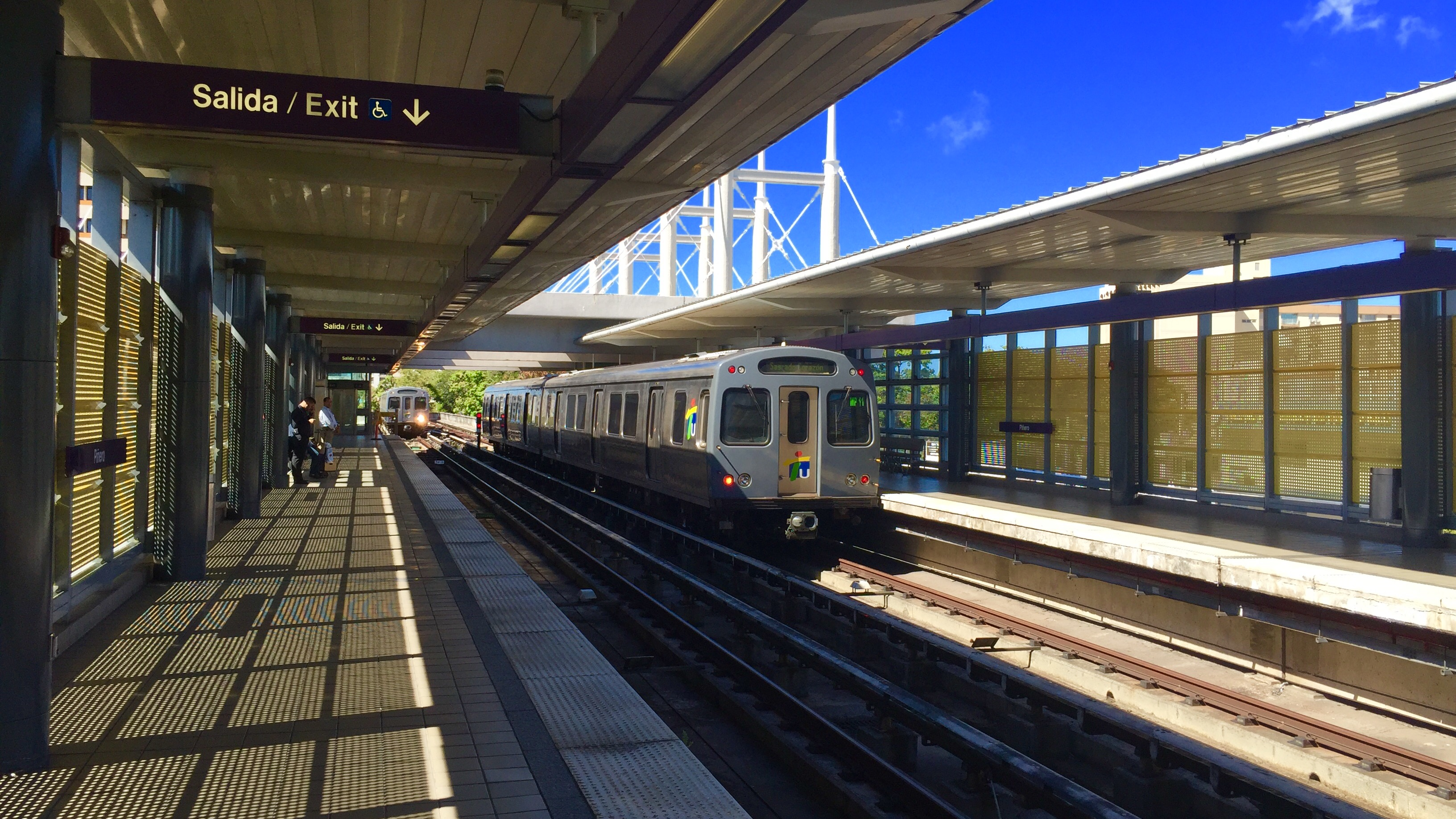
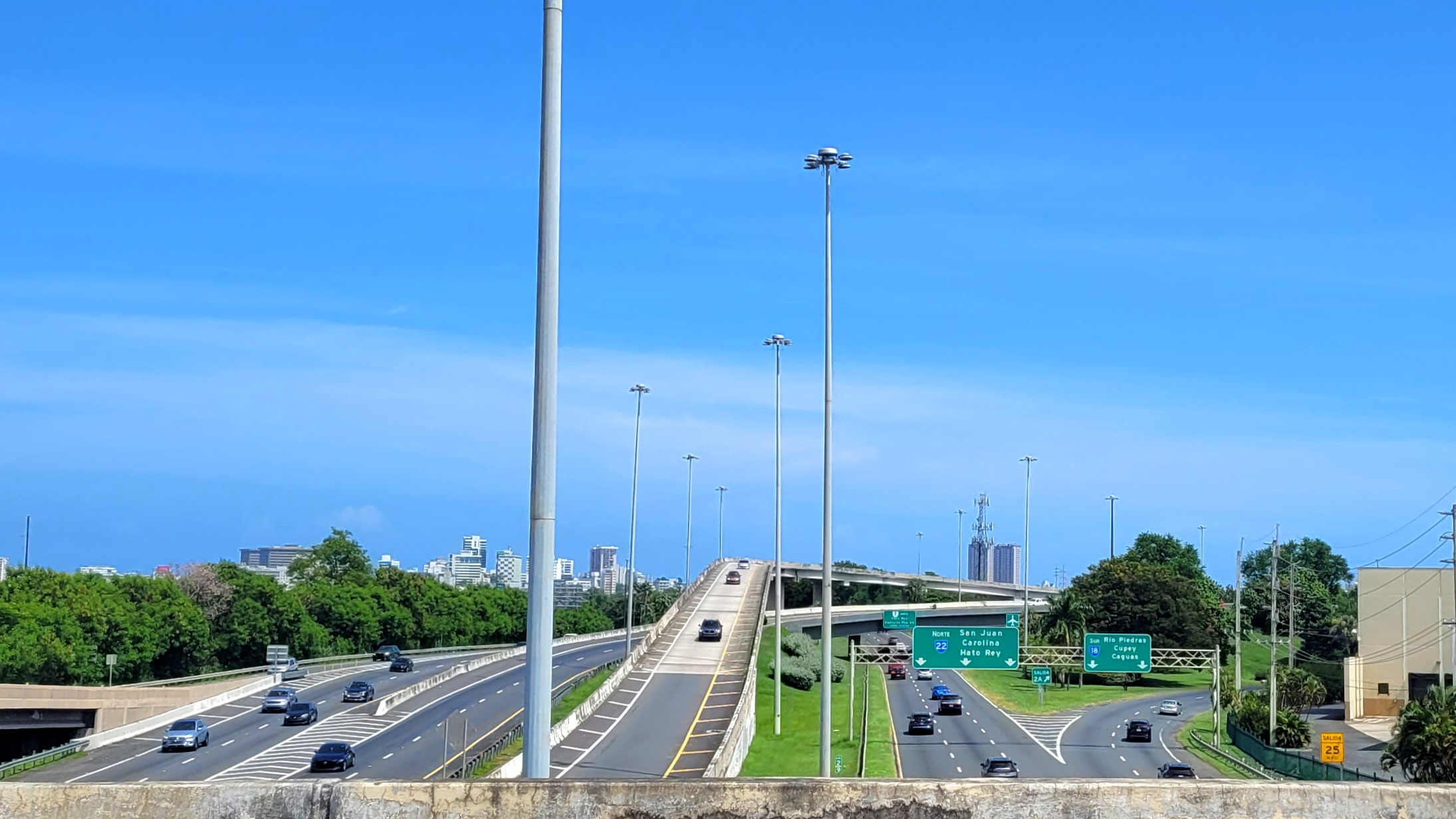
- Hato Rey (background) and Santurce barrio (foreground) from Condado district Popular Bank in Milla de Oro Federico Degetau Federal Building Choliseo arena Bithorn stadium Piñero station of Tren Urbano PR-22 Highway into Hato Rey Hato Rey (foreground) and Old San Juan quarter and Santurce (far background)

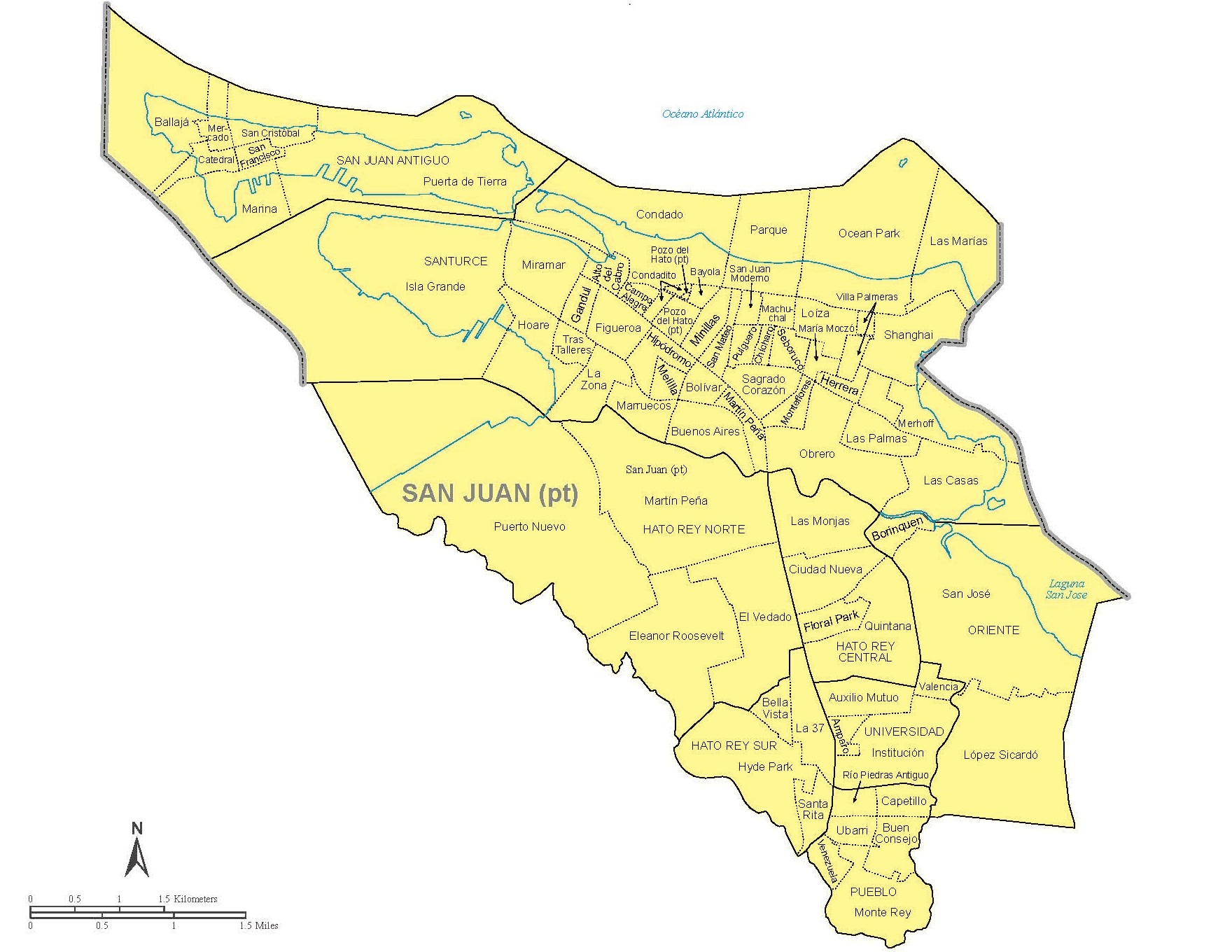
- Hato Rey and districts (south) bounded by Santurce, San Juan, Puerto Rico (north) within northern San Juan
- Interactive map
- Coordinates: 18.4235°N 66.0576°W
- Commonwealth: Puerto Rico
- Municipality: San Juan

Area
  - Total: 6.18 sq mi (16.01 km^{2})
  - Land: 5.38 sq mi (13.93 km^{2})
  - Water: 0.80 sq mi (2.07 km^{2})

Population (2020 census)
  - Total: 41,881
  - Density: 7,784.567/sq mi (3,005.638/km^{2})
- ZIP Code: 00917, 00919

Hato Rey (Spanish for ''king’s cattle farm''), often considered the central business district of Puerto Rico, is a highly urbanized financial, commercial, and residential area in San Juan, the capital city and municipality of the archipelago and island. Located to the immediate south of Santurce barrio in the center of the San Juan metropolitan area and divided into 3 of 18 San Juan barrios, namely Hato Rey Norte, Hato Rey Central, and Hato Rey Sur, it is about 3 to 6 miles (4.8 to 9.7 km) from the Old San Juan historic quarter, Condado and Isla Verde resort areas, and SJU airport. Hato Rey is home to the Milla de Oro financial district, José Miguel Agrelot Coliseum, Hiram Bithorn Stadium, Telemundo International television network headquarters, and Plaza Las Américas shopping mall, the U.S. District Court for the District of Puerto Rico offices, among others. It was formerly a barrio of the dissolved municipality of Río Piedras, which was merged into San Juan in 1951.

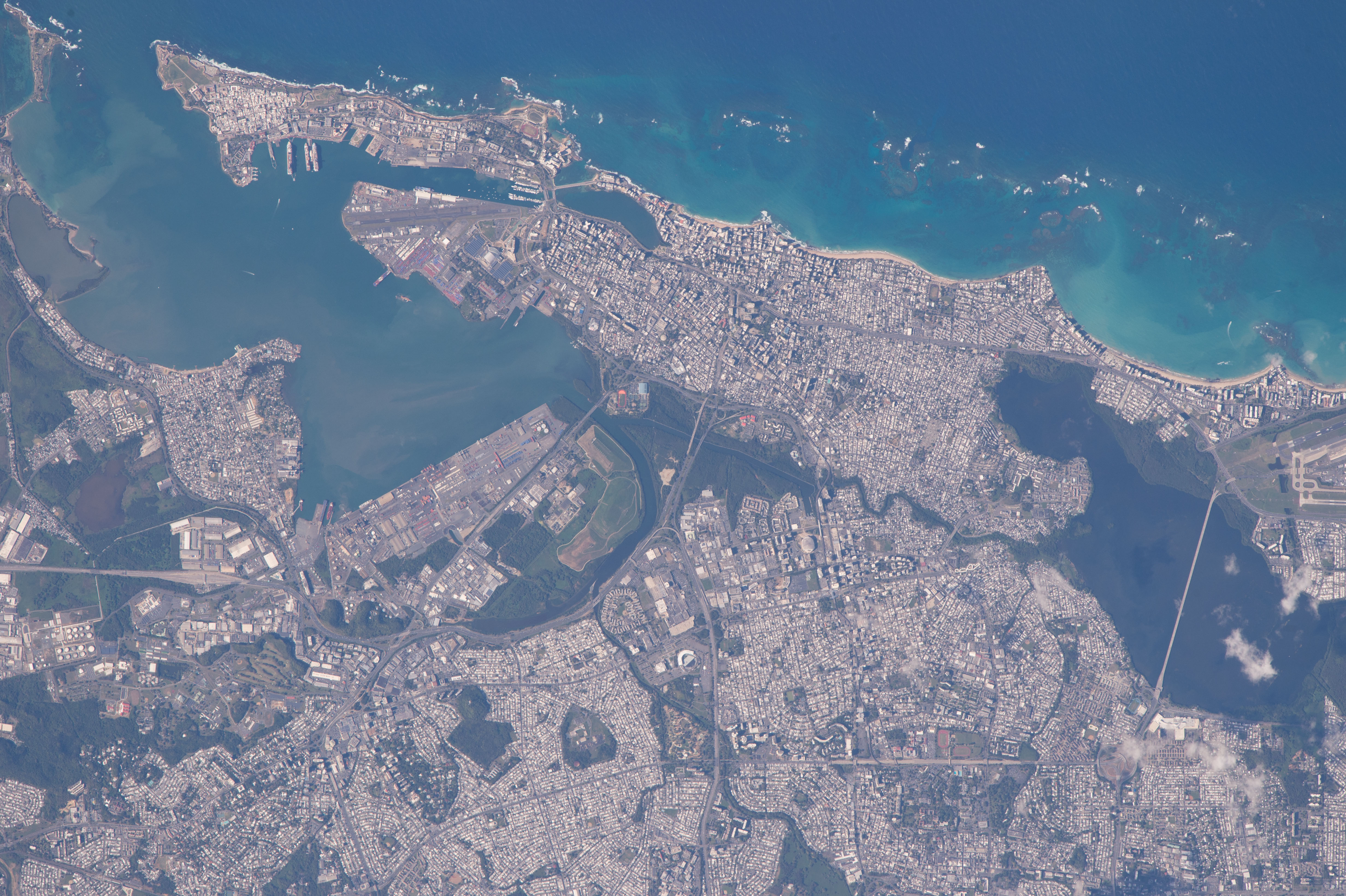
Satellite view from Old San Juan historic quarter (upper left) in San Juan Islet to Isla Verde resort area (upper right) in the Carolina municipality with Hato Rey district visible (center right), 2016

== Urban landscape ==
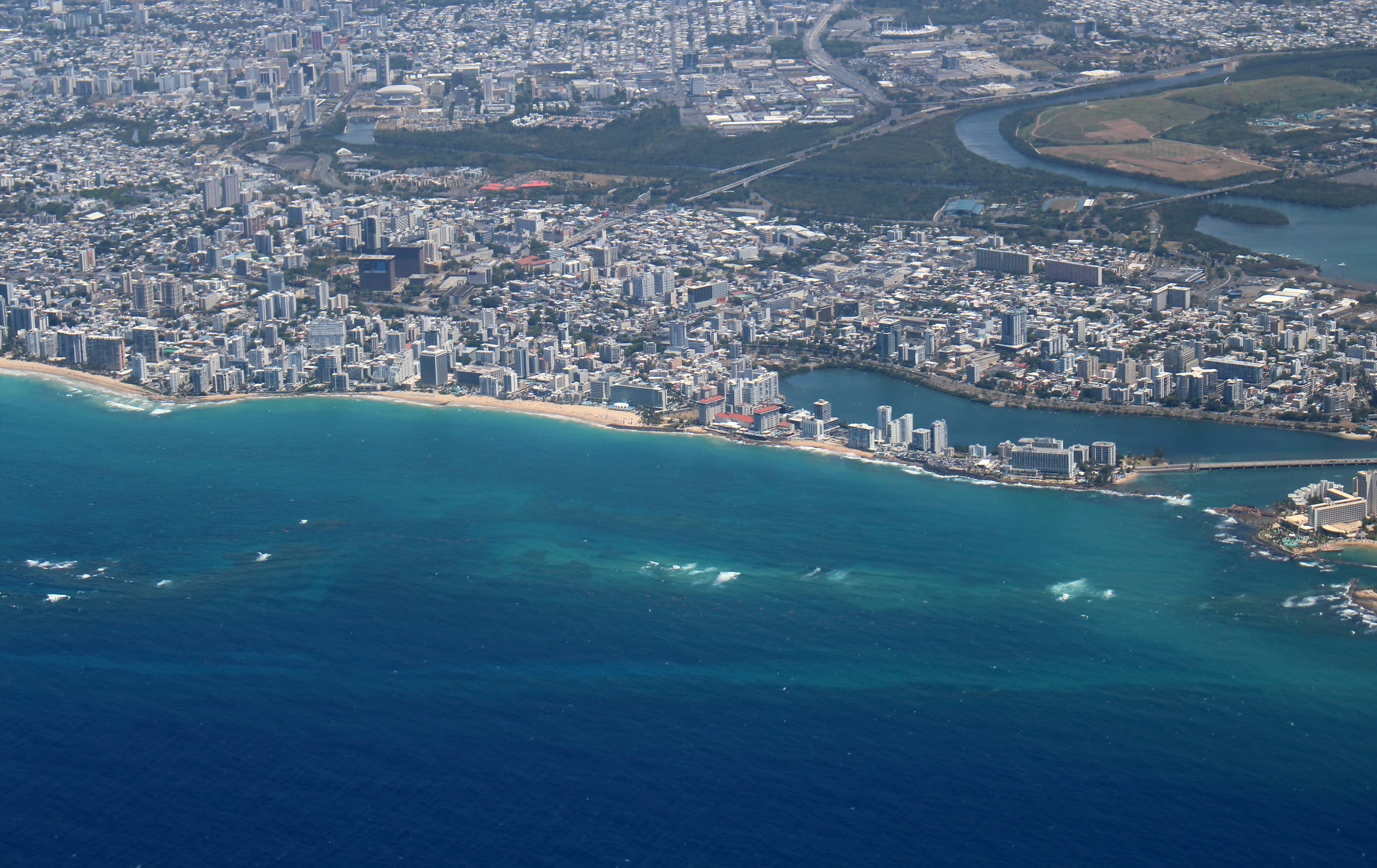
Aerial view of Santurce barrio (foreground) and Hato Rey district (background), 2022

Its name means "king's cattle farm" (hato). In the 18th century, cattle would roam among the sugar cane fields in the area. Its proximity to residential areas such as San Juan, Río Piedras, Miramar made it a perfect location from where to produce what its residents would eat. The area also used to be known as Las Monjas (the nuns) due to a convent that used to be located in the area in the 19th century.

The Northern portion of Hato Rey is a startling contrast between blight and poverty and La Milla de Oro (The Golden Mile), a stretch that effectively covers only one mile but that is home to the headquarters of many large local and international banks. It is one of the most important centers of Puerto Rico and the Caribbean's economy and many upper middle class condominiums are also located here.

Hato Rey is also home to a series of boutiques and restaurants (mostly along Roosevelt Avenue). The José Miguel Agrelot Coliseum and the Tren Urbano metro system have also reshaped Hato Rey by bringing people and business into the area after work hours. The metro system is also helping to ease traffic woes in the area by decongesting the roads. Phi Sigma Alpha fraternity's main headquarters are located in Mexico Street in Hato Rey. The Hato Rey Lions Club, founded in 1955, is located in Alhambra Street, across from the Polytechnic University.

Because of its location, many commuters travelling to Old San Juan must drive through Hato Rey.

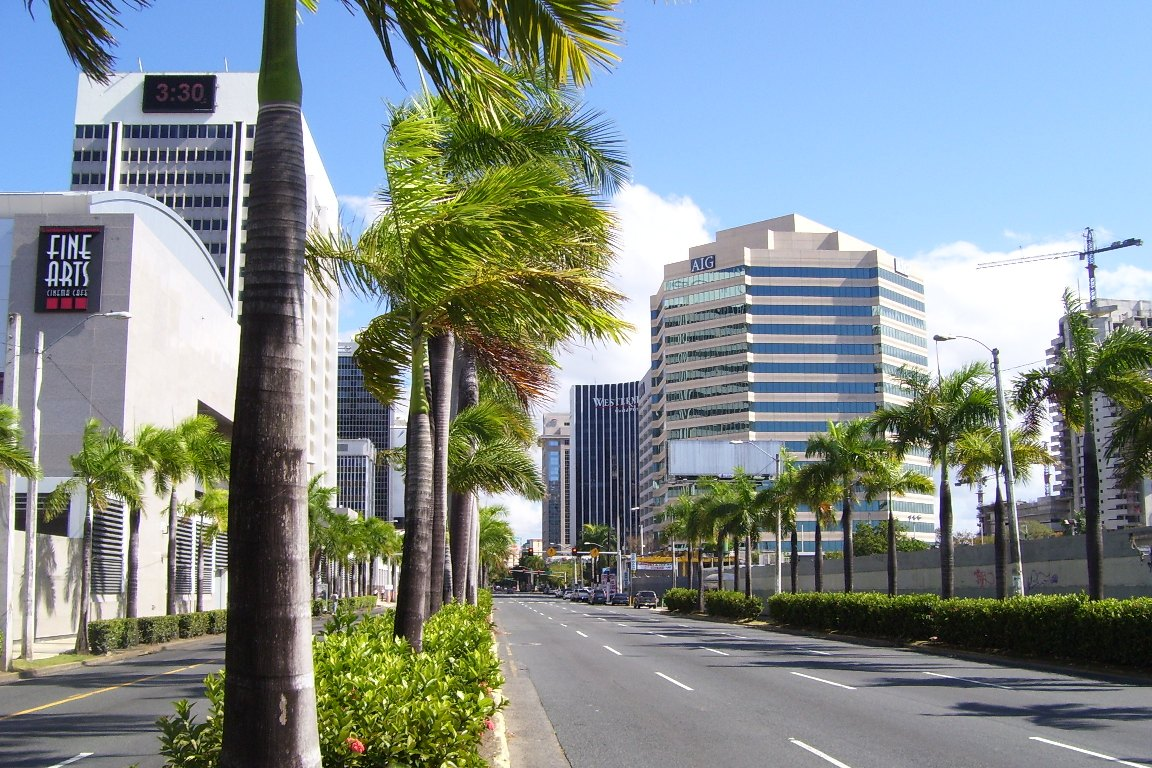
Milla de Oro

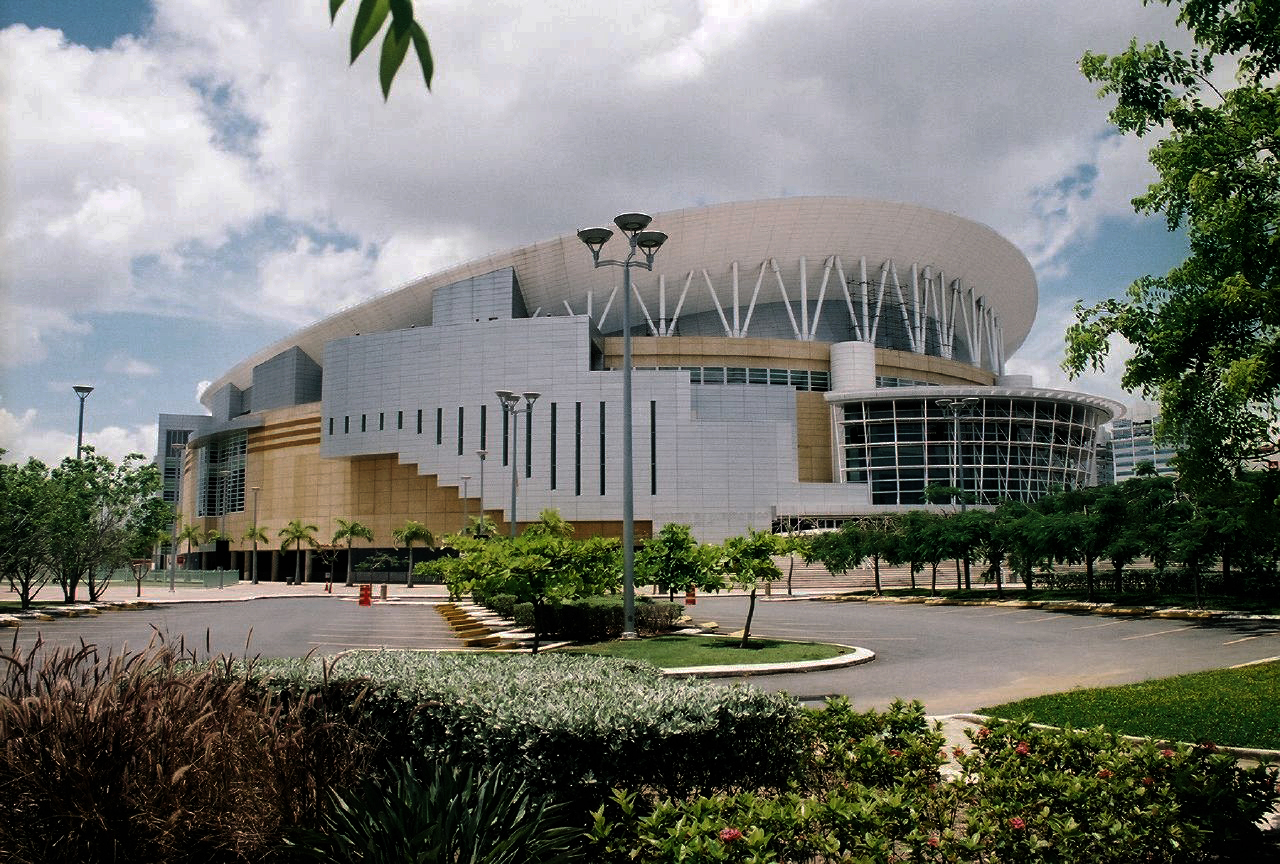
José Miguel Agrelot Coliseum

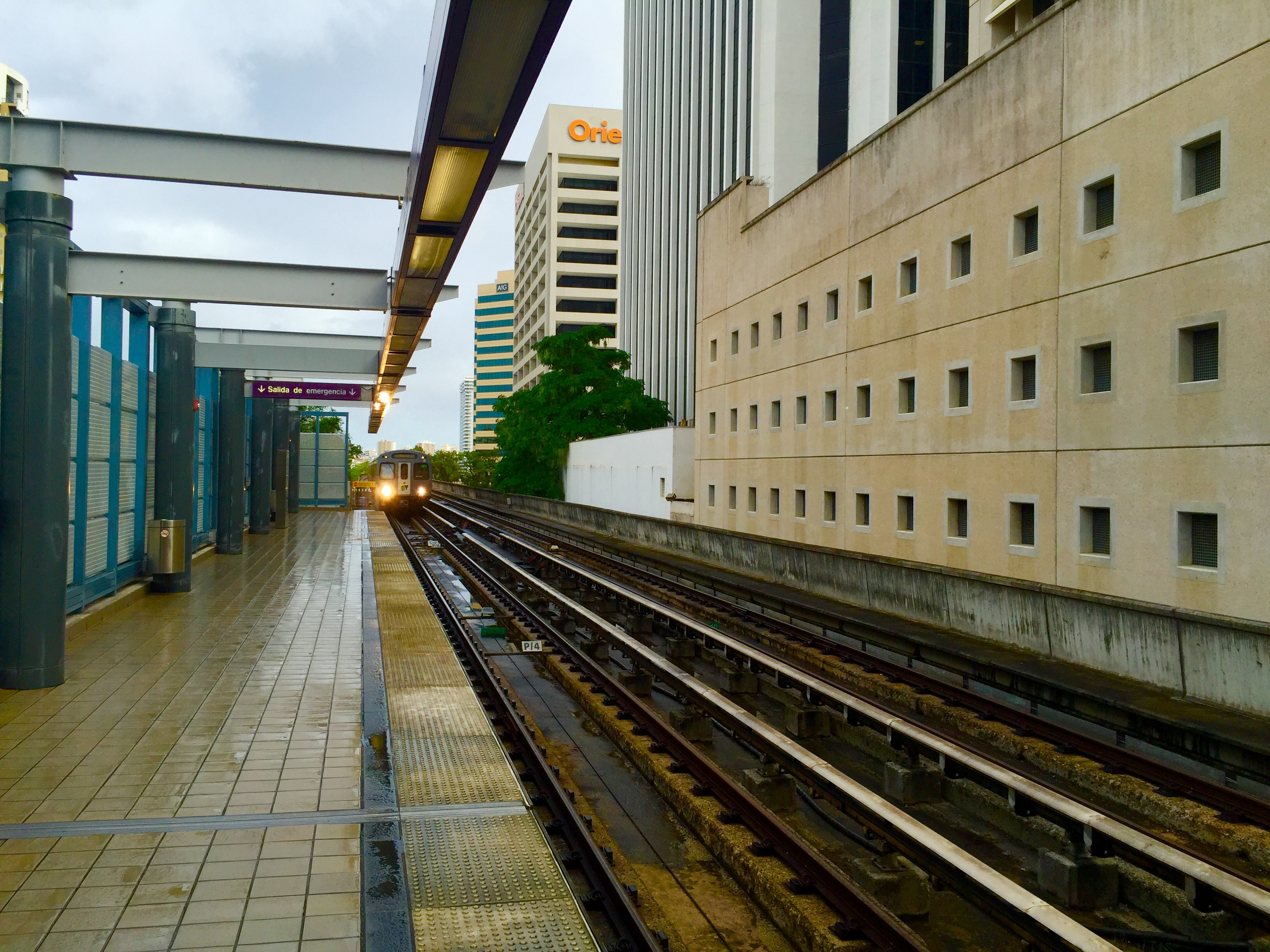
Tren Urbano Roosevelt station

== Economy ==
Important buildings in Hato Rey include the Banco Popular headquarters, which in 1965 was the tallest building in Hato Rey. Plaza Las Américas, a large mall is located in Hato Rey, as is the Roberto Clemente Coliseum. Puerto Rico's FBI headquarters are also located in Hato Rey. Because of the area's closeness to the airport, major airlines, such as Avianca, have offices in Hato Rey.

Compaq at one point operated its Puerto Rico offices in Hato Rey.

== Government and infrastructure ==
The Federal Office Building, a U.S. Federal Courthouse, and the Federal Bureau of Investigation (FBI) San Juan field office are in Hato Rey.

The Puerto Rico Department of Education is headquartered in Hato Rey.

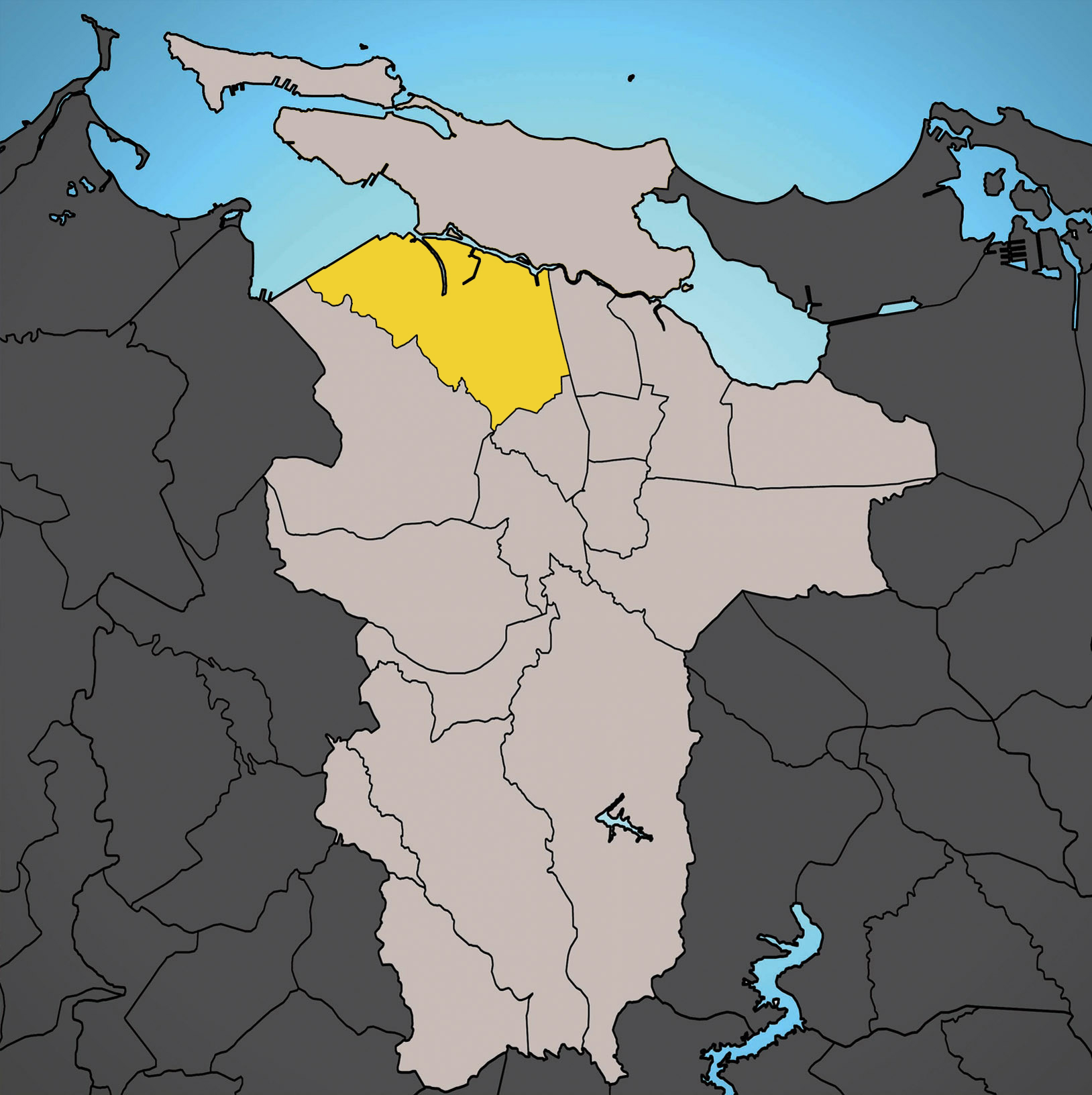
Hato Rey Norte

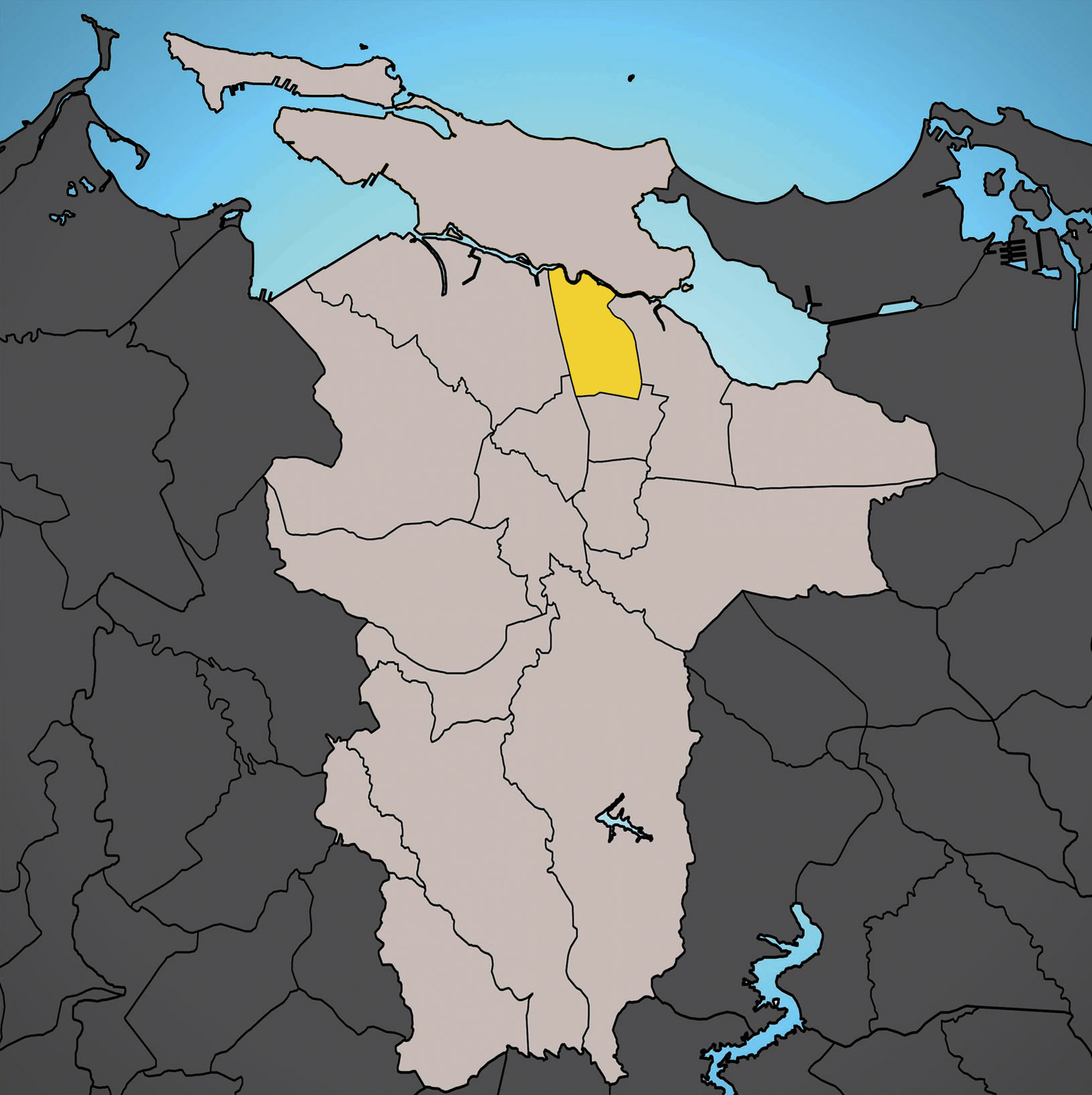
Hato Rey Central

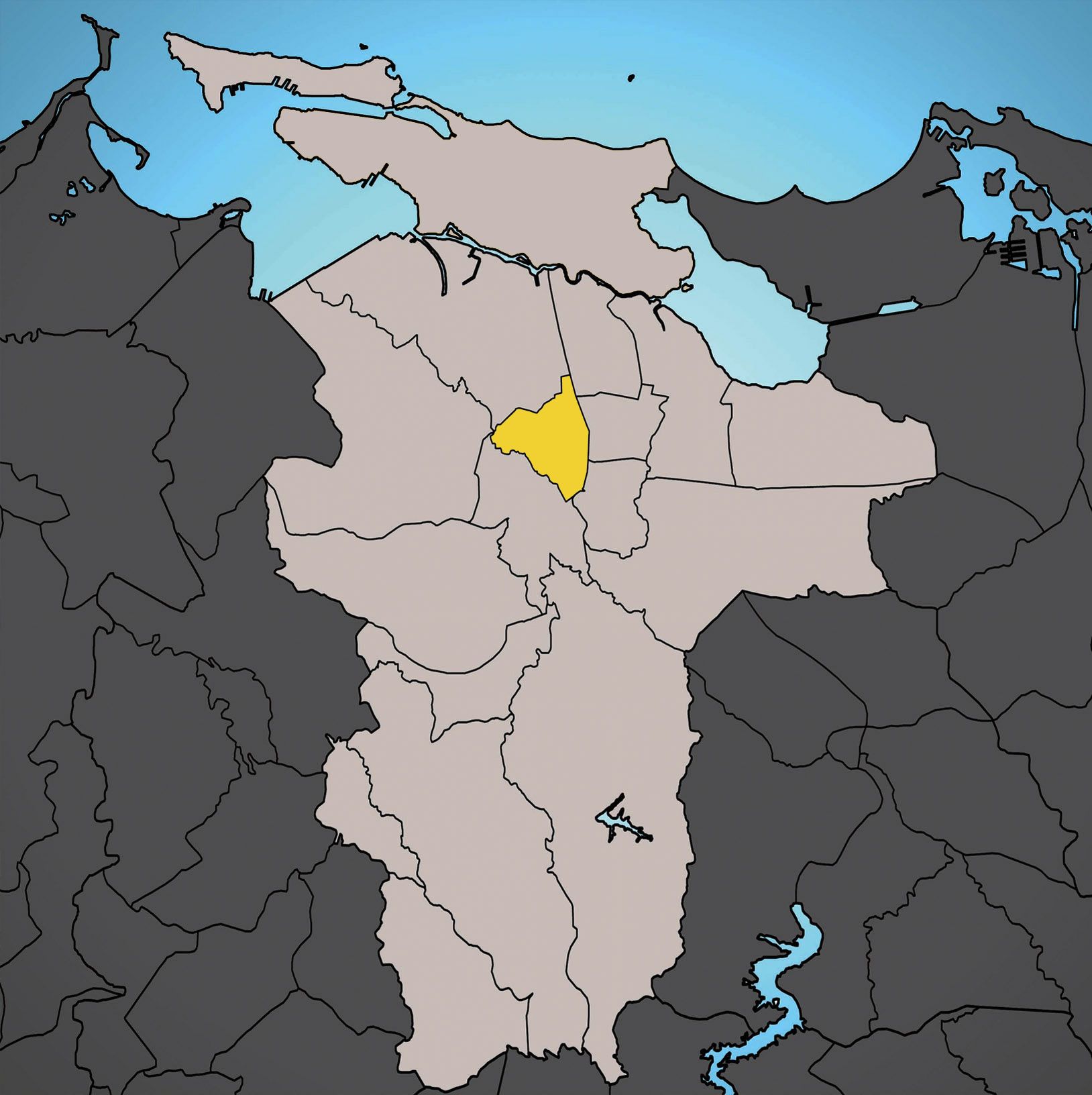
Hato Rey Sur
