= Hernan Gregorio Pesquera =

U.S. federal judge in Puerto Rico

Chief Judge of the United States District Court for the District of Puerto Rico
- In office 1980–1982
- Preceded by: Jose Victor Toledo
- Succeeded by: Juan R. Torruella

Judge of the United States District Court for the District of Puerto Rico
- In office October 17, 1972 – September 8, 1982
- Appointed by: Richard Nixon
- Preceded by: Juan B. Fernandez-Badillo
- Succeeded by: Hector Manuel Laffitte

Personal details
- Born: Hernan Gregorio Pesquera; May 25, 1924 Santurce, Puerto Rico
- Died: September 8, 1982 (aged 58)
- Education: University of Puerto Rico (BA); Cornell University (LLB)

Hernan Gregorio Pesquera (May 25, 1924 – September 8, 1982) was a United States district judge of the United States District Court for the District of Puerto Rico.

== Education and career ==
Born in Santurce, Puerto Rico, Pesquera was in the United States Army during World War II, from 1940 to 1946. He received a Bachelor of Arts degree from the University of Puerto Rico in 1944 and a Bachelor of Laws from Cornell Law School in 1948. He was in private practice in San Juan, Puerto Rico from 1948 to 1949, and was then assistant chief of the Legal Department of the Puerto Rico Transport Authority until 1951, and manager and attorney of the Wholesale Merchants Association from 1951 to 1953. He returned to private practice in San Juan from 1953 to 1972, also serving as Chairman of the Puerto Rico Racing Board from 1971 to 1972.

=== Military service ===
Pesquera was a Platoon Sergeant in the United States Army, he attended the United States Army Officers Candidate School at Fort Benning, Georgia from May 1944 to February 1945 to earned his commission as a Second Lieutenant. He was honorably discharged from active duty as a First Lieutenant. After serving on active duty he transitioned to the United States Army Reserve where he served from June 1946 until he retired from the Army Reserve as a Lieutenant Colonel in 1973. He received the Meritorious Service Medal on his retirement ceremony. The United States Army Reserve Center in Fort Allen, Puerto Rico is named after Pesquera.

== Federal judicial service ==
On September 5, 1972, Pesquera was nominated by President Richard Nixon to a seat on the United States District Court for the District of Puerto Rico vacated by Judge Juan B. Fernandez-Badillo. Pesquera was confirmed by the United States Senate on October 12, 1972, and received his commission on October 17, 1972. He served as Chief Judge from 1980 until his death on September 8, 1982.

== See also ==
- List of Hispanic and Latino American jurists

== Sources ==
Legal offices
Preceded by Juan B. Fernandez-Badillo	Judge of the United States District Court for the District of Puerto Rico; 1972–1982	Succeeded by Hector Manuel Laffitte
Preceded by Jose Victor Toledo	Chief Judge of the United States District Court for the District of Puerto Rico; 1980–1982	Succeeded by Juan R. Torruella
