= Juan R. Torruella =

U.S. federal judge in Puerto Rico (1933–2020)

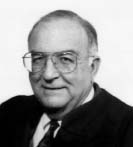

Chief Judge of the United States Court of Appeals for the First Circuit
- In office August 3, 1994 – June 15, 2001
- Preceded by: Stephen Breyer
- Succeeded by: Michael Boudin

Judge of the United States Court of Appeals for the First Circuit
- In office October 4, 1984 – October 26, 2020
- Appointed by: Ronald Reagan
- Preceded by: Seat established by 98 Stat. 333
- Succeeded by: Gustavo Gelpí

Chief Judge of the United States District Court for the District of Puerto Rico
- In office September 8, 1982 – October 30, 1984
- Preceded by: Hernan Gregorio Pesquera
- Succeeded by: Juan Pérez-Giménez

Judge of the United States District Court for the District of Puerto Rico
- In office December 20, 1974 – October 30, 1984
- Appointed by: Gerald Ford
- Preceded by: Hiram Rafael Cancio
- Succeeded by: José A. Fusté

Personal details
- Born: Juan Rafael Torruella del Valle; June 7, 1933 San Juan, Puerto Rico
- Died: October 26, 2020 (aged 87) San Juan, Puerto Rico
- Spouse: Judith Wirt (m. 1955)
- Children: 4, including Juan Jr.
- Education: University of Pennsylvania (BS); Boston University (JD); University of Virginia (LLM); University of Puerto Rico (MPA); Magdalen College, Oxford (MSt)

Juan Rafael Torruella del Valle Sr. (June 7, 1933 – October 26, 2020) was a Puerto Rican jurist. He served as a United States circuit judge of the United States Court of Appeals for the First Circuit from 1984 until his death, and as chief judge of that court from 1994 to 2001. He was the first Hispanic to serve on the First Circuit, which includes Puerto Rico.

Before becoming an appellate judge, he served as a district judge on the United States District Court for the District of Puerto Rico from 1974 to 1984. He was also a competitive sailor, competing for the Puerto Rican team at the Summer Olympic Games in 1964, 1968, 1972, and 1976.

== Education and career ==
Torruella was born in Old San Juan, on June 7, 1933, to Juan N. Torruella and Belén del Valle de Torruella. His father was a dentist who became a lawyer.

Torruella graduated from the Admiral Farragut Academy in Pine Beach, New Jersey. He received his Bachelor of Science from the Wharton School of the University of Pennsylvania in 1954, his Juris Doctor from Boston University School of Law in 1957, his Master of Laws from University of Virginia School of Law in 1984, and a Master of Public Administration from University of Puerto Rico in 1984. His LL.M. work focused on judicial process. In 2003, Torruella received a Master of Studies in modern European history from Magdalen College, Oxford.

Torruella became a member of International Council Of Arbitration for Sport in 2006, and served as Deputy President of the CAS Ordinary Arbitration Division from 2010 to 2014.

== Career as a lawyer ==
Although he intended to practice law in Massachusetts following his graduation from law school, Torruella did not take the Massachusetts bar examination because he contracted a serious case of the mumps the day before the exam. He instead returned to Puerto Rico and was admitted to the bar there. He served as law clerk to Associate Justice Pedro Pimentel of the Puerto Rico Supreme Court, and then worked for three years for the National Labor Relations Board in an investigations and litigation role in Puerto Rico. His practice was mostly in civil law, including admiralty, aviation, and labor law, but he also served as court-appointed counsel in some criminal cases. Torruella was in private practice of law in San Juan from 1959 to 1974, where he handled cases in both the federal courts and the Puerto Rico courts. He first worked at the law firm of Fiddler, Gonzalez & Rodriguez for eight years, becoming a partner at the firm. Torruella then became a solo practitioner, and then practiced law in partnership with Jaime Pieras, Jr., who later became a federal district judge.

== Federal judicial service ==
=== District court service ===
Torruella was nominated by President Gerald Ford on November 18, 1974, to a seat on the United States District Court for the District of Puerto Rico vacated by Judge Hiram Rafael Cancio. He was confirmed by the United States Senate on December 18, 1974, and received his commission two days later. He served as chief judge from 1982 to 1984. His service was terminated on October 30, 1984, due to his elevation to the First Circuit.

In 1979, Torruella was the judge in various criminal trespass cases against demonstrators who entered a beach in Vieques to protest its use by the U.S. Navy. Torruella ordered that the demonstrators receive separate trials. Some defendants were sentenced to prison; others received six-month suspended sentences. Some of the demonstrators were radical pro-independence advocates and refused to acknowledge the federal court's jurisdiction or to defend themselves at trial. The Vieques cases were the highest-profile of Torruella's cases over his decade as a district judge.

=== Court of appeals service ===
Torruella was nominated by President Ronald Reagan on August 1, 1984, to the United States Court of Appeals for the First Circuit, to a new seat created by 98 Stat. 333. He was confirmed by the Senate on October 3, 1984 by voice vote. He received his commission the following day, becoming the first Puerto Rican to serve on the circuit court bench. José A. Fusté replaced Torruella on the district bench.

Torruella served as chief judge of the First Circuit from 1994 to 2001. Although his length of service entitled him to assume senior status, Torruella chose to remain a judge on active service and continued to hear cases until his death in 2020.

==== Notable decisions and work ====
Torruella was consistently an advocate of Puerto Rican rights. He dissented from a 2005 ruling en banc First Circuit decision that Puerto Ricans are properly denied a voice in the election of the president of the United States because Puerto Rico is not a state. In August 2017, Torruella wrote a lengthy dissent when the en banc circuit rejected a lawsuit challenging Puerto Rico's exclusion from congressional apportionment. Torruella wrote the book The Supreme Court and Puerto Rico: The Doctrine of Separate and Unequal (University of Puerto Rico: 1988), a study of the Supreme Court's decisions in the Insular Cases, in which Torruella argues that "colonial rule and the indignities of second-class citizenship can be ended not, as in the case of the Philippines, by granting the colony its independence ... but rather, by securing for Puerto Rico equality under American law" including Puerto Rican statehood. The book was favorably reviewed by Judge José A. Cabranes in the Harvard Law Review. In a 2018 article, Torruella argued that "Puerto Rico's colonial relationship to the United States throughout the United States' various 'experiments' with Puerto Rico and its people, although variously labeled for political purposes and constitutionally denominated an 'unincorporated territory,' has merely perpetuated the inherent inequality of the United States citizens who reside in Puerto Rico as compared to the rest of the nation, and is the major cause of the Island's economic crisis."

Torruella authored the First Circuit opinion in Planned Parenthood of Northern New England v. Heed (2004), in which the court upheld the district court's decision declaring New Hampshire's "parental notification" abortion law unconstitutional, and enjoining its enforcement. The decision held that the state law was inconsistent with the Constitution and relevant Supreme Court constitutional decisions in Roe v. Wade, Stenberg v. Carhart, and Planned Parenthood of Southeastern Pennsylvania v. Casey. The case later went to the Supreme Court in Ayotte v. Planned Parenthood of Northern New England (2006).

In 2009, Torruella wrote the opinion in Noonan v. Staples, Inc., allowing a suit for libel to proceed because even though the statements at issue were true they reflected "actual malice." (Under the law in Massachusetts and elsewhere in the U.S., truth is usually an absolute defense to libel, but Massachusetts law contains an exception if the defendant made the statement with "actual malice.") Torruella's decision did not decide the question of whether this exception was inconsistent with the Constitution's First Amendment because the argument was raised too late in the proceedings. A Harvard Law Review comment indicated that "the court's analysis serves as an indication that, had the constitutional claim been appropriately asserted, the law would not have survived."

In 2011, Torruella participated in the published First Circuit opinion ACEMLA de Puerto Rico, Inc. v. Curet-Velázquez, a copyright dispute involving rights associated with musical compositions connected to Puerto Rican composer Tite Curet Alonso.

In 2012, Torruella joined a unanimous First Circuit panel decision (written by Judge Michael Boudin) in Massachusetts v. United States Department of Health and Human Services. The decision struck down section 3 of the Defense of Marriage Act (DOMA), which denied federal benefits to all same-sex couples, even those legally married under state law.

In 2015, Torruella dissented from a First Circuit decision denying Dzhokhar Tsarnaev's request for a writ of mandamus compelling the district court to grant a change of venue of Tsarnaev's trial due to widespread pretrial publicity. In July 2020, Torruella joined the opinion of Judge O. Rogeriee Thompson in vacating the federal death sentence of convicted Boston Marathon bomber Dzhokhar Tsarnaev, on the basis of legal errors in the sentencing proceedings. The First Circuit remanded to the district court for a new penalty phase. In a concurring opinion, Torruella wrote that he would have gone further to hold that the district court's denials of Tsarnaev's motions for change of venue were an abuse of discretion that "denied Tsarnaev the right to a fair trial and sentencing determination," given the huge media coverage of the bombing in the Boston area. Torruella cited the precedent in the trial of Timothy McVeigh for the Oklahoma City bombing, in which a change of venue to Denver was granted.

In June 2020, Torruella wrote for the unanimous panel when it found that Nestlé's chocolate wrappers did not need to disclose if they were made from cocoa production in Ivory Coast using forced child labor.

== Sailing career ==
Torruella competed for Puerto Rico in four Olympic sailing events:

- 1964: Enoshima in the Finn (31st)
- 1968: Acapulco in the Flying Dutchman (28th)
- 1972: Kiel in the Flying Dutchman (27th)
- 1976: Kingston in the Soling (22nd)

Torruella was captain of the Puerto Rican team in each of the four Olympics. He also competed in the 1975 and 1979 Pan American Games. In the 1984 Summer Olympic Games in Los Angeles, Torruella served as a coach; he was informed of his appointment to the First Circuit while coaching in summer 1984.

As a yachtsman, Torruella made several long-distance sea voyages, including two trans-Atlantic crossings in 1992, on the 500th anniversary of Columbus's first voyage; a few years later, Torruella undertook an 8,000-mile sailing trip across the Caribbean Sea and Panama Canal to the Pacific Ocean, where he visited the Galápagos Islands and Puerto Montt, Chile, before traveling to Buenos Aires, Argentina, via Cape Horn.

== Personal life and death ==
Torruella met his wife, Judith (Judy) Wirt in 1955 and had two sons (including fellow Puerto Rican Olympic sailor Juan Jr.), two daughters, eight grandchildren, and numerous great-grandchildren. Torruella died on October 26, 2020, in San Juan, Puerto Rico, from a massive heart attack, at the age of 87.

== Publications ==
- The Supreme Court and Puerto Rico: The Doctrine of Separate and Unequal, Río Piedras: University of Puerto Rico, 1988, ISBN 0-8477-3019-0
- "The Insular Cases: The Establishment of a Regime of Political Apartheid" (PDF), University of Pennsylvania Journal of International Law, 29 (2): 284–320, 2007, archived from the original (PDF) on August 8, 2019

== See also ==
- List of United States federal judges by longevity of service
- List of Hispanic and Latino American jurists
- List of Puerto Ricans

== Sources ==
Legal offices
Preceded by Hiram Rafael Cancio	Judge of the United States District Court for the District of Puerto Rico; 1974–1984	Succeeded by José A. Fusté
Preceded by Hernan Gregorio Pesquera	Chief Judge of the United States District Court for the District of Puerto Rico; 1982–1984	Succeeded by Juan Pérez-Giménez
Preceded by Seat established by 98 Stat. 333	Judge of the United States Court of Appeals for the First Circuit; 1984–2020	Succeeded by Gustavo Gelpí
Preceded by Stephen Breyer	Chief Judge of the United States Court of Appeals for the First Circuit; 1994–2001	Succeeded by Michael Boudin
