= Jose V. Toledo Federal Building and United States Courthouse =

Historic building located in Old San Juan, Puerto Rico

- U.S. Post Office and Courthouse
- U.S. National Register of Historic Places
- U.S. National Historic Landmark District – Contributing property
- Puerto Rico Historic Sites and Zones
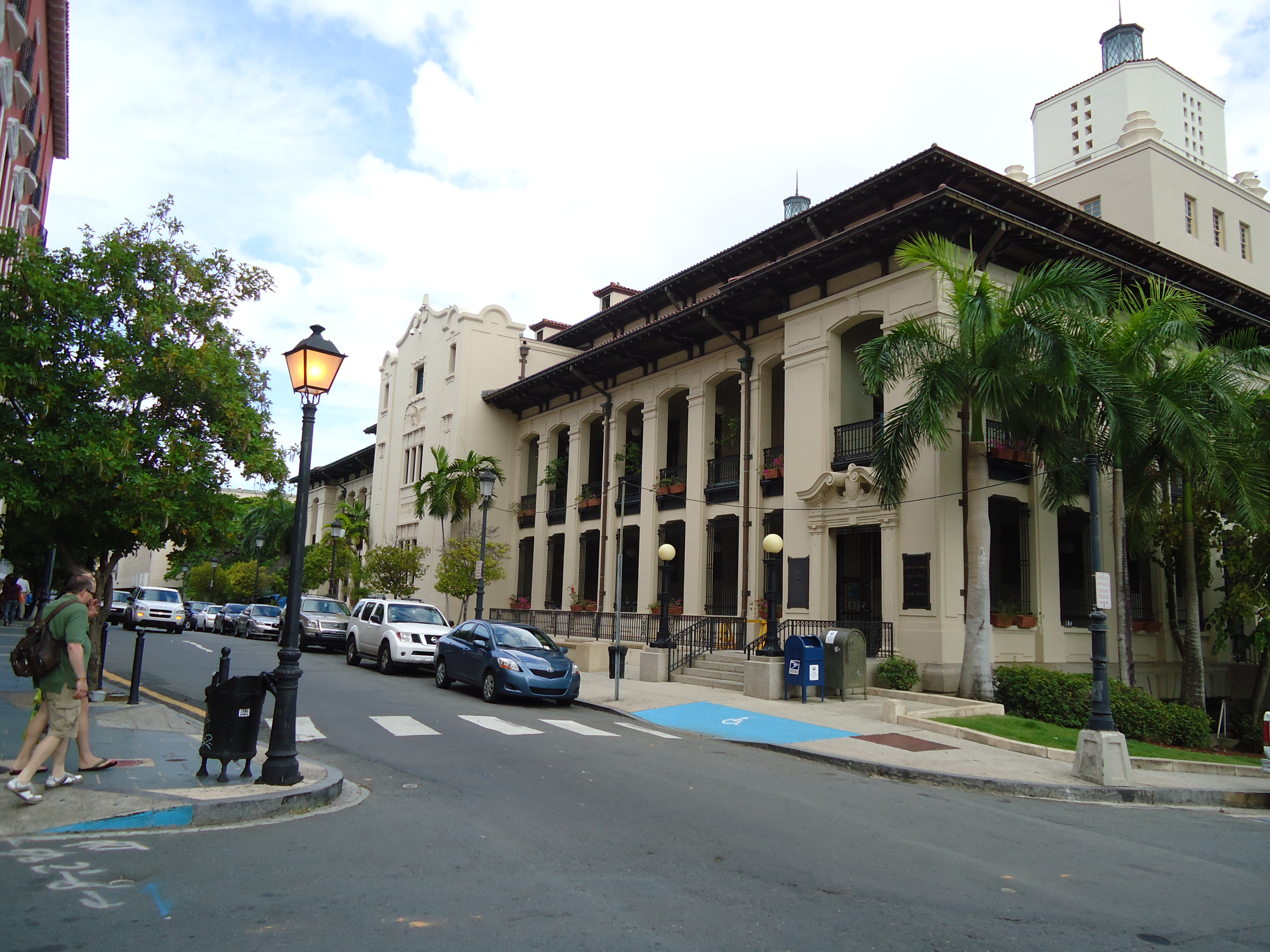
- Jose V. Toledo Federal Building and U.S. Courthouse

- Location within Puerto Rico
- Location: Block bounded by Calle San Justo, Calle Tanca, Calle Commercio, and Calle Recinto Sur, Old San Juan, Puerto Rico
- Coordinates: 18°27′50″N 66°06′53″W
- Area: 1 acre (0.40 ha)
- Built: 1914
- Architect: Wenderoth, Oscar
- Architectural style: Spanish Colonial Revival, Streamline Moderne, and mixed (more Than 2 Styles From Different Periods)
- Part of: Old San Juan Historic District
- NRHP reference No.: 87000694
- RNSZH No.: 2000-(RMSJ)-00-JP-SH

Significant dates
- Added to NRHP: March 28, 1988
- Designated RNSZH: February 3, 2000

The Jose V. Toledo Federal Building and United States Courthouse is a historic post office and courthouse located at Old San Juan, Puerto Rico. It is a courthouse for the United States District Court for the District of Puerto Rico. It is also the site for oral argument before the United States Court of Appeals for the First Circuit, when that court sits in Puerto Rico.

== Building history ==
The courthouse was designed to provide suitable accommodations for important government offices and to demonstrate the commitment of the United States to the Island of Puerto Rico. From the initial settlement of San Juan, this harbor side site has been critical to the city's defense and economic development. Initially, portions of the site contained a Spanish fortification, the Bastion de San Justo del Muelle, which was built in 1639 (shortly after the city was invaded by the Dutch) and remained in place until 1897. The southern portion of the site contained a building that was likely a Spanish custom house constructed during the 1830s.

In 1898, the U.S. Government took possession of Puerto Rico and established a presence on the island. When the United States established a governance structure for Puerto Rico in 1900, the need for public buildings became apparent.

The structure is composed of two distinct but connected buildings. The first building of the complex was designed between 1906 and 1908 by the Office of the Supervising Architect of the Department of the Treasury, led by James Knox Taylor. Constructed between 1911 and 1914, it was the island's first significant federal building. In 1936, an addition was proposed to accommodate New Deal programs created in response to the Great Depression. Congress authorized the expansion the same year, and plans were completed by the Department of the Treasury's Public Buildings Branch under Supervising Architect Louis A. Simon in 1938. Construction of the addition was completed in 1940. It is a substantial building that was designed independently of the earlier building, although the two are physically connected on the south facade of the 1914 building.

In 1986 the building was listed in the National Register of Historic Places and on the Puerto Rico Register of Historic Sites and Zones in 2000. In 1999 the building was renamed for Jose Victor Toledo. Toledo (1931–1980) served as a justice and chief judge in the U.S. District Court, District of Puerto Rico, from 1970 until his death a decade later.

== Architecture ==
The three-story, 1914 section of the courthouse displays a sophisticated and harmonious blend of the Spanish Colonial Revival style with classically inspired forms and details that reflect both the indigenous architecture of Puerto Rico and the prevalent style used on federal government buildings of the era.

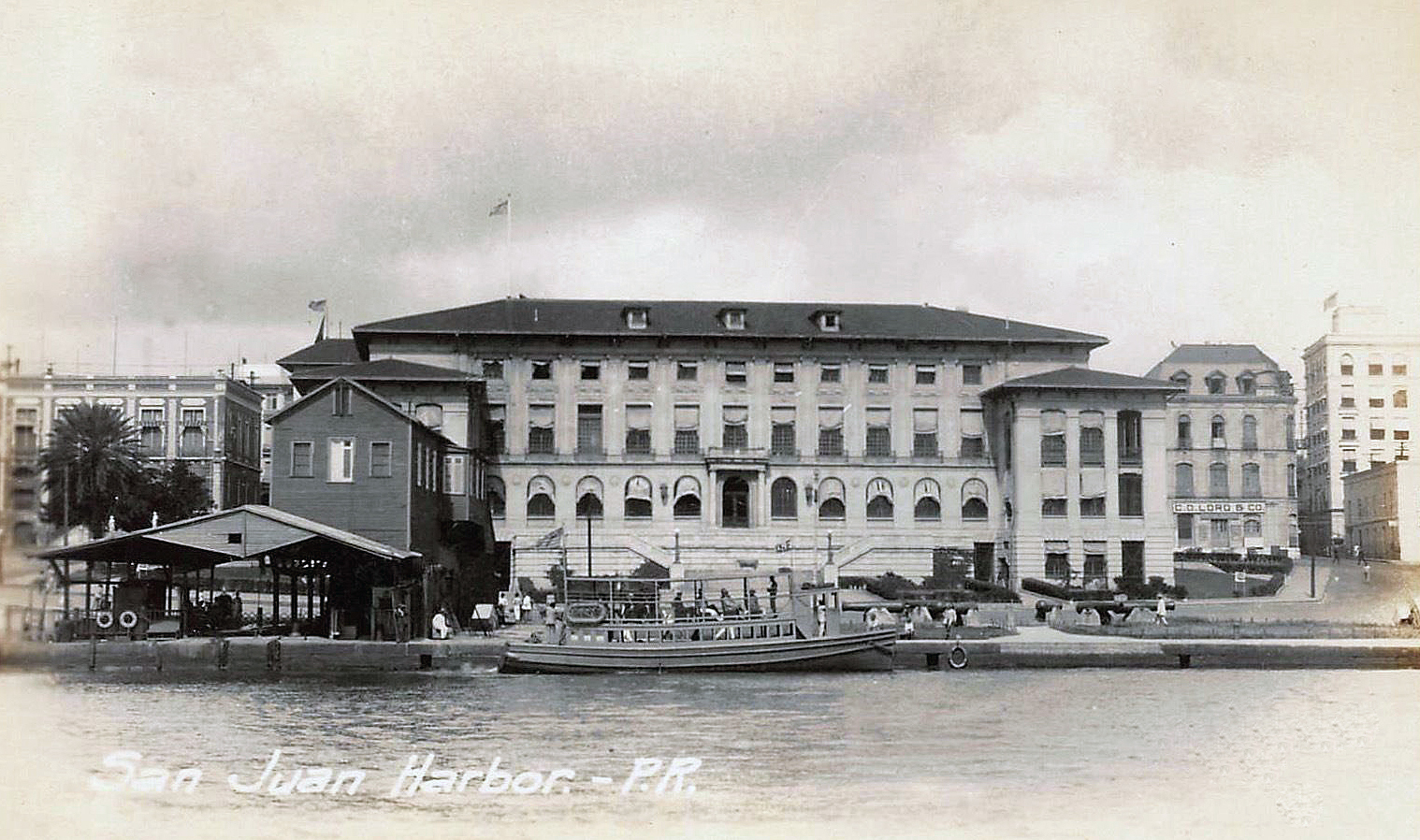
View of original building, circa 1915

The U-shaped structure sits on a foundation of concrete piers and wood piles. Constructed on a site that slopes north to south toward the harbor, it consists of a partially excavated basement, two floors with loggias, and a set-back third floor capped with a Spanish-tile roof.

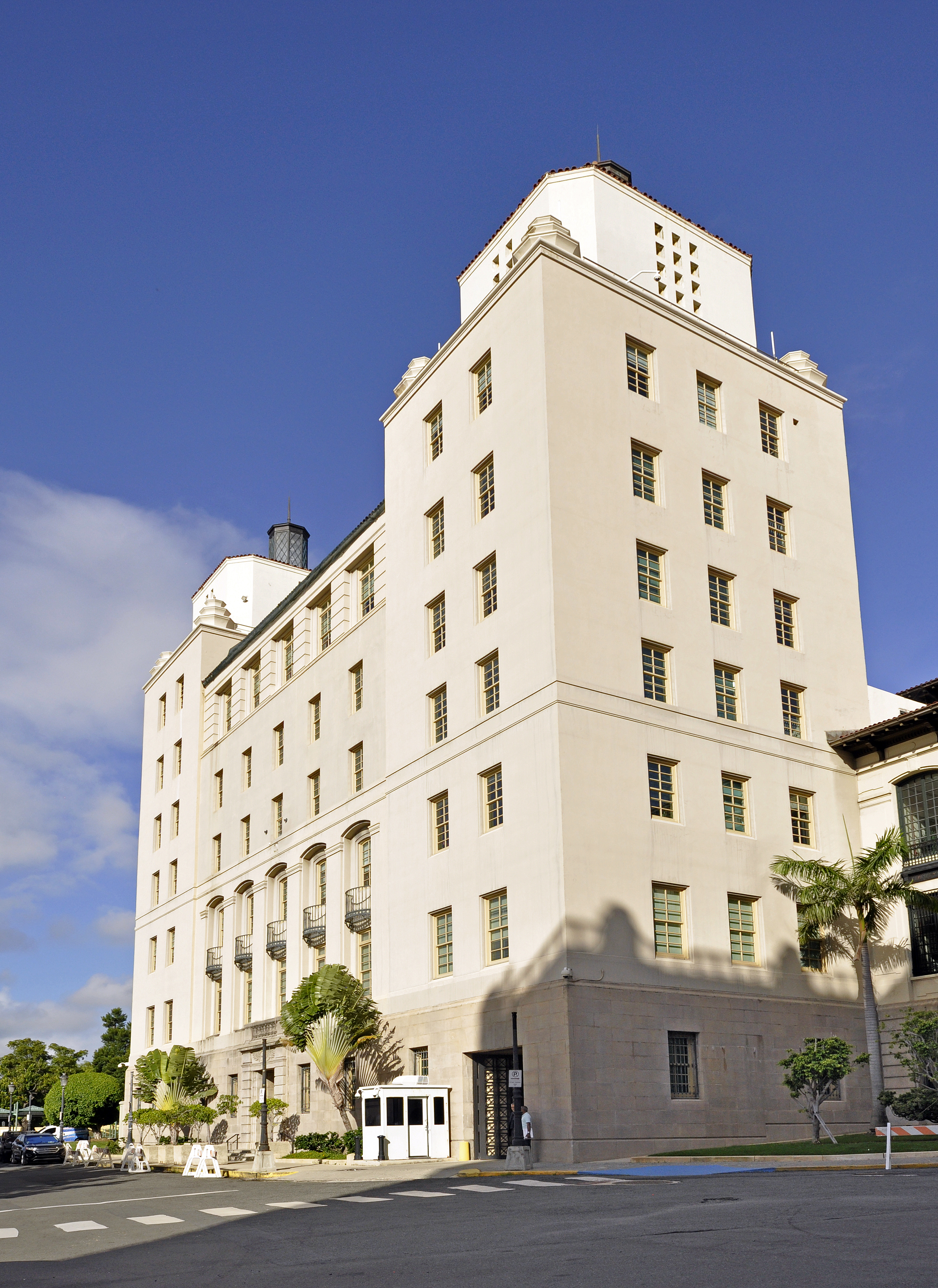
View of 1940 addition

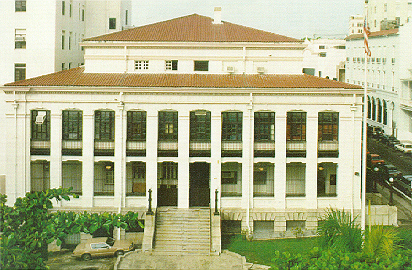

The raised basement is finished with rusticated granite, while the upper floors are constructed of brick and concrete and finished in stucco. The north elevation features a centrally placed, projecting, multi-curved parapet and flanking entry portals. The loggias, hallmarks of the Spanish Colonial Revival Style, provide ventilation and shelter from the weather. The openings are segmentally arched with projecting keystones topping the openings. Classically inspired pilasters divide the openings and are skillfully combined with wrought-iron balusters that are located on the second level. Windows are covered with wrought-iron grilles. The clay tile roof with wide overhanging eaves reflects indigenous architectural influence. Supported by paired brackets and set over the building's ornamental cornice, the eaves provide relief from the hot sun and protect the building from rain.

The 1940 building connects with the earlier building on the south elevation. It covers the building's original grand terraced harbor side entrance and most of its main facade. The simple Streamline Moderne-Art Moderne tower is characteristic of much government architecture of the late 1930s. It contains minimal decorative detailing, but its massing contributes strongly to the building's visual prominence. Rectangular in plan and six stories in height, the 1940 building is constructed of cast-in-place, reinforced concrete. Two towers capped with handsome, four-ton, bronze lanterns, flank the building and extend above the six-story main edifice.

Significant interior spaces of the Jose V. Toledo Federal Building and U.S. Courthouse include, in the 1914 building, a marble-trimmed entrance lobby with a Spanish-inspired white marble imperial staircase, and public corridors of salt-glazed brick with cast-iron ventilator grilles designed to keep the building comfortable in the tropical Puerto Rican climate. The 1940 addition includes a fifth-floor ceremonial courtroom with decorative tile wainscoting and a diamond-pattern cornice. Original 1940s furnishings have been recreated.

In 1996 the U.S. General Services Administration (GSA) commenced a meticulous restoration following the recovery of approximately 16,000 artifacts that were discovered during preliminary archaeological work on the site. The exterior was restored to its 1940 appearance. Historically significant areas were identified for restoration or replacement. The second-story loggia, closed in the late 1940s or early 1950s, was reopened. The six-foot eaves, removed in 1958, were reconstructed. Original ceremonial spaces were restored. The building was reinforced to withstand earthquakes. Wherever possible, original architectural materials were reused rather than replaced, preserving the integrity of the building.

In March 2000 the Society for History in the Federal Government awarded the John Wesley Powell Prize for Excellence in Historic Preservation to GSA for the rehabilitation and restoration work conducted at the building. In 2002 the project received two awards: the Advisory Council on Historic Preservation Chairman's Award for outstanding federal preservation achievement, and the American Institute of Architects New England Charter's Honor Award.

In 2009, GSA began remodeling of the postal spaces for the bankruptcy court support activities and judges chambers, using the architectural firm Perkins Eastman of Pittsburgh and the construction firm Fe-Ri Construction of San Juan.

== Significant events ==
- 1900: U.S. establishes a formal government presence on Puerto Rico and realizes the need for government buildings.
- 1911-1914: Construction of the U.S. Post Office and Courthouse occurs.
- 1938-1940: A major addition is constructed.
- 1940s-1960s: Various renovations occur.
- 1986: The building is listed in the National Register of Historic Places.
- 1996: Restoration work commences.
- 1999: The building is renamed the Jose V. Toledo U.S. Post Office and Courthouse.
- 2000: The restoration project earns the John Wesley Powell Prize for Excellence in Historic Preservation from the Society for History in the Federal Government.
- 2002: Restoration earns Advisory Council on Historic Preservation Chairman's Award and American Institute of Architects New England Chapter's Honor Award.

== Building facts ==
- Architects: James Knox Taylor / Louis A. Simon, both Supervising Architects of the Treasury Department
- Major Restoration Architects & Retrofit: Finegold Alexander & Associates
- Construction Dates: 1911-1914; 1938–1940
- Landmark Status: Listed in the National Register of Historic Places
- Location: The block bounded by Calle Recinto Sur, Calle Tanca, Calle Commercio, and Calle San Justo
- Architectural Style: Spanish Colonial Revival style with classical form and details; Art Moderne
- Primary Materials: Brick and concrete covered with stucco; cast-in-place concrete
- Prominent Features: Twin towers topped by bronze lanterns; two-story wraparound loggia; two-tiered overhang

== See also ==
- National Register of Historic Places listings in metropolitan San Juan, Puerto Rico
- List of United States post offices
