= United States District Court for the District of Puerto Rico =

United States district court in Puerto Rico

- (D.P.R.)
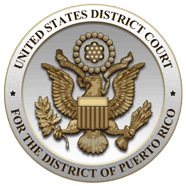
- Location: Clemente Ruiz-Nazario United States Courthouse (San Juan) More locations: Toledo Courthouse (San Juan); Mayagüez; Ponce
- Appeals to: First Circuit
- Established: September 12, 1966
- Judges: 7
- Chief Judge: Raúl M. Arias-Marxuach

Officers of the court
- U.S. Attorney: Héctor E. Ramírez-Carbó
- U.S. Marshal: Wilmer Ocasio
- www.prd.uscourts.gov

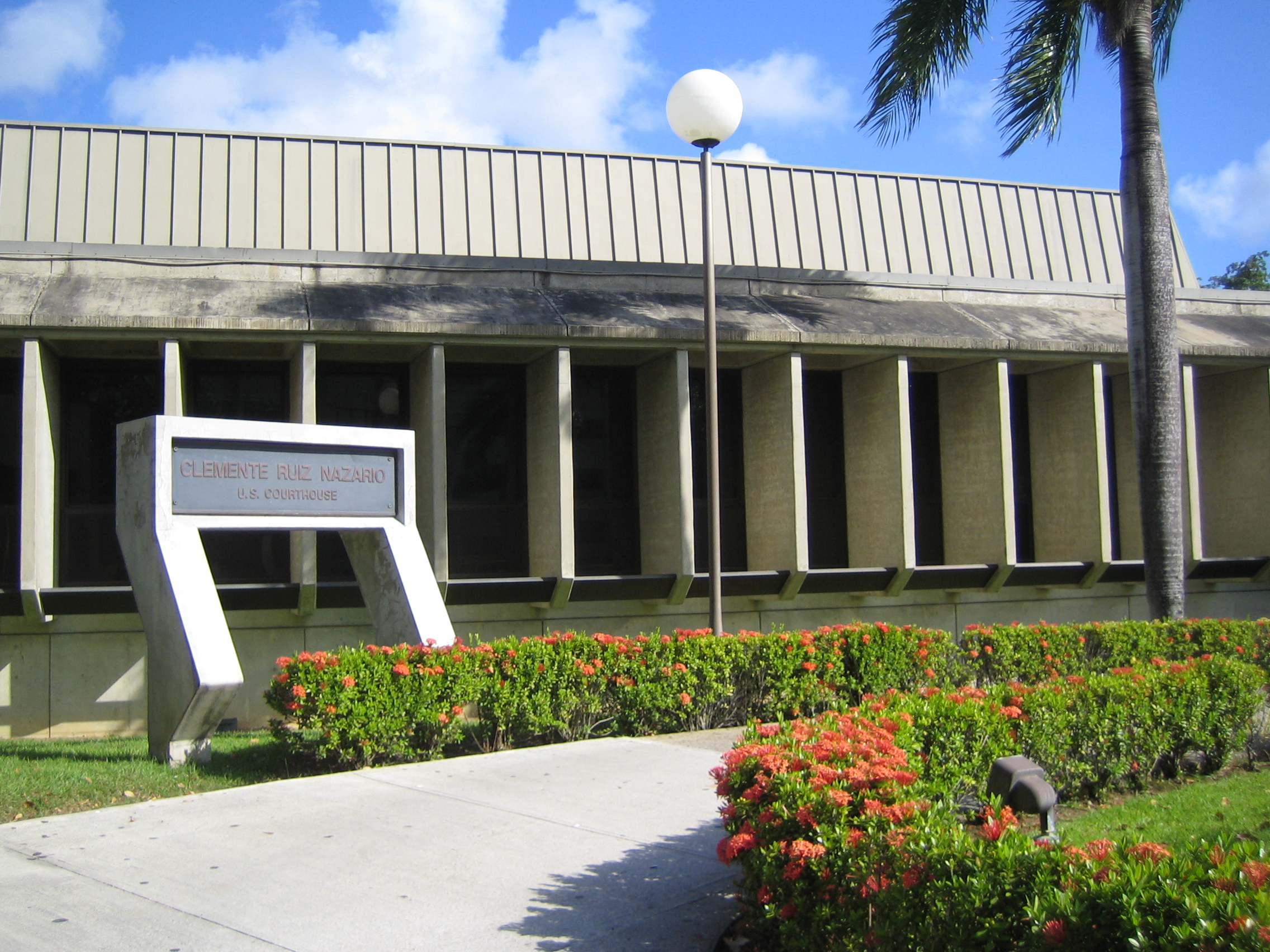
Clemente Ruiz Nazario United States Courthouse, in Hato Rey, P.R.

The United States District Court for the District of Puerto Rico (in case citations, D.P.R.; Spanish: Tribunal del Distrito de Puerto Rico) is the federal district court whose jurisdiction comprises the Commonwealth of Puerto Rico. The court is based in San Juan. The main building is the Clemente Ruiz Nazario United States Courthouse located in the Hato Rey district of San Juan. The magistrate judges are located in the adjacent Federico Degetau Federal Building, and several senior district judges hold court at the Jose V. Toledo Federal Building and U.S. Courthouse in Old San Juan. The old courthouse also houses the U.S. Bankruptcy Court. Most appeals from this court are heard by the United States Court of Appeals for the First Circuit, which is headquartered in Boston but hears appeals at the Old San Juan courthouse for two sessions each year. Patent claims as well as claims against the U.S. government under the Tucker Act are appealed to the Federal Circuit.

The current acting United States attorney is Héctor E. Ramírez-Carbó.

== Scope and relevance ==
The United States first established a federal court in Puerto Rico under the Foraker Act of 1900. This court was a territorial court, operating within what the Supreme Court would soon define in the Insular Cases as an unincorporated territory of the United States. As such, the court was established under Article IV rather than Article III of the United States Constitution. The Supreme Court of the United States discussed the nature of the court in Balzac v. Porto Rico, 258 U.S. 298 (1922). Because the court was a territorial court rather than a full-fledged District Court, its judges did not enjoy Article III protections such as life tenure.

The District Court in Puerto Rico continued to be an Article IV court even after Puerto Rico attained its commonwealth status. However, in 1966, the 89th United States Congress conferred life tenure on the federal judges of Puerto Rico, transforming the court into a full-fledged Article III district court with the same status as the other United States District Courts throughout the country. The congressional report on the bill making this change described the change of status as being "appropriate in light of the court's caseload and the conferral of Commonwealth status on Puerto Rico," and also explained:

There is no reason why the U.S. District Judges for the District of Puerto Rico should not be placed in a position of parity as to tenure with all other Federal Judges throughout our judicial system. Moreover, federal litigants in Puerto Rico should not be denied the benefit of judges made independent by life tenure from the pressures of those who might influence his chances of reappointment, which benefits the Constitution guarantees to the litigants in all other Federal Courts. These judges in Puerto Rico have and will have the exacting same heavy responsibilities as all other Federal district judges and, therefore, they should have the same independence, security, and retirement benefits to which all other Federal district judges are entitled.

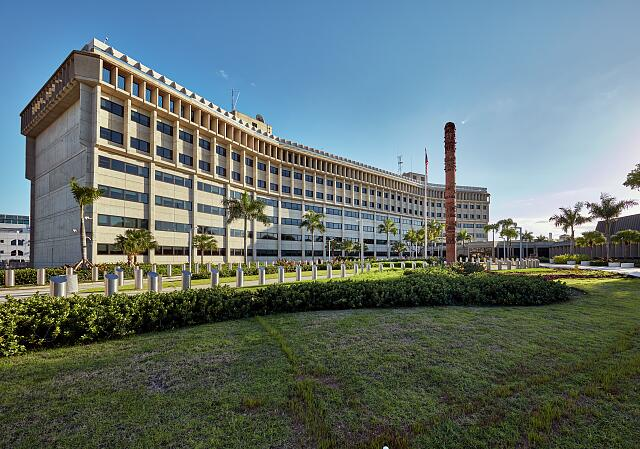
Federico Degetau Federal Building

See 1966 U.S.C.C.A.N. 2786–90; see also Examining Bd. of Engineers Architects and Surveyors v. Flores de Otero, 426 U.S. 572, 595 n.26 (1976) ("The reason given for this [law] was that the Federal District Court in Puerto Rico 'is in its jurisdiction, powers, and responsibilities the same as the U.S. district courts in the (several) states'."). This important change in the federal judicial structure of the island was implemented not as a request of the Commonwealth government, but rather at the repeated request of the Judicial Conference of the United States. See Senate Report No. 1504, 1966 U.S.C.C.A.N. 2786–90.

No similar law has been passed for the three insular territories that still have Article IV status, though there have been calls from time to time that these judges also deserve the protection of life tenure.

== Current judges ==
As of January 2, 2024:

| # | Title | Judge | Duty station | Born | Term of service | | | Appointed by |
| # | Title | Judge | Duty station | Born | Active | Chief | Senior | Appointed by |
|---|---|---|---|---|---|---|---|---|
| 20 | Chief Judge | Raúl M. Arias-Marxuach | San Juan | 1967 | 2019–present | 2021–present | — | Trump |
| 16 | District Judge | Aida Delgado-Colón | San Juan | 1955 | 2006–present | 2011–2018 | — | G.W. Bush |
| 19 | District Judge | Pedro Delgado Hernández | San Juan | 1956 | 2014–present | — | — | Obama |
| 21 | District Judge | Silvia Carreño-Coll | San Juan | 1963 | 2020–present | — | — | Trump |
| 22 | District Judge | María Antongiorgi-Jordán | San Juan | 1967 | 2022–present | — | — | Biden |
| 23 | District Judge | Camille Vélez-Rivé | San Juan | 1968 | 2022–present | — | — | Biden |
| 24 | District Judge | Gina R. Méndez-Miró | San Juan | 1974 | 2023–present | — | — | Biden |
| 15 | Senior Judge | Jay A. García-Gregory | San Juan | 1944 | 2000–2018 | — | 2018–present | Clinton |
| 18 | Senior Judge | Francisco Besosa | San Juan | 1949 | 2006–2022 | — | 2022–present | G.W. Bush |

== Former judges ==
| # | Judge | Born–died | Active service | Chief Judge | Senior status | Appointed by | Reason for termination |
|---|---|---|---|---|---|---|---|
| 1 | Hiram Rafael Cancio | 1920–2008 | 1967–1974 | 1967–1974 | — | L. Johnson | resignation |
| 2 | Juan B. Fernandez-Badillo | 1912–1989 | 1967–1972 | — | 1972–1989 | L. Johnson | death |
| 3 | José Victor Toledo | 1931–1980 | 1970–1980 | 1974–1980 | — | Nixon | death |
| 4 | Hernan Gregorio Pesquera | 1924–1982 | 1972–1982 | 1980–1982 | — | Nixon | death |
| 5 | Juan R. Torruella | 1933–2020 | 1974–1984 | 1982–1984 | — | Ford | elevation |
| 6 | Juan Pérez-Giménez | 1941–2020 | 1979–2006 | 1984–1991 | 2006–2020 | Carter | death |
| 7 | Gilberto Gierbolini-Ortiz | 1926–2009 | 1980–1993 | 1991–1993 | 1993–2004 | Carter | retirement |
| 8 | Carmen Consuelo Cerezo | 1940–present | 1980–2021 | 1993–1999 | — | Carter | retirement |
| 9 | Jaime Pieras Jr. | 1924–2011 | 1982–1993 | — | 1993–2011 | Reagan | death |
| 10 | Raymond L. Acosta | 1925–2014 | 1982–1994 | — | 1994–2014 | Reagan | death |
| 11 | Hector Manuel Laffitte | 1934–present | 1983–2005 | 1999–2004 | 2005–2007 | Reagan | retirement |
| 12 | José A. Fusté | 1943–present | 1985–2016 | 2004–2011 | — | Reagan | retirement |
| 13 | Salvador E. Casellas | 1935–2017 | 1994–2005 | — | 2005–2017 | Clinton | death |
| 14 | Daniel R. Domínguez | 1945–present | 1994–2011 | — | 2011–2024 | Clinton | retirement |
| 17 | Gustavo Gelpí | 1965–present | 2006–2021 | 2018–2021 | — | G.W. Bush | elevation |

== Chief judges ==
Chief Judge
| Cancio | 1967–1974 |
| Toledo | 1974–1980 |
| Pesquera | 1980–1982 |
| Torruella | 1982–1984 |
| Pérez-Giménez | 1984–1991 |
| Gierbolini-Ortiz | 1991–1993 |
| Cerezo | 1993–1999 |
| Laffitte | 1999–2004 |
| Fusté | 2004–2011 |
| Delgado-Colón | 2011–2018 |
| Gelpí | 2018–2021 |
| Arias-Marxuach | 2021–present |

Chief judges have administrative responsibilities with respect to their district court. Unlike the Supreme Court, where one justice is specifically nominated to be chief, the office of chief judge rotates among the district court judges. To be chief, a judge must have been in active service on the court for at least one year, be under the age of 65, and have not previously served as chief judge.

A vacancy is filled by the judge highest in seniority among the group of qualified judges. The chief judge serves for a term of seven years, or until age 70, whichever occurs first. The age restrictions are waived if no members of the court would otherwise be qualified for the position.

When the office was created in 1948, the chief judge was the longest-serving judge who had not elected to retire, on what has since 1958 been known as senior status, or declined to serve as chief judge. After August 6, 1959, judges could not become or remain chief after turning 70 years old. The current rules have been in operation since October 1, 1982.

== Succession of seats ==
Seat 1
Seat established on September 12, 1966 by 80 Stat. 764
| Cancio | 1967–1974 |
| Torruella | 1974–1984 |
| Fuste | 1985–2016 |
| Arias-Marxuach | 2019–present |

Seat 2
Seat established on September 12, 1966 by 80 Stat. 764
| Fernandez-Badillo | 1967–1972 |
| Pesquera | 1972–1982 |
| Laffitte | 1983–2005 |
| Gelpí | 2006–2021 |
| Antongiorgi-Jordán | 2022–present |

Seat 3
Seat established on June 2, 1970 by 84 Stat. 294
| Toledo | 1970–1980 |
| Acosta | 1982–1994 |
| García-Gregory | 2000–2018 |
| Carreño-Coll | 2020–present |

Seat 4
Seat established on October 20, 1978 by 92 Stat. 1629
| Perez-Gimenez | 1979–2006 |
| Besosa | 2006–2022 |
| Vélez-Rivé | 2022–present |

Seat 5
Seat established on October 20, 1978 by 92 Stat. 1629
| Gierbolini-Ortiz | 1980–1993 |
| Domínguez | 1994–2011 |
| Delgado Hernández | 2014–present |

Seat 6
Seat established on October 20, 1978 by 92 Stat. 1629
| Cerezo | 1980–2021 |
| Méndez-Miró | 2023–present |

Seat 7
Seat established on October 20, 1978 by 92 Stat. 1629
| Pieras, Jr. | 1982–1993 |
| Casellas | 1994–2005 |
| Delgado-Colón | 2006–present |

== Article IV judges ==
Judges who served on the Court from 1900 to 1966, before it became an Article III court, were:

- William H. Holt (1900–1904)
- Charles F. McKenna (1904–1906)
- Bernard Shandon Rodey (1906–1910)
- John J. Jenkins (1910–1911)
- Paul Charlton (1911–1913)
- Peter J. Hamilton (1913–1921)
- Arthur F. Odlin (1921–1925)
- Ira K. Wells (1925–1933)
- Robert A. Cooper (1933–1947)
- David Chávez (1947–1950)
- Thomas H. Roberts (1950–1952)
- Clemente Ruiz-Nazario (1952–1966)
- Hiram Rafael Cáncio (1965–1966)

During this period, judges for the District of Puerto Rico were appointed by the president for 4-year terms until 1938, and thereafter for 8-year terms. The court statutorily comprised a single judge until 1961, when a second judgeship was authorized by Congress, although the position was not actually filled until 1965. Until the 1950s, when the District Court judgeship was vacant, when the judge was away from Puerto Rico, or when the court's docket became overly backlogged, sitting judges of the Supreme Court of Puerto Rico were designated to act as judges of the federal court.

Judge Ruiz-Nazario, appointed by President Harry Truman in 1952, was the first Puerto Rican to serve as a judge of Puerto Rico's federal court.

== See also ==
- Courts of the United States
- Federal tribunals in the United States
- List of current United States district judges
- List of United States federal courthouses in Puerto Rico
- United States District Court
