= Juan B. Fernandez-Badillo =

U.S. federal judge (1912–1989)

Senior Judge of the United States District Court for the District of Puerto Rico
- In office June 30, 1972 – October 16, 1989

Judge of the United States District Court for the District of Puerto Rico
- In office October 12, 1967 – June 30, 1972
- Appointed by: Lyndon B. Johnson
- Preceded by: Seat established by 80 Stat. 764
- Succeeded by: Hernan Gregorio Pesquera

Secretary of Justice of Puerto Rico
- In office 1957–1958
- Governor: Luis Muñoz Marín
- Preceded by: José Trías Monge
- Succeeded by: Hiram Rafael Cancio

Personal details
- Born: Juan B. Fernandez-Badillo; August 28, 1912 Aguadilla, Puerto Rico
- Died: October 16, 1989 (aged 77) Guaynabo, Puerto Rico
- Education: University of Puerto Rico (BA, LLB)

Juan B. Fernandez-Badillo (August 28, 1912 – October 16, 1989) was a United States district judge of the United States District Court for the District of Puerto Rico.

== Education and career ==
Born in Aguadilla, Puerto Rico, Fernandez-Badillo received a Bachelor of Arts degree from the University of Puerto Rico in 1942 and a Bachelor of Laws from the University of Puerto Rico School of Law in 1945. He entered public service in the office of the Commonwealth Attorney General of Puerto Rico, first as an assistant from 1947 to 1952, then as acting Attorney General from 1952 to 1953, then as a deputy from 1953 to 1956, and finally appointed as the Secretary of Justice of Puerto Rico by governor Luis Muñoz Marín from 1957 to 1958. He was acting Governor of Puerto Rico in 1958, and was thereafter the Solicitor General of Puerto Rico from 1959 to 1967.

== Federal judicial service ==
In 1966, the United States Congress passed an act reorganizing the United States District Court for the District of Puerto Rico as an Article III court, with the judges thereof having life tenure and salary protection. Fernandez-Badillo was nominated by President Lyndon B. Johnson on September 18, 1967, to the United States District Court for the District of Puerto Rico, to a new seat authorized by 80 Stat. 764. He was confirmed by the United States Senate on October 12, 1967, and received his commission the same day. He assumed senior status due to a certified disability on June 30, 1972. His service terminated on October 16, 1989, due to his death.

== See also ==
- List of Hispanic and Latino American jurists

== Sources ==
Legal offices
Preceded by Seat established by 80 Stat. 764	Judge of the United States District Court for the District of Puerto Rico; 1967–1972	Succeeded by Hernan Gregorio Pesquera
Preceded by José Trías Monge	Secretary of Justice of Puerto Rico; 1957–1958	Succeeded by Hiram Rafael Cancio
