= Hiram Rafael Cancio =

Puerto Rican judge (1920–2008)

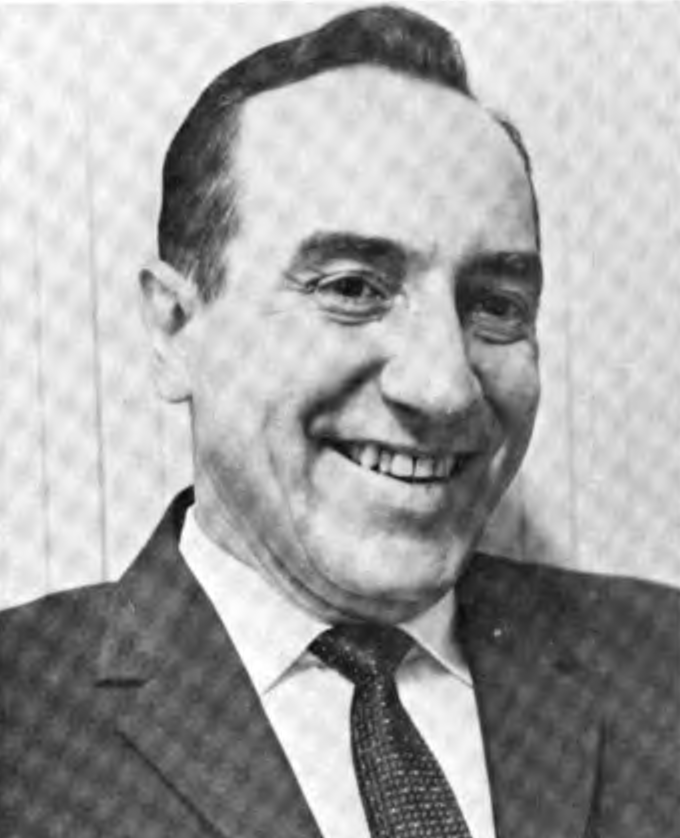

Chief Judge of the United States District Court for the District of Puerto Rico
- In office 1967–1974
- Preceded by: Office established
- Succeeded by: Jose Victor Toledo

Judge of the United States District Court for the District of Puerto Rico
- In office June 12, 1967 – January 31, 1974
- Appointed by: Lyndon B. Johnson
- Preceded by: Seat established by 80 Stat. 764
- Succeeded by: Juan R. Torruella

Secretary of Justice of Puerto Rico
- In office 1959–1965
- Governor: Luis Muñoz Marín
- Preceded by: Juan B. Fernandez-Badillo
- Succeeded by: Rafael Hernández Colón

Personal details
- Born: Hiram Rafael Cancio Vilella; August 26, 1920 San Sebastian, Puerto Rico
- Died: December 16, 2008 (aged 88) San Juan, Puerto Rico
- Education: University of Puerto Rico (BA); University of Puerto Rico School of Law (LLB)

Hiram Rafael Cancio (August 26, 1920 – December 16, 2008) was a United States district judge of the United States District Court for the District of Puerto Rico.

== Education and career ==
Born Hiram Rafael Cancio Vilella (Note: Born with a Spanish style dual surname, Cancio dropped his second (maternal) surname, retaining his first (paternal) surname, at some point in his life prior to his appointment to the federal bench.) in San Sebastian, Puerto Rico, Cancio received a Bachelor of Arts degree from the University of Puerto Rico in 1942. He received a Bachelor of Laws from the University of Puerto Rico School of Law in 1948. He was a member of Phi Sigma Alpha fraternity. He served as a Sergeant in the United States Army from 1944 to 1946 and after his discharge became a vocational advisor and psychometriest with the Veterans Administration in San Juan, Puerto Rico from 1946 to 1947. He was a trial examiner for the Puerto Rico Labor Relations Board in San Juan in 1948. He was Chief of the Legal Division of the Puerto Rico Labor Relations Board in San Juan from 1949 to 1952. He was Chairman of the Wage and Hours Commission under the Fair Labor Standards Act for the United States Department of Labor from 1952 to 1958. He was Director of the Labor Relations Institute at the University of Puerto Rico from 1952 to 1955. He was Dean of Administration at the University of Puerto Rico from 1955 to 1959. He was a Professor of Labor Relations and Labor Law at the University of Puerto Rico from 1952 to 1965. He was Commonwealth Attorney General of Puerto Rico from 1959 to 1962. He was Commonwealth Secretary of Justice of Puerto Rico from 1962 to 1965.

== Federal judicial service ==
Cancio served as a District Judge of the United States District Court for the District of Puerto Rico, then an Article IV territorial court, from 1965 to 1967, appointed to a term of eight years.

In 1966, the United States Congress passed an act reorganizing the United States District Court for the District of Puerto Rico as an Article III court, with the judges thereof having life tenure and salary protection. Cancio was nominated by President Lyndon B. Johnson on January 16, 1967, to the United States District Court for the District of Puerto Rico, to a new seat authorized by 80 Stat. 764. He was confirmed by the United States Senate on June 12, 1967, and received his commission on June 12, 1967. He served as Chief Judge from 1967 to 1974. His service terminated on January 31, 1974, due to his resignation.

== Post judicial service and death ==
After his resignation from the federal bench, Cancio engaged in the private practice of law. He died on December 16, 2008.

== See also ==
- List of Hispanic and Latino American jurists

== Sources ==
- "NARA - AAD - Display Full Records - Electronic Army Serial Number Merged File, ca. 1938 – 1946 (Enlistment Records)". aad.archives.gov.
- Guillermo A. Baralt, History of the Federal Court in Puerto Rico: 1899-1999 (2004) (also published in Spanish as Historia del Tribunal Federal de Puerto Rico)

Legal offices
Preceded by Seat established by 80 Stat. 764	Judge of the United States District Court for the District of Puerto Rico; 1967–1974	Succeeded by Juan R. Torruella
Preceded by Office established	Chief Judge of the United States District Court for the District of Puerto Rico; 1967–1974	Succeeded by Jose Victor Toledo
Preceded by Juan B. Fernandez-Badillo	Secretary of Justice of Puerto Rico; 1959–1965	Succeeded by Rafael Hernández Colón
