= José Victor Toledo =

U.S. federal judge in Puerto Rico

Chief Judge of the United States District Court for the District of Puerto Rico
- In office 1974–1980
- Preceded by: Hiram Rafael Cancio
- Succeeded by: Hernan Gregorio Pesquera

Judge of the United States District Court for the District of Puerto Rico
- In office December 1, 1970 – February 3, 1980
- Appointed by: Richard Nixon
- Preceded by: Seat established by 84 Stat. 294
- Succeeded by: Raymond L. Acosta

Personal details
- Born: José Victor Toledo; August 14, 1931 Arecibo, Puerto Rico
- Died: February 3, 1980 (aged 48)
- Education: University of Florida (BA); University of Puerto Rico School of Law (LLB)

Military service
- Allegiance: United States
- Branch/service: United States Army
- Years of service: 1956–1960
- Rank: First lieutenant
- Unit: J.A.G. Corps

José Victor Toledo (August 14, 1931 – February 3, 1980) was a United States district judge of the United States District Court for the District of Puerto Rico.

== Education and career ==
Born in Arecibo, Puerto Rico, Toledo did his secondary studies at Colegio San José, received a Bachelor of Arts degree from the University of Florida in 1952 and a Bachelor of Laws from the University of Puerto Rico School of Law in 1955. He was a district judge of the Puerto Rico District Court in 1956. He was a First Lieutenant in the United States Army from 1956 to 1960 as a member of the Judge Advocate General's Corps, United States Army stationed at Fort Brooke in San Juan, Puerto Rico. He was an Assistant United States Attorney for the District of Puerto Rico from 1960 to 1961, entering private practice in San Juan from 1961 to 1970.

== Federal judicial service ==
On November 16, 1970, Toledo was nominated by President Richard Nixon to a new seat on the United States District Court for the District of Puerto Rico created by 84 Stat. 294. He was confirmed by the United States Senate on November 25, 1970, and received his commission on December 1, 1970. He served as Chief Judge from 1974 until his death on February 3, 1980.

== Honor and burial ==
In 1999, the Jose V. Toledo Federal Building and United States Courthouse at San Juan was named in his honor. He was buried at the Puerto Rico National Cemetery in Bayamón, Puerto Rico.

== See also ==
- List of Hispanic and Latino American jurists

== Sources ==
Legal offices
Preceded by Seat established by 84 Stat. 294	Judge of the United States District Court for the District of Puerto Rico; 1970–1980	Succeeded by Raymond L. Acosta
Preceded by Hiram Rafael Cancio	Chief Judge of the United States District Court for the District of Puerto Rico; 1974–1980	Succeeded by Hernan Gregorio Pesquera
