= List of Hispanic and Latino American jurists =

Latino Judges

This is a list of Hispanic/Latino Americans who are or were judges, magistrate judges, court commissioners, or administrative law judges. If known, it will be listed if a judge has served on multiple courts.

Judge	Court/agency and years of service (if known)	State/territory	Status
George A. Acero	Sacramento County Superior Court (2021– )	California	active
John Acosta	United States District Court for the District of Oregon (2008– )	Oregon	active
Raymond L. Acosta	United States District Court for the District of Puerto Rico (1984–2014)	Puerto Rico	deceased
Rolando Acosta	New York City Civil Court (1997–2002); New York Supreme Court, 1st Judicial District (2002–2008); New York Appellate Division of the Supreme Court, First Judicial Department (2008– )	New York	active
Fernando L. Aenlle-Rocha	Los Angeles County Superior Court (2017–2020); United States District Court for the Central District of California (2020– )	California	active
Charles Edward Aguilar	Stanislaus County Superior Court (1977–1992)	California	deceased
Frank Aguilar	Harris County District Court (2019–2024)	Texas	deceased
Robert Aguilar	Santa Clara County Superior Court (1979–1980); United States District Court for the Northern District of California (1980–1996)	California	deceased
Susan L. Aguilar	Sacramento County Superior Court (Referee: appt. 1998)	California	inactive
Frederick P. Aguirre	Orange County Superior Court (2002–2017)	California	retired
Arthur Alarcón	United States Court of Appeals for the Ninth Circuit (1979–2015)	California	deceased
Gregory Alarcón	Los Angeles Municipal Court (1993–1996); Los Angeles County Superior Court (1996– )	California	active
Samuel Alba	United States District Court for the District of Utah (1992–2012)	Utah	retired
Elsa Alcalá	Texas Court of Criminal Appeals (2011–2018)	Texas	did not seek re-election
Veronica Alicea-Galvan	King County Superior Court (2015– )	Washington	active
Mónica Ramírez Almadani	United States District Court for the Central District of California (2023– )	California	active
Jorge L. Alonso	Circuit Court of Cook County (2003–2014); United States District Court for the Northern District of Illinois (2014– )	Illinois	active
Roy Altman	United States District Court for the Southern District of Florida (2019– )	Florida	active
Cecilia Altonaga	United States District Court for the Southern District of Florida (2003– )	Florida	active
Jose L. Alva	San Joaquin County Superior Court (2006– )	California	active
Ramon Alvarado	Gwinnett County's Recorder's Court (2019–2020)	Georgia	deceased
Brian Álvarez	Fresno County Superior Court (2009– )	California	active
Daniel "Danny" Álvarez	Jefferson County District Court (elected 2018)	Kentucky	deceased
Micaela Álvarez	United States District Court for the Southern District of Texas (2004– )	Texas	active
Olga Álvarez	San Diego County Superior Court (2019– )	California	active
Patricia O’Connell Álvarez	Texas Court of Appeals (2013– )	Texas	active
María Antongiorgi-Jordán	United States District Court for the District of Puerto Rico (2022– )	Puerto Rico	active
John Argüelles	Los Angeles Superior Court (1969–1984); California Court of Appeal (1984–1987); California Supreme Court (1987–1989)	California	retired
Christine Argüello	United States District Court for the District of Colorado (2008– )	Colorado	active
Louis A. Araneta	Maricopa County Superior Court (Commissioner: 1990–1993; Judge: 1993–2009)	Arizona	retired
Silvia R. Arellano	Maricopa County Superior Court (appt. 1990)	Arizona	retired
Maria Arias	Queens County Family Court (2010– )	New York	active
Raúl M. Arias-Marxuach	United States District Court for the District of Puerto Rico (2019– )	Puerto Rico	active
Albert Armendáriz, Sr.	Texas Court of Appeals (1986)	Texas	term ended
María Lucy Armendáriz	Los Angeles County Superior Court (2018– )	California	active
Christina Armijo	United States District Court for the District of New Mexico (2001– )	New Mexico	retired
Sergio Armijo	Pierce County Superior Court (1994–2009)	Washington	deceased
Lorenzo Arredondo	Lake County Circuit Court (1986–2010)	Indiana	retired
Rafael A. Arreola	San Diego Municipal Court (1981–1998); San Diego Superior Court (1998–2007)	California	retired
Maria Arroyo	San Joaquin County Superior Court (2020)	California	retired
Anna María Baca	Maricopa County Superior Court (1994–2009)	Arizona	retired
Paul A. Bacigalupo	Los Angeles County Superior Court (2002–2024)	California	active
Angela Badamo	Criminal Court of the City of New York (2017– )	New York	active
Rita Badhan	Los Angeles County Superior Court (2020– )	California	active
Lourdes Baird	Superior Court of Los Angeles County (1988–1990); United States District Court for the Central District of California (1992–2005)	California	retired
Blanca A. Banuelos	San Joaquin County Superior Court (2020– )	California	active
Manuel Barbosa	U.S. Northern District of Illinois (1998–2012)	Illinois	deceased
Gus C. Barrera, II	San Joaquin County Superior Court (2016– )	California	active
Víctor T. Barrera	Los Angeles Municipal Court (1979–1981); Los Angeles County Superior Court (1981–1999)	California	deceased
Betsy Barros	New York City Civil Court (1996–1997); New York Supreme Court (1998–2014); New York Appellate Division of the Supreme Court, Second Judicial Department (2014– )	New York	active
Rosemary Barkett	Florida Supreme Court (1985–1993); United States Court of Appeals for the Eleventh Circuit (1994–2013)	Florida	sought for different office
Alfonso Martin Bazan	Citrus Municipal Court (1976–1980); Los Angeles County Superior Court (1980–2000)	California	deceased
Carlos Bea	United States Court of Appeals for the Ninth Circuit (2003– )	California	active
Jacqueline Becerra	United States District Court for the Southern District of Florida (2019– )	Florida	active
Consuelo Bedoya-Witt	Circuit Court of Cook County (1988–2008)	Illinois	retired
James Beene	Arizona Superior Court (2009–2017); Arizona Court of Appeals (2017–2019); Arizona Supreme Court (2019– )	Arizona	active
Marissa A. Bejarano	San Diego County Superior Court (2021– )	California	active
Fortunato Benavides	United States Court of Appeals for the Fifth Circuit (1994–2023)	Texas	deceased
Jose R. Benavides	Kern County Superior Court (2010– )	California	active
Roger Benítez	Imperial County Superior Court (1997–2001); Judge of the United States District Court for the Southern District of California (2001– )	California	active
Wilfredo Benítez	Bloomfield Municipal Court (2017– )	New Jersey	active
Jesús Bernal	United States District Court for the Central District of California (2012– )	California	active
Marielsa A. Bernard	Montgomery County Circuit Court (2002– )	Maryland	active
Francisco Besosa	United States District Court for the District of Puerto Rico (2006– )	Puerto Rico	active
Cathy Bissoon	United States District Court for the Western District of Pennsylvania (2008– )	Pennsylvania	active
James Blancarte	Los Angeles County Superior Court (Commissioner: 2006–2018; Judge: 2018– )	California	active
Alicia Yoko Blanco	Los Angeles County Superior Court (Commissioner: 2015–2020: Judge: 2020– )	California	active
Arthur Bocanegra	San Mateo County Superior Court (2002– )	California	active
Suzanne Bolaños	San Francisco County Superior Court (2003– )	California	active
Armando O. Bonilla	United States Court of Federal Claims (2022– )	Washington, D.C.	active
David W. Bonilla	Sacramento County Superior Court (2021– )	California	active
Hugo R. Borja	San Mateo County Superior Court (Commissioner: 2006– )	California	active
Ernest Borunda	San Diego Municipal Court (1979–1998); San Diego Superior Court (1998–2000)	California	retired
Elizabeth L. Bradley	Superior Court of Los Angeles County (2024-)	California	Active
Ana M. Bravo	Sacramento County Superior Court (Commissioner: appt. 2006)	California	inactive
David Briones	United States District Court for the Western District of Texas (1994– )	Texas	active
Francisco P. Briseño	Orange County Superior Court (1979–2014)	California	deceased
Vernon S. Broderick	United States District Court for the Southern District of New York (2013– )	New York	active
Jeffrey Bryan	Minnesota Court of Appeals (2019–2023); United States District Court for the District of Minnesota (2023– )	Minnesota	active
Dean Bucci	Paulding Judicial Circuit (2015– )	Georgia	active
Juan Guerrero Burciaga	United States District Court for the District of New Mexico (1979–1995)	New Mexico	deceased
José A. Cabranes	United States District Court for the District of Connecticut (1979–1994); United States Court of Appeals for the Second Circuit (1994– )	Connecticut	active
Maria M. Cabret	Territorial Court of the Virgin Islands (1987–2006); Supreme Court of the Virgin Islands (2006– )	United States Virgin Islands	active
Consuelo Callahan	Stockton Municipal Court (Commissioner: 1986–1992); San Joaquin County Superior Court (1992–1996); California Court of Appeal for the Third District (1996–2003); United States Court of Appeals for the Ninth Circuit (2003– )	California	active
Santiago E. Campos	United States District Court for the District of New Mexico (1978–2001)	New Mexico	deceased
Barbara Canales	Nueces County Court (2019– )	Texas	active
Francisco Cancino	Administrative Law Judge [U.S. Department of Health and Human Services (HHS) Office for Civil Rights (OCR)]	California	active
Hiram Rafael Cancio	United States District Court for the District of Puerto Rico (1967–1974)	Puerto Rico	deceased
Aileen Cannon	United States District Court for the Southern District of Florida (2020– )	Florida	active
Raoul G. Cantero III	Florida Supreme Court (2002–2008)	Florida	retired
Kathleen Cardone	United States District Court for the Western District of Texas (2003– )	Texas	active
Jane Cardoza	Fresno County Superior Court (1996–2021 )	California	retired
Silvia Carreño-Coll	United States District Court for the District of Puerto Rico (2011– )	Puerto Rico	active
Audrey Carrión	Eighth Circuit Court for Baltimore City (1999– )	Maryland	active
John Carro	New York State Supreme Court, Appellate Division, (1979–1994)	New York	retired
Salvador E. Casellas	United States District Court for the District of Puerto Rico (1994–2017)	Puerto Rico	deceased
Esther Castellanos	Sacramento County Superior Court (Commissioner: 1985–2007)	California	retired
Jose S. Castillo	San Diego County Superior Court (2020– )	California	active
Michele M. Castillo	Ventura County Superior Court (2018– )	California	active
Ruben Castillo	United States District Court for the Northern District of Illinois (1994–2019)	Illinois	retired
Arturo Castro	Alameda County Superior Court (2015– )	California	active
Federico Castro	Orange County Superior Court (1994–2014)	California	retired
Leonardo Castro	Second Judicial District in Ramsey County, Minnesota (2012– )	Minnesota	active
Raúl Héctor Castro	Pima County Superior Court (1958–1964)	Arizona	deceased
Roy Cazares	San Diego Municipal Court (appt. 1982); San Diego Superior Court (ret. 2000)	California	retired
David Cerda	Illinois Court of Appeals (1989– 2022)	Illinois	retired
Carmen Consuelo Cerezo	United States District Court for the District of Puerto Rico (1980–2021)	Puerto Rico	retired
Alicia R. Chacón	El Paso County Court (1990–1994)	Texas	lost reelection
Luz Elena D. Chapa	Texas Court of Appeals (2013– )	Texas	active
Anita Lewis Chávez	City of Phoenix Court (Judge Pro Tem)	Arizona	deceased
Edward L. Chávez	New Mexico Supreme Court (2003–2018)	New Mexico	retired
Harriet Chávez	Phoenix Municipal Court (1989–1991); Maricopa County Superior Court (Commissioner: 1991–2003; Judge: 2003–2014)	Arizona	retired
Víctor E. Chávez	Los Angeles County Superior Court (1990–2020; Presiding Judge: 1999–2000)	California	deceased
Victoria M. Chávez	Los Angeles County Superior Court (1992–2005); California 2nd District Court of Appeal (2005– )	California	active
Carmen Beauchamp Ciparick	New York City Criminal Court (1978–1983); New York Supreme Court (1982–1994); New York Court of Appeals (1994–2012)	New York	retired
Theresa M. Cisneros	Colorado Fourth Judicial District (1997–2019)	Colorado	retired
Brenda Claudio	21st Judicial Circuit in Illinois (2021– )	Illinois	active
Angela Colmenero	United States District Court for the Southern District of Texas (2026– )	Texas	active
Dori Contreras	Texas Court of Appeals (2003– )	Texas	active
Joe W. Contreras	Arizona Court of Appeals (1979–1996)	Arizona	deceased
Matias R. Contreras	Imperial County Superior Court	California	retired
Rudolph Contreras	United States District Court for the District of Columbia (2012– ); United States Foreign Intelligence Surveillance Court (2016– )	Washington, D.C.	active
Carlos Cordova	Perrysburg Courts	Ohio	deceased
Ricardo Cordova	Stanislaus County Superior Court (2003– )	California	active
Valdemar Aguirre Cordova	United States District Court for the District of Arizona (1978–1988)	Arizona	deceased
Natalia "Nata" Cornelio	Harris County District Court (2021– )	Texas	active
Adolfo Corona	Fresno County Superior Court (2003– )	California	active
María Luz Corona	Lake County Domestic Relations Court	Indiana	active
Jaime R. Corral	Los Angeles County Superior Court (1979–1999)	California	retired
Geary D. Cortés	San Diego Municipal Court (1993–1994); San Diego Superior Court (1994–2003)	California	retired
Sonia Cortés	Yolo County Superior Court (2015– )	California	active
Annabelle G. Cortez	Los Angeles County Superior Court (2012– )	California	active
Angel A. Cortiñas	Florida Third District Court of Appeal (2005–2013)	Florida	retired
Gregg Costa	United States District Court for the Southern District of Texas (2012–2014); United States Court of Appeals for the Fifth Circuit (2014–2022)	Texas	resigned
Francisca Cota	Phoenix Municipal Court (1994– )	Arizona	active
Raymond Cota	Imperial County Superior Court (ret. 2016)	California	retired
John D. Couriel	Supreme Court of Florida (2020– )	Florida	active
Manuel Covarrubias	Ventura County Superior Court (2002–2023)	California	active
Virginia M. Hernández Covington	United States District Court for the Middle District of Florida (2004– )	Florida	active
Randy Crane	United States District Court for the Southern District of Texas (2002– )	Texas	active
Maria Elena Cruz	Arizona Court of Appeals (2017–2025); Arizona Supreme Court (2025– )	Arizona	active
Rene Cruz	Illinois 16th Circuit Court (2012– )	Illinois	active
Mariano-Florentino Cuéllar	Supreme Court of California (2015–2021)	California	resigned
Gonzalo P. Curiel	United States District Court for the Southern District of California (2012– )	California	active
Yolanda L. Curtin	Harford County Circuit Court (2013– )	Illinois	active
Uley Norris Damiani	Alexandria Juvenile and Domestic Relations Court (2009– )	Virginia	active
María Davalos	Los Angeles County Superior Court (2016- )	California	active
Edward Dávila	Santa Clara County Superior Court (2001–2011); United States District Court for the Northern District of California (2011– )	California	active
Ana de Alba	Fresno County Superior Court (2018–2022); United States District Court for the Eastern District of California (2022–2023); United States Court of Appeals for the Ninth Circuit (2023– )	California	active
David Francisco de Alba	Sacramento County Superior Court (2001– )	California	active
James DeAnda	United States District Court for the Southern District of Texas (1979–1992)	Texas	deceased
Michelle DeCasas	Los Angeles County Superior Court (2020- )	California	active
Thomas A. Delaney	Orange County Superior Court (2014– )	California	active
J. Antonio DelCampo	DeKalb County State Court (2002–2011)	Georgia	resigned
Armando de León	Maricopa County Superior Court (1983–1999)	Arizona	retired
Jessica Delgado	Santa Clara County Superior Court (2021– )	California	active
Jo Ann Delgado	Justice of the Peace, Precinct 2, Place 1 of Harris County, Texas (2001– )	Texas	active
Pedro Delgado Hernández	United States District Court for the District of Puerto Rico (2014– )	Puerto Rico	active
Aida Delgado-Colón	United States District Court for the District of Puerto Rico (2006– )	Puerto Rico	active
Justine del Muro	16th Judicial Circuit (1993– )	Missouri	active
Víctor del Pino	Montgomery County District Court (2019– )	Maryland	active
Marisa Demeo	Superior Court of the District of Columbia (2007– )	Washington, D.C.	active
Paul de Muñiz	Oregon Court of Appeals (1990–2000); Oregon Supreme Court (2001–2013)	Oregon	retired
Thomas DeSantos	Kings County Superior Court (2003–2018); California Fifth District Court of Appeal (2018– )	California	active
Albert Díaz	North Carolina Superior Court (2001–2005); North Carolina Business Court (2005–2009); United States Court of Appeals for the Fourth Circuit (2010– )	North Carolina	active
Enriqueta Díaz	Maverick County Court	Texas	retired
J. Michael Díaz	King County Superior Court (2018–2022); Washington Court of Appeals (2022– )	Washington	active
Joe Díaz	Georgia Northeastern Judicial Circuit (2015– )	Georgia	active
Marta S. Díaz	San Mateo County Superior Court (1997–2019)	California	retired
Mónica Díaz	Fresno County Superior Court (2017– )	California	active
Nelson Díaz	Court of Common Pleas, First Judicial District of Pennsylvania (1981–1993)	Pennsylvania	retired
Samuel Díaz Jr.	Riverside County Superior Court (2009– )	California	active
Daniel R. Domínguez	United States District Court for the District of Puerto Rico (1994–2024)	Puerto Rico	retired
Denise Domínguez	Civil Court of the City of New York (2013– )	New York	active
E. Carlos Domínguez	Los Angeles County Superior Court (2021– )	California	active
Louis F. Domínguez	Phoenix Municipal Court (appt. 1994); Surprise Municipal Court (2013– )	Arizona	active
Leopoldo E. Dorado	San Leandro-Hayward Municipal Court (1988–1998); Alameda County Superior Court (1998–2022)	California	active
David W. Dugan	United States District Court for the Southern District of Illinois (2020– )	Illinois	active
Angela M. Eaves	District Court of Maryland, District 9, Harford County (2000–2007); Harford County Circuit Court, 3rd Judicial Circuit (2007–2022); Supreme Court of Maryland (2022– )	Maryland	active
Laura A. Echartea	Michigan 36th District Court (2011– )	Michigan	active
Elma Salinas Ender	341st Judicial District of Texas (1983–2012)	Texas	retired
Ana L. Escobar	General Sessions Court (Davidson County) (2018– )	Tennessee	active
Veronica Escobar	El Paso County Court (Commissioner: 2006–2010; Judge: 2010–2017)	Texas	resigned
Carmen E. Espinosa	New Britain District Superior Court (1992–2011); Connecticut Appellate Court (2011–2013); Connecticut Supreme Court (2013–2017)	Connecticut	retired
Peter P. Espinoza	Los Angeles Municipal Court (1994–1997); Los Angeles County Superior Court (1997–2016)	California	retired
Margarita Esquiroz	Florida 11th Judicial Circuit Court (1979–2010)	Florida	deceased
Teresa Estrada-Mullaney	San Luis Obispo Superior Court (1991–2011)	California	retired
David Estudillo	Grant County Superior Court (2015–2021); United States District Court for the Western District of Washington (2021– )	Washington	active
Alfonso Fernández	Santa Clara County Superior Court (1998–2012)	California	retired
Ferdinand Fernández	United States District Court for the Central District of California (1985–1989); United States Court of Appeals for the Ninth Circuit (1989– )	California	active
Kenneth J. Fernández	Riverside County Superior Court (2018– )	California	active
Lloyd Fernández	Arizona Court of Appeals (appt. 1985-1996)	Arizona	deceased
Manuel "Manny" Adam Fernández	Thirty-Fourth Judicial District Court (2001–2013)	Louisiana	deceased
Juan B. Fernández-Badillo	United States District Court for the District of Puerto Rico (1967–1989)	Puerto Rico	deceased
Faustino J. Fernández-Vina	New Jersey Supreme Court (2013–2022)	New Jersey	retired
Nicholas Figueroa	Supreme Court of The State of New York	New York	retired
Raul Figueroa	Buffalo City Court (ret. 2001)	New York	retired
Francisco F. Firmat	Orange County Superior Court (1985–2013)	California	retired
Daniel A. Flores	San Francisco County Superior Court (2014– )	California	active
Joseph Flores	Lucas County Juvenile Court (1981–2003)	Ohio	retired
Rogelio R. Flores	Santa Barbara Municipal Court (Commissioner: 1987–1997; Judge: 1997–1998); Santa Barbara County Superior Court (1998–2018)	California	retired
Eduardo Fontanez Jr.	East Chicago City Court (2003– )	Indiana	active
Jose Franco	Santa Clara County Superior Court (2015– )	California	active
Gabriel A. Fuentes	U.S. District Court for the Northern District of Illinois (2019– )	Illinois	active
Julio M. Fuentes	United States Court of Appeals for the Third Circuit (2000– )	New Jersey	active
José A. Fusté	United States District Court for the District of Puerto Rico (1985–2016)	Puerto Rico	retired
Veronica Galván	King County Superior Court (2014– )	Washington	active
Albert J. García	Los Angeles County Superior Court (Commissioner: 1993–2008)	California	retired
Alfredo García	San Benito Municipal Court	Texas	deceased
Arthur A. García	Santa Barbara County Superior Court (Commissioner: 1996–2003; Judge: 2003– )	California	active
Brad García	United States Court of Appeals for the District of Columbia Circuit (2023– )	Washington, D.C.	active
Carmen M. García	Trenton Municipal Court (1998–2004)	New Jersey	resigned
David García	Will County Court (2013– )	Illinois	active
Denisse García	Texas Court of Appeals (2020– )	Texas	active
Edward J. García	Sacramento Municipal Court (1972–1984); United States District Court for the Eastern District of California (1984–2023)	California	deceased
Hipólito Frank García	Bexar County Law Court (1964–1974); 144th Judicial District Court of Bexar County (1975–1980); United States District Court for the Western District of Texas (1980–2002)	Texas	deceased
Luis García	San Francisco Municipal Court (ended in 1982)	California	died in office
Lupe C. García	Alameda County Superior Court (2016– )	California	active
Marc A. García	Merced County Superior Court (2007–2015)	California	resigned
Mario García	Southern District of Indiana (2020– )	Indiana	active
Matthew L. García	United States District Court for the District of New Mexico (2023– )	New Mexico	active
Michael J. García	New York Court of Appeals (2016– )	New York	active
Michael T. García	Sacramento County Superior Court (1989–2009)	California	retired
Orlando Luis García	United States District Court for the Western District of Texas (1994– )	Texas	active
Patricia García	San Diego County Superior Court (2003–2024)	California	active
Peter J. García	22nd Judicial District Court (1996–2020)	Louisiana	deceased
Richard "Rick" García	Alaska Fourth Judicial District (2019– )	Alaska	active
Sylvia García	Harris County Commissioners Court (2003–2010)	Texas	lost reelection
Jay A. García-Gregory	United States District Court for the District of Puerto Rico (2000– )	Puerto Rico	active
Candice García-Rodrigo	San Bernardino County Superior Court (2021– )	California	active
Donna G. Garza	San Bernardino County Superior Court (appt. 1998-2021)	California	retired
Emilio M. Garza	United States District Court for the Western District of Texas (1988–1991); United States Court of Appeals for the Fifth Circuit (1991–2015)	Texas	retired
John C. Gastelum	Orange County Superior Court (2003– )	California	active
Gustavo Gelpí	United States District Court for the District of Puerto Rico (2006–2021); United States Court of Appeals for the First Circuit (2021– )	Puerto Rico	active
Gilberto Gierbolini-Ortiz	United States District Court for the District of Puerto Rico (1980–2004)	Puerto Rico	deceased
Loretta M. Giorgi	San Francisco County Superior Court (2006– )	California	active
Mario A. Goderich	Industrial Claims Court (appt. 1975); Florida Eleventh Judicial Circuit Court (appt. 1978); Florida Third Judicial Circuit Court (appt. 1990)	Florida	retired
Michael Gómez	Harris County District Court (2009– )	Texas	active
Douglas "Doug" Gonzáles	19th Judicial District Court (1976–1990); 1st Circuit Court of Appeal (1990–2002)	Louisiana	deceased
Gregory M. Gonzáles	Clark County Superior Court (2012– )	Washington	active
Kenneth J. Gonzáles	United States District Court for the District of New Mexico (2013– )	New Mexico	active
Alejandro R. González	83rd Judicial District of the State of Texas (1984–1999); Appointed by Governor Mark White February 1, 1984; Resigned April 30, 1999 (Health)	Texas	deceased
Ernesto González	United States District Court for the Western District of Texas (2024– )	Texas	active
Héctor González	United States District Court for the Eastern District of New York (2022– )	New York	active
Luis A. González	New York Appellate Division of the Supreme Court, First Judicial Department (2002–2018)	New York	retired
Irma Elsa González	United States District Court for the Southern District of California (1984–2013)	California	retired
José Alejandro González Jr.	Florida Seventeenth Judicial Circuit Court (1964–1978); United States District Court for the Southern District of Florida (1978– )	Florida	active
Luis A. González	New York City Civil Court (1985–1992); New York Supreme Court, 12th Judicial District (1992–2002); First Judicial Department (2002– )	New York	active
Raul A. González Jr.	Texas Supreme Court (1984–1998)	Texas	retired
Rene G. González	Anchorage Superior Court (1984–2002)	Alaska	retired
Roberto González	Providence Housing Court (2004– )	Rhode Island	active
Steven González	Supreme Court of Washington (2012– )	Washington	active
Charles Grabau	Massachusetts Superior Court (appt. 1985)	Massachusetts	retired
Donald Grajales	New York State Court of Claims	New York	deceased
Jennifer Johnson Grant	Lake Forest Park Municipal Court (2022–)	Washington	active
Evelio M. Grillo	Alameda County Superior Court (2003– )	California	active
Steven D. Grimberg	United States District Court for the Northern District of Georgia (2019– )	Georgia	active
David C. Guaderrama	United States District Court for the Western District of Texas (2010– )	Texas	active
Amparo Monique Guerra	Texas First Court of Appeals (2020– )	Texas	active
Amy K. Guerra	Fresno County Superior Court (2018– )	California	active
Reynaldo Guerra Garza	United States District Court for the Southern District of Texas (1961–1979); United States Court of Appeals for the Fifth Circuit (1979–2004)	Texas	deceased
Teresa Guerrero-Daley	Santa Clara County Superior Court (appt. 2004)	California	deceased
Alfonso J. “Jess” González	Lucas County Common Pleas Court (2019– )	Ohio	active
Louis Guirola Jr.	United States District Court for the Southern District of Mississippi (2004– ); United States Foreign Intelligence Surveillance Court (2019– )	Mississippi; Washington, D.C.	active
Annie M. Gutiérrez	Imperial County Superior Court (appt. 2002)	California	term ended
Arturo F. Gutiérrez	Ventura County Superior Court (2002– )	California	active
Carlos R. Gutiérrez	Solano County Superior Court (2016– )	California	active
Frank Gutiérrez	Precinct 3 Justice of the Peace (2023– )	Texas	active
Gilbert Gutiérrez	Weld County District Court (1997–2010)	Colorado	retired
Héctor E. Gutiérrez	Los Angeles County Superior Court (2014– )	California	active
Nancy Gutiérrez	Hardeeville Municipal Court	South Carolina	active
Philip S. Gutiérrez	Los Angeles County Superior Court (1997–2007); United States District Court for the Central District of California (2007–2024)	California	retired
Sergio Gutiérrez	Idaho Court of Appeals (1993–2018)	Idaho	retired
Eva Guzmán	Supreme Court of Texas (2009–2021)	Texas	resigned
Joseph Guzmán	Maricopa Justice Courts (1991– )	Arizona	active
Margaret R. Guzmán	Massachusetts Trial Court (2009–2017); Ayer District Court (2017–2023); United States District Court for the District of Massachusetts (2023– )	Massachusetts	active
Ronald A. Guzmán	United States District Court for the Northern District of Illinois (1990– )	Illinois	active
Nanette Hasette	Nueces County District Court (1997–2024)	Texas	active
Cecily C. Hazelrigg	Washington State Court of Appeals (2019– )	Washington	active
Lisa S. Headley	New York City Civil Court, New York County (2015– )	New York	active
Álex R. Hernández Sr.	Calhoun County (1998-) Calhoun County Court at Law County Judge (1985-1989)	Texas	active
Aurora Chaides Hernández	Precinct 3 Justice of the Peace (elec. 1994–2022)	Texas	lost reelection
George C. Hernández Jr.	Alameda County Municipal Court (1989–1996); Alameda County Superior Court (1996–2018)	California	retired
Helios Joe Hernández	Superior Court of Riverside County (2001–2018)	California	retired
Marco A. Hernández	United States District Court for the District of Oregon (2011– )	Oregon	active
Todd Hernández	19th Judicial District Court (2001–2018)	Louisiana	retired
Federico Hernández Denton	Supreme Court of Puerto Rico (1985–2014)	Puerto Rico	retired
Deborah Hernández-Mitchell	18th Judicial District Court (2015– )	Kansas	active
Benjamín P. Hernández-Stern	Los Angeles County Superior Court (2021– )	California	active
Judith C. Herrera	United States District Court for the District of New Mexico (2004– )	New Mexico	active
Lina Hidalgo	Harris County Court (2018– )	Texas	active
Leticia Hinojosa	Texas Court of Appeals (2016– )	Texas	active
Ricardo Hinojosa	United States District Court for the Southern District of Texas (1983– )	Texas	active
Marcia Morales Howard	United States District Court for the Middle District of Florida (2003– )	Florida	active
Robert S. Huie	United States District Court for the Southern District of California (2022– )	California	active
Richard A. Ibáñez	Los Angeles County Superior Court (appt. 1995)	California	deceased
Dora Irizarry	New York City Criminal Court (1995–1997); Court of Claims in Kings County (1997–1998); Court of Claims in Manhattan (1998–2002); United States District Court for the Eastern District of New York (2004– )	New York	active
Lillian Vega Jacobs	Los Angeles County Superior Court (2014– )	California	active
Agustín R. Jiménez	Sacramento County Superior Court (2021– )	California	active
Pedro Jiménez	Vicinage 7 Superior Court (2008–2016)	New Jersey	resigned
Michael W. Jones	Placer County Superior Court (2012– )	California	active
Adalberto Jordán	United States District Court for the Southern District of Florida (1999–2012); United States Court of Appeals for the Eleventh Circuit (2012– )	Florida	active
Norma Guzmán Kauzlarich	Fourteenth Judicial Circuit Court (2014– )	Illinois	active
Ellie Kerstetter	Jefferson County Family Court (2020– )	Kentucky	active
Robbie Partida-Kipness	Texas Court of Appeals (2018– )	Texas	active
Erick Kolthoff	Supreme Court of Puerto Rico (2009– )	Puerto Rico	active
Maria Korvick	Florida Eleventh Judicial Circuit Court (1981–2019)	Florida	retired
Vanessa Kosky	City of Doraville Municipal Court (2020– )	Georgia	active
Jorge Labarga	Florida Supreme Court (2009–2018)	Florida	retired
Carlos Flores Laboy	Prince William County Juvenile and Domestic Relations District Court (2020– )	Virginia	active
Danilo "Danny" Lacayo	Harris County District Court (2019– )	Texas	active
Hector Manuel Laffitte	United States District Court for the District of Puerto Rico (1983–2007)	Puerto Rico	retired
Barbara Lagoa	Florida Third District Court of Appeal (2006–2019); Supreme Court of Florida (2019); United States Court of Appeals for the Eleventh Circuit (2019– )	Florida	active
George La Plata	United States District Court for the Eastern District of Michigan (2013–2017)	Michigan	deceased
Luis A. Lavin	Los Angeles Superior Court; California Court of Appeal, Second Appellate District (2015– )	California	active
Robert W. Lee	Broward County Circuit Court (1997– )	Florida	active
Mónica Lepe-Negrete	Imperial County Superior Court (2019– )	California	active
José L. Linares	Essex County Superior Court (2000–2002); United States District Court for the District of New Jersey (2002–2019)	New Jersey	retired
Nora Longoria	Texas Court of Appeals (2012– )	Texas	active
Roberto Longoria	Los Angeles County Superior Court (2011– )	California	active
Daniel S. López	Los Angeles Municipal Court (1989–1994); Los Angeles County Superior Court (1994–2014)	California	retired
Daniel T. López	Arlington General District Court (2019– )	Virginia	active
Dax López	Dekalb County State Court (2010–2021)	Georgia	retired
Gloria E. López	Harris County District Court (2019– )	Texas	active
John López IV	Arizona Supreme Court (2016– )	Arizona	active
Linda López	United States District Court for the Southern District of California (2018– )	California	active
María López	Massachusetts Superior Court (1993–2003)	Massachusetts	resigned
Rogelio "Roger" López, Jr.	Precinct 4 (Bexar County) (2009–2023)	Texas	lost reelection
Sandra López	Salem County Superior Court (2015– )	New Jersey	active
Cassandra López-Shaw	Snohomish County Superior Court (2020–2022)	Washington	deceased
Margarita López-Torres	Kings County Surrogate's Court (2006– )	New York	active
Hugo J. Loza	Tulare County Superior Court (Commissioner: 1995–2015; Judge: 2015– )	California	active
Rodolfo Lozano	United States District Court for the Northern District of Indiana (1998–2018)	Indiana	active
Carlos F. Lucero	United States Court of Appeals for the Tenth Circuit (1993– )	Colorado	active
Katherine L. Lucero	Santa Clara County Superior Court (2001– )	California	active
Sharon A. Lueras	Sacramento County Superior Court (2007– )	California	active
Carolina Lugo	Los Angeles County Superior Court (2018– )	California	active
Eugene D. Luján	Supreme Court of New Mexico (1945–1959)	New Mexico	deceased
Elizabeth Macías	Orange County Superior Court (2012– )	California	active
Richard A. Macías	18th Judicial District Court (2017– )	Kansas	active
Patricia A. Madrid	New Mexico District Court (appt. 1978-1998?) Attorney General of New Mexico (1999-2006)	New Mexico	sought for different office
Petra Jiménez Maes	New Mexico Supreme Court (1998–2018)	New Mexico	retired
Nelida Malave-Gonzáles	Bronx County Surrogate's Court (2012– )	New York	active
Albert Maldonado	Monterey County Superior Court (1995–2017)	California	retired
Nancy L. Maldonado	United States District Court for the Northern District of Illinois (2022–2024); United States Court of Appeals for the Seventh Circuit (2024– )	Illinois	active
Sallie Manzanet-Daniels	New York City Civil Court (1999–2001); New York Supreme Court (2001–2009); New York Appellate Division of the Supreme Court, First Judicial Department (2009– )	New York	active
Marina García Marmolejo	United States District Court for the Southern District of Texas (2011– )	Texas	active
Alfredo Chávez Márquez	United States District Court for the District of Arizona (1980–2014)	Arizona	deceased
Jose D.L. Márquez	Colorado Court of Appeals (1988–2008)	Colorado	retired
Leonard E. Márquez	Contra Costa County Superior Court (2018– )	California	active
Miguel Márquez	California Court of Appeal, Sixth Appellate District (2012– )	California	active
Mónica Márquez	Colorado Supreme Court (2010– )	Colorado	active
Rosemary Márquez	United States District Court for the District of Arizona (2014– )	Arizona	active
Raquel Márquez-Britsch	Riverside County Superior Court (2012– )	California	active
Víctor Marrero	United States District Court for the Southern District of New York (2010– )	New York	active
Araceli Martínez-Olguín	United States District Court for the Northern District of California (2023– )	California	active
Álex J. Martínez	Supreme Court of Colorado (1996–2011)	Colorado	resigned
Ana Martínez	Harris County District Court (2021– )	Texas	active
Ana María Martínez	DeKalb State Court (2022– )	Georgia	active
Ángela M. Martínez	United States District Court for the District of Arizona (2023– )	Arizona	active
Cira Martínez	Bronx Family Court (c. 1992-1999)	New York	deceased
José E. Martínez	United States District Court for the Southern District of Florida (2002– )	Florida	active
Michael Martínez	Michigan 50th District Court (2003–2022)	Michigan	retiref
Philip Ray Martínez	United States District Court for the Western District of Texas (2002–2021)	Texas	deceased
Rebeca Martínez	Texas Court of Appeals (2013– )	Texas	active
Ricardo S. Martínez	King County Superior Court (1990–1998); United States District Court for the Western District of Washington (1998– )	Washington	active
Robert Anthony "Tony" Martínez	29th Judicial District Court (2019– )	Kansas	active
Robert M. Martínez	Los Angeles County Superior Court (1985–2018)	California	retired
Stefanie Martínez	Nebraska 2nd Judicial District County Court (2013– )	Nebraska	active
William J. Martínez	United States District Court for the District of Colorado (2010– )	Colorado	active
Rafael Martínez Torres	Supreme Court of Puerto Rico (2009– )	Puerto Rico	active
Debra Ibarra Mayfield	Harris County Civil Court-at-Law No. 1 (2011–2015) 165th District Court (2015–2017) 190th District Court (2017-2018) lost reelection	Texas	deceased
David M. Medina	Supreme Court of Texas (2004–2012)	Texas	term ended
Harold Medina	United States District Court for the Southern District of New York (1947–1951); United States Court of Appeals for the Second Circuit (1951–1980)	New York	deceased
Sam Medina	Texas 237th State District Court (res. 2009)	Texas	resigned
Vivian L. Medinilla	Superior Court of Delaware (2013– )	Delaware	active
Rita Mella	New York County Surrogate's Court (2012– )	New York	active
John Méndez	Sacramento County Superior Court (2001–2008); United States District Court for the Eastern District of California (2008– )	California	active
Gina R. Méndez-Miró	Puerto Rico Court of Appeals (2016–2023); United States District Court for the District of Puerto Rico (2023– )	Puerto Rico	active
Manuel J. Méndez	New York State Supreme Court, New York County (2013– )	New York	active
Carlos E. Mendoza	United States District Court for the Southern District of Florida (2014– )	Florida	active
John F. Mendoza	Nevada Eighth Judicial District Court (1966–1990)	Nevada	deceased
Patricia Mendoza	Cook Judicial Circuit Court (2007– )	Illinois	active
Salvador Mendoza Jr.	Municipal and Juvenile Courts in Benton County and Franklin County (Judge Pro Tem: 1999–2013); Superior Court for Benton and Franklin Counties (2013–2014); United States District Court for the Eastern District of Washington (2014–2022); United States Court of Appeals for the Ninth Circuit (2022– )	Washington	active
Juan Merchán	Family Court of the City of New York, Bronx County (2006–2009); Supreme Court of New York, New York County (2009– ); New York Court of Claims (2009–2018)	New York	active
Alberto Miera	Ramsey Court Court (appt. 1983)	Minnesota	suspended
Myrna Milán	Newark Municipal Court (1988-1992)	New Jersey	resigned
Marilyn Milian	Florida Circuit Court (appt. 1999)	Florida	retired
Raymond Mireles	Los Angeles County Superior Court (1987–2003)	California	retired
Teresa Molina	Cook Judicial Circuit Court (2019– )	Illinois	active
Enrique Monguia	Los Angeles County Superior Court (2014– )	California	active
Adán Montalbán	Los Angeles County Superior Court (2020– )	California	active
Frank Montalvo	United States District Court for the Western District of Texas (2003– )	Texas	active
Ruth Bermúdez Montenegro	Imperial County Superior Court (2015–2018); United States District Court for the Southern District of California (2018– )	California	active
Franklin S. Montero	Bergenfield Municipal Court (2020– )	New Jersey	active
Richard Montes	Los Angeles County Superior Court (appt. 1976)	California	retired
Anna Montoya-Páez	Santa Cruz County Superior Court	Arizona	active
Maricela Moore	162nd Judicial District Court of Dallas County (2017–2022) Fifth District Court of Appeals Place 4 (2023– )	Texas	active
David S. Morales	United States District Court for the Southern District of Texas (2019– )	Texas	active
Nilda Morales-Horowitz	New York State Supreme Court, Westchester County (2001– )	New York	active
Emily Morales-Minerva	New York City Civil Court, New York County (2017– )	New York	active
Armando Moreno	Los Angeles County Superior Court (Commissioner: appt. 1992)	California	retired
Carlos R. Moreno	United States District Court for the Central District of California (1998–2001); Supreme Court of California (2001–2011)	California	retired
Daniel C. Moreno	Hennepin County District Court (2006– )	Minnesota	active
Federico A. Moreno	United States District Court for the Southern District of Florida (1990– )	Florida	active
Alia Moses	United States District Court for the Western District of Texas (2002– )	Texas	active
Barbara Rodríguez Mundell	Maricopa County Superior Court (2001–2010)	Arizona	retired
Carlos G. Muñiz	Supreme Court of Florida (2019– )	Florida	active
Frances Muñoz	Orange County Harbor Judicial District (appt. 1978)	California	retired
Gregory Muñoz	Orange County Superior Court (1999–2014)	California	retired
Carlos Murguia	United States District Court for the District of Kansas (1999–2020)	Kansas	resigned
Mary H. Murguia	United States District Court for the District of Arizona (2000–2011); United States Court of Appeals for the Ninth Circuit (2011– )	Arizona	active
Serena Murillo	Los Angeles County Superior Court (2015–2024); United States District Court for the Central District of California (2024– )	California	active
Tiana J. Murillo	Los Angeles County Superior Court (2022– )	California	active
Richard E. Naranjo	Los Angeles County Superior Court (2002–2023)	California	retired
Gloria Navarro	United States District Court for the District of Nevada (2010– )	Nevada	active
Rene Navarro	Santa Clara County Municipal Court (1986–1994); Santa Clara County Superior Court (1994–2014)	California	retired
Miriam Naveira	Supreme Court of Puerto Rico (1985–2004)	Puerto Rico	retired
Clemente Ruiz Nazario	United States District Court for the District of Puerto Rico (1952–1966)	Puerto Rico	deceased
Lenore Carrero Nesbitt	United States District Court for the Southern District of Florida (1983–2001)	Florida	deceased
Pam Nogueira	Thurston County Superior Court (Commissioner 2023; Judge 2023– )	Washington	active
Emilio Núñez	New York City Magistrate (1951–1952); Court of Special Sessions (1952–1956); New York City Court (1956–1962); Supreme Court, First Appellate Department (1962–1977)	New York	deceased
Gustalo Núñez	Lorain Municipal Court	Ohio	retired
Ralph Núñez	Fresno County Superior Court (1983–2005)	California	retired
Tarlika Núñez-Navarro	Ninth Judicial Circuit Court of Florida (2018– )	Florida	active
Ramón Ocasio III	Circuit Court of Cook County (2007– )	Illinois	active
Frank Ochoa	Santa Barbara County Municipal Court (1983–1997) Santa Barbara County Superior Court (1997–2015)	California	retired
Gloria Ochoa-Bruck	Spokane Municipal Court (2021– )	Washington	active
Luis "Lou" Olivera	North Carolina Twelfth Judicial District (2012– )	North Carolina	active
Fernando M. Olguín	United States District Court for the Central District of California (2013– )	California	active
Jose Rolando Olvera Jr.	United States District Court for the Southern District of Texas (2015– )	Texas	active
Gary R. Orozco	Fresno County Superior Court (2001– )	California	active
Patricia Orozco	Arizona Court of Appeals (2004–2016)	Arizona	retired
Richard Orozco	Orange County Municipal Court	California	retired
Yolanda Orozco	Los Angeles County Superior Court (2010– )	California	active
Darleen Ortega	Oregon Court of Appeals (2003– )	Oregon	active
S. James Otero	Los Angeles County Superior Court (1990–2003); United States District Court for the Central District of California (2003–2020)	California	retired
Ella Ortiz	Napa County Superior Court (2013– )	California	active
Jorge Ortiz	Illinois Nineteenth Judicial Circuit (2016– )	Illinois	active
Joseph T. Ortiz	San Bernardino County Superior Court (2020– )	California	active
Susana Ortiz	Cook Judicial Circuit Court (2016– )	Illinois	active
Carmen Otero	King County Superior Court (1980–1995)	Washington	retired
Rafael A. Ovalles	Rhode Island District Court (2005–2017)	Rhode Island	resigned
Maria L. Oxholm	36th District Court (Wayne County) (1999-2016); U.S. Bankruptcy Court for the Eastern District of Michigan (2016– )	Michigan	active
Mildred Pabón	Supreme Court of Puerto Rico (2009– )	Puerto Rico	active
Richard A. Pacheco	Orange County Superior Court (Commissioner: 2001–2016; Judge: 2016– )	California	active
Evelyn Padin	United States District Court for the District of New Jersey (2022– )	New Jersey	active
Richard Páez	United States District Court for the Central District of California (1994–2000); United States Court of Appeals for the Ninth Circuit (2000– )	California	active
Frances M. Palacios	Utah Third Judicial District Court (Commissioner: appt. 1992)	Utah	active
Patrick K. Palacios	San Benito County Superior Court (2022– )	California	active
Sandra T. Parga	Illinois 16th Circuit Court (2017– )	Illinois	active
Robbie Partida-Kipness	Texas Court of Appeals (2018– )	Texas	active
Steve Pazzo	Rogers County District Court (2010– )	Oklahoma	active
Rosendo Peña	Fresno County Superior Court (2002–2012); California Fifth District Court of Appeal (2012– )	California	active
André M. Peñalver	Pierce County Superior Court (2021– )	Washington	active
Bianka Pérez	New York City Civil Court, Bronx County (2017–2020) New York Supreme Court (2021–)	New York	active
David D. Pérez Jr.	Los Angeles County Superior Court (appt. 1985)	California	retired
Jaime "James" O. Pérez	Orange County Municipal Court (1966–1975); Orange County Superior Court (1975–1987)	California	deceased
Joe T. Pérez	Orange County Superior Court (Commissioner: 2007–2010; Judge: 2010– )	California	active
Mia Roberts Pérez	Philadelphia County Court of Common Pleas (2016–2022); United States District Court for the Eastern District of Pennsylvania (2022– )	Pennsylvania	active
Mario Pérez	North Carolina 3A Judicial District (2018– )	North Carolina	active
Michael “Mike” E. Pérez	Superior Court of Orange County (2018– )	California	active
Myrna Pérez	United States Court of Appeals for the Second Circuit (2021– )	New York	active
Juan Pérez-Giménez	United States District Court for the District of Puerto Rico (1979–2020)	Puerto Rico	deceased
Hernan Gregorio Pesquera	United States District Court for the District of Puerto Rico (1972–1982)	Puerto Rico	deceased
Rachel L. Pickering	Kansas Court of Appeals (2022– )	Kansas	active
Jaime Pieras Jr.	United States District Court for the District of Puerto Rico (1982–2011)	Puerto Rico	deceased
Diccia T. Pineda-Kirwan	New York City Civil Court (2003-2009), New York Supreme Court 11th Judicial District (2010–2018), Supreme Court 10th Judicial District (2019–)	New York	active
Edmund Ponce de León	Circuit Court of Cook County (1996–2016)	Illinois	retired
Joseph Porras	Los Angeles County Superior Court (2012– )	California	active
Richard W. Postma, Jr.	Alaska District Courts (2007–2010)	Alaska	lost reelection
Edward C. Prado	United States District Court for the Western District of Texas (1984–2003); United States Court of Appeals for the Fifth Circuit (2003–2018)	Texas	retired
Victoria Pratt	Newark Municipal Court (2009–2017)	New York	retired
Stephen Pulido	Alameda County Superior Court (2006–)	California	active
César Quiñones	New York Supreme Court, Criminal Division (1987–1995)	New York	deceased
Connie Quiñones	Los Angeles County Superior Court (2013– )	California	active
Thomas Quiñones	Yonkers City Court (2016– )	New York	active
Nitza I. Quiñones Alejandro	Philadelphia County Court of Common Pleas (1991–2013); United States District Court for the Eastern District of Pennsylvania (2013– )	Pennsylvania	active
Gilbert Ramírez	New York State Supreme Court	New York	retired
Irma Carrillo Ramírez	United States District Court for the Northern District of Texas (2002–2023); United States Court of Appeals for the Fifth Circuit (2023– )	Texas	active
Juan Ramírez Jr.	Florida Third District Court of Appeal (2000–2012)	Florida	retired
Leticia Ramírez	Civil Court of the City of New York (2011– )	New York	active
Manuel A. Ramírez	California Court of Appeal (1990– )	California	active
Nancy Ramírez	Los Angeles County Superior Court (2017- )	California	active
Norma Villarreal Ramírez	Zapata County Court (elec. 1994)	Texas	resigned or lost reelection
Ralph M. Ramírez	Waukesha County Circuit Court (1999– )	Wisconsin	active
Raul Anthony Ramírez	United States District Court for the Eastern District of California (1980–1989)	California	resigned
Víctor Ramírez	San Diego Municipal Court (1979–1998); San Diego Superior Court (1998–2003)	California	retired
Héctor Ramón	Santa Clara County Superior Court (2006–2019)	California	retired
Edgardo Ramos	United States District Court for the Southern District of New York (2011– )	New York	active
Nelva Gonzáles Ramos	United States District Court for the Southern District of Texas (2011– )	Texas	active
Sandra G. Ramos	Cook Judicial Circuit Court (2010– )	Illinois	active
Manuel Real	United States District Court for the Central District of California (1966–2019)	California	deceased
Preciliano Recéndez	Los Angeles County Superior Court (Commissioner: 1991–2005)	California	deceased
Luis Felipe Restrepo	United States District Court for the Eastern District of Pennsylvania (2013–2016); United States Court of Appeals for the Third Circuit (2016– )	Pennsylvania	active
Ana C. Reyes	United States District Court for the District of Columbia (2023– )	Washington, D.C.	active
Jesse Reyes	Illinois Court of Appeals (2013– )	Illinois	active
Peter Reyes Jr.	Minnesota Court of Appeals (2014– )	Minnesota	active
Ramon Reyes	United States District Court for the Eastern District of New York (2006– )	New York	active
Jimmie V. Reyna	United States Court of Appeals for the Federal Circuit (2011– )	Washington, D.C.	active
Renee C. Reyna	San Mateo County Superior Court (2021–)	California	active
Cruz Reynoso	California Court of Appeal, Third District (1976–1982); Supreme Court of California (1982–1987)	California	retired
Clara Rigmaiden	Lane County Circuit Court (2013– )	Oregon	active
Dorothy Comstock Riley	Wayne County Circuit (1972–1976); Michigan Court of Appeals (1976–1982); Michigan Supreme Court (1982–1983; 1985–1997)	Michigan	deceased
Cheryl Ríos (Kingfisher)	Shawnee County District Court Third Judicial District (2008– )	Kansas	active
Dora M. Ríos	Solano County Superior Court (2017– )	California	active
Irene Ríos	Texas Court of Appeals (2016– )	Texas	active
Jaime Ríos	New York City Civil Court and the Housing Court; New York Supreme Court for Queens County (ret. 2013)	New York	retired
Verónica Rivas-Molloy	Texas Court of Appeals (First District) (2020– )	Texas	active
Itsia Rivera	Lake County Domestic Relations Court	Indiana	active
Jenny Rivera	New York Court of Appeals (2013– )	New York	active
Maria Rivera	Superior Court of Contra Costa County (1996–2002); California 1st Appellate District (2002–2018)	California	retired
Richard Rivera	Albany County Court (2015– )	New York	active
Walter Rivera	Greenburgh Town Court, Westchester County (2012-2017); New York State Court of Claims (2017 - )	New York	active
Edgardo Rivera García	Supreme Court of Puerto Rico (2010–2025)	Puerto Rico	retired
Francis M. Robles	Hillsborough Circuit Court (d. 1933)	Florida	died in office
Eduardo C. Robreno	United States District Court for the Eastern District of Pennsylvania (1992–2023)	Pennsylvania	retired
Armando Rodríguez	Fresno Municipal Court (1975–1978); Fresno County Superior Court (1978–1995)	California	deceased
Armando Rodríguez	Precinct 6 (Harris County) (1973–2018)	Texas	retired
Ángela Rodríguez	Precinct 6 (Harris County) (2018– )	Texas	active
Elizabet Rodríguez	Kern County Superior Court (2021– )	California	active
Fernando Rodríguez Jr.	United States District Court for the Southern District of Texas (2018– )	Texas	active
Fiordaliza A. Rodríguez	New York City Family Court, Bronx County (2015– )	New York	active
Jesús A. Rodríguez	Butte County Superior Court (2018– )	California	active
Joseph H. Rodríguez	United States District Court for the District of New Jersey (1985– )	New Jersey	active
Julia Rodríguez	New York State Supreme Court, Bronx County (2013– )	New York	active
Lina Rodríguez	Pima County Superior Court (1984–2004)	Arizona	retired
Liza A. Rodríguez	Texas Court of Appeals (2018– )	Texas	active
Luis A. Rodríguez	Orange County Superior Court (1994–2014)	California	retired
Maite Oronoz Rodríguez	Puerto Rico Supreme Court (2014– )	Puerto Rico	active
Norma Rodríguez	Benton-Franklin Superior Court (2022– )	Washington	active
Raymond Rodríguez	New York City Criminal Court (appt. 2013)	New York	active
Regina M. Rodríguez	United States District Court for the District of Colorado (2021– )	Colorado	active
Víctor A. Rodríguez	Alameda County Superior Court (2017–2021); California 1st Appellate District (2021– )	California	active
Xavier Rodríguez	Texas Supreme Court Justice, Place 5 (2001–2002); United States District Court for the Western District of Texas (2003– )	Texas	active
Yvonne T. Rodríguez	Texas Court of Appeals (2012– )	Texas	active
Sonia Rodríguez-True	Yakima County Superior Court (Commissioner 2021–2022; Judge 2022–)	Washington	active
Paul Roetman	Alaska Second District Superior Court (2010– )	Alaska	active
Yvonne González Rogers	Alameda County Superior Court (2008–2011); United States District Court for the Northern District of California (2011– )	California	active
Marco A. Roldán	Jackson County Circuit Court (1999–2023)	Missouri	retired
Gilbert M. Román	Colorado Court of Appeals (2005– ; Chief Judge: 2021– )	Colorado	active
Jaime Román	Sacramento County Superior Court (2007–2021)	California	retired
Mary Román	Texas District 175 (1993–2016); Bexar County Court of Law (2018– )	Texas	active
Nelson S. Román	United States District Court for the Southern District of New York (2013– )	New York	active
Enrique Romero	Los Angeles County Superior Court (ret. 1999)	California	deceased
Richard Romero	Los Angeles County Superior Court (1989– )	California	active
Llinét Beltré Rosado	New York State Supreme Court, Bronx County (2012– )	New York	active
Diana Rosario	Cook Judicial Circuit Court (2014– )	Illinois	active
Luis Rovira	Colorado District Court (1976–1979); Colorado Supreme Court (1979–1995)	Colorado	retired
Maria Ruhl	Florida 12th Judicial Circuit (2019– )	Florida	active
David A. Ruiz	United States District Court for the Northern District of Ohio (2016– )	Ohio	active
Rodolfo Ruiz	Miami-Dade County Court (2012–2014); Eleventh Judicial Circuit Court of Florida (2014–2019); United States District Court for the Southern District of Florida (2019– )	Florida	active
Vanessa Ruiz	District of Columbia Court of Appeals (1994– )	Washington, D.C.	active
Dennis G. Saab	State Bar of California Court (2019– )	California	active
Esther Salas	United States District Court for the District of New Jersey (2006– )	New Jersey	active
John S. Salazar	Santa Cruz County Superior Court (Commissioner: 1998–2000; Judge: 2000–2022)	California	retired
Fidel Salcedo	Reno Justice Court (1995-2023?)	Nevada	retired?
Diana Saldaña	United States District Court for the Southern District of Texas (2011– )	Texas	active
Gregory H. Saldivar	Santa Clara County Superior Court (Commissioner: 1998–2019)	California	retired
Gabriel P. Sánchez	California Court of Appeal, First Appellate District (2018–2022); United States Court of Appeals for the Ninth Circuit (2022– )	California	active
Héctor Sánchez	Sixth Judicial District Criminal Court (2022– )	Tennessee	active
Juan Ramon Sánchez	United States District Court for the Eastern District of Pennsylvania (2004– )	Pennsylvania	active
Maurice Sánchez	Orange County Superior Court; California Court of Appeal, Third Appellate District (2022– )	California	active
Robert E. Sánchez DuFour	Los Angeles County Superior Court (2020– )	California	active
Brian Sandoval	United States District Court for the District of Nevada (2005–2009)	Nevada	resigned
Gerardo Sandoval	San Francisco County Superior Court (2008– )	California	active
Robert J. Sandoval	Los Angeles County Superior Court (2001–2006)	California	deceased
Irma Vidal Santaella	New York Supreme Court (appt. 1983)	New York	deceased
Ray A. Santana	Los Angeles County Superior Court (2008–2021)	California	retired
Beatriz Santiago	Cook Judicial Circuit Court (2012– )	Illinois	active
Virna L. Santos	Fresno County Superior Court (2022– )	California	active
Salvador Sarmiento	Orange County Superior Court (Commissioner: 1997–2003; Judge: 2003– )	California	active
Valeriano Saucedo	Tulare County Superior Court (2001–2015)	California	removed
Nathan R. Scott	Orange County Superior Court (2012– )	California	active
Daniel Segura	San Diego County Superior Court (2021–)	California	active
Robert Segura	New Iberia City Court (ret. 2014)	Louisiana	retired
Clarissa Silva	Texas Court of Appeals (2021– )	Texas	active
Cristina D. Silva	Nevada District Court (2019–2022); United States District Court for the District of Nevada (2022– )	Nevada	active
Phillip A. Silva	Fresno County Superior Court (appt. 1998)	California	retired
Rafael A. Sivilla-Jones	Santa Clara County Superior Court (2021–)	California	active
Jorge Antonio Solis	United States District Court for the Northern District of Texas (1991–2016)	Texas	retired
Bertila Soto	Eleventh Judicial Circuit in Miami-Dade County, Florida (2002– )	Florida	active
Faviola A. Soto	New York State Court of Claims (2006– )	New York	active
James A. Soto	Santa Cruz County Superior Court (2001–2014); United States District Court for the District of Arizona (2014– )	Arizona	active
Sonia Sotomayor	United States District Court for the Southern District of New York (1992–1998); United States Court of Appeals for the Second Circuit (1998–2009); Supreme Court of the United States (2009– )	Washington, D.C.	active
Kara Fernández Stoll	United States Court of Appeals for the Federal Circuit (2015– )	Washington, D.C.	active
José A. Suárez	Connecticut Appellate Court (2020– )	Connecticut	active
J. Matias Tafoya	Phoenix Municipal Court (1984–2003); Presiding City Magistrate (2003–2020)	Arizona	retired
Robert S. Tafoya	Kern County Superior Court (2002–2021)	California	retired
Hilda G. Tagle	United States District Court for the Southern District of Texas (1998– )	Texas	active
David Talamante	Maricopa County Superior Court (1999–2019)	Arizona	retired
Mark Talamantes	Marin County Superior Court (2012– )	California	active
Sergio C. Tapia II	Los Angeles County Superior Court (2013– )	California	active
Charles Tejada	New York State Supreme Court (1987–1995)	New York	deceased
Jaime Eduardo Tijerina	Texas Court of Appeals (2019– )	Texas	active
Jose Victor Toledo	United States District Court for the District of Puerto Rico (1970–1980)	Puerto Rico	deceased
Edward A. Torpoco	San Francisco County Superior Court (2014– )	California	active
Leonard Torrealba	Los Angeles County Superior Court (2020– )	California	active
Analisa Torres	New York City Criminal Court (2000–2002); New York City Civil Court (2003–2004); New York Supreme Court (2004–2013); United States District Court for the Southern District of New York (2013– )	New York	active
Edwin Torres	New York State Supreme Court (1980–2008)	New York	retired
Frank Torres	Supreme Court of the State of New York (1986–2001)	New York	deceased
Isidore Torres	Wayne County court system	Michigan	deceased
Yolanda V. Torres	Orange County Superior Court (2022– )	California	active
Juan R. Torruella	United States District Court for the District of Puerto Rico (1974–1984); United States Court of Appeals for the First Circuit (1984–2020)	Puerto Rico	deceased
Martín Travieso	Puerto Rico Supreme Court (1936–1948)	Puerto Rico	deceased
Delia Trevino	Alameda County Superior Court (2015– )	California	active
Emily García Uhrig	Los Angeles County Superior Court (2018– )	California	active
Juan Ulloa	Imperial County Superior Court (1995–2022)	California	retired
Ricardo M. Urbina	Superior Court of the District of Columbia (1981–1994); United States District Court for the District of Columbia (1994–2012)	Washington, D.C.	retired
David H. Urias	United States District Court for the District of New Mexico (2022– )	New Mexico	active
Franklin U. Valderrama	Circuit Court of Cook County (2007–2020); United States District Court for the Northern District of Illinois (2020– )	Illinois	active
Andrew Valdéz	Utah Third District Juvenile Court (1993–2013)	Utah	retired
Jesús Valencia, Jr.	Santa Clara County Superior Court (Commissioner: 2006–2009; Judge: 2009– )	California	active
Lori I. Valenzuela	Texas Court of Appeals (2021– )	Texas	active
Cynthia Valenzuela Dixon	State Bar Court of California (2016–2024); United States District Court for the Central District of California (2024– )	California	active
Vanessa W. Vallarta	Monterey County Superior Court (2013– )	California	active
Fernando Valle	Orange County Superior Court (2022– )	California	active
Carlos Varela	San Diego County Superior Court (2018– )	California	active
Javier E. Vargas	NYC Housing Court (2013-2015); Family Court of the State of New York (2015–2022); Court of Claims (2022- )	New York	active
Jeannette Vargas	United States District Court for the Southern District of New York (2024– )	New York	active
Julie J. Vargas	New Mexico Court of Appeals (2016–2021); New Mexico Supreme Court (2021– )	New Mexico	active
Luis R. Vargas	San Diego Superior Court (ret. 2012)	California	retired
Carlos E. Vázquez	Los Angeles County Superior Court (2010– )	California	active
Emily Vásquez	Sacramento County Superior Court (2001–2022)	California	active
John Michael Vázquez	United States District Court for the District of New Jersey (2016–2023)	New Jersey	resigned
Juan F. Vásquez	United States Tax Court (1995– )	Washington, D.C.	active
Martha Vázquez	United States District Court for the District of New Mexico (1993– )	New Mexico	active
Salvador Vásquez	Lake County Criminal Court (2003– )	Indiana	active
María S. Vázquez-Doles	Supreme Court 9th Judicial District (2013– )	New York	active
Louie Vega	Kern County Superior Court (Commissioner: 1998–2008; Judge: 2008–2021)	California	retired
Valorie Vega	Eighth Judicial District Court (1999–2015)	Nevada	retired
Filemon Vela Sr.	United States District Court for the Southern District of Texas (1980–2004)	Texas	deceased
Bernardo P. Velasco	Pima County Superior Court (1985–2000); United States District Court for the District of Arizona (2000–2019)	Arizona	active
David Velásquez	South Orange County Municipal Court (1988–1990); Orange County Superior Court (1990–2011)	California	retired
Camille Vélez-Rivé	United States District Court for the District of Puerto Rico (2004– )	Puerto Rico	active
Bernard Veljacic	Clark County’s 33rd Superior Court (2014–2020); Washington State Court of Appeals (2020– )	Washington	active
Lourdes M. Ventura	New York City Civil Court (2019); New York State Supreme Court (2020–);	New York	active
Hernán D. Vera	Los Angeles County Superior Court (2020–2023); United States District Court for the Central District of California (2023– )	California	active
Yvette Verastegui	Los Angeles County Superior Court (2010– )	California	active
María del Mar Verdin	Maricopa County Superior Court (1999–2014)	Arizona	retired
Lawrence J. Vilardo	United States District Court for the Western District of New York (2015– )	New York	active
Ruben A. Villalobos	Stanislaus County Superior Court (2014– )	California	active
Jesse Villalpando	Lake Superior Court (2000–2018)	Indiana	retired
Jose A. Villanueva	Cuyahoga County Court of Common Pleas (1988–2016)	Ohio	retired
Xapuri Villapudua	San Joaquin County Superior Court (2007– )	California	active
Luis M. Villarreal	Solano County Superior Court (1982–2005)	California	deceased
Lydia M. Villarreal	Monterey County Superior Court (2001– )	California	active
Stephen Villarreal	Pima County Superior Court (1998–2016)	Arizona	retired
Víctor Villarreal	Webb County Commissioners Court (2017– )	Texas	active
Helen Voutsinas	Nassau County District Court (2010–2018); New York State Supreme Court (2018– )	New York	active
Kim McLane Wardlaw	United States District Court for the Central District of California (1995–1998); United States Court of Appeals for the Ninth Circuit (1998– )	California	active
Dalila Argaez Wendlandt	Massachusetts Appeals Court (2017–2020); Massachusetts Supreme Judicial Court (2020– )	Massachusetts	active
Omar A. Williams	Connecticut Superior Court (2016–2021); United States District Court for the District of Connecticut (2021– )	Connecticut	active
María Elena Wood	Riverside County Superior Court (2021– )	California	active
Linda Reyna Yanez	Texas Court of Appeals (1993–2010)	Texas	retired
Gloria G. Ybarra	Maricopa County Superior Court (1977–1991)	Arizona	resigned
Frank R. Zapata	United States District Court for the District of Arizona (1994– )	Arizona	active
Joseph A. Zayas	New York City Criminal Court of Queens County (2003–2016); New York Supreme Court 11th Judicial District (2016– )	New York	active
Marilyn Zayas-Davis	First District Court of Appeals (2016– )	Ohio	active
Carrie A. Zepeda	Santa Clara County Superior Court (2003– )	California	active
Barbara Zúñiga	Contra Costa County Superior Court (1994–2014)	California	retired

== Other topics of interest ==
- List of first minority male lawyers and judges in the United States
- List of first women lawyers and judges in the United States
- List of African-American jurists
- List of Asian American jurists
- List of Jewish American jurists
- List of LGBT jurists in the United States
- List of Native American jurists

== See also ==
- Benjamin N. Cardozo, United States Supreme Court justice of Portuguese-Jewish descent
