= Ruth Bermudez Montenegro =

American judge (born 1967)

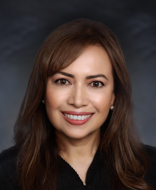

Judge of the United States District Court for the Southern District of California
- Incumbent
- Assumed office March 30, 2022
- Appointed by: Joe Biden
- Preceded by: John A. Houston

Magistrate Judge of the United States District Court for the Southern District of California
- In office August 15, 2018 – March 30, 2022

Judge of the Imperial County Superior Court
- In office January 2, 2015 – 2018
- Appointed by: Jerry Brown
- In office March 6, 2012 – January 7, 2013
- Appointed by: Jerry Brown
- Preceded by: Barrett J. Foerster
- Succeeded by: L. Brooks Anderholt

Personal details
- Born: Ruth Parra Bermudez; 1967 (age 58–59) Brawley, California, U.S.
- Party: Democratic
- Education: Imperial Valley College (AA) Clarion University of Pennsylvania (BA); University of California, Los Angeles (JD)

Ruth Bermudez Montenegro (née Ruth Parra Bermudez, born 1967) is an American lawyer who has served as a United States district judge of the United States District Court for the Southern District of California since 2022. She served as a United States magistrate judge of the same court from 2018 to 2022.

== Education ==
Montenegro received her Associate of Arts, with honors, from Imperial Valley College in 1987, her Bachelor of Arts, summa cum laude, from Clarion University of Pennsylvania in 1989 and her Juris Doctor from the UCLA School of Law.

== Career ==
Montenegro was previously an attorney at Horton, Knox, Carter & Foote, LLP in El Centro from 1993 to 2000. She then served as assistant superintendent for human resources and administrative services for the El Centro Elementary School District in Imperial County from 2002 to 2011 and served as Director of Human Resources for Imperial Valley College from 2000 to 2002. She was assistant county counsel for Imperial County from 2011 to 2012 and also served as a deputy county counsel IV in 2000.

== Judicial career ==
=== State judicial service ===
From 2012 to 2013 and again from 2015 to 2018, Montenegro served as a judge on the Imperial County Superior Court in California. She served as the Imperial County Superior Court's Family Support Commissioner from 2013 to 2015.

=== Federal judicial service ===
==== United States magistrate judge tenure ====
She was appointed as a United States Magistrate Judge for the United States District Court for the Southern District of California on August 15, 2018. Her service as a magistrate terminated on March 30, 2022 when she was commissioned as a district judge.

==== District court service ====
On November 3, 2021, President Joe Biden nominated Montenegro to serve as a United States district judge of the United States District Court for the Southern District of California. President Biden nominated Montenegro to the seat vacated by Judge John A. Houston, who assumed senior status on February 6, 2018. On December 15, 2021, a hearing on her nomination was held before the Senate Judiciary Committee. On January 3, 2022, her nomination was returned to the President under Rule XXXI, Paragraph 6 of the United States Senate; she was later renominated the same day. On January 20, 2022, her nomination was reported out of committee by a 14–8 vote. On March 16, 2022, the Senate invoked cloture on her nomination by a 57–42 vote. On March 22, 2022, her nomination was confirmed by a 55–41 vote. She received her judicial commission on March 30, 2022.

== See also ==
- List of Hispanic and Latino American jurists

Legal offices
Preceded by John A. Houston	Judge of the United States District Court for the Southern District of California; 2022–present	Incumbent
