= City of Fresno discolored water investigation =

2016 water quality investigation in Fresno, California

In January 2016, Fresno, California resident Jeanette Grider made a post on social media website Nextdoor.com, asking neighbors whether they were having problems with discolored water. City employees had previously told Grider and other affected residents that the water was fine and blamed the discolored water problem on residents' galvanized iron plumbing. Grider's posting generated many responses from neighbors experiencing the discolored water issue, causing city officials to finally take action and investigate, even though complaints about water quality date back to at least 2004, when the city’s Northeast Surface Water Treatment Plant became operational.

The City's Department of Public Utilities, Water Division, started testing water at the taps of affected residents' homes, which included levels of iron, zinc, copper, and in some homes, lead. At a public meeting held in June 2016, the City of Fresno's Public Utilities Director, Thomas Esqueda, told attendees that their galvanized plumbing were corroding and leaching iron, zinc, and lead into their water, and recommended replumbing. In July 2016, the City expanded its investigation to up to 15,000 homes and determined the discolored water problem appeared related to galvanized pipe or fixture corrosion within the area served by the Northeast Fresno Surface Water Treatment Facility, either receiving treated surface water alone or some combination of surface water and groundwater. As of August 2016, more than 1,500 northeast Fresno residents registered complaints or requested testing of their water. The City retained corrosion experts for its Discolored Water Investigation, including Marc Edwards and Vernon Snoeyink. The City's Discolored Water Investigation revealed that 64 out of 376 homes with test results, and 94 out of 1,136 taps had lead concentrations above 15 parts per billion. The U.S. Environmental Protection Agency requires corrective action above this threshold. The City's corrosion experts explained that changes and fluctuations in the water chemistry from the two sources of water had disrupted the protective rust scale formed on the interior of galvanized plumbing in residents' homes. As Edwards explained, “the water utility does have a responsibility, because they’re choosing to take it on beyond the requirements of the law … to treat that water in such a way that it reduces the red-water complaints, reduces the discoloration and extends the life of that galvanized iron infrastructure for as long as possible.”

City officials admitted that the city had failed to properly respond to early complaints of discolored water in 2004 and 2005, or report all complaints to the California State Water Resources Control Board as required by law, instead providing bottled water to residents who had reported discolored water early on. A representative for the California State Water Resources Control Board, Kassy Chauhan, was quoted as stating: “We’ve had one record of a very short isolated event back in 2005 and that’s the extent of our records.”. The City's Chief of Water Operations was placed on administrative leave over discrepancies with reporting water quality issues. Additionally, the City was advised in a 1998 treatability study that introducing surface water to the city's existing groundwater system would require corrosion control and that “…portions of the system may remain at risk for excessive metal release, colored water and other aesthetic concerns.”. State official Kassy Chauhan stated: "Definitely having proper corrosion control at the water entering the homes is important. That could have played a role.”. During a public meeting in August, 2016, Chauhan informed affected residents that the City had been operating its water system in violation of its permit. Nevertheless, state officials indicated it was unlikely the City would be held accountable for mistakes made ten years ago.

A class action lawsuit brought by affected northeast Fresno residents against the City is pending in the Fresno Superior Court.
