= Edmund Ponce de Leon =

American judge

Edmund Ponce de León was the first Hispanic-American to be appointed as a Presiding Judge in the history of the Circuit Court of Cook County, Illinois.

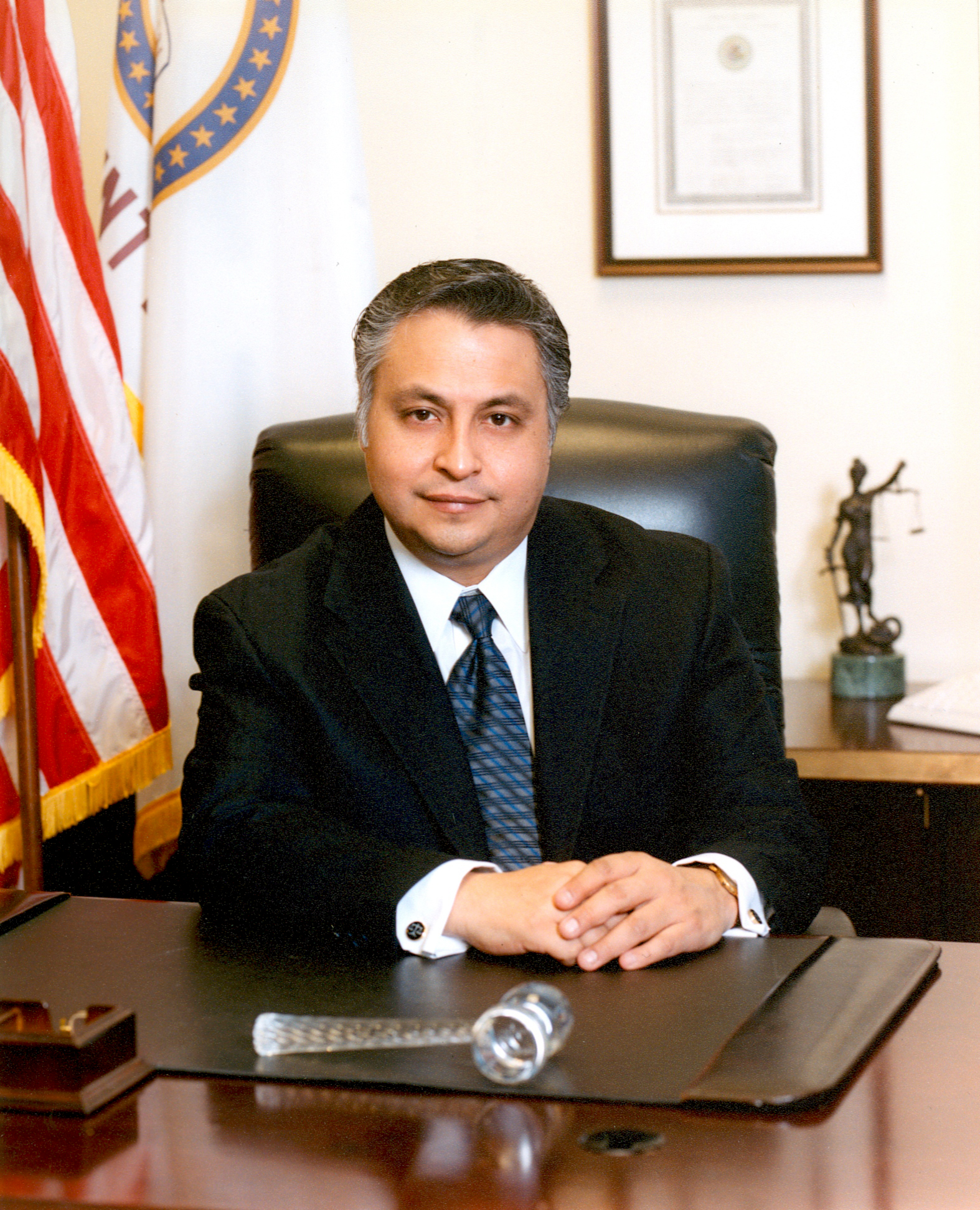
Judge Edmund Ponce de León

Ponce de León was originally elected as a Judge from the 6th Subcircuit of the Circuit Court of Cook County, Illinois, in November 1996. He ran for re-election in 2002, 2008 and 2014 county-wide and was retained as a judge. He retired as a judge on December 31, 2016. Judge Ponce de León was initially assigned to the Domestic Relations Division, and in 2000 he was assigned to the Law Division, Commercial Section.

Ponce de León was appointed presiding judge of the Fourth Municipal District (District 4 Maywood, Illinois) in 2002. In 2010 he was appointed Presiding Judge of the County Division of the Circuit Court of Cook County. In June 2015, he was assigned to the Law Division hearing jury cases, pre-trial motions and Tax and Miscellaneous matters.

He retired as a judge in December 2016.

== See also ==
- List of Hispanic and Latino American jurists
