= Linda Reyna Yáñez =

American judge

Linda Reyna Yáñez (born Soila Linda Reyna, November 30, 1948) is a former American judge, Harvard Law clinical instructor and the former Regional Counsel for the Mexican American Legal Defense and Education Fund in Chicago, Illinois. She was the first Hispanic woman to serve on a Texas appeals court.

== Early life ==
Yáñez was born in her family home in Rio Hondo, Texas. She was raised by her grandparents while her parents traveled the country for work, occasionally working herself in local cotton fields. Yáñez was socially and academically successful, and was active in the National Honor Society and student government, though she was affected by racial discrimination in her segregated school. After high school, she enrolled in Pan American University (later the University of Texas–Pan American and now the University of Texas–Rio Grande Valley) in Edinburg, Texas.

== Education ==
At Pan American University, Yáñez originally planned to study engineering, but ultimately followed the Inter-American Studies program. She was a member of the Young Democrats and Model Organization for American States, and graduated with a Bachelor of Arts in 1970. After a period of time working in Washington, D.C. for then-President Richard Nixon's Committee on Opportunity for the Spanish-Speaking, and in Weslaco, Texas as a schoolteacher, Yáñez earned her Juris Doctor from Texas Southern University in Houston. She also holds a Master of Laws degree from the University of Virginia School of Law.

== See also ==
- List of Hispanic and Latino American jurists
