= John A. Houston =

American judge (born 1952)

John Allen Houston
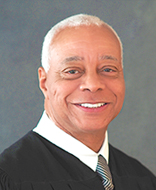

Senior Judge of the United States District Court for the Southern District of California
- Incumbent
- Assumed office February 6, 2018

Judge of the United States District Court for the Southern District of California
- In office October 7, 2003 – February 6, 2018
- Appointed by: George W. Bush
- Preceded by: Seat established by 116 Stat. 1758
- Succeeded by: Ruth Bermudez Montenegro

Magistrate Judge of the United States District Court for the Southern District of California
- In office 1998–2003

Personal details
- Born: John Allen Houston; February 6, 1952 (age 74) Greensboro, North Carolina, U.S.
- Education: North Carolina A & T State University (BS); University of Miami (JD)

John Allen Houston (born February 6, 1952) is a senior United States district judge of the United States District Court for the Southern District of California.

== Early life and education ==
Houston was born in Greensboro, North Carolina. He attended Lincoln Junior High School and Ben L. Smith High School. He received a Bachelor of Science degree from North Carolina A & T State University in 1974. In 1977 received a Juris Doctor from the University of Miami School of Law.

== Career ==
Houston served in the United States Army Judge Advocate General Corps from 1978 to 1981. He later served in the Army Reserve from 1981 to 2003. From 1981 to 1998, he served as an assistant United States attorney of the U.S. Attorney's Office for the Southern District of California; he served in the Chief Asset Forfeiture Unit from 1987 to 1994. From 1994 to 1996, Houston was a senior counsel for Asset Forfeiture, and from 1996 to 1998 he was senior financial litigation counsel.

=== Federal judicial service ===
From 1998 to 2003, Houston served as a United States magistrate judge for the United States District Court for the Southern District of California in San Diego. He was nominated by President George W. Bush on May 1, 2003 to be a United States district judge of the same court. He was confirmed by the United States Senate on October 2, 2003, and received his commission on October 7, 2003. He assumed senior status on February 6, 2018.

== See also ==
- List of African-American federal judges
- List of African-American jurists

== Sources ==
Legal offices
Preceded by Seat established by 116 Stat. 1758	Judge of the United States District Court for the Southern District of California; 2003–2018	Succeeded by Ruth Bermudez Montenegro
