= Ventura County Superior Court =

California superior court with jurisdiction over Ventura Country

Superior Court of California, County of Ventura
- Established: 1872
- Jurisdiction: Ventura County, California
- Location: Main: Ventura; East County: Simi Valley; Juvenile: Oxnard
- Appeals to: California Court of Appeal for the Second District, Division Six
- Website: ventura.courts.ca.gov

Presiding Judge
- Currently: Hon. Matthew P. Guasco
- Since: Jan 1, 2025
- Lead position ends: Dec 31, 2026

Assistant Presiding Judge
- Currently: Hon. Ryan J. Wright
- Since: Jan 1, 2025
- Lead position ends: Dec 31, 2026

Court Executive Officer
- Currently: Kate Bieker
- Since: Apr 14, 2025

The Superior Court of California, County of Ventura, is the California superior court with jurisdiction over Ventura County.

== History ==
Ventura County was formed on March 22, 1872. The original Ventura County Courthouse was completed in 1875 by William Dewey Hobson and T. B. Steepleton from a design by Hobson. Additions were made in 1879 and 1884, and the building was remodeled in 1900. The first courthouse was demolished around 1920; the site is now occupied by the May Henning School on Santa Clara Street.

Ventura City Hall, which formerly was the Ventura County Courthouse from 1913 to 1968. Photographed by Carol Highsmith in 2012.

A bond measure was passed, authorizing US$150,000 (equivalent to $5,060,000 in 2024) for a new courthouse in 1911. The new Ventura County Courthouse was designed by architect Albert C. Martin Sr. and completed in 1912. The new building was officially dedicated on July 7, 1913. A new jail wing was added in 1931–32. After the 1912 building was declared unsafe in November 1968, the City of Ventura purchased the 1912 building and it was listed on the National Register of Historic Places in 1971. After the city completed an extensive renovation, partially defrayed by grants from the United States Department of Housing and Urban Development and the Economic Development Administration, it has served as the Ventura City Hall since 1974.

The County of Ventura purchased land in eastern Ventura for a new Government Center. The current main courtrooms and administrative offices of the Ventura County Superior Court are at the Ventura Hall of Justice, which was completed in 1980 as part of Phase 2 of the Ventura County Government Center. The design is credited to the architectural firms led by John Carl Warnecke and Dan Dworsky.

The East County Courthouse in Simi Valley opened in March 1991. Although the East County Courthouse was intended to provide services for communities east of the Conejo Grade, it was nearly closed in 1993 over a budget dispute and only staffed by court commissioners, whose scope was limited to traffic, small claims, and family cases until 1995.

== Venues ==
Ventura County Superior Court locations:
1 Hall of Justice, 800 S Victoria Ave (Ventura)
2 Juvenile Justice, 4353 E Vineyard Ave (Oxnard)
3 East County, 3855 Alamo St (Simi Valley)
4 Ventura City Hall, 501 Poli St (Ventura, 1912–68)

The main court is located at the Ventura Hall of Justice in Ventura. Juvenile cases are primarily held at the Juvenile Justice Center in Oxnard.

Cases are also held at the East County Courthouse in Simi Valley. It is notable as the site of the 1992 trial for the police officers who were accused of beating Rodney King. The East County Courthouse had opened in 1991.
