= Riverside County Superior Court =

California state court with jurisdiction over Riverside County

Superior Court of California, County of Riverside
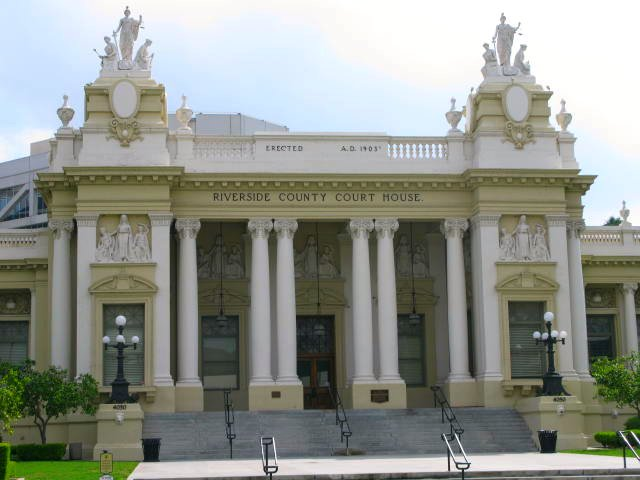
- Riverside Historic Courthouse in 2009
- Interactive map of Superior Court of California, County of Riverside
- Established: 1893
- Jurisdiction: Riverside County, California
- Location: Banning; Blythe; Corona; Hemet; Indio; Menifee; Moreno Valley; Murrieta; Palm Springs; Riverside; Temecula
- Appeals to: California Court of Appeal for the Fourth District, Division Two
- Website: riverside.courts.ca.gov

Presiding Judge
- Currently: Hon. Jacqueline C. Jackson
- Since: Jan 1, 2025
- Lead position ends: Dec 31, 2026

Assistant Presiding Judge
- Currently: Hon. Dean Benjamini
- Since: Jan 1, 2025

Court Executive Officer
- Currently: Jason Galkin
- Since: May 22, 2023

The Superior Court of California, County of Riverside, also known as the Riverside County Superior Court, is the California superior courts with jurisdiction over Riverside County.

== History ==
Riverside County was formed in 1893 from San Bernardino and San Diego counties.

The cornerstone for the first permanent Riverside County Courthouse was laid on May 7, 1903, and the building was completed in June 1904. The Beaux Arts courthouse occupies nearly one city block and is modeled on the Grand Palais in Paris. Franklin P. Burnham is credited as the architect.

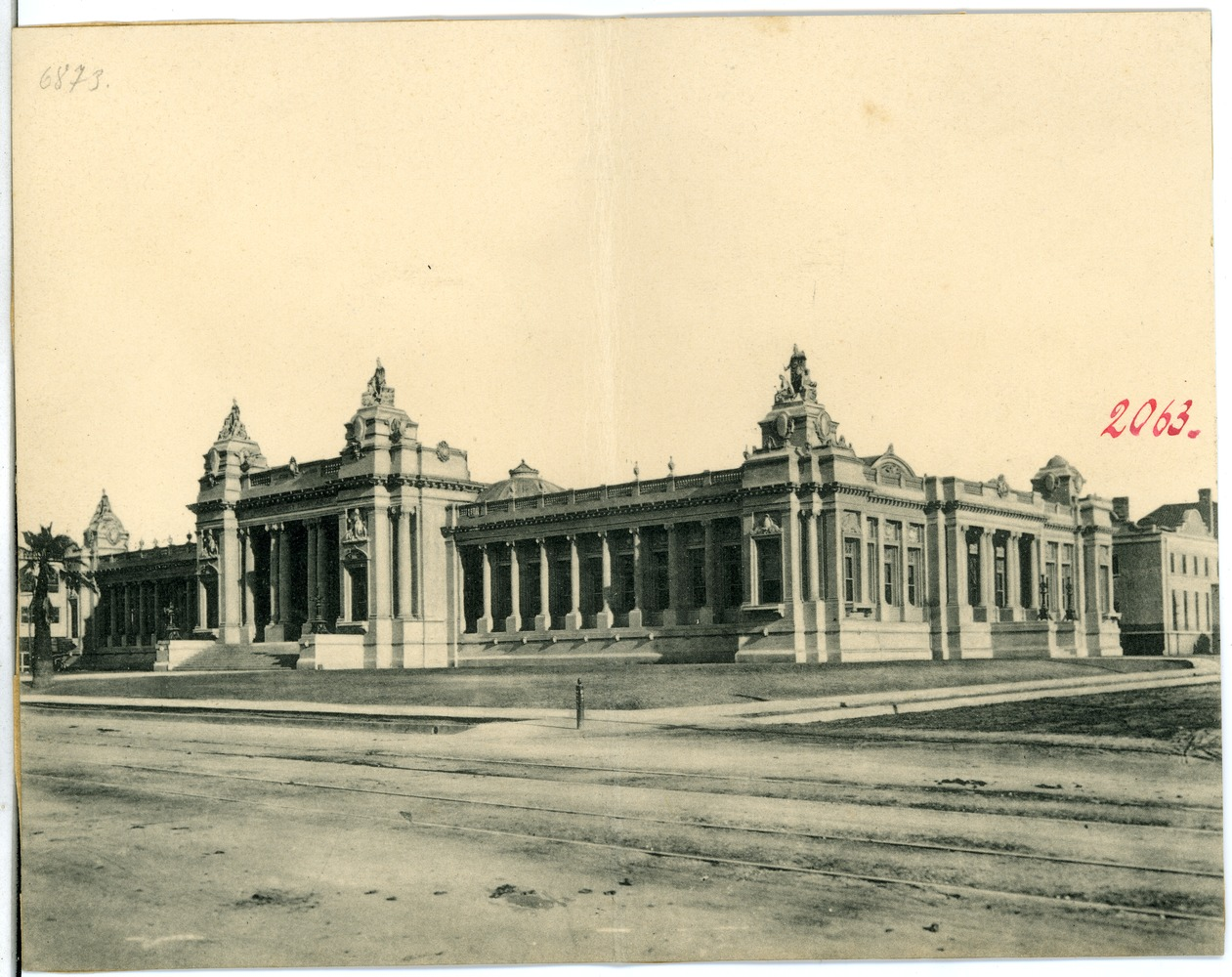
Riverside County Courthouse, 1906

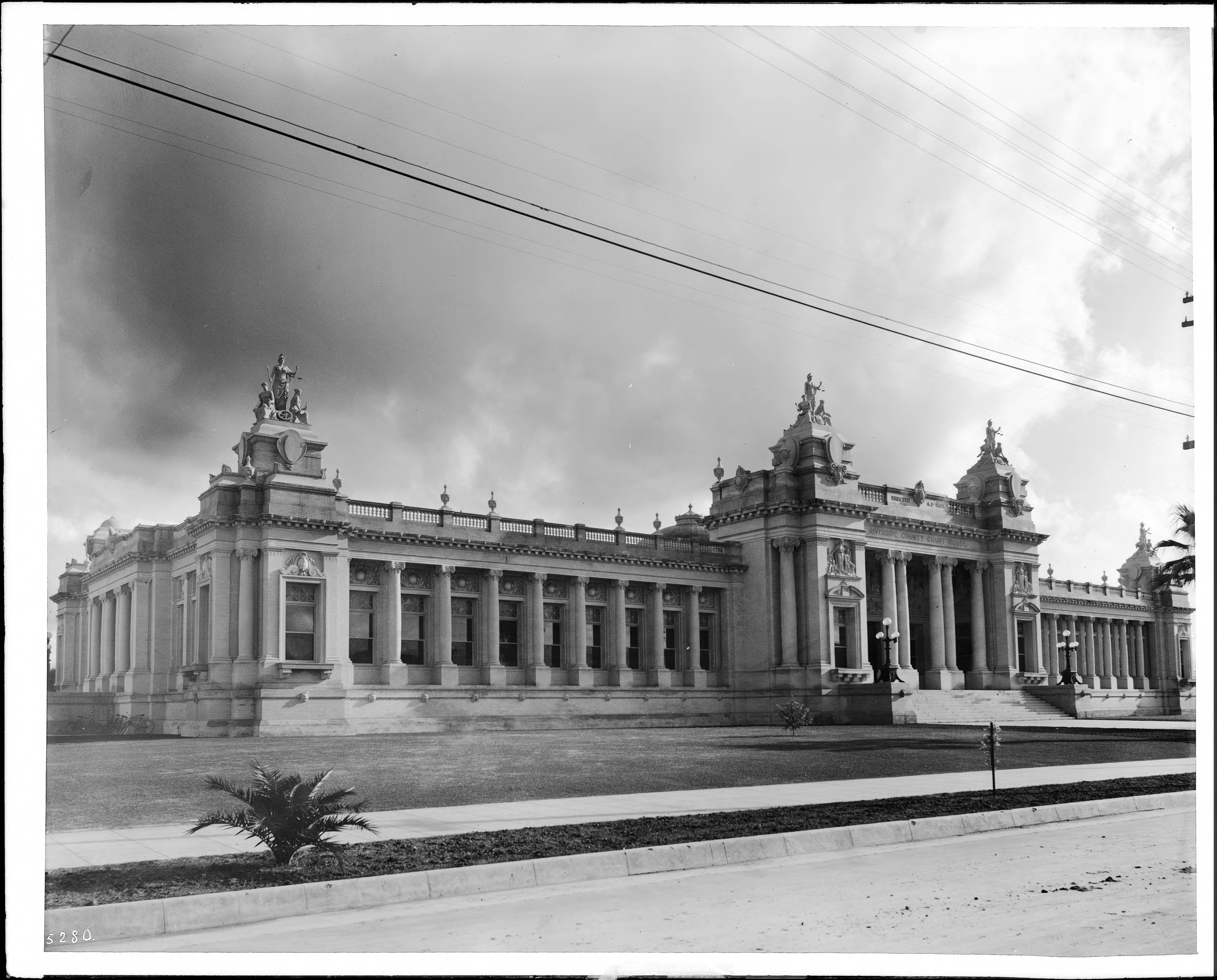
c. 1910

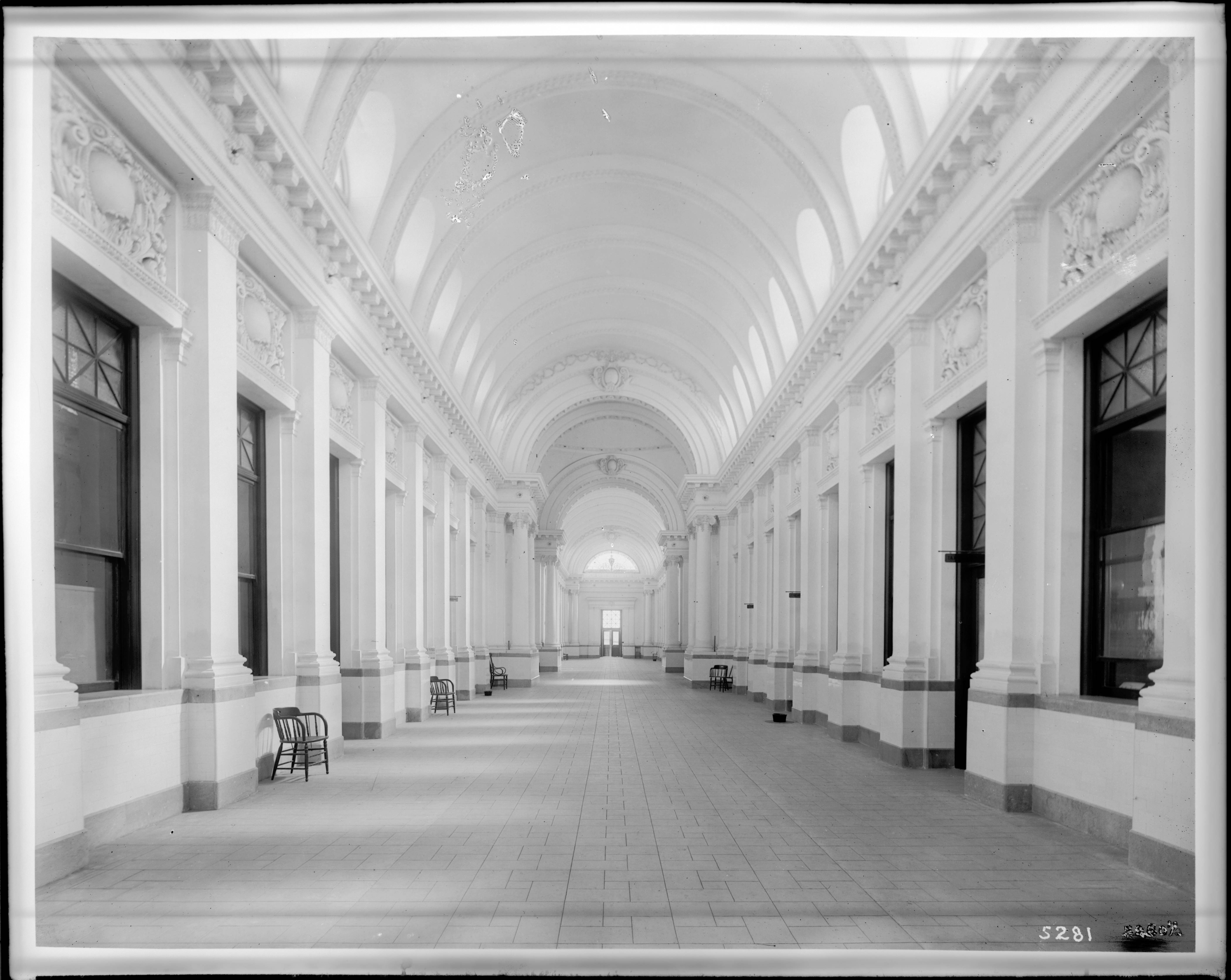
Interior view, c. 1910

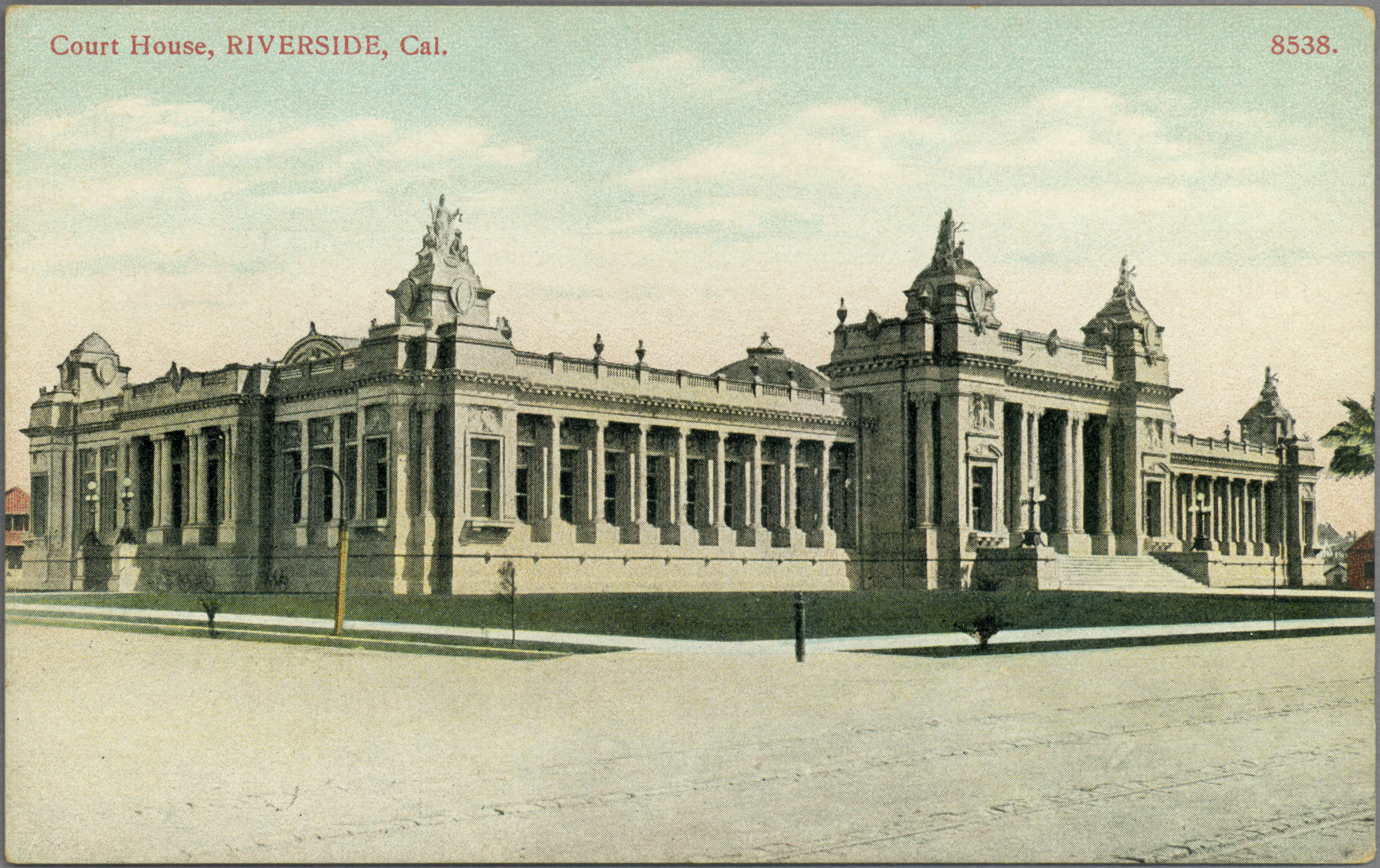
Postcard, dated prior to 1919

== Election history ==
The 2024 Riverside County, California Superior Court election was held on March 5, 2024, and November 5, 2024, to elect the judge of Riverside County, California. It saw the election of Elizabeth Tucker.

=== 2024 ===
==== First round ====
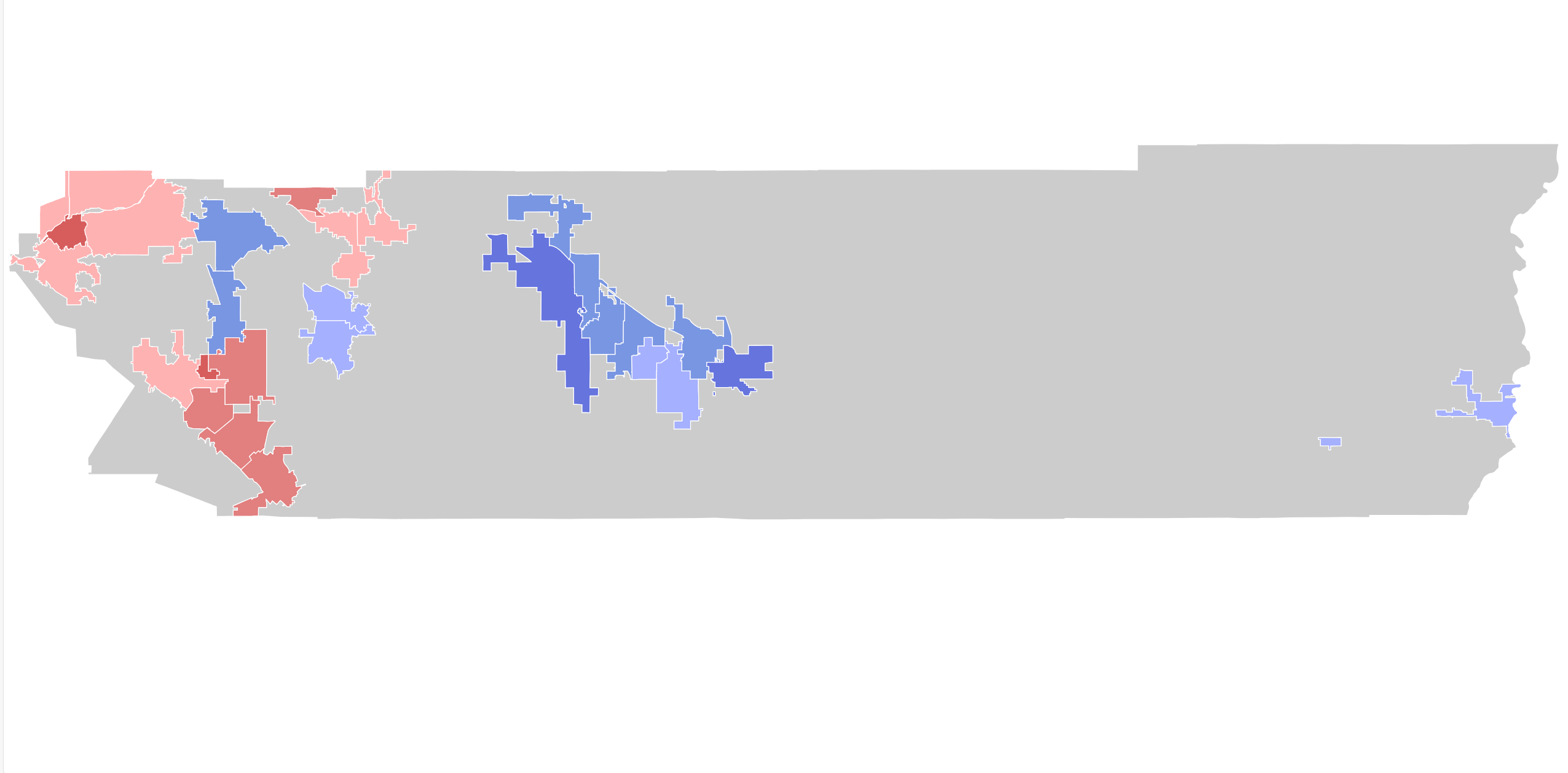
First Round Results by incorporated city
Legend
- Tucker — 60-70%
- Tucker — 50-60%
- Tucker — 40-50%
- Pfohl — 40-50%
- Pfohl — 50-60%
- Pfohl — 60-70%

2024 Riverside County superior court election first round results
Candidate	Votes	%
Gerald Pfohl	151,156	44.48
Elizabeth Tucker	143,706	42.28
Jeffrey Kirk	44,993	13.24
Total Votes	339,855	100

==== Runoff ====
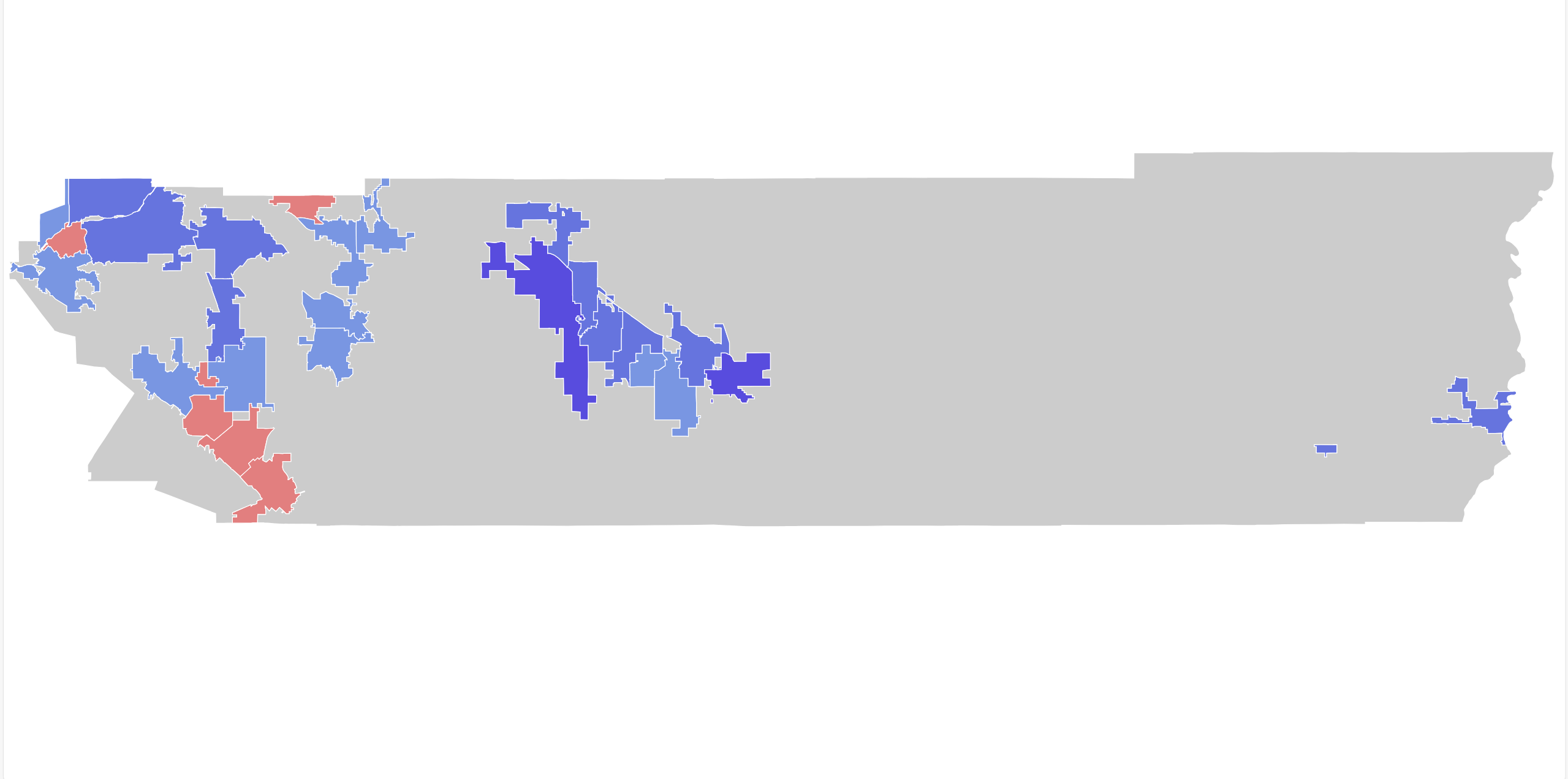
Runoff Results by incorporated city
Legend
- Tucker — 70-80%
- Tucker — 60-70%
- Tucker — 50-60%
- Pfohl — 50-60%

2024 Riverside County superior court election runoff results
Candidate	Votes	%
Elizabeth Tucker	483,252	58.06%
Gerald Pfohl	349,075	41.94%
Total votes	832,327	100

== Venues ==
Riverside County Superior Court locations:
1 Banning Justice Center, 311 E Ramsey St
2 Blythe, 265 N Broadway
3 Corona, 505 S Buena Vista Rm 201
4 Larson Justice Center, 46-200 Oasis St (Indio)
5 Menifee Justice Center, 27401 Menifee Center Dr (Menifee)
6 Moreno Valley, 13800 Heacock St Bldg #D201
7 Palm Springs, 3255 E Tahquitz Canyon Wy
8 Riverside Family Law, 4175 Main St (Riverside)
Riverside Hall of Justice, 4100 Main St (Riverside)
Riverside Historic Courthouse, 4050 Main St (Riverside)
9 Riverside Juvenile, 9991 County Farm Rd (Riverside)
10 Southwest Justice Center, 30755-D Auld Rd (Murrieta)
Southwest Juvenile, 30755-G Auld Rd (Murrieta)

As of 2026, Riverside County Superior Court operates thirteen courthouses divided into three regions:

- Western
  - Banning
  - Corona
  - Moreno Valley
  - Riverside (county seat) (4 distinct courthouses)
- Mid-County
  - Menifee (Menifee Justice Center)
  - Murrieta (2 distinct courthouses)
- Desert
  - Blythe
  - Indio
  - Palm Springs

The Menifee Justice Center opened on July 8, 2024, replacing court operations previously housed at the Hemet Courthouse. The Temecula Courthouse closed on December 23, 2024, with its remaining probate and self-help services transferred to the Southwest Justice Center in Murrieta.
