= San Mateo County Superior Court =

Californian superior court

Superior Court of California, County of San Mateo
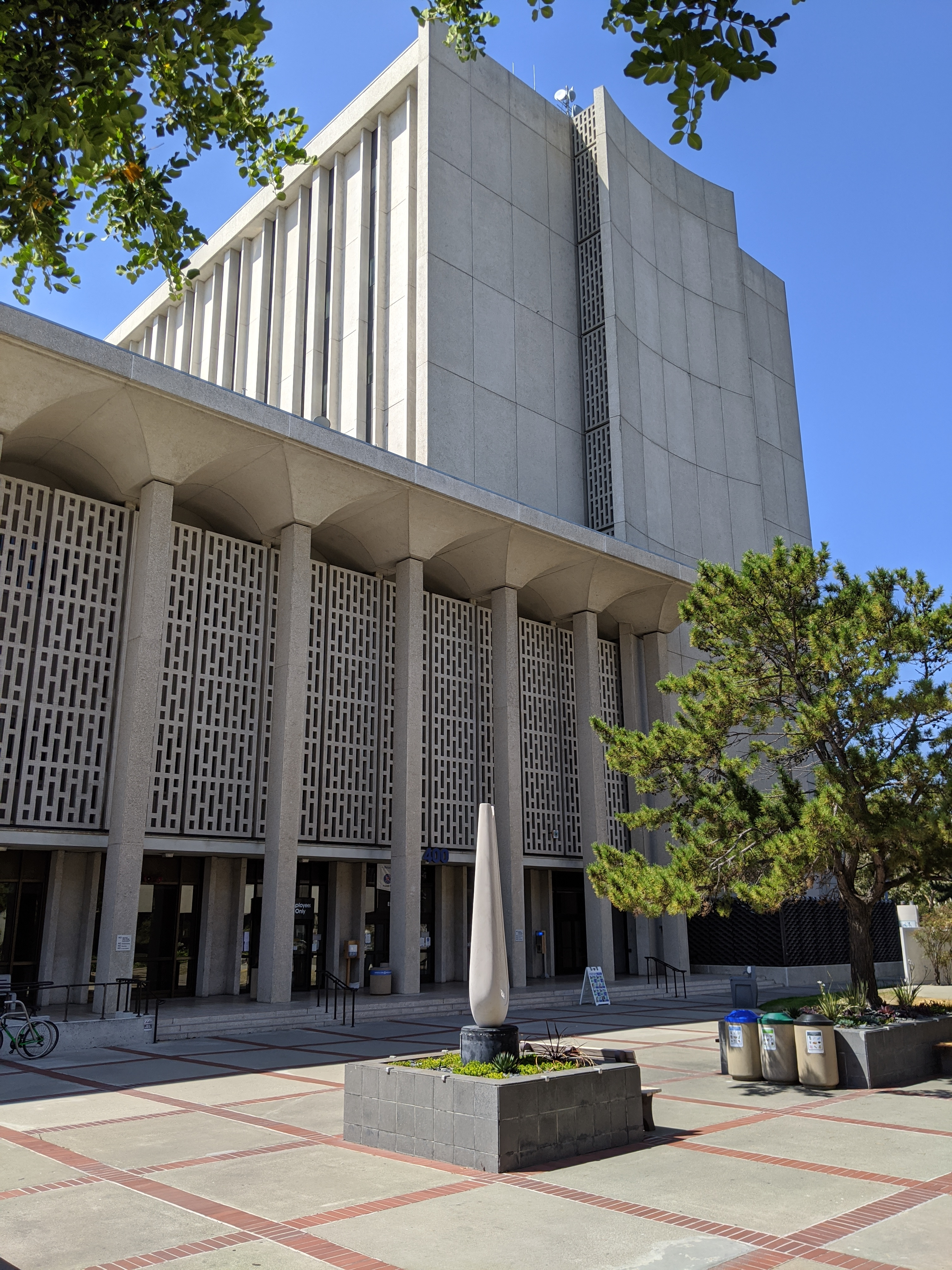
- Hall of Justice and Records; Redwood City (Southern Branch)
- Established: 1858
- Jurisdiction: San Mateo County, California
- Location: Southern: Redwood City; Northern: South San Francisco; Juvenile: San Mateo; Central: San Mateo (closed)
- Appeals to: California Court of Appeal for the First District
- Annual budget: $43.6 M (FY 2025–26)
- Website: sanmateocourt.org

Presiding Judge
- Currently: Hon. Stephanie G. Garratt
- Since: Jan 2, 2025
- Lead position ends: Dec 31, 2026

Assistant Presiding Judge
- Currently: Hon. Rachael Holt
- Since: Jan 2, 2025
- Lead position ends: Dec 31, 2026

Court Executive Officer
- Currently: Chad L. Peace
- Since: Feb 2025

The Superior Court of California, County of San Mateo is the California superior court with jurisdiction over San Mateo County.

== History ==
San Mateo County was created by exclusion from the City and County of San Francisco when it was incorporated in 1856; San Mateo County was re-established by an act passed on April 18, 1857, which also made Redwood City the county seat and included provisions for the first County Court, with sessions to be held in March, June, and November of each year. The first County Judge was the honorable Benjamin I. Fox (1804–69), who served from 1856 to 1860; court was held in a storehouse on Redwood Creek, rented from J.V. Diller for $40/month.

The original two-storey County courthouse ('Grist Mill') was completed in February 1858 on land donated to the County by Simon Mezes. Mezes also donated land that was used for local parks (California Square, which is now the site of the Hall of Justice and Records, and Mezes Park). The 'Grist Mill' courthouse was designed with a jail in the basement, courtroom and government offices on the first floor, and a community hall on the second floor.

The top floor was destroyed in the October 1868 Hayward earthquake, and a second courthouse ('Justice') was built in 1882, using the remaining ground floor as an annex. That year, George H. Buck was elected as the San Mateo County District Attorney; he won election as the County Judge in 1890 and served as the sole judge in the county until 1932, presiding over 20,000 cases, including the famous Flood Estate Case (1931).

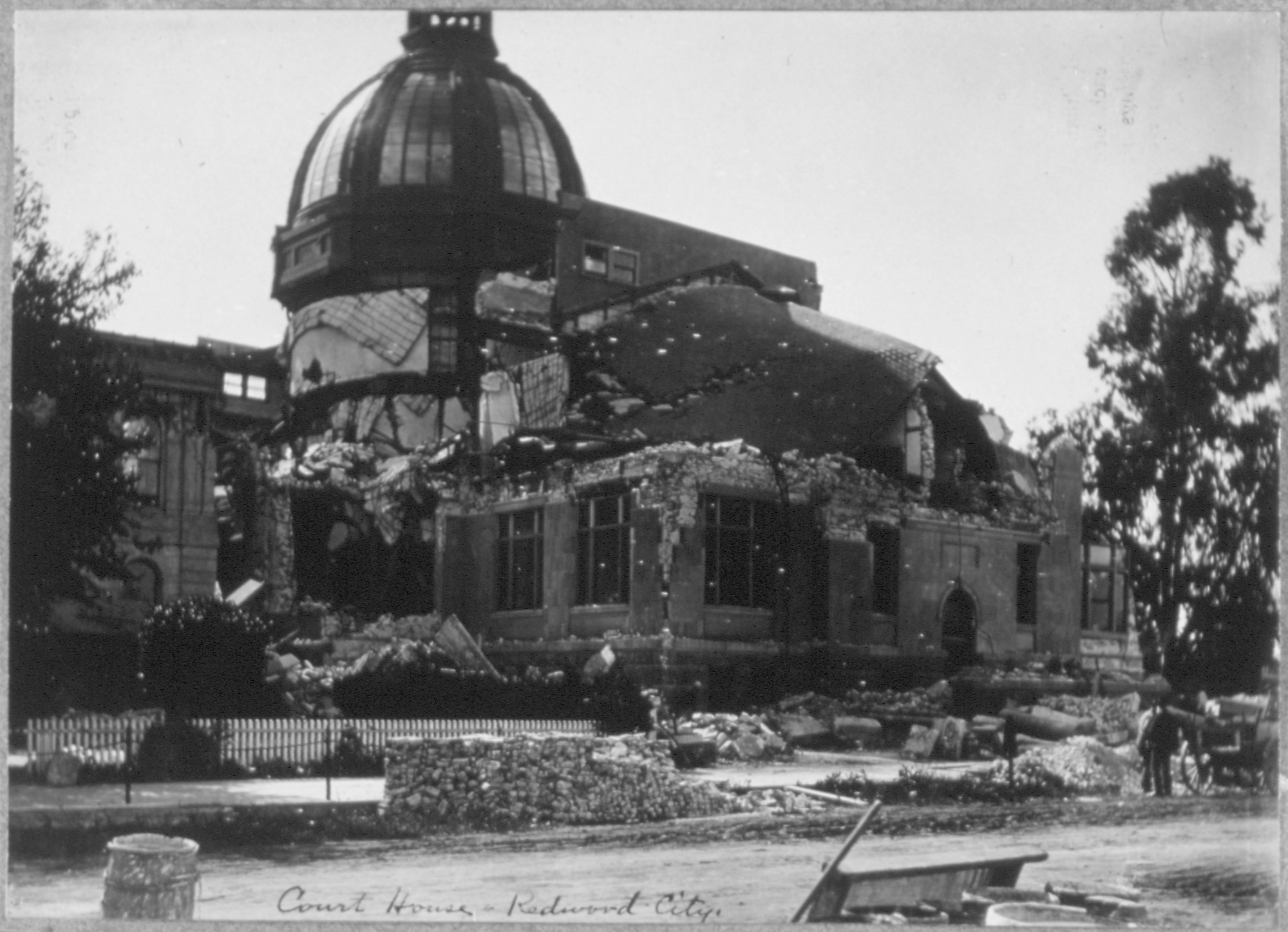
Third courthouse, after it was partially destroyed by the 1906 San Francisco earthquake

A contract for the third courthouse was awarded in 1903, to be built according to plans by Dodge & Dolliver; the cornerstone was laid in May 1904 and it was completed behind the existing 1882/1858 courthouse in 1906, but both were destroyed shortly thereafter in the April 1906 San Francisco earthquake. The 1882 courthouse had been sold for $205 just two weeks before the earthquake.

A fourth county courthouse ('Temple of Justice') was built around the surviving dome of the third and completed in 1910. During the demolition of the ruins of the third courthouse, the dome itself was found to have caused some of the destruction: because it was inadequately secured to its foundation, the iron supporting structure had swayed like a pendulum. The 1910 courthouse was accepted by the county board of supervisors on May 4; the cost was US$220,327 (equivalent to $7,435,000 in 2024) and the architect, Glenn Allen, was awarded 5 per cent of that sum for supervising the construction. A scandal had erupted in 1909 over partial payments made to the contractor before the physical construction was completed, on Allen's recommendation as overseer; although those charges were proven untrue, Allen was later accused of bribery in connection with bidding for the landscape improvements around the new courthouse.

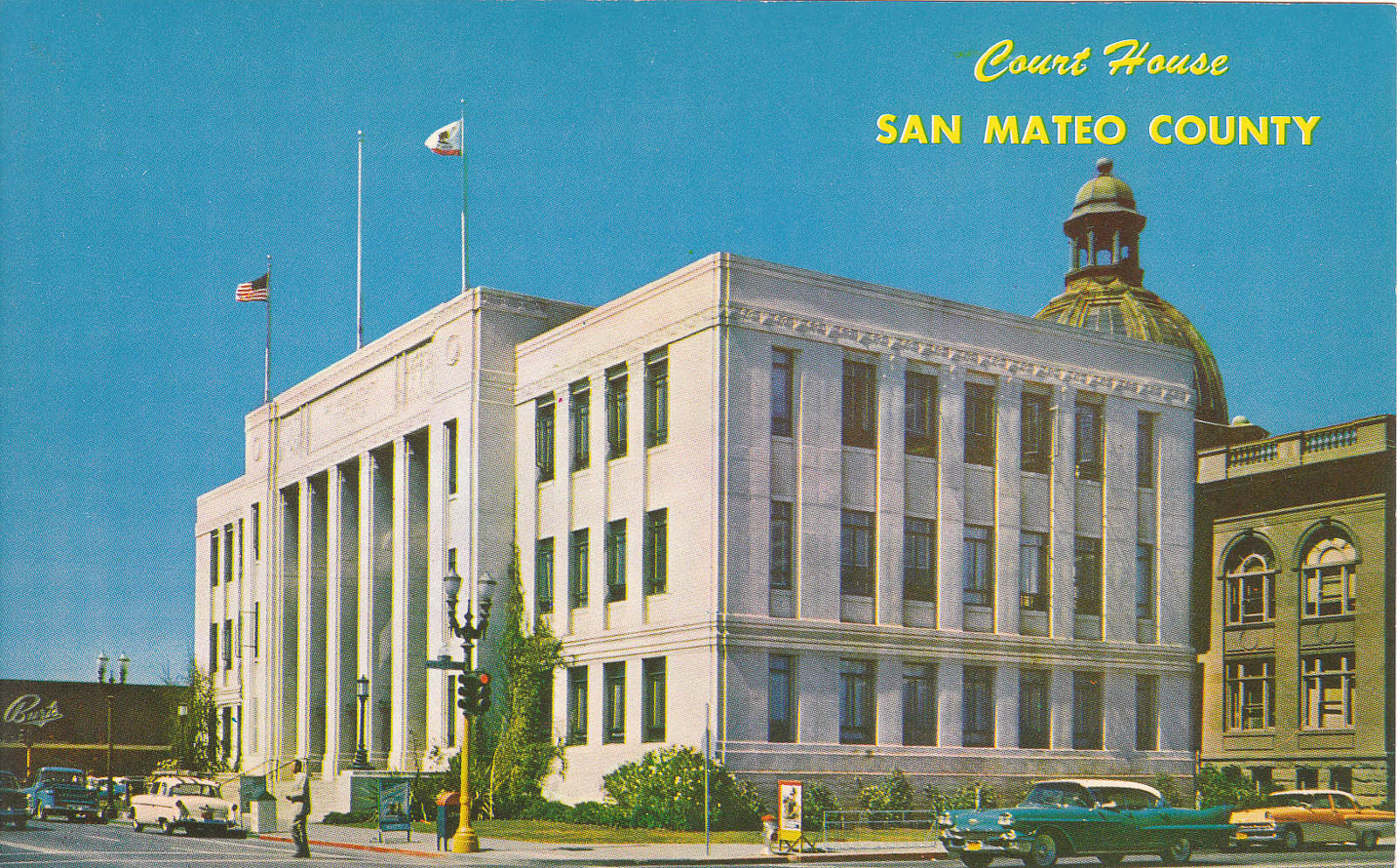
Postcard showing 1939 addition obscuring 1910 courthouse

The 1910 courthouse also served as the seat of the County government; in 1939, the Public Works Administration completed an expansion to the existing courthouse, which removed the original facade; another contemporary addition which was completed in 1941 surrounded the original building with modern structures. The Hall of Justice and Records (HJR) was completed in 1956 for the County government and a tower was added to the Hall of Justice and Records in 1971. The original (1956) design is credited to UC Berkeley architecture professor Michael Goodman. Court operations moved to the HJR upon its completion, but some functions were returned to the 1910 courthouse in early 1964.

The courts did not move back to the HJR completely until the 1990s, after the 1989 Loma Prieta earthquake damaged the historic 1910 courthouse. The 1910 courthouse survived the 1989 earthquake and currently houses the San Mateo County History Museum; it was acquired by the San Mateo County Historical Association in 1997.

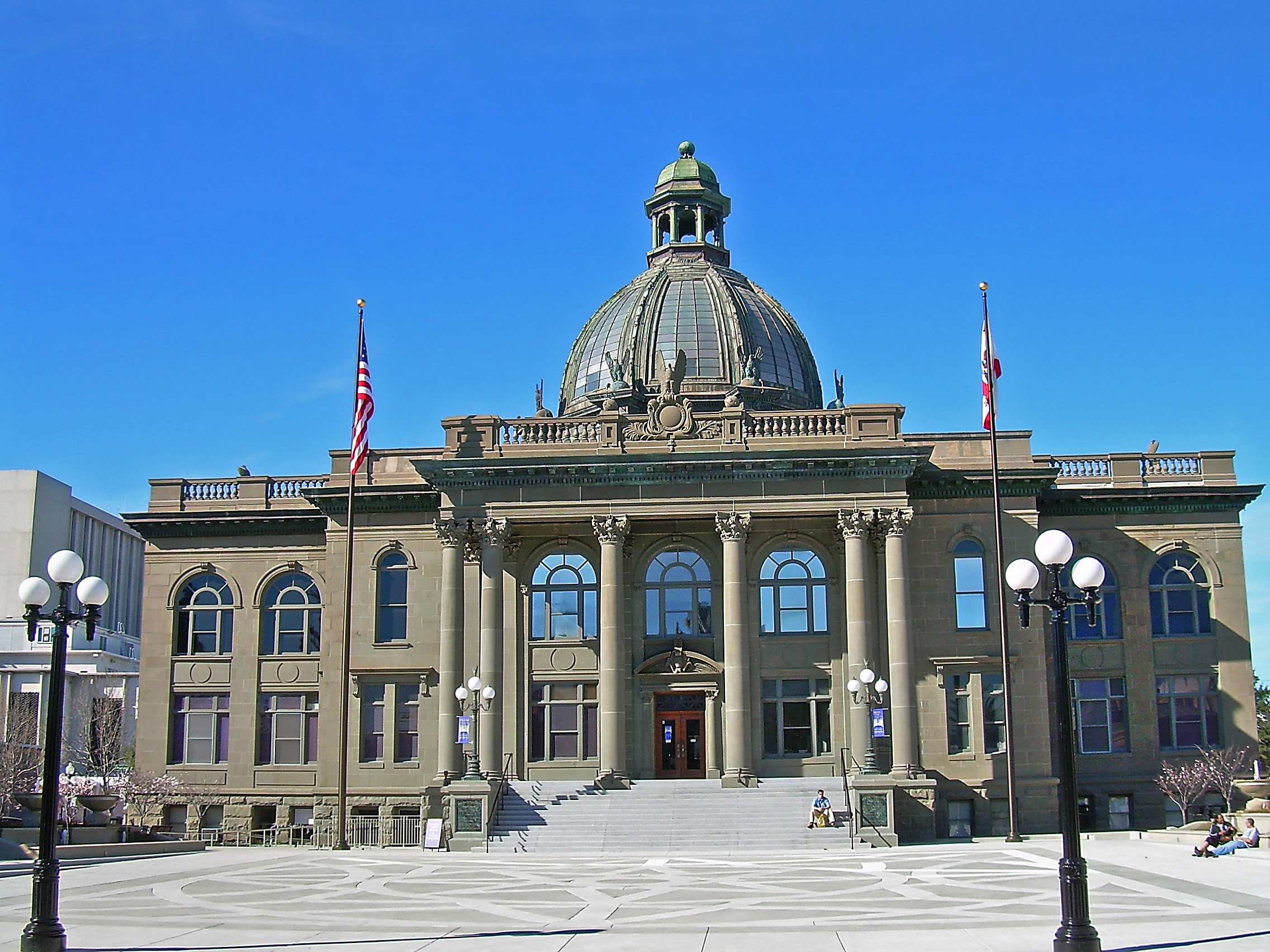
1910 courthouse, as reconstructed after 2006

A civil grand jury recommended in 1999 the HJR structure be retrofitted and that hazardous original construction materials (asbestos and lead paint) be removed. The annex obscuring the front of the 1910 courthouse was torn down in 2005 and the original facade was restored. Courtroom A in the 1910 courthouse is still used for ceremonial purposes.

Due to the COVID-19 pandemic, jury selection proceedings were temporarily moved in September 2020 to the San Mateo County Event Center in the city of San Mateo to allow for social distancing.

== Locations ==
San Mateo County Superior Court locations:
1 Southern Branch, 400 County Center (Redwood City)
2 Northern Branch, 1050 Mission Rd (South San Francisco)
3 Juvenile Branch, 222 Paul Scannell Dr (San Mateo)
4 Central Branch, 800 N Humboldt (San Mateo, closed)

The Court is divided into three branches in three cities, with each branch housed in a separate courthouse:

- Southern Branch: Redwood City
- Northern Branch: South San Francisco
- Juvenile Branch: San Mateo

Cases are divided geographically between the Northern and Southern districts, or by age (Juvenile). The Northern District has jurisdiction over matters from the county line south to (and including) Burlingame.

Previously, the court was housed in five locations; in addition to the three listed above, the court included the Central Branch (located in the city of San Mateo) and the Southern Branch Annex (one block away from the Southern Branch). The Central Branch was closed in 2013 due to budget cuts, and the Annex, which was the countywide Traffic Court, was given to the County in 2019 and demolished to clear space for County Office Building #3 (COB3). The County will move some employees from the Hall of Justice to COB3 after its completion; the space vacated after the move to COB3 will be used for Traffic Court. Meanwhile, Traffic Court operations moved temporarily to the Northern Branch.

== Structure ==
Judicial affairs are governed by the Presiding Judge, with authority delegated to an Assisting Presiding Judge if needed. The Presiding and Assistant Presiding Judges are elected to serve two-year terms by their peers.

Non-judicial administration is performed by the Court Executive Officer, who also serves as the Jury Commissioner.

== In media ==
- Maude rescues a potted plant on the sidewalk of the Hall of Justice and Records in the film Harold and Maude.
- The trial scenes from the film Mrs. Doubtfire were filmed in Courtroom A.
