= Fresno County Superior Court =

California superior court with jurisdiction over Fresno Country

Superior Court of California, County of Fresno
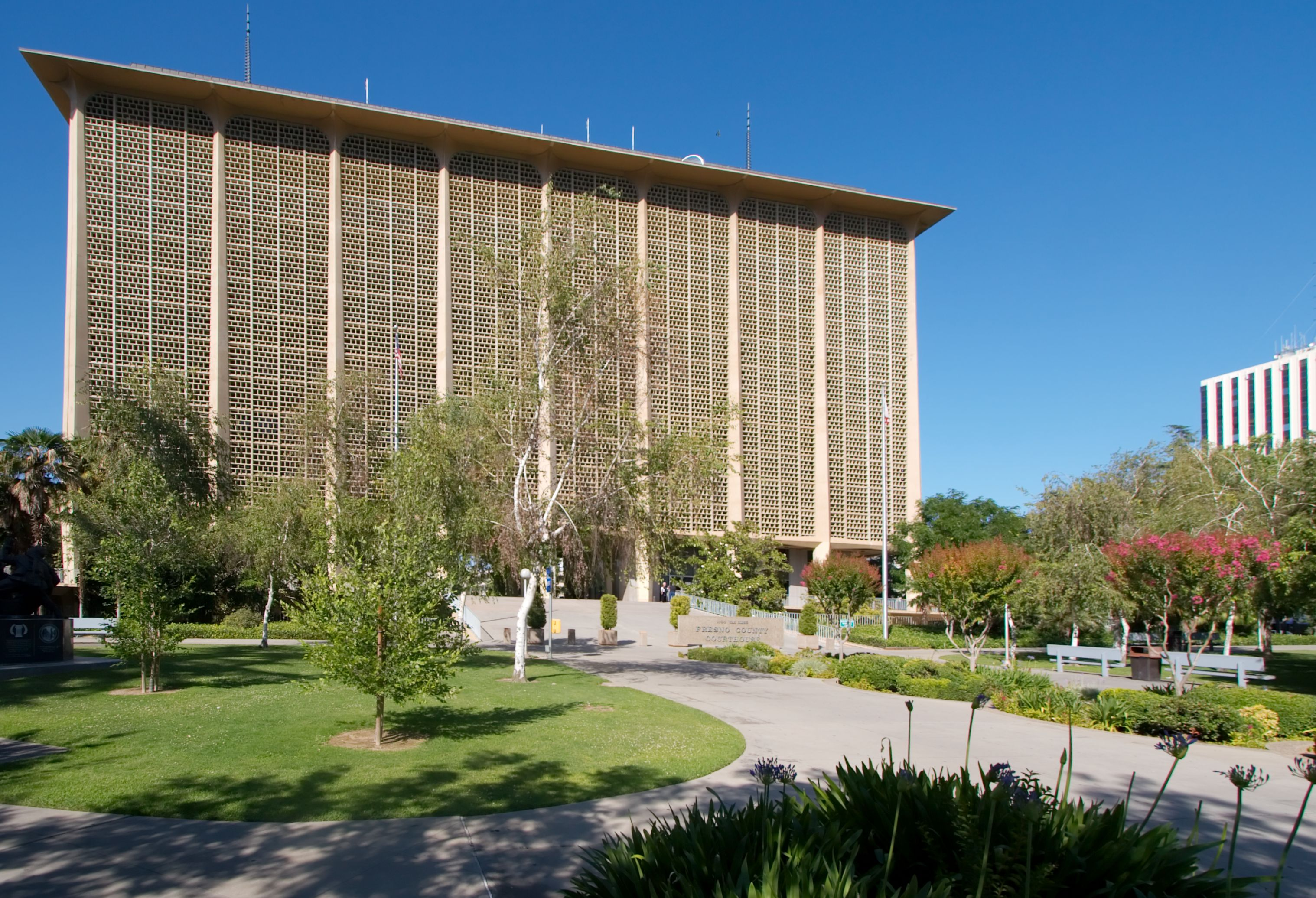
- Fresno County Courthouse in downtown Fresno, California (2007)
- Interactive map of Superior Court of California, County of Fresno
- 38.677°N 121.768°W
- Established: 1856
- Jurisdiction: Fresno County, California
- Location: Fresno
- Coordinates: 38.677°N 121.768°W
- Appeals to: California Court of Appeal for the Fifth District
- Website: fresno.courts.ca.gov

Presiding Judge
- Currently: Hon. Houry A. Sanderson

Assistant Presiding Judge
- Currently: Hon. Jeff Hamilton

Court Executive Officer
- Currently: Dawn Annino
- Since: Nov 5, 2022

The Superior Court of California, County of Fresno, informally the Fresno County Superior Court, is the California superior court with jurisdiction over Fresno County.

== History ==
Fresno County was formed in 1856 from neighboring Mariposa, Merced, and Tulare counties. The mining village of Millertown [sic] was named as the first county seat. The Central Pacific Railroad located its stop at what would become Fresno in May 1872, and the county seat was moved there by popular vote in February 1874.

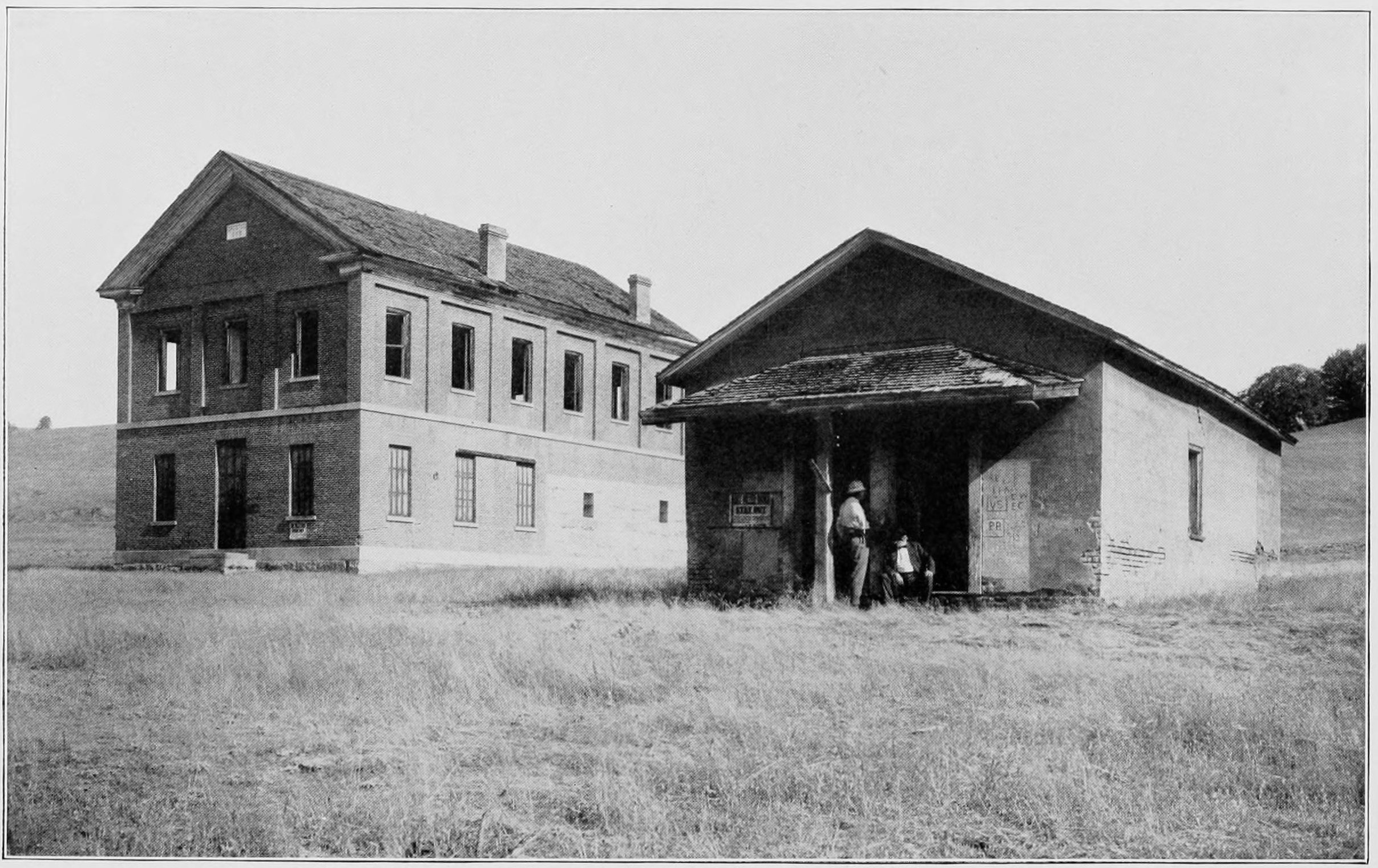
Abandoned 1867 Millerton courthouse

While the county seat was in Millerton, discussions began in June 1859 to build a permanent courthouse, sessions being held in up to four different buildings on one-year leases until then, but the county lacked the means to raise funds due to the sparse population until 1866, when a bond issue of US$20,000 (equivalent to $430,000 in 2024) was authorized and the building contract for the new courthouse and jail was awarded to Charles P. Converse, who finished the brick and granite building in summer 1867. The 1867 courthouse was described in 1919 as "most substantially constructed ... a mute object lesson to present-day contractors of shoddy and ginger breaded public work". With the removal of the county seat, the entire town of Millerton was abandoned, including the seven-year-old courthouse, which was "left standing by itself, a refuge for owls and bats, and the drunken orgies of the 'noble redman'". When the Friant Dam was completed on the San Joaquin River, forming Millerton Lake and inundating the ghost town, the 1867 courthouse was disassembled and moved to a bluff overlooking the lake.

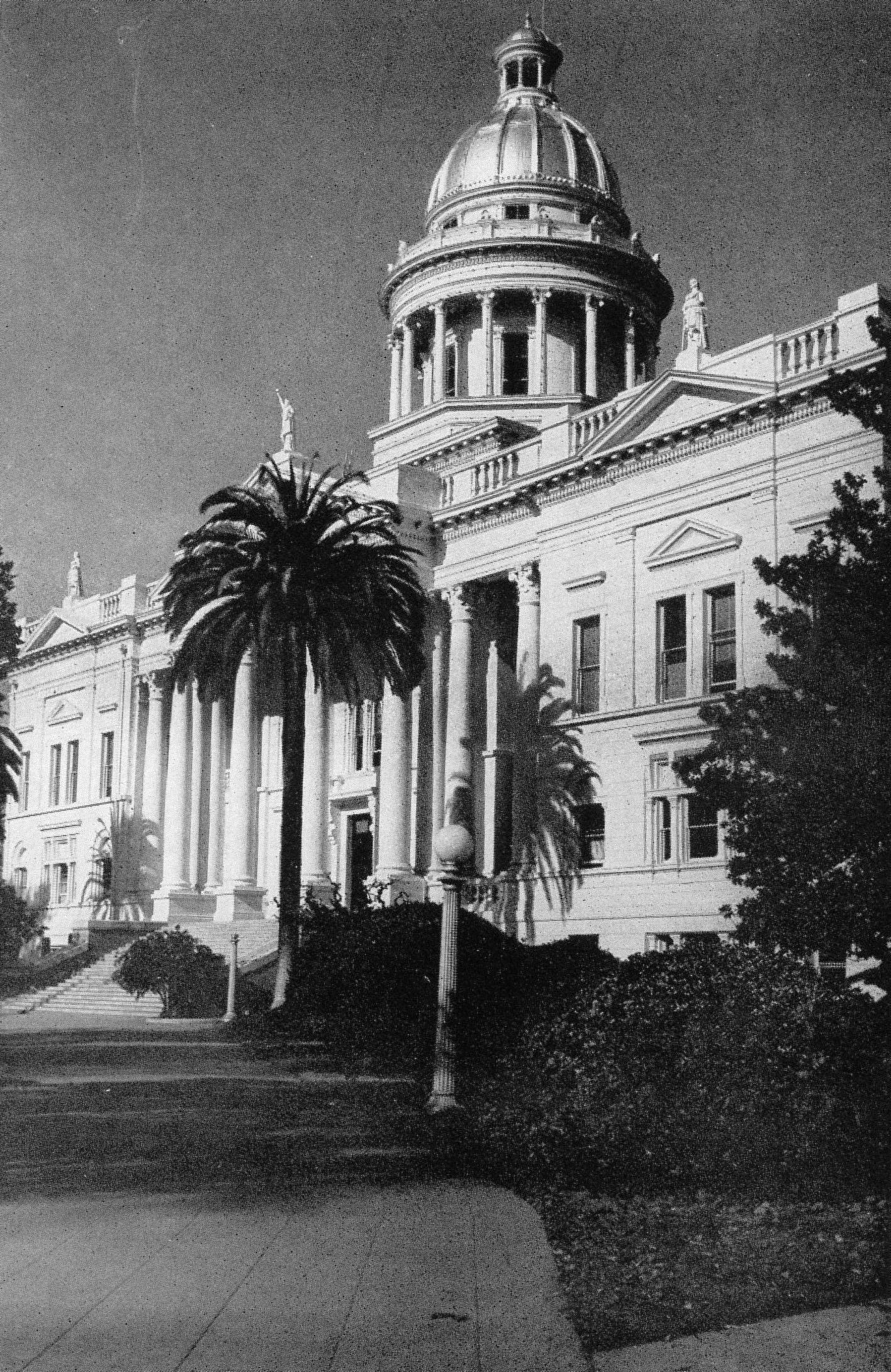
1875 courthouse in Fresno

After the county seat was moved to Fresno, the cornerstone for a new courthouse there was laid on October 8, 1874, and the building was accepted on August 19, 1875. The 1875 courthouse was designed by state architect Albert A. Bennett. It was subsequently enlarged in 1893, adding a large copper dome and two new wings. In 1895, after a fire that destroyed the copper dome and gutted the central building, the courthouse was rebuilt. However, a structural survey in 1961 concluded the 1875 courthouse had significant structural defects, and it was torn down in 1966 after a new courthouse was built.

The 1966 courthouse was designed by Wagner & Associates. It is eight stories tall and features decorative grill work over the fascia. Fresno County consolidated municipal and county courts into the Superior Court of Fresno County on July 1, 1998.

The B. F. Sisk Courthouse was originally completed in 1967 as the federal courthouse for the United States District Court for the Eastern District of California, and was vacated in 2006 when the Robert E. Coyle United States Courthouse was completed. The building title was conveyed to the State of California for the nominal sum of US$1 in 2007. It was rededicated on October 4, 2010, for the Fresno Superior Court, which uses the site for civil and family proceedings.

The "M" Street Civil Courthouse is housed in a former banquet hall; operations at "M" Street began in March 2008. The Juvenile Delinquency Court was opened in July 2009.

== Venues ==
Fresno County Superior Court locations:
1 Downtown, 1100 Van Ness Ave
2 B. F. Sisk, 1130 O St
3 M Street, 2317 Tuolumne St
4 Archives, 1963 E St
5 Departments 95 & 96, 1265 M St
6 Juvenile Delinquency, 3333 E American Ave, Ste A

All court locations are in the county seat of Fresno. Criminal cases are held at the downtown courthouse location, while the B. F. Sisk location handles civil and family law cases, and the M Street courthouse handles traffic cases. There is a separate juvenile court location, located southeast of the main downtown county court campus.
