= Imperial County Superior Court =

Superior Court of California, County of Imperial
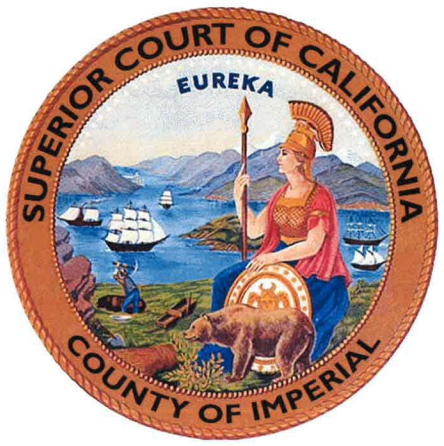
- Seal of the Court

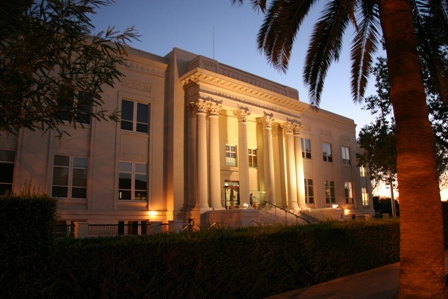
- Imperial County Courthouse, El Centro
- Jurisdiction: California; Imperial County, California
- Composition method: Non-partisan election
- Authorised by: Constitution of California
- Appeals to: California Court of Appeal; 4th Appellate District; Division 1
- Judge term length: Six years
- Number of positions: 10 judges, by statute
- Website: imperial.courts.ca.gov

Presiding Judge
- Currently: Monica Lepe-Negrete
- Since: 2026

Court Executive Officer
- Currently: Maria Rhinehart

The Superior Court of California, County of Imperial, informally the Imperial County Superior Court, is the California superior court with jurisdiction over Imperial County.

The superior court operates three courthouses throughout the county. As of 2026, the presiding judge of the court is the Hon. Monica Lepe-Negrete, and the court executive officer is Maria Rhinehart. The court has over 100 employees, 10 judges, and 2 subordinate judicial officers. The building is 20 feet tall and about 100 feet wide. It has a budget of approximately $14.5 million, for the 2025-2026 fiscal year.https://www.imperial.courts.ca.gov/system/files/general/budget-25-26-summary.pdf

== History and courthouses ==
Imperial County Superior Court locations:
1 939 W Main St (El Centro)
2 2124 Winterhaven Dr (Winterhaven)
3 220 Main St (Brawley)

The original Imperial County courthouse was built in 1908 in the City of El Centro. The current Imperial County courthouse was subsequently built upon a "five acre tract" of donated land in the City of El Centro on West Main St. The courthouse was completed in 1924 and designed by architects Ralph Emerson Swearingen and Don W. Wells. The original courthouse is currently still in use nearly ninety-five years later.

The courthouse was substantially damaged during a 2010 earthquake which affected much of Imperial County.

The California Judicial Council approved funding for a modernized criminal courthouse which was completed in December of 2023. The new 46,000 plus square foot courthouse improved operational efficiency and access to justice through consolidated criminal court calendars and operations in a modern facility. The historic "Main Street" courthouse continues to operate, and adjudicates civil, probate, juvenile dependency, juvenile justice, traffic and small claims, and family law matters. https://courts.ca.gov/facilities/imperial-county-new-el-centro-courthouse

== Judicial officers ==
The current judicial officers of the Imperial County Superior Court are the Hon. Monica Lepe-Negrete (Presiding Judge), Hon. Michael Domenzain (Assistant Presiding Judge & Juvenile and Family Law Presiding Judge), Hon. Brooks Anderholt, Hon. Jeffrey Jones (Civil Presiding Judge), Hon. William Lehman, Hon. Poli Flores, Hon. Eran Bermudez, Hon. Marco Nunez, Hon. Christopher Plourd, Hon. William Quan, and Hon. Martin Gonzalez (Referee).

== See also ==
- Superior Courts of California
