= Same-sex marriage in Puerto Rico =

Same-sex marriage has been legal in Puerto Rico since July 13, 2015, as a result of the U.S. Supreme Court's decision in Obergefell v. Hodges. On June 26, 2015, the Supreme Court ruled that bans on same-sex marriage are unconstitutional under the Due Process and Equal Protection clauses of the U.S. Constitution. Governor Alejandro García Padilla announced that the commonwealth would comply with the Supreme Court's ruling within 15 days. Same-sex couples began applying for marriage licenses on July 13, and the first marriages occurred on July 17, 2015. The Civil Code was amended in 2020 to incorporate the Obergefell ruling and codify same-sex marriage into law.

Following the Supreme Court ruling, the parties to the principal lawsuit challenging Puerto Rico's denial of marriage rights to same-sex couples, Conde-Vidal v. Garcia-Padilla, jointly asked the First Circuit Court of Appeals to overturn the ruling of the U.S. District Court for the District of Puerto Rico that had upheld Puerto Rico's ban on same-sex marriage, which the appeals court did on July 8, 2015.

== Legal history ==
=== Background ===
In August 1997, the Senate of Puerto Rico began discussions on adding an explicit amendment banning same-sex marriage to the Civil Code, even though the law already defined marriage as a "union between a man and a woman". The proposal was promoted by religious groups, but rejected by LGBT activists who argued that the move served only to "stigmatize" same-sex couples as the Civil Code already defined marriage in heterosexual terms. The amendment generated significant media coverage and societal debate. Consequently, Representative Alba Rivera introduced a bill to legalize domestic partnerships in November 1997, although the bill was never brought up for debate in the chamber floor. The amendment banning same-sex marriage was amended and approved in the House of Representatives and sent back to the Senate for a concurrent vote, which provided approval a few months later. On March 19, 1999, Governor Pedro Rosselló signed it into law. Article 68 of the Civil Code was amended to explicitly prohibit marriages "between persons of the same sex or transsexuals contracted in other jurisdictions" from being recognized in Puerto Rico. These provisions were officially repealed in 2020.

During a debate on civil unions in 2007, Secretary of Justice Roberto Sánchez Ramos said it might be unconstitutional to deny marriage rights to same-sex couples. In 2008, the Senate of Puerto Rico passed a motion to organize a referendum that would have asked voters to amend the Puerto Rico Constitution to define marriage as a "union between a man and a woman", while also banning same-sex marriages, civil unions and domestic partnership benefits. Known as resolution 99 (resolución 99), the proposed referendum was not approved by the House of Representatives, after the legislative committee studying the proposal decided not to recommend its approval. A similar bill was defeated in 2009. In early January 2010, Governor Luis Fortuño suggested to a group of evangelical ministers that he favored amending the Puerto Rico Constitution to restrict marriage to "the union of one man and one woman". Shortly afterwards, he categorically denied that he favored such a measure.

=== Federal lawsuit ===
Recognition of same-sex unions in the Lesser Antilles and Puerto Rico Same-sex marriage Unregistered cohabitation Island subject to IACHR advisory opinion No recognition of same-sex couples Constitutional ban on same-sex marriage Same-sex sexual activity illegal but penalties not enforced

On March 25, 2014, two women residing in Puerto Rico, represented by Lambda Legal, filed a complaint in the U.S. District Court for the District of Puerto Rico seeking recognition of their 2004 marriage in Massachusetts. They initially named as defendants in their suit, Conde-Vidal v. Rius-Amendariz, the Secretary of Health, Ana Ríus Armendáriz, later adding Governor Alejandro García Padilla and the treasury director, retitling the case to Conde-Vidal v. Garcia-Padilla. The plaintiffs argued that Puerto Rico's marriage law denied them constitutional rights guaranteed under the Due Process and Equal Protection clauses of the U.S. Constitution. Four more couples joined as plaintiffs in June. On August 28, Christian Chaplains (Capellanes Internacionales Cristianos León de Judá) asked to be allowed to intervene in the suit on behalf of its eight members who reside in Puerto Rico. They claimed that if the court ruled for the plaintiffs they "[would] be obligated by law to marry same-sex couples." On October 17, Judge Juan Pérez-Giménez denied the group's request. Pérez-Giménez dismissed the plaintiffs' lawsuit on October 21, 2014, ruling that the U.S. Supreme Court's ruling in the 1972 case of Baker v. Nelson prevented him from considering their arguments. He concluded that Puerto Rico's definition of marriage did not conflict with the U.S. Constitution and that:

Puerto Rico, acting through its legislature, remains free to shape its own marriage policy. In a system of limited constitutional self-government such as ours, this is the prudent outcome. The people and their elected representatives should debate the wisdom of redefining marriage. Judges should not...traditional marriage is the fundamental unit of the political order. And ultimately the very survival of the political order depends upon the procreative potential embodied in traditional marriage.

The plaintiffs appealed the decision to the First Circuit Court of Appeals. On March 20, 2015, Secretary of Justice César Miranda announced that the commonwealth would tell the First Circuit that it had decided that Puerto Rico's statute banning the licensing and recognition of same-sex marriage was legally indefensible. Governor García Padilla said that "legal developments in a number of American jurisdictions point to an undeniable consensus" against the discrimination found in Puerto Rico's statutes with respect to the right of same-sex couples to marry. Puerto Rico's brief said that Baker v. Nelson was no longer controlling, that "Puerto Rico's marriage ban must be examined through heightened scrutiny", and that "the Commonwealth cannot responsibly advance ... any interest sufficiently important or compelling to justify the differentiated treatment afforded to same-sex couples". It asked the First Circuit to reverse the judgment of the District Court. On April 14, 2015, the First Circuit suspended proceedings until after a ruling from the U.S. Supreme Court on marriage cases it was considering on appeal from the Sixth Circuit Court of Appeals. The court asked the parties to file a proposed schedule for further proceedings in Conde-Vidal within 14 days of the Supreme Court's decision. The Supreme Court ruled in Obergefell v. Hodges on June 26, 2015 that the Fourteenth Amendment guarantees same-sex couples the right to marry. That same day, all parties to Conde-Vidal asked the First Circuit to overrule the District Court's decision as soon as possible. Governor García Padilla said he would issue an executive order requiring all government agencies to implement the Obergefell ruling within 15 days. The first same-sex couples began applying for marriage licenses on July 13, 2015, and the first marriages took place on July 17. Among the first couples to marry were Yolanda Arroyo Pizarro and Zulma Oliveras Vega, plaintiffs in Conde-Vidal, who married in Santurce, San Juan on July 17. A group of lawmakers from the New Progressive Party filed a last-ditch attempt to block the recognition of same-sex marriages, but the Puerto Rico Supreme Court dismissed the measure on July 16, ruling that "Puerto Rico cannot refuse to recognize marriages between people of the same sex. This is the current law."

The First Circuit ruled in the case on July 8, 2015, overturning the territory's statutory ban on same-sex marriage and remanding the case back to the District Court. On March 8, 2016, Judge Pérez-Giménez ruled that the U.S. Supreme Court's ruling in Obergefell did not apply to Puerto Rico, and so upheld the ban on same-sex marriage, in conflict with the First Circuit's directions. In response, Governor García Padilla said he would respect the rulings of the superior courts, ensuring same-sex marriages continue in Puerto Rico. An appeal of Judge Pérez-Giménez's ruling was promptly lodged with the First Circuit, which on April 8, 2016 issued an unsigned opinion rejecting the lower court's ruling and granted the request from the parties challenging the ban that the appeals court issue an order "requiring the district court to enter judgment in their favor striking down the ban as unconstitutional." The First Circuit also ordered that the case "be assigned randomly by the clerk to a different judge (of the lower court) to enter judgment in favor of the Petitioners promptly." On April 11, 2016, District Court Judge Gustavo Gelpí issued a declaratory judgement striking down Puerto Rico's same-sex marriage ban as unconstitutional and declaring that any marriage of a same-sex couple performed in the territory since the U.S. Supreme Court's decision in Obergefell be fully recognized by government agencies and officials.

=== Developments after legalization ===
On June 1, 2020, Governor Wanda Vázquez Garced signed into law a new civil code that repealed article 68 and removed provisions banning same-sex marriage. The new code uses gender-neutral language with regard to married spouses, and ensures recognition of same-sex unions entered into in other jurisdictions. It was approved by the House of Representatives on March 4, 2019 by a 32–15 vote. However, on April 11, the House requested that the Senate defer consideration of the bill. It approved a modified version of the legislation on November 4. The Senate later passed a slightly modified version, which caused the Legislative Assembly to agree on a unified version of the bill on May 14, 2020. The code went into effect on November 28, 2020. Article 376 of the new code reads: Marriage is a civil institution, originating in a civil contract whereby two natural persons mutually agree to become spouses and to discharge toward each other the duties imposed by law. (Note: Spanish: El matrimonio es una institución civil que procede de un contrato civil en virtud del cual dos personas naturales se obligan mutuamente a ser cónyuges, y a cumplir la una para con la otra los deberes que la ley les impone.)

== Native American nations ==
While there are no records of same-sex marriages being performed in Native Americans cultures in the way they are commonly defined in Western legal systems, many Indigenous communities recognize identities and relationships that may be placed on the LGBT spectrum. Among these are two-spirit individuals—people who embody both masculine and feminine qualities. In some cultures, two-spirit individuals assigned male at birth wear women's clothing and engage in household and artistic work associated with the feminine sphere. Historically, this identity sometimes allowed for unions between two people of the same biological sex. Literature about two-spirit individuals among the Taíno is limited. It is possible that Taíno society did have a designation like two-spirit, but a lot of traditional knowledge was lost during colonization. "Pre-contact Taíno culture was not particularly well documented by the Spanish, and its lack of a written record of its own means that, when Spain severed institutional continuity in Taíno society, it was able to cut [it] off from a large chunk of [its] own past." Some historians argue that there were male-bodied individuals who were identified by the fact that they wore naguas, a small cotton apron usually reserved for married women. The term used for these people is eierí-iʼnaruʼ, and it is possible that they occupied a traditional third gender role in the community. Some Taíno revivalist groups have adopted the two-spirit concept, while others continue to acknowledge the Catholic mores that now dominate Puerto Rico.

== Demographics and marriage statistics ==
Data from the 2010 U.S. census showed that 6,614 same-sex couples were living in Puerto Rico. Same-sex partners were on average younger than opposite-sex partners (at 39.5 years of age to 53.3 years), and slightly less likely to be Latino (at 97% to 99%). 15% of same-sex couples in Puerto Rico were raising children under the age of 18, with an estimated 1,269 children living in households headed by same-sex couples.

According to the Puerto Rico Department of Health, 261 same-sex couples had married by the end of December 2015, of which 96 (36.8%) were male couples and 165 (63.2%) were lesbian couples. 637 same-sex marriages were performed in 2016: 271 (42.5%) between male couples and 366 (57.5%) between lesbian couples. In total, same-sex marriages represented 1.5% and 4.0% of all marriages performed those two years. Compared to heterosexual unions, partners in same-sex marriages were older when getting married, especially in 2015, when an estimated 20-30% of same-sex marriages involved partners over the age of 55 (compared to about 10% for heterosexual couples). By 2020, 2,118 same-sex marriages had been performed in Puerto Rico, with 275 marriages conducted in 2017, 426 in 2018, 291 in 2019, and 228 in 2020.

The 2020 U.S. census showed that there were 3,053 married same-sex couple households (1,379 male couples and 1,674 female couples) and 6,247 unmarried same-sex couple households in Puerto Rico.

== Public opinion ==
According to a Pew Research Center survey conducted between November 7, 2013 and February 28, 2014, 33% of Puerto Ricans supported same-sex marriage, while 55% were opposed.

== See also ==
- LGBTQ rights in Puerto Rico
- Pedro Julio Serrano
- Same-sex marriage in the United States
- Recognition of same-sex unions in the Americas
