= Aida Delgado-Colón =

Puerto Rican judge (born 1955)

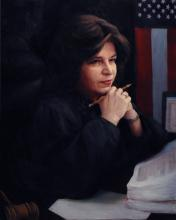

Chief Judge of the United States District Court for the District of Puerto Rico
- In office 2011 – April 13, 2018
- Preceded by: José A. Fusté
- Succeeded by: Gustavo Gelpí

Judge of the United States District Court for the District of Puerto Rico
- Incumbent
- Assumed office March 17, 2006
- Appointed by: George W. Bush
- Preceded by: Salvador E. Casellas

Magistrate Judge of the United States District Court for the District of Puerto Rico
- In office 1993–2006

Personal details
- Born: 1955 (age 70–71) Lares, Puerto Rico
- Education: University of Puerto Rico (BA); Pontifical Catholic University of Puerto Rico School of Law (JD)

Aida Milagros Delgado-Colón (born 1955) is a United States district judge for the District of Puerto Rico.

== Education and career ==
Delgado-Colón was born in Lares, Puerto Rico. She received a Bachelor of Arts degree from the University of Puerto Rico in 1977 and a Juris Doctor from the Pontifical Catholic University of Puerto Rico School of Law in 1980. She worked in the Department of Labor and Human Resources of the Commonwealth of Puerto Rico from 1980 to 1981 and then held various positions in the Office of the Public Defender of the U.S. District Court for the District of Puerto Rico from 1982 to 1993. Delgado-Colón was an adjunct professor, Pontifical Catholic University of Puerto Rico School of Law from 2003 to 2004.

=== Federal judicial service ===
Delgado-Colón is a United States district judge of the United States District Court for the District of Puerto Rico. She was nominated by President George W. Bush on October 25, 2005, to a seat vacated by Judge Salvador E. Casellas who assumed senior status on June 10, 2005. She was confirmed by the Senate on March 6, 2006, and received her commission on March 17, 2006. She served as chief judge from 2011 to 2018.

She is only the second female on the bench in the District of Puerto Rico, after District Judge and former Chief Judge Carmen Consuelo Cerezo, who has served for nearly three decades. In 2011, she also became the second female Chief Judge in the District of Puerto Rico, succeeding Judge José A. Fusté, she served in that capacity until April 13, 2018, being succeeded by Gustavo Gelpí.

== See also ==
- List of Hispanic and Latino American jurists
- List of Puerto Ricans

Legal offices
Preceded by Salvador E. Casellas	Judge of the United States District Court for the District of Puerto Rico; 2006–present	Incumbent
Preceded by José A. Fusté	Chief Judge of the United States District Court for the District of Puerto Rico; 2011–2018	Succeeded by Gustavo Gelpí
