= Benny Frankie Cerezo =

Member of the Puerto Rico House of Representatives

Member of the Puerto Rico House of Representatives from the 5th District
- In office January 2, 1969 – January 1, 1973
- Preceded by: Herminio Concepción de Gracia
- Succeeded by: Ramón Ramos Vaello

Personal details
- Born: September 27, 1943 Aguadilla, Puerto Rico
- Died: April 15, 2013 (aged 69) Cleveland, Ohio
- Spouse: Carmen Consuelo Vargas
- Education: University of Puerto Rico (B.A.); University of Puerto Rico School of Law (J.D.); Harvard University; Complutense University of Madrid (Ph.D.)
- Occupation: Attorney, legislator, politician, political analyst

Benny Frankie Cerezo (September 27, 1943 – April 15, 2013), was a Puerto Rican lawyer, one of the seven founding members of the Puerto Rico New Progressive Party, legislator, and a political analyst. He got his Juris Doctor degree from the University of Puerto Rico (in 1965), pursued constitutional law at Harvard University (summers of 1977 and 1978) and got a PhD in Administrative Constitutional Right from Spain's Universidad Complutense de Madrid (in 2002).

== Political career ==
Cerezo served as a member of the Puerto Rico House of Representatives between 1969 and 1973. Elected in 1968 under the newly founded New Progressive Party at an early age, incoming Speaker Angel Viera Martínez appointed him to chair one of the House's two most powerful committees, the Government Affairs Committee. Cerezo came out against the Vietnam War and ended up losing his chairmanship, ending his elective career.

From 1989 to 1991, Cerezo once again collaborated briefly with the pro-statehood New Progressive Party(NPP) when he accepted party president Carlos Romero Barceló's invitation to spearhead the party's lobbying efforts to get Congress to approve a bill providing for a referendum in Puerto Rico on political status options. Cerezo put together a group of ad hoc volunteer lobbyists, including Romero, legendary party founder Luis A. Ferré, in his late 80's at the time, as well as a younger cadre that included attorney Carlos Díaz Olivo, now a law professor, businessman Cesar Cabrera, subsequently a United States Ambassador, attorney Luis Fortuño, subsequently Governor of Puerto Rico, and Kenneth McClintock, who later became the territory's President of the Senate and Secretary of State. When Pedro Rosselló became party president and Cerezo questioned many of Rossello's policies, Cerezo once again withdrew from collaborating with the NPP.

After leaving the NPP sphera, he went on to have a successful law practice and a career as a non-affiliated political analyst.

== Political analysis ==
Cerezo participated in many political analysis programs from 1969 until his death in 2013. His political analysis style was described very well by Nilsa Pierri Castellón: "Benny was bold in the analysis, risky in his judgments, but vertical and almost always accurate". Cerezo was a harsh critic of the actions he understood wrong, or harmful to the people, regardless of their party or affiliation.

- Together with Noel Colón Martínez, Severo Colberg Ramírez, Juan Manuel García Passalacqua and José Arsenio Torres (former Secretary of Education) he founded "Cara a Cara Ante el País", one of the most successful political analysis programs that lasted 10 years on TV.
- In 1970, he founded "Dialogando con Benny" in WKAQ (AM). This program was broadcast on Sundays from 8:30 to 10:30 a.m. on various radio stations, and ended always being the number one program for that time segment.
- He founded "Voz Primera" with Don Roberto Sánchez Vilella (former governor of Puerto Rico from the Popular Democratic Party of Puerto Rico-PDP), Victoria Muñoz Mendoza (daughter of the first governor of Puerto Rico and the first female candidate for governor in Puerto Rico), Elías Gútierrez, José Luis Méndez y Santos Negrón. The program was aired in commercial radio and the University of Puerto Rico radio station.
- He helped found "Avance", along with several other political mavericks, including Juan Manuel García Passalacqua and Noel Colón Martínez a Puerto Rican newsweekly magazine that attempted to provide a heavy dose of political analysis before folding.

Cerezo was also a regular columnist for El Mundo, El Imparcial and El Nuevo Día newspapers, and an occasional columnist for The San Juan Star.

At the time of his death, he was a political analyst for several radio and TV stations in Puerto Rico, and was in charge of an hour-long political analysis talk show on Radio Isla 1320 WSKN, an island-wide radio network.

== His life ==
He was married to United States District Judge Carmen Consuelo Vargas and was the father of one daughter and one son, a partner in a Miami law firm.

== Death ==
Cerezo died April 15, 2013, in Cleveland, Ohio after being affected by a cardiovascular complication.
