= Raúl M. Arias-Marxuach =

Puerto Rican judge (born 1967)

Raúl Arias-Marxuach
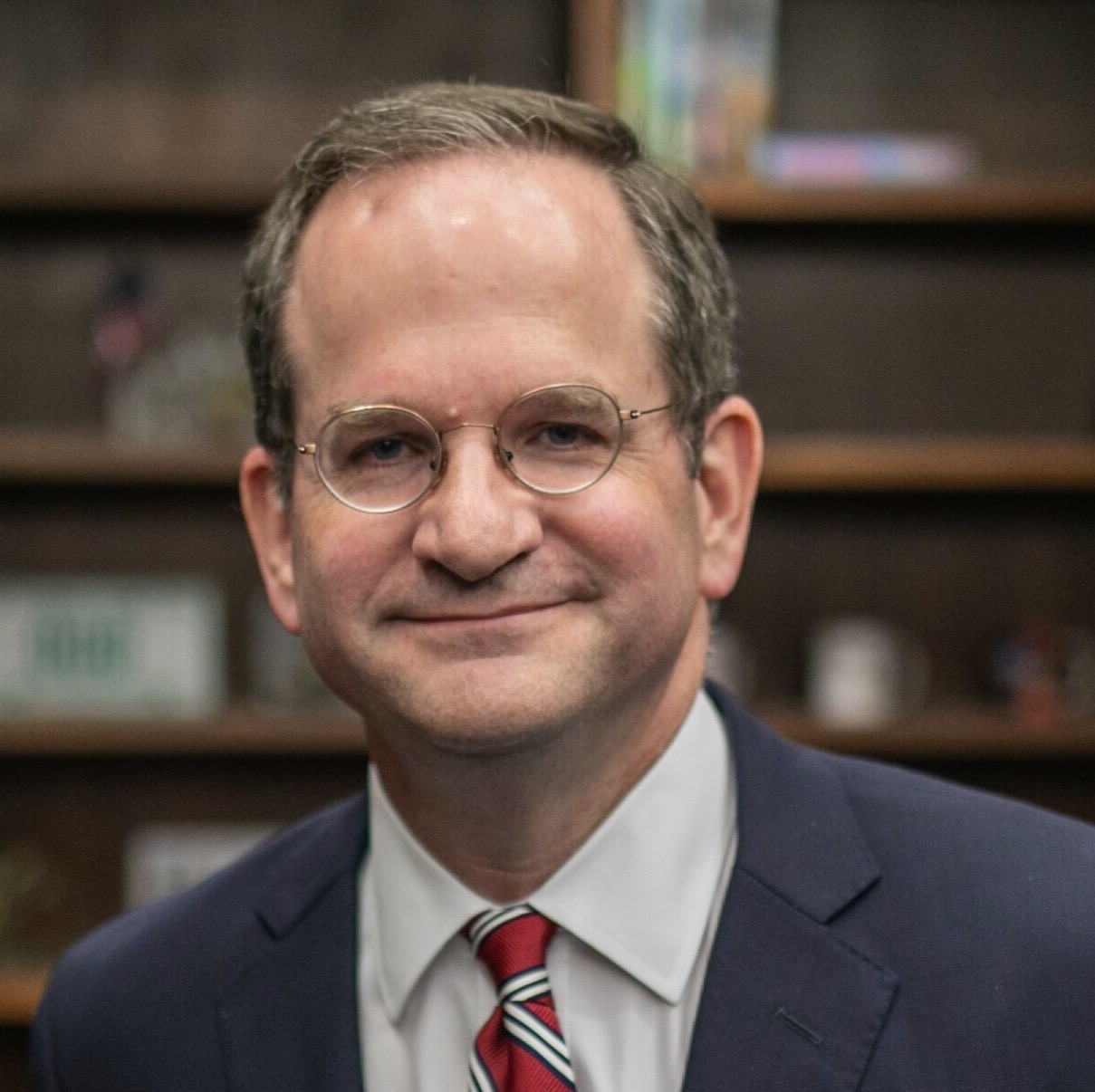

Chief Judge of the United States District Court for the District of Puerto Rico
- Incumbent
- Assumed office October 20, 2021
- Preceded by: Gustavo Gelpí

Judge of the United States District Court for the District of Puerto Rico
- Incumbent
- Assumed office May 13, 2019
- Appointed by: Donald Trump
- Preceded by: José A. Fusté

Personal details
- Born: Raúl Manuel Arias-Marxuach; 1967 (age 58–59) San Juan, Puerto Rico
- Education: Boston College (BA); University of Puerto Rico, Río Piedras (JD); Harvard University (LLM)

Raúl Manuel Arias-Marxuach (born 1967) is the chief United States district judge of the United States District Court for the District of Puerto Rico.

== Education ==
Arias-Marxuach graduated from Colegio San Ignacio de Loyola in San Juan. He received a Bachelor of Arts from Boston College, and a Juris Doctor, magna cum laude, from the University of Puerto Rico School of Law. In addition, he obtained a Master of Laws from Harvard Law School. In 1985 he joined the Alpha chapter of Phi Sigma Alpha fraternity.

== Career ==
After graduating from law school, Arias-Marxuach served as a law clerk to Associate Justice Antonio Negrón García of the Supreme Court of Puerto Rico. After obtaining his Master of Laws, he became an associate at Fiddler Gonzalez & Rodriguez, where he worked until 1995. In 1995, he joined McConnell Valdés, where he maintained a diverse commercial litigation practice that focused on contracts, products liability, personal injury, antitrust and maritime disputes and accumulated substantial jury trial and appellate experience in complex matters. He was a partner and Vice-Chair of the Litigation Practice Group at the firm prior to his appointment to the federal bench.

In 2011, 2013 and 2016, Arias-Marxuach served as an adjunct professor teaching various courses at the Interamerican University of Puerto Rico School of Law.

=== Federal judicial service ===
==== District court service ====
Arias-Marxuach was recommended for a federal judgeship by Resident Commissioner of Puerto Rico Jenniffer González. On April 10, 2018, President Donald Trump announced his intent to nominate Arias-Marxuach to serve as a United States District Judge of the United States District Court for the District of Puerto Rico. On April 12, 2018 his nomination was sent to the Senate. He was nominated to the seat vacated by Judge José A. Fusté, who retired on June 1, 2016. On June 20, 2018, a hearing on his nomination was held before the Senate Judiciary Committee. On July 19, 2018, his nomination was reported out of committee by a voice vote.

On January 3, 2019, his nomination was returned to the president under Rule XXXI, Paragraph 6 of the United States Senate. On January 23, 2019 President Trump announced his intent to renominate Arias-Marxuach for a federal judgeship. His nomination was sent to the Senate later that day. On February 7, 2019, his nomination was reported out of committee by a voice vote. On May 1, 2019, the Senate invoked cloture on his nomination by a 94–5 vote. On May 2, 2019, his nomination was confirmed by a 95–3 vote. He received his judicial commission on May 13, 2019. He was sworn into office by Chief Judge Gustavo Gelpí on May 16, 2019. He became chief judge on October 19, 2021, after Gelpí was elevated to the United States Court of Appeals for the First Circuit.

==== Failed nomination to court of appeals ====
On November 13, 2020, President Trump announced his intent to nominate Arias-Marxuach to a seat on the United States Court of Appeals for the First Circuit. On November 30, 2020, his nomination was sent to the Senate. President Trump nominated Arias-Marxuach to the seat vacated by Judge Juan R. Torruella, who died on October 26, 2020. The nomination was considered controversial, as Trump had already lost the 2020 presidential election to Joe Biden when he announced it, although Arias-Marxuach himself was not controversial. Although he received a hearing before the Senate Judiciary Committee on December 16, 2020, no further action on his nomination was taken due to Republican Judiciary Committee chairman Lindsey Graham's opposition to processing the nomination out of committee during the lame-duck session of the 116th Congress. On December 16, 2020 a hearing on his nomination was held before the Senate Judiciary Committee. On January 3, 2021, his nomination was returned to the president under Rule XXXI, Paragraph 6 of the United States Senate. Later that same day, his renomination was sent to the Senate.

On February 4, 2021, his nomination was formally withdrawn by President Joe Biden. On May 12, 2021, President Biden nominated Gustavo Gelpí, the chief judge of the United States District Court for the District of Puerto Rico, to fill that seat, with his nomination being later confirmed by the Senate.

== See also ==
- List of Hispanic and Latino American jurists

Legal offices
Preceded by José A. Fusté	Judge of the United States District Court for the District of Puerto Rico; 2019–present	Incumbent
Preceded by Gustavo Gelpí	Chief Judge of the United States District Court for the District of Puerto Rico; 2021–present	Incumbent
