= María Antongiorgi-Jordán =

Puerto Rican judge (born 1967)

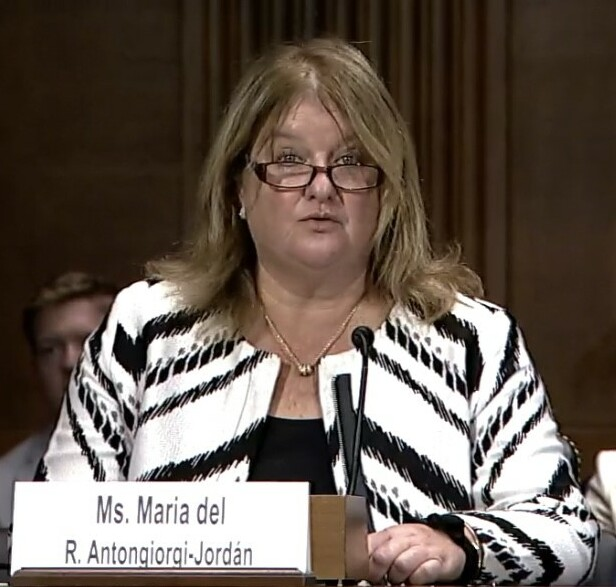

Judge of the United States District Court for the District of Puerto Rico
- Incumbent
- Assumed office December 1, 2022
- Appointed by: Joe Biden
- Preceded by: Gustavo Gelpí

Personal details
- Born: María del Rocio Antongiorgi; 1967 (age 58–59) San Germán, Puerto Rico
- Education: Seton Hill University (BA); Interamerican University of Puerto Rico (JD); Georgetown University (LLM)

María del Rocio Antongiorgi-Jordán (born 1967) is an American attorney who is a United States district judge of the United States District Court for the District of Puerto Rico.

== Education ==
Antongiorgi-Jordán earned a Bachelor of Arts degree from Seton Hill University in 1989, a Juris Doctor from the Interamerican University of Puerto Rico School of Law in 1992, and a Master of Laws from the Georgetown University Law Center in 1994.

== Career ==
From 1995 to 2018, Antongiorgi-Jordán was a partner at McConnell Valdés in San Juan, Puerto Rico. Antongiorgi-Jordán started her career as an attorney in 1995, and later became a Capital Member of the Labor and Employment Law Practice Group. From 2018 to 2019, she was the chief deputy clerk for the United States District Court for the District of Puerto Rico. From 2019 to 2022, she served as chief clerk.

=== Federal judicial service ===
On June 15, 2022, President Joe Biden nominated Antongiorgi-Jordán to serve as a United States district judge of the United States District Court for the District of Puerto Rico. President Biden nominated Antongiorgi-Jordán to the seat vacated by Judge Gustavo Gelpí, who was elevated to the United States Court of Appeals for the First Circuit on October 19, 2021. On July 13, 2022, a hearing on her nomination was held before the Senate Judiciary Committee. On August 4, 2022, her nomination was reported out of committee by a 14–8 vote. On November 14, 2022, the United States Senate invoked cloture on her nomination by a 51–43 vote. On November 15, 2022, her nomination was confirmed by a 55–43 vote. She received her judicial commission on December 1, 2022, and was sworn in on the same day.

== See also ==
- List of Hispanic and Latino American jurists

Legal offices
Preceded by Gustavo Gelpí	Judge of the United States District Court for the District of Puerto Rico; 2022–present	Incumbent
