= Salvador E. Casellas =

Puerto Rican judge (1935–2017)

Senior Judge of the United States District Court for the District of Puerto Rico
- In office June 10, 2005 – November 22, 2017

Judge of the United States District Court for the District of Puerto Rico
- In office September 29, 1994 – June 10, 2005
- Appointed by: Bill Clinton
- Preceded by: Jaime Pieras Jr.
- Succeeded by: Aida Delgado-Colón

Secretary of Treasury of Puerto Rico
- In office 1973–1976
- Governor: Rafael Hernández Colón
- Preceded by: Raymond J. González
- Succeeded by: Julio César Pérez

Personal details
- Born: Salvador Enrique Casellas Moreno; June 10, 1935 San Juan, Puerto Rico
- Died: November 22, 2017 (aged 82) Hato Rey, Puerto Rico
- Citizenship: United States (Puerto Rico)
- Party: Popular Democratic Party (Puerto Rico)
- Spouse: Carmen Ana Toro
- Education: Georgetown University (BSFS); University of Puerto Rico School of Law (LLB); Harvard University (LLM)
- Alma mater: Georgetown University, Harvard University

Salvador Enrique Casellas (June 10, 1935 – November 22, 2017) was a United States district judge of the United States District Court for the District of Puerto Rico.

== Education and career ==
Born in San Juan, Puerto Rico, Casellas graduated from the Academia del Perpetuo Socorro in 1953, with High Honors. He received a Bachelor of Science in Foreign Service from Georgetown University in 1957, a Bachelor of Laws from the University of Puerto Rico Law School in 1960, and a Master of Laws from Harvard Law School in 1961. Served in the United States Army as a Second Lieutenant in the United States Army Armor Branch from 1961 to 1963, and remained in the United States Army Reserve in the Judge Advocate General's Corps from 1963 to 1967. He was in private practice in San Juan from 1962 to 1972. He served as Secretary of the Treasury for the Commonwealth of Puerto Rico from 1973 to 1976, thereafter returning to private practice in San Juan from 1977 to 1994.

== Federal Judicial service ==
On June 21, 1994, Casellas was nominated by President Bill Clinton to a seat on the United States District Court for the District of Puerto Rico vacated by Jaime Pieras, Jr. Casellas was confirmed by the United States Senate on September 28, 1994, and received his commission on September 29, 1994. He assumed senior status on June 10, 2005. Judge Casellas died on November 22, 2017, at Auxilio Mutuo Hospital in Hato Rey, Puerto Rico.

== Personal life ==
Casellas was born in San Juan, Puerto Rico, he assisted the Academia del Perpetuo Socorro, where he graduated 12th grade in 1953, with High Honors. Then in summer 1953 he moved to Washington, D.C. to study his Bachelor of Science in Foreign Service, where he graduated with honors of Magna Cum Laude in 1957. In 1958 he moved back to Puerto Rico, and transferred his credits from Georgetown to the University of Puerto Rico Law School, where he was offered an advanced placement to earn a Bachelor of Laws, where he graduated in 1960 Summa Cum Laude, and a Recluter from the University of Harvard brought him, earning also a Master of Laws from Harvard Law School in 1961. As soon as he finished, He wanted to serve in the United States Army, and due to all of his education, he was commissioned with the rank of Second Lieutenant in the United States Army Armor Branch, where he served from 1961 to 1963, and remained in the United States Army Reserve forming part of the Judge Advocate General's Corps from 1963 to 1967. He was in private practice in San Juan from 1962 to 1972. He served as Secretary of the Treasury for the Commonwealth of Puerto Rico from 1973 to 1976, thereafter returning to private practice in San Juan from 1977 to 1994.

Casellas was married to Carmen Ana Toro and was the father of three children, one of them being the publicly known Pablo Casellas Toro, a famous high profile individual in Puerto Rico who was convicted of assassinating his wife, Carmen Paredes. This case exposed Casellas Sr. and his family into a difficult time. Despite few appearances, it was a complicated moment for him as a Judge and as a Father of an accused criminal by then. This case brought controversy all over Puerto Rico and the U.S. East Coast and in 2014, Pablo Casellas Toro, plead guilty of first degree murder in the death of his wife.

Casellas passed away in the Auxilio Mutuo Hospital in Hato Rey, Puerto Rico on November 22, 2017.

== See also ==
- List of Hispanic and Latino American jurists

Legal offices
Preceded by Jaime Pieras Jr.	Judge of the United States District Court for the District of Puerto Rico; 1994–2005	Succeeded by Aida Delgado-Colón
Political offices
Preceded by Raymond J. González	Secretary of Treasury of Puerto Rico; 1973–1976	Succeeded by Julio César Pérez
