= José A. Fusté =

U.S. federal judge (born 1943)

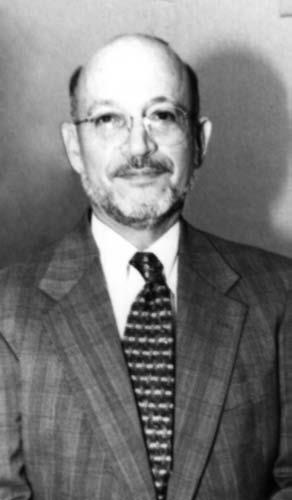

Chief Judge of the United States District Court for the District of Puerto Rico
- In office 2004–2011
- Preceded by: Hector Manuel Laffitte
- Succeeded by: Aida Delgado-Colón

Judge of the United States District Court for the District of Puerto Rico
- In office October 28, 1985 – June 1, 2016
- Appointed by: Ronald Reagan
- Preceded by: Juan R. Torruella
- Succeeded by: Raúl M. Arias-Marxuach

Personal details
- Born: José Antonio Fusté; November 3, 1943 (age 82) San Juan, Puerto Rico
- Education: University of Puerto Rico (BBA, LLB)

José Antonio Fusté (born November 3, 1943) is a former United States District Judge and former Chief Judge of the United States District Court for the District of Puerto Rico.

== Education and career ==
Born on November 3, 1943, in San Juan, Puerto Rico, Fusté received a Bachelor of Business Administration from the University of Puerto Rico in 1965, and a Bachelor of Laws from the University of Puerto Rico Law School in 1968. He was in private practice in San Juan from 1968 to 1985, and began teaching Admiralty law at the University of Puerto Rico School of Law in 1972.

== Federal judicial service ==
On September 27, 1981, Fusté was nominated by President Ronald Reagan to a seat on the United States District Court for the District of Puerto Rico vacated by Judge Juan R. Torruella. Fusté was confirmed by the United States Senate on October 25, 1985, and received his commission on October 28, 1985. He served as Chief Judge from 2004 to 2011. He retired on June 1, 2016.

== Career after judicial service ==
After his retirement, Fusté became a partner at the law firm of Peters, LaPlaca and Fusté (PLF). Fusté's partners include former federal law clerks, including Damian LaPlaca, who worked for Fusté when he was a judge. Fusté's PLF biography indicates that he "can handle all types of civil and criminal federal court litigation and can handle white collar criminal defense in the local courts as well."

== Withdrawal from the bar ==
Fusté's request to withdraw as a member of the Puerto Rico Bar Association, a compulsory membership organization, was approved by the Supreme Court of Puerto Rico.

- Diffenderfer v. Gómez-Colón (2008), concerning whether Puerto Rico’s election ballots should be available in both Spanish and English. Judge Fusté ordered bilingual ballots, citing the Voting Rights Act, Equal Protection Clause, and First Amendment.

== See also ==
- List of Hispanic and Latino American jurists

== Sources ==
Legal offices
Preceded by Juan R. Torruella	Judge of the United States District Court for the District of Puerto Rico; 1985–2016	Succeeded by Raúl M. Arias-Marxuach
Preceded by Hector Manuel Laffitte	Chief Judge of the United States District Court for the District of Puerto Rico; 2004–2011	Succeeded by Aida Delgado-Colón
