= Hector Manuel Laffitte =

U.S. federal judge in Puerto Rico

Senior Judge of the United States District Court for the District of Puerto Rico
- In office November 15, 2005 – February 16, 2007

Chief Judge of the United States District Court for the District of Puerto Rico
- In office 1999–2004
- Preceded by: Carmen Consuelo Cerezo
- Succeeded by: José A. Fusté

Judge of the United States District Court for the District of Puerto Rico
- In office July 27, 1983 – November 15, 2005
- Appointed by: Ronald Reagan
- Preceded by: Hernan Gregorio Pesquera
- Succeeded by: Gustavo Gelpí

Personal details
- Born: Hector Manuel Laffitte; April 13, 1934 (age 92) Ponce, Puerto Rico
- Education: Interamerican University (BA); University of Puerto Rico Law School (LLB); Georgetown University (LLM)

Hector Manuel Laffitte (born April 13, 1934) is a former United States district judge of the United States District Court for the District of Puerto Rico.

== Education and career ==
Born in Ponce, Puerto Rico, Laffitte received a Bachelor of Arts degree from Polytechnic Institute of Puerto Rico (now Interamerican University) in 1955, a Bachelor of Laws from the University of Puerto Rico Law School in 1959, and a Master of Laws from Georgetown University Law Center in 1960. He was in private practice in Puerto Rico from 1960 to 1983.

== Federal judicial service ==
On May 26, 1983, Laffitte was nominated by President Ronald Reagan to a seat on the United States District Court for the District of Puerto Rico vacated by Judge Hernan Gregorio Pesquera. Laffitte was confirmed by the United States Senate on July 26, 1983, and received his commission on July 27, 1983. He served as Chief Judge from 1999 to 2004, assuming senior status on November 15, 2005. Laffitte served in that capacity until his retirement from the bench on February 16, 2007.

== See also ==
- List of Hispanic and Latino American jurists

== Sources ==
Legal offices
Preceded by Hernan Gregorio Pesquera	Judge of the United States District Court for the District of Puerto Rico; 1983–2005	Succeeded by Gustavo Gelpí
Preceded by Carmen Consuelo Cerezo	Chief Judge of the United States District Court for the District of Puerto Rico; 1999–2004	Succeeded by José A. Fusté
