= Gina R. Méndez-Miró =

Puerto Rican judge (born 1974)

Gina Méndez-Miró
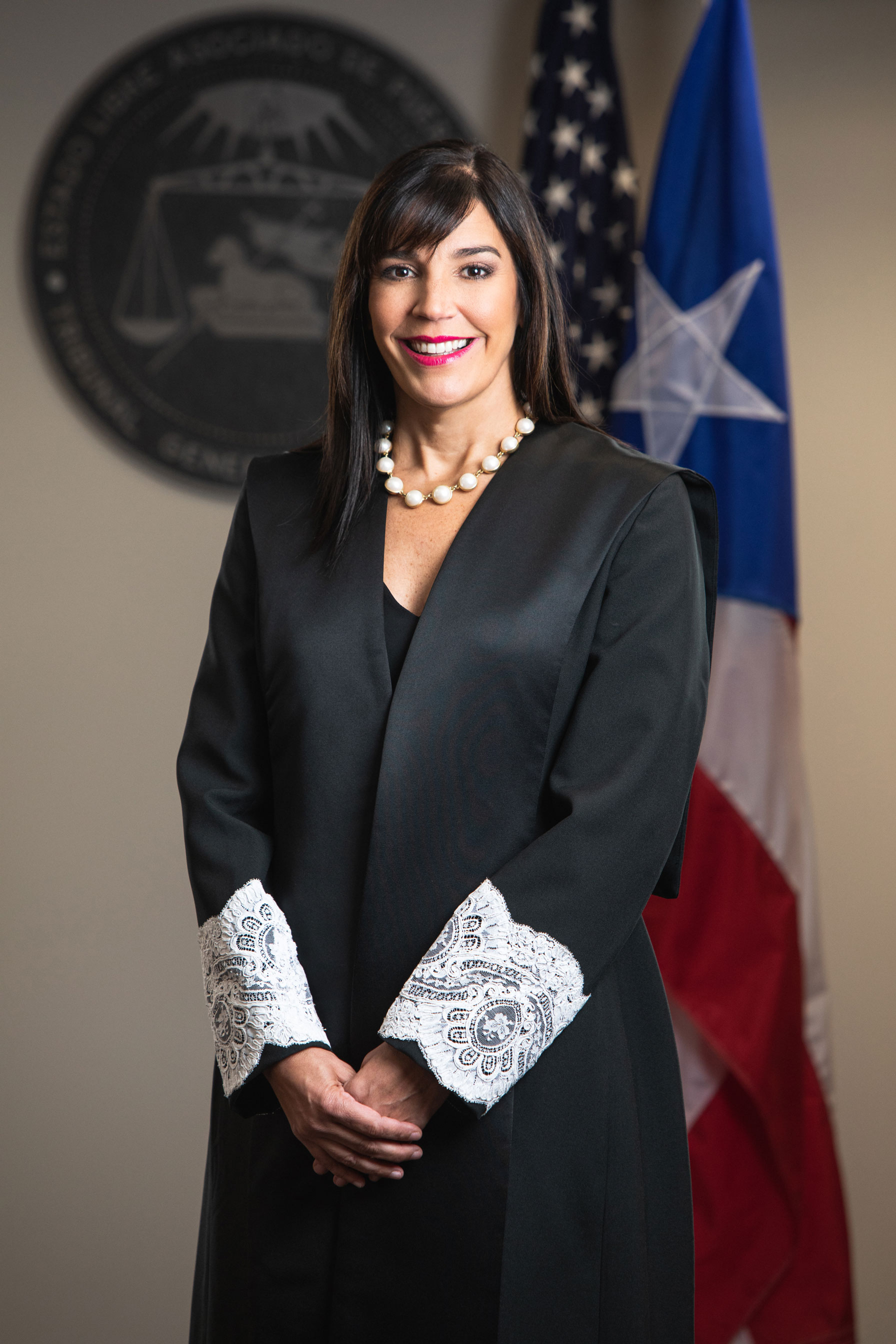
- Official portrait

Judge of the United States District Court for the District of Puerto Rico
- Incumbent
- Assumed office February 24, 2023
- Appointed by: Joe Biden
- Preceded by: Carmen Consuelo Cerezo

Personal details
- Born: 1974 (age 51–52) San Juan, Puerto Rico
- Spouse: Maite Oronoz Rodríguez
- Education: University of Puerto Rico, Río Piedras (BA, JD); Princeton University (MA)

Gina Raquel Méndez-Miró (born 1974) is a Puerto Rican jurist serving as a United States district judge of the United States District Court for the District of Puerto Rico. She previously served as appellate judge of the Puerto Rico Court of Appeals.

== Education ==
Méndez-Miró earned her Bachelor of Arts degree in liberal arts and comparative literature, magna cum laude, from the University of Puerto Rico, Río Piedras Campus in 1996. Later, she obtained a Master of Arts degree in romance languages and literatures from Princeton University. In 2001, she earned a Juris Doctor from the University of Puerto Rico School of Law.

== Career ==
Méndez-Miró began her professional career in private practice as a law clerk in the litigation department of the San Juan law firm Goldman, Antonetti, & Córdova. After being sworn in as an attorney in 2001, she became an associate at O'Neill & Borges. There, she worked at the labor and employment department until 2006, litigating cases before both the federal and state courts and providing legal counsel in matters related to employment discrimination, harassment, wages and hours, ERISA, immigration, employment contracts, and labor aspects of corporate reorganizations, among others topics. In 2006, Méndez-Miró became assistant attorney general for human resources at the Puerto Rico Department of Justice. At the department, she provided legal counsel to the attorney general regarding compliance with local and federal employment laws and regulation, litigated charges filed before the U.S. Equal Employment Opportunity Commission, and oversaw litigation of employment cases, among other related tasks. In 2008, she went on to serve at the Puerto Rico judicial branch as director of judicial programs of the Office of Court Administration. In that capacity, she advised the Chief Justice of the Supreme Court of Puerto Rico and the director of the Office of Courts Administration on public and administrative policies, projects and programs, such as adult and juvenile drug courts, specialized domestic violence courts, self-represented litigant (pro se) centers, justice for the elderly, unified family and juvenile courts, court improvement project, and protocol for access to courts for homeless people. In 2010, she became general counsel and director of the Legal Affairs Office, where she served until 2013, counseling and litigating legal claims, disputes, and disciplinary actions before several state and federal forums.

== Judicial career ==
=== Puerto Rico Court of Appeals ===
In 2016, Puerto Rico Governor Alejandro García Padilla nominated Méndez-Miró as judge to the Puerto Rico Court of Appeals. The Senate Judiciary Committee rendered a report endorsing her appointment and she was unanimously confirmed by the Senate. Before her appointment to the Puerto Rico Court of Appeals, she served as Chief of Staff of the Puerto Rico Senate from 2013 to 2016.

Méndez-Miró served on the Puerto Rico Court of Appeals from 2016 to 2023. The Puerto Rico Court of Appeals is an intermediate appellate court with jurisdiction over cases originating in the Court of First Instance and determinations issued by administrative agencies.

=== United States district court ===
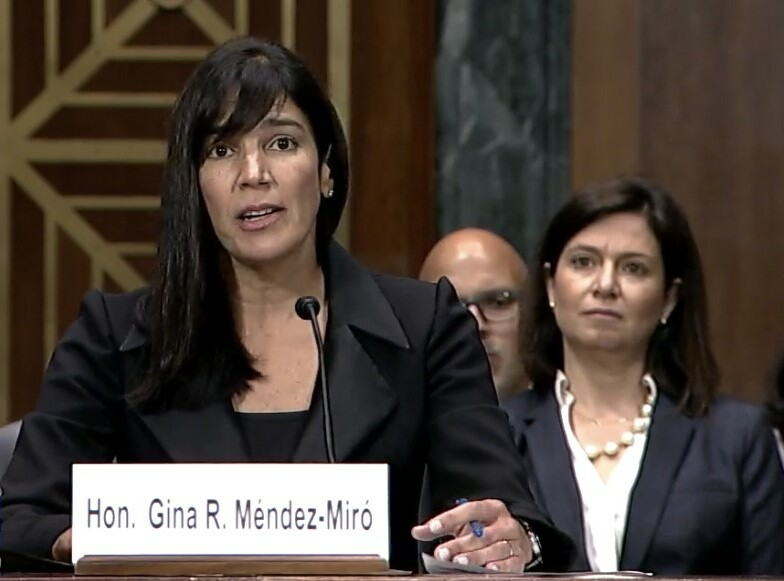
Gina R. Méndez-Miró U.S. Senate Judiciary Committee hearing

On June 15, 2022, President Joe Biden nominated Méndez-Miró to serve as a United States district judge of the United States District Court for the District of Puerto Rico. President Biden nominated Méndez-Miró to the seat vacated by Judge Carmen Consuelo Cerezo, who retired on February 28, 2021. On July 13, 2022, a hearing on her nomination was held before the Senate Judiciary Committee. On August 4, 2022, her nomination was reported out of committee by a 11–9–2 vote. On January 3, 2023, her nomination was returned to the President under Rule XXXI, Paragraph 6 of the United States Senate; she was renominated later the same day. On February 2, 2023, her nomination was reported out of committee by an 11–9 vote. On February 13, 2023, the Senate invoked cloture on her nomination by a 52–44 vote. On February 14, 2023, her nomination was confirmed by a 54–45 vote. Méndez-Miró's confirmation marked the 100th Article Three federal judge confirmed by the United States Senate during the Presidency of Joe Biden. She received her judicial commission on February 24, 2023. She was sworn in on March 1, 2023. She is the first openly LGBT federal district court judge in Puerto Rico.

== Personal life ==
Méndez-Miró is married to Maite Oronoz Rodríguez, chief justice of the Supreme Court of Puerto Rico. Together, they are the mothers of twins, a boy and a girl.

== See also ==
- List of Hispanic and Latino American jurists
- List of LGBT jurists in the United States

Legal offices
Preceded by Carmen Consuelo Cerezo	Judge of the United States District Court for the District of Puerto Rico; 2023–present	Incumbent
