= LGBTQ people in Puerto Rico =

Overview of LGBT in Puerto Rico

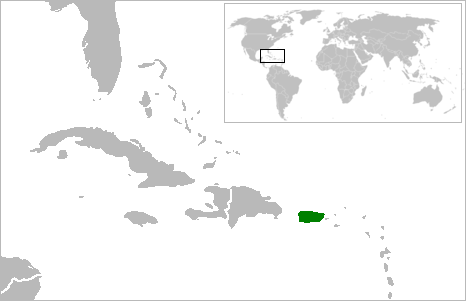
Puerto Rico is an unincorporated territory of the United States, located in the north-eastern Caribbean Sea.

Lesbian, gay, bisexual, and transgender (LGBTQ) people in Puerto Rico have gained some legal rights in recent years. Same sex relationships have been legal in Puerto Rico since 2003, and same-sex marriage and adoptions are also permitted. U.S. federal hate crime laws apply in Puerto Rico.

== Violence against the LGBTQ+ community ==
In recent years, numerous LGBTQ+ people have been murdered with some laying the blame for these acts on politicians and on the religious community.

The dismembered body of 19-year-old college student Jorge Steven López Mercado was discovered 14 November 2009 in Cayey, a city located in the island's interior region. López was widely known as a volunteer for organizations advocating gay rights and HIV prevention, and activists planned remembrance vigils for him in cities including San Juan, Chicago, and New York. According to local police, it is under investigation as a possible hate crime, under the newly approved U.S. Federal hate crimes law which includes crimes against people who are (or perceived to be) gay or transgender people. Juan A. Martinez Matos was arrested a few days after López Mercado's body was discovered. On 12 May 2010, Martinez Matos pleaded guilty and was sentenced to 99 years in prison for the murder of López Mercado.

On 19 April 2010, the body of Ashley Santiago, a transgender woman who resided in the town of Corozal was discovered in the kitchen of her home. Santiago, a stylist at a local salon, was found naked on the floor and was stabbed 14 times by an unknown assailant.

On 13 September 2010, the bodies of Justo Luis "Michelle" Gonzalez and Miguel Orlando "La Flaca" Soto, two transsexuals were found murdered along a road in the small town of Juana Diaz. With these two deaths, LGBTQ+ activists on the island have stated that nine gay and transgender people have been killed over the last 10 months on the island, and local authorities have not adequately responded to these crimes. In October 2012, Malena Suarez, a transgender woman living in Carolina, was found dead at her home as a result of multiple stabbings. Her death marked the 30th anti-LGBTQ+ homicide in Puerto Rico in a decade.

In February 2020, Alexa Negrón Luciano, a homeless trans woman was shot to death in a murder filmed by the perpetrators. The victim previously was misgendered at a restaurant by customers that falsely accused her of attempting to take photos of other women, resulting in the arrival of police. The murder of Alexa highlighted the discrimination and violence transgender people face on the island. A year after her murder authorities had still not solved the case. The murder of Michelle Ramos Vargas in September of that same year marked the sixth killing of a transgender person. From 2019 - 2021, at least twelve transgender people had been murdered in Puerto Rico.

== History of the LGBTQ+ movement ==
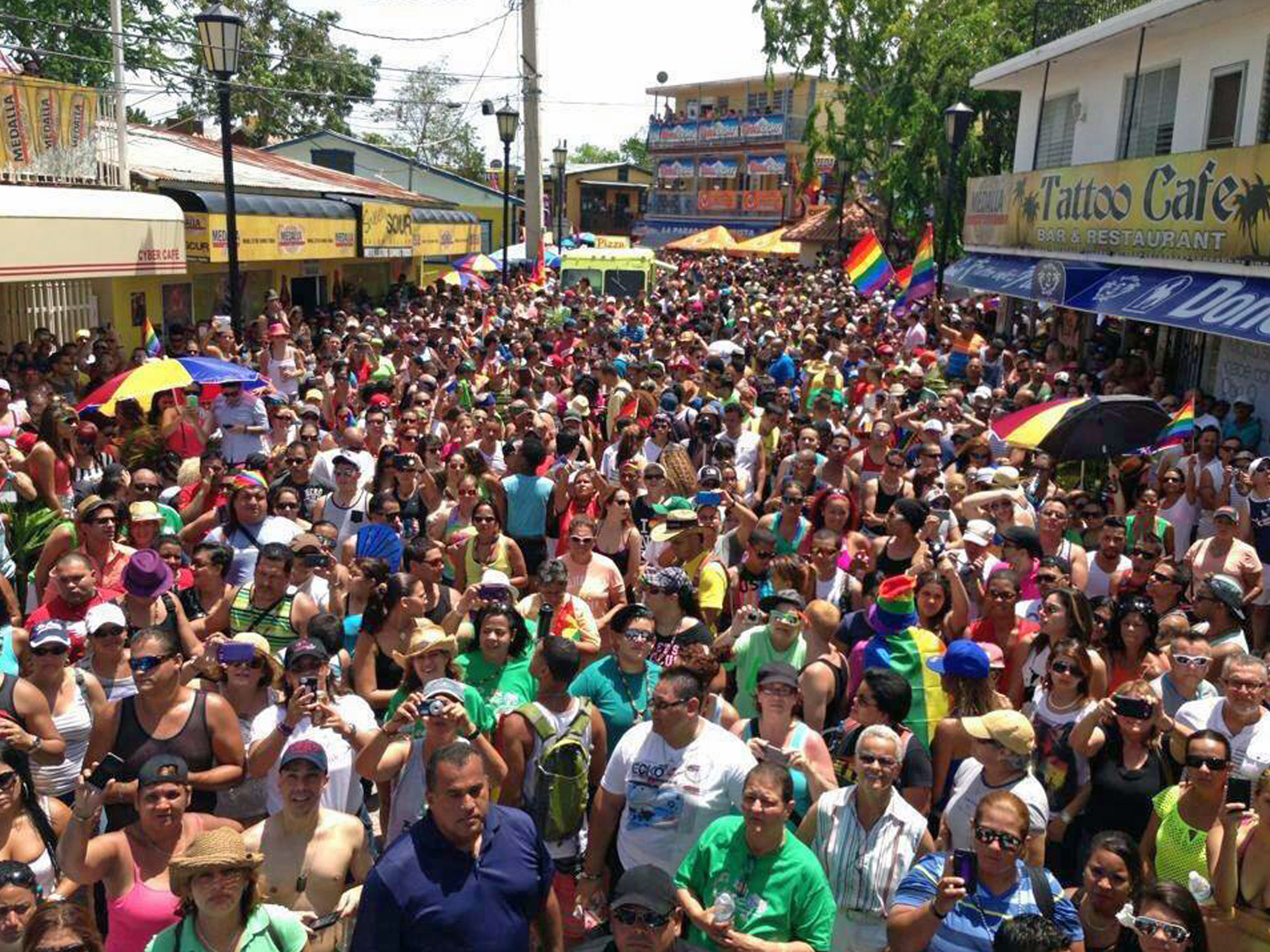
Gay Pride Festival in Boquerón in 2013

In 1973 the Comunidad de Orgullo Gay (the Gay Pride Community) was the first gay rights organization in Puerto Rico. In 1991, the Coalición Puertorriqueña de Lesbianas y Homosexuales (the Puerto Rican Lesbian and Gay Coalition) was also formed. That same year, one of the first LGBTQ+ pride parades was organized in Puerto Rico, and subsequent events occur each year in San Juan and Cabo Rojo.

Between the 1990s and 2008, various LGBTQ+ community groups arose, as there was more public discussion about sexual orientation, gender identity, human rights and the HIV-AIDS pandemic. Today, there are numerous Puerto Rican LGBTQ+ rights organizations and nightclubs, with most of the LGBTQ+ organizations based in and around San Juan, Cabo Rojo, and Vieques.

On 6 November 2012, Popular Democratic Party candidate Pedro Peters Maldonado became the first openly gay politician elected to public office in the island's history, when he won a seat in San Juan's city council.

Soraya Santiago Solla (December 6, 1947 – September 22, 2020) was a pioneer of the transgender community in Puerto Rico as well as the first person in Puerto Rico to change the gender designation on their birth certificate following gender reassignment surgery.

Justin Santiago, a Puerto Rican trans man from Barranquitas was the first trans male in Puerto Rico who changed his name and gender on his birth certificate, and live as a trans man. In his youth, Santiago had been forced to attend conversion therapy sessions, a pseudoscientific practice that aims to change the ideas of LGBTQ+ people. Afterwards, Santiago advocated for the conversion therapy ban which was signed into law by Ricardo Rosselló in 2019.

Loverbar was a queer bar, restaurant and nightclub located in Río Piedras, San Juan, Puerto Rico that opened in 2020 and closed the following year. As a queer club it was the first of its kind in Puerto Rico, with Refinery29 calling it "the queer destination for everything exciting, progressive, and radical about the Puerto Rican queer scene."

== HIV/AIDS epidemic and its impact on the Puerto Rican LGBTQ+ population ==
The HIV/AIDS epidemic affected Puerto Rico significantly, impacting thousands of LGBTQ+ Puerto Ricans. Diagnosis and Management of HIV/AIDS has improved drastically despite ongoing Social stigma surrounding the disease.

From 1981-1991, the territory had the second highest Incidence (epidemiology) of AIDS among all U.S. states and territories according to CDC data. In 1991, AIDS cases in Puerto Rico accounted for 8% of total cases recorded through the US. The overall reported rate of AIDS in Puerto Rico from 1981 to 1999 was 50.9 per 100,000 people.

18% of the total recorded AIDS cases in this time frame in Puerto Rico impacted Men who have sex with men, whereas heterosexual sexual contact accounts for 11%. While the overall percentage of AIDS cases from heterosexual contact is only 11%, there was an increase throughout the data collection from 1981-1991, with heterosexual contact becoming an increasingly prevalent mode of transmission. However, the use of injection drugs was found to be the most common method of transmission, accounting for 66% of cases recorded from 1981-1991. Today, an estimated 16,800 people are living with HIV/AIDS in Puerto Rico. In 2023, there were 389 reported HIV diagnoses on the island.

=== Introduction of HAART (Highly Active Antiretroviral Therapy) in Puerto Rico ===
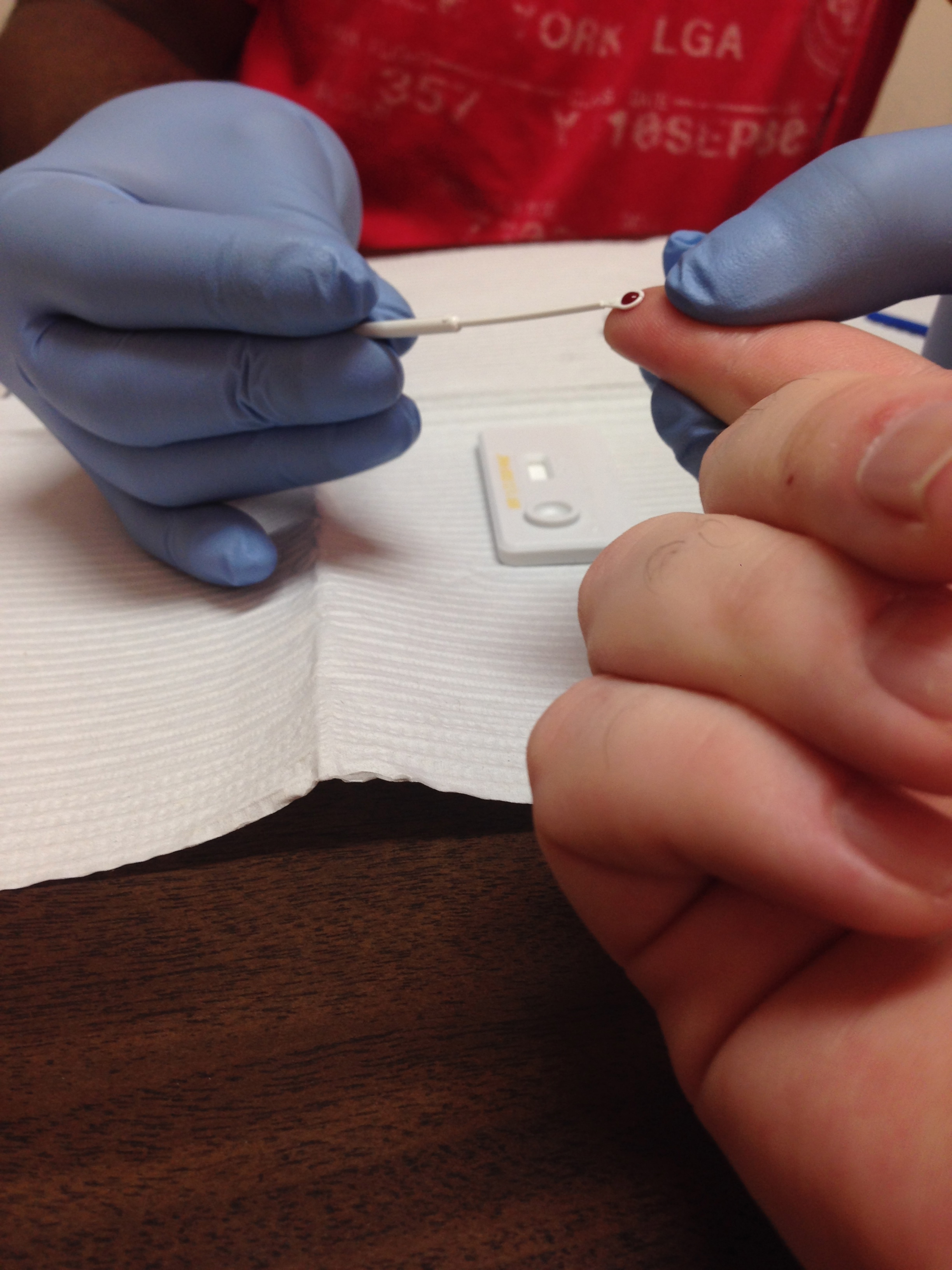
HIV Rapid Testing Administration

Research suggests that the introduction of HAART, highly active antiretroviral therapy, as well as the privatization of the Puerto Rican healthcare system impacted the incidence rate of AIDS on the island. Puerto Rico saw a decrease in the incidence of AIDS by 48.1% from the 6-year period of 1992–1994 (before the introduction of HAART + healthcare privatization) to the period of 1998–2000 (after the introduction of HAART + healthcare privatization).

As of 2022, Puerto Rico has an HIV incidence rate of 7.4 per 100,000, with southern Puerto Rico being disproportionately impacted by the disease. Testing is an important measure for preventing both the spread of HIV and the progression of HIV into AIDS. Puerto Rican health care providers are encouraged to provide HIV testing at an opt-out basis.

=== HIV/AIDS Activism ===
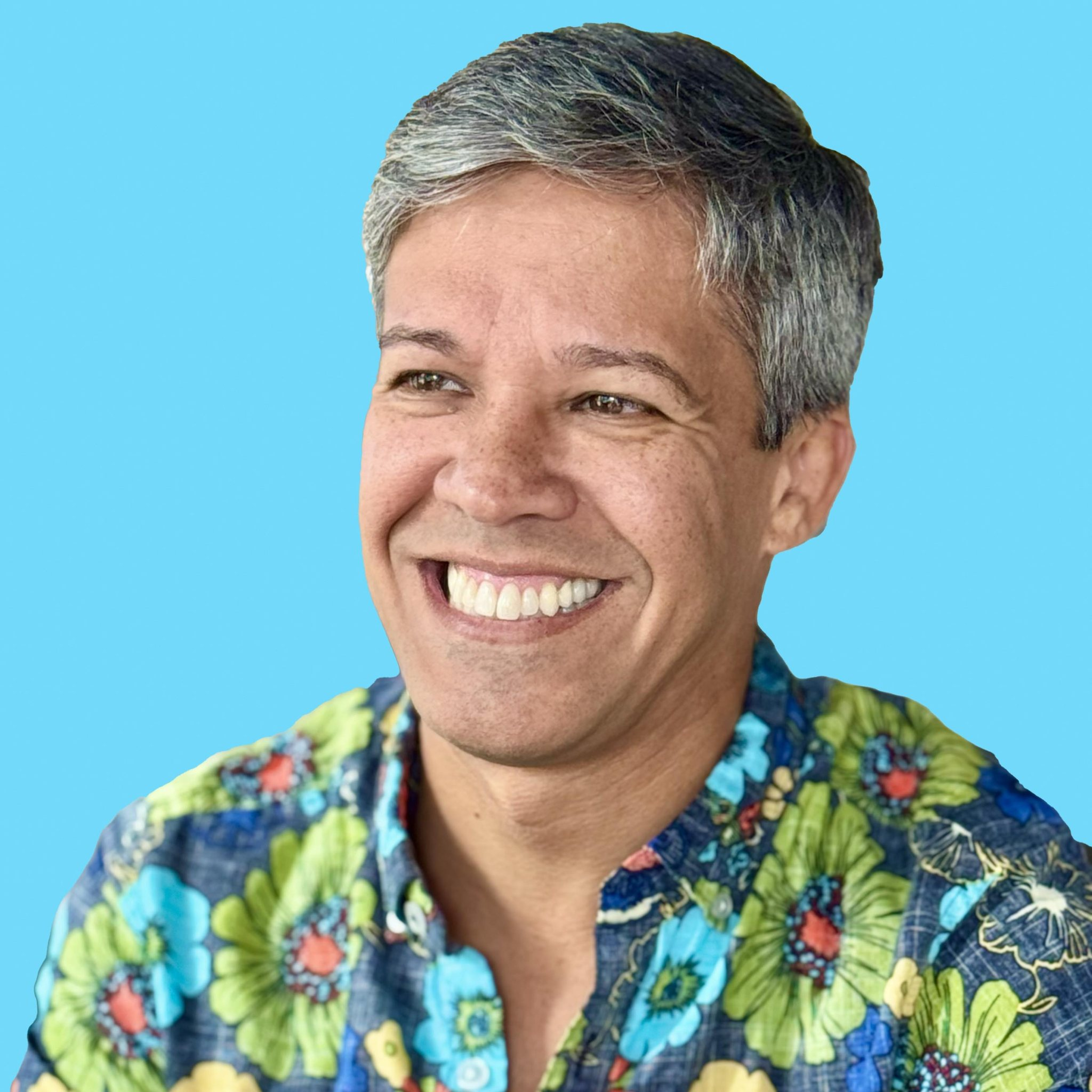
Pedro Julio Serrano, the first out gay and HIV+ Puerto Rican political candidate

In 1988, Pedro Julio Serrano became the first political candidate in Puerto Rico to come out publicly as gay, as well as HIV positive. Serrano, a Puerto Rican politician and activist, details an intense stigma surrounding HIV in Puerto Rico, which was labeled as a "gay disease".

Serrano founded Puerto Rico Para Tod@s, an intersectional activist organization focused on LGBTQ+ equity and justice for all marginalized populations. Throughout the interview, Serrano emphasizes the need for continued activism to protect the safety and rights of LGBTQ+ and other marginalized communities.

== See also ==
- LGBTQ rights in Puerto Rico
- Pedro Julio Serrano
- LGBTQ rights in the Americas
- LGBTQ people in the United States
- Same-sex marriage in Puerto Rico
