= Jaime Pieras Jr. =

U.S. federal judge in Puerto Rico

James Pieras Jr.

Senior Judge of the United States District Court for the District of Puerto Rico
- In office August 1, 1993 – June 11, 2011

Judge of the United States District Court for the District of Puerto Rico
- In office July 15, 1982 – August 1, 1993
- Appointed by: Ronald Reagan
- Preceded by: Seat established by 92 Stat. 1629
- Succeeded by: Salvador E. Casellas

Personal details
- Born: James Pieras Jr. May 19, 1924 San Juan, Puerto Rico
- Died: June 11, 2011 (aged 87) San Juan, Puerto Rico
- Party: Republican
- Education: Catholic University of America (BA); Georgetown University Law Center (JD)

Jaime Pieras Jr. (May 19, 1924 – June 11, 2011) was a United States district judge of the United States District Court for the District of Puerto Rico.

== Education and career ==
Born in San Juan, Puerto Rico, Attended Colegio San José. Pieras obtained a Bachelor of Arts degree from Catholic University of America in 1945 and his Juris Doctor from Georgetown University Law Center in 1948. He served as a Second Lieutenant in the United States Army immediately after World War II, from 1946 to 1947. He entered private practice in Hato Rey, Puerto Rico in 1949, spending 1954 in San Juan, before returning to Hato Rey. Pieras served as Puerto Rico's Republican National Committeeman while in private practice.

== Federal judicial service ==
Pieras was nominated by President Ronald Reagan on June 2, 1982, to the United States District Court for the District of Puerto Rico, to a new seat authorized by 92 Stat. 1629. He was confirmed by the United States Senate on July 13, 1982, and received commission on July 15, 1982. He assumed senior status on August 1, 1993. His service terminated on June 11, 2011, due to his death in San Juan. He maintained a significant caseload until the illness that resulted in his death.

== His creation, the Initial Scheduling Conference ==
In 1986 Catholic University in Washington, D.C. published a law review article authored by Pieras regarding the technique he had implemented in his courtroom through a standing order in all his civil cases which he appropriately had named the “Initial Scheduling Conference” or “ISC” for short.

In his law review article, Pieras advocated that the ISC be incorporated in the Federal Rules of Civil Procedure. And his plea did not fall on deaf ears. Shortly after the article's publication, President Joe Biden (at the time, Senator Joseph Biden, (D.) Delaware, then Chairperson of the Senate Judiciary Committee) personally called Judge Pieras to let him know that he had read his article and that not only had he liked it but that he was taking it very seriously and was intent on amending the Rules of Civil Procedure to include the Initial Scheduling Conference as a mandatory proceeding in federal courts, the reason for which he was creating an advisory committee and that he wanted him to be a member.

Pieras, as a life-long Republican, a former Republican National Committeeman and a Reagan appointee to the bench, hesitated for a few seconds regarding Sen. Biden's invitation to participate in a committee chaired by a Democrat, but he quickly put political convictions aside and graciously accepted to participate in the actual writing of the amendments of the Rules of Civil Procedure which would incorporate his inspiration.

The citation to Pieras' law review article is COMMENTARY: JUDICIAL ECONOMY AND EFFICIENCY THROUGH THE INITIAL SCHEDULING CONFERENCE: THE METHOD., 35 Cath. U.L. Rev. 943.

In carrying-out an ISC, Pieras would meet with the parties' counsel in chambers and would go through each of the parties' allegations one-by-one and got the parties to reach an agreement on each, a time-consuming process at the front-end of the case which more often than not proved that it shortened litigation time and saved litigation expenses in the long run as well. Sometimes an allegation had been denied “as alleged” or “as stated”. Sometimes it was simply denied without explanation. Judge Pieras would then investigate why and on many occasions got counsel to stipulate the facts which originally seemed to be in dispute or got them to agree to a short form of resolving what usually was simply a petty dispute, (like “submit the death certificate in 5 days”, or “provide the certificate of incorporation in 10 days” or “provide a photograph showing the object in 20 days”, etc.) leaving for discovery and for an eventual evidentiary hearing only what was insurmountably the actual real dispute in the case. His ISC resulted in many early settlements.

Because of his implementation of the ISC in all his civil cases, he was the judge who every year consistently solved the highest number of cases in the District, even during his incumbency as senior judge.

== See also ==
- List of Hispanic and Latino American jurists

== Sources ==
Legal offices
Preceded by Seat established by 92 Stat. 1629	Judge of the United States District Court for the District of Puerto Rico; 1982–1993	Succeeded by Salvador E. Casellas
