= Carmen Consuelo Cerezo =

U.S. federal judge in Puerto Rico

Chief Judge of the United States District Court for the District of Puerto Rico
- In office 1993–1999
- Preceded by: Gilberto Gierbolini-Ortiz
- Succeeded by: Hector Manuel Laffitte

Judge of the United States District Court for the District of Puerto Rico
- In office June 30, 1980 – February 28, 2021
- Appointed by: Jimmy Carter
- Preceded by: Seat established by 92 Stat. 1629
- Succeeded by: Gina R. Méndez-Miró

Personal details
- Born: Carmen Consuelo Vargas; August 22, 1940 (age 85) San Juan, Puerto Rico
- Education: University of Puerto Rico (BA, JD); University of Virginia School of Law (LLM)

Carmen Consuelo Cerezo (née Vargas, born August 22, 1940) is a former United States district judge of the United States District Court for the District of Puerto Rico. Cerezo is the first Latina to serve on a federal bench, and the first female federal judge in Puerto Rico. At the time of her retirement in 2021, Cerezo was the last federal judge in active service to have been appointed to her position by President Jimmy Carter. (Note: Although Carter made no appointments to the Supreme Court of the United States, one of his Court of Appeals appointees — Stephen Breyer — was later elevated to the Supreme Court by Bill Clinton and was still in active service as a justice at the time of Cerezo's retirement; Jose Cabranes, another of Carter's District Court appointees, was in active status as a judge of the United States Court of Appeals for the Second Circuit.)

== Education and career ==
Born in San Juan, Puerto Rico, Cerezo received a Bachelor of Arts degree, summa cum laude, from University of Puerto Rico in 1963, a Juris Doctor from University of Puerto Rico School of Law in 1966, and a Master of Laws from University of Virginia School of Law in 1988. She was in private practice in Puerto Rico for only eight months between 1966 and 1967 before being appointed chief law clerk for the Chief Justice of the Supreme Court of Puerto Rico, Luis Negrón Fernández. After one year under Chief Justice Fernandez, Cerezo became a law clerk for the United States District Court for the District of Puerto Rico, maintaining that position from 1967 to 1972. She was a judge of the Superior Court of the Commonwealth of Puerto Rico from 1972 to 1976, and of the Court of Intermediate Appeals of the Commonwealth of Puerto Rico from 1976 to 1980.

== Federal judicial service ==
On May 14, 1980, President Jimmy Carter nominated Cerezo to a new seat on the United States District Court for the District of Puerto Rico created by 92 Stat. 1629. She was confirmed by the United States Senate on June 26, 1980, and received her commission on June 30, 1980. She served as Chief Judge from 1993 to 1999. Cerezo retired from the court on February 28, 2021.

== Notable rulings ==
In the 2015 Colón-Marrero v. Conty-Pérez decision, Cerezo ruled that purging Puerto Rican voters who did not vote in an election from the register of eligible voters violated the National Voter Registration Act, the Help Americans Vote Act, and the first and fourteenth amendments to the United States Constitution.

On March 28, 2018, Cerezo ruled in Arroyo v. Rosselló that Puerto Rico must allow transgender people to change their gender marker on their birth certificate. In her opinion, Cerezo wrote,

The right to identify our own existence lies at the heart of one’s humanity. And so, we must heed their voices: ‘the woman that I am,’ ‘the man that I am.’ Plaintiffs know they are not fodder for memoranda legalese. They have stepped up for those whose voices, debilitated by raw discrimination, have been hushed into silence. They cannot wait for another generation, hoping for a lawmaker to act. They, like Linda Brown, took the steps to the courthouse to demand what is due: their right to exist, to live more and die less.

In August 2018, Cerezo ordered Mora Development Corp. to pay $3 million for a Clean Water Act violation after the corporation discharged more than 29 million gallons of sewage into the municipal stormwater system and into Quilan Creek as well as discharging sewage into the La Plata River without proper treatment.

== Personal ==
She was married to Benny Frankie Cerezo, an attorney, former state legislator and political analyst until his death on April 15, 2013, and is the mother of one son, a partner in a Miami law firm, and one daughter.

== See also ==
- List of first women lawyers and judges in the United States
- List of Hispanic and Latino American jurists
- List of Puerto Ricans
- History of women in Puerto Rico
- List of United States federal judges by longevity of service

== Notes ==
Legal offices
Preceded by Seat established by 92 Stat. 1629	Judge of the United States District Court for the District of Puerto Rico; 1980–2021	Succeeded by Gina R. Méndez-Miró
Preceded by Gilberto Gierbolini-Ortiz	Chief Judge of the United States District Court for the District of Puerto Rico; 1993–1999	Succeeded by Hector Manuel Laffitte
