= Pedro Julio Serrano =

Puerto Rican LGBT activist

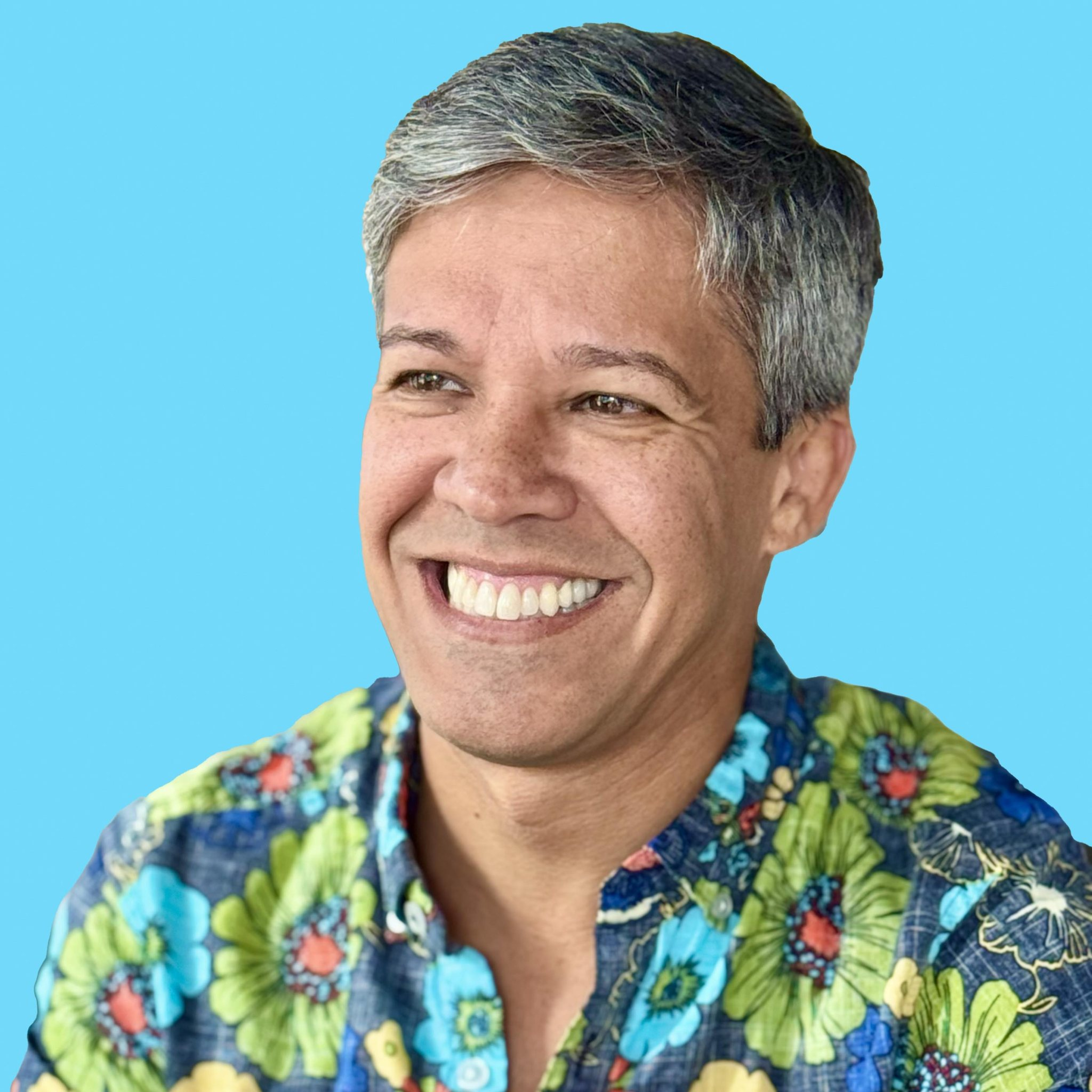
- Education: Communications; University of Puerto Rico
- Occupations: Puerto Rico Para Todes - (President); Orgullo Boqueron - (President) PolicyLink - Deputy Director of Puerto Rico Strategies LGBTQ+ Federation of Puerto Rico - President
- Website: pedrojulio.com

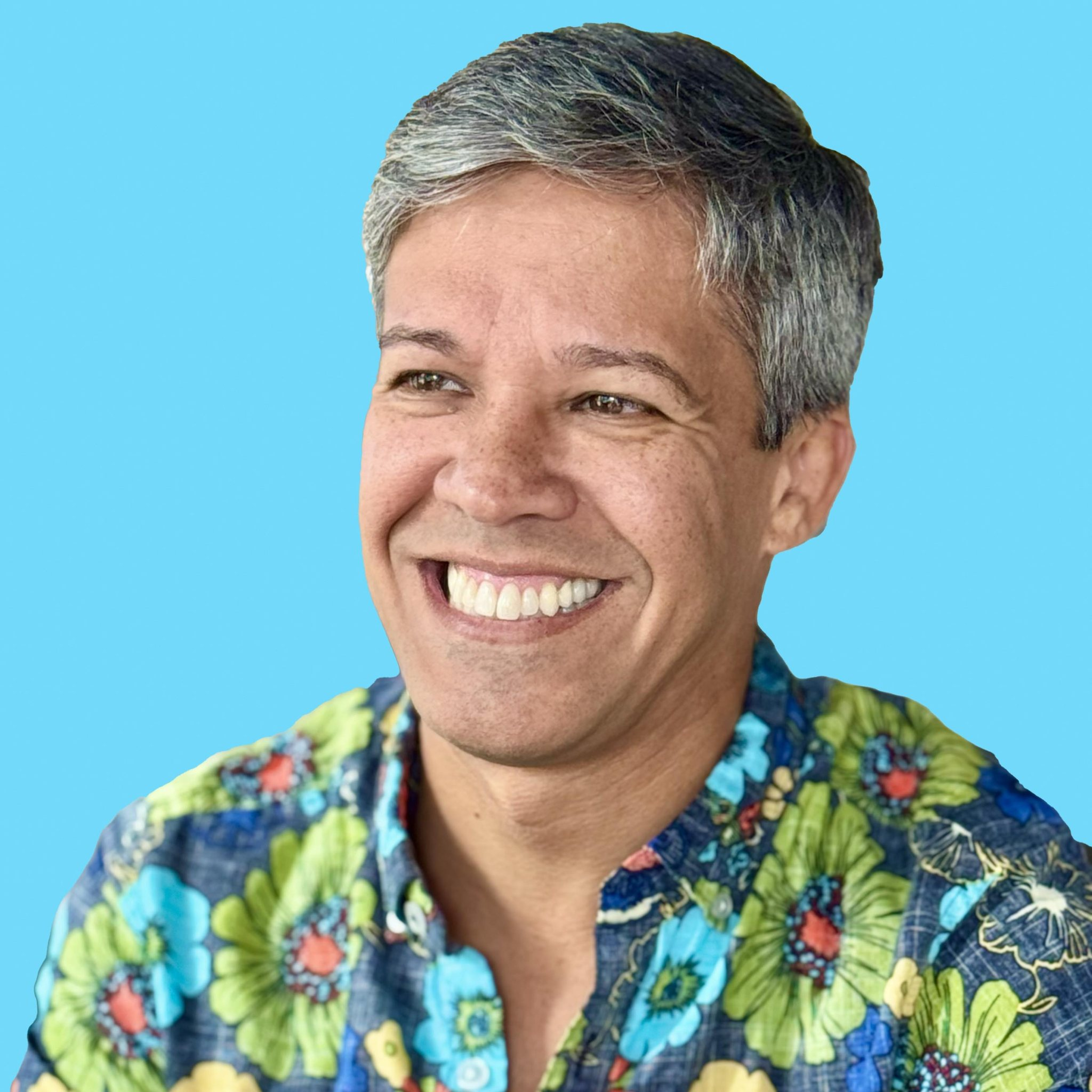
Human rights activist Pedro Julio Serrano

Pedro Julio Serrano (born October 2, 1974, in Ponce, Puerto Rico) is a human rights activist. He is the founding president of the LGBTQ+ Federation of Puerto Rico and Puerto Rico Para Todes. He made history as the first openly LGBTQ+ political candidate in Puerto Rican history. He is a former advisor to former New York City Council Speaker Melissa Mark Viverito and former San Juan Mayor Carmen Yulín Cruz. Serrano also served as executive director of Programa Vida and Clínica Transalud of the Municipality of San Juan. He later worked as director of development and public policy at Waves Ahead, and as external affairs officer of True Self Foundation. Serrano currently works as deputy director of Puerto Rico Strategies at PolicyLink. He also manages Orgullo Boquerón, the largest LGBTQ+ Pride event in the Caribbean.

== Biography ==
Serrano grew up in Isla Verde, a district of Carolina. He attended primary and secondary school at the Colegio La Piedad and later studied communications at the University of Puerto Rico, Rio Piedras Campus.

In 1998, Serrano made history when he became the first openly gay and HIV+ person to run for elective office in the history of Puerto Rico, when he announced his candidacy to the House of Representatives of Puerto Rico. He is also a cancer survivor, after he won a battle with oral cancer in 2010.

He began his career in activism when he served as Director of Policy and Media for the Fundación de Derechos Humanos (Human Rights Foundation) in Puerto Rico. Later, he served as Director of Communications of LLEGO, the National Organization for Lesbian, Gay, Bisexual and Transgender Latinos in the United States, which was based in Washington, DC. In 2005, Serrano moved to New York City where he worked as Program Coordinator for Voices for Equality at Freedom to Marry, an organization that fought for marriage equality. He then worked for seven years as Director of Public and Media Relations for the National LGBTQ Task Force, one of the LGBTQ+ movement's leading organization in the United States. He then worked as Senior Advisor at the New York City Council, from 2015 to 2016, to the Speaker of New York City Council, Melissa Mark Viverito. He was the director of the scheduling and advance office, as well as was her liaison to LGBTQ+, Puerto Rican and Latino communities. After 10 years living in New York City, Serrano moved back to the island in June 2016.

=== Boards ===
Serrano has been a member of the Commission for Combating Sexual Orientation and Gender Identity Discrimination of the Puerto Rican Bar Association and a member of the advisory board of the Puerto Rico Chapter of the American Civil Liberties Union. He has also been a member of the Advisory Committee on Human Rights of the Civil Rights Commission of Puerto Rico and the Advisory Committee of the Puerto Rican Initiative to Develop Empowerment (PRIDE), an organization that advocates for the Puerto Rican LGBTQ+ community in New York City. He also served as co-chairman of the National Latino Coalition for Justice, which advocates for equality in marriage. These efforts culminated with the establishment of "Unidas", the national Latino Human Rights LGBTQ+ organization for Latinas/os in the U.S. and Puerto Rico. Serrano served as co-chair of Unidas.

== Activism ==
=== Puerto Rico Para Todes ===
In 2003, he founded "Puerto Rico Para Todes" (Puerto Rico for Everyone), a nonprofit organization that fights for equal rights and inclusion of LGBTQ+ communities. He is also an advocate of the social justice of all human beings in Puerto Rico. Since 2003, he has served as president of Puerto Rico Para Todes.

=== Speaker ===
Serrano has given speeches and conferences in Puerto Rico in several campuses of the "Universidad de Puerto Rico" and the "Universidad Interamericana", "Universidad del Sagrado Corazón" and "Pontifica Universidad Católica de Puerto Rico", as well as "Universidad del Turabo and Universidad del Este". He has also given conferences at the Universities of Yale, Brown, Syracuse, Swarthmore, UConn, Mount Holyoke College, Hostos Community College and the Center for Puerto Rican Studies at Hunter College. He has also been the keynote speaker at various conferences such as the 9th LLEGO meeting – the National Organization for Lesbian, Gay, Bisexual and Transgender Latinos/as, in the Second Educational Day Against Homophobia and the Third Colloquium "Del otro la'o?"(From the other side): Perspectives on queer sexualities.

Serrano has advocated against hate crimes, denouncing and demanding the investigation of possible crimes motivated by prejudice against sexual orientation and/or gender identity. He led a historic visit of elected officials from New York and Illinois who visited Puerto Rico in solidarity with the fight against hate crimes targeting LGBT people.

=== Boycott campaigns ===
In 2010, thanks to a campaign initiated and led by Serrano, the #1 Puerto Rican television program, SuperXclusivo, publicly apologized to LGBT communities and people living with HIV, for using derogatory language against them. As a result, the television station, WAPA TV, also released "In WAPA we Respect Diversity", a historical public service campaign to educate on the use of offensive language, eliminate discrimination and respect diversity.

In late 2012 and early 2013, Serrano was one of the leaders and spokesperson of the Boycott La Comay, a movement supported by more than 80,000 people which resulted in the cancellation of SuperXclusivo a program of WAPA TV.

In 2020 Serrano called for another boycott of "La Comay" after new comments made by the host which were considered racist.

=== LGBTQ+ Pride Parade in Boquerón ===
In mid-2014, with just one month to prepare, Serrano and his organization "Puerto Rico Para Todes" took charge of the LGBT Pride Parade of Boquerón. Together with his brother Héctor and his company Mújica Group, he produced the largest parade in the history of Puerto Rico with more than 40 thousand people in attendance, according to police and media. He has continued to lead Orgullo Boquerón in 2019, 2020 and in the present.

=== LGBTQ+ laws in Puerto Rico ===
In early 2013, he worked directly with Senator Ramón Luis Nieves in the establishment of the Senate Project 238 to prohibit discrimination based on sexual orientation and gender identity in employment. Also, he collaborated with Representative Luis Vega Ramos in the filing of House Bill 488 to include sexual orientation, marital status and gender identity in the protections of Law 54 that regulate domestic violence. These projects became Law 22 and Law 23 of 2013 when Gov. Alejandro García Padilla signed them at a ceremony at La Fortaleza with several guests, which included Serrano.

After meeting with the Secretary of Labor, Vance Thomas and Arturo Rios, the advisor of Labor Affairs of Governor Alejandro Garcia Padilla, an executive order was issued to give the benefit medical plan to cohabiting couples. Later, two bills gave that right to LGBTQ+ couples in the public and private sector. Also, Serrano was instrumental in pushing the administration to issue an executive order to allow transgender people to change their sex markers on driver's licenses.

In 2020 he expressed his opposition to changes in the civil code which would create issues related to the sex change in the documents of trans people.

Marriage equality in Puerto Rico

Under the leadership of Serrano, his organization "Puerto Rico Para Todes" joined as a co-plaintiff in the federal lawsuit filed by Ada Conde and Ivonne Alvarez to achieve the right to marry for LGBTQ+ people in Puerto Rico. In an effort led by Lambda Legal, four couples and "Puerto Rico Para Todes" joined the lawsuit in June 2014. Marriage equality became a reality in the United States in June 2015 and in Puerto Rico it was reaffirmed by a decision from the federal appeals court in July of that same year.

Puerto Rico Day Parade

Pedro Julio Serrano was announced as one of the key honorees of the Puerto Rican Day Parade in 2016, where he was named "Orgullo Puertorriqueño" or Puerto Rican Pride, the same title that Lin-Manuel Miranda received the prior year. His advocacy led the National Puerto Rican Day Parade to dedicate its 2016 parade to the LGBTQ+ struggle to celebrate the win of marriage equality and to honor the contributions of LGBTQ+ Puerto Ricans.

Pulse Shooting

The Pulse nightclub shooting, in which a shooter killed 49 people and wounded 53 more at an LGBTQ+ bar in Orlando, Florida, occurred the same day that Serrano was honored at the National Puerto Rican Day Parade. Serrano travelled the next day to Orlando. where he met with survivors, grieving families, and authorities. He did more than 100 interviews with local, state, national and international outlets. He meet 14 of the 23 families of the Puerto Ricans that were killed and 11 of the survivors. His advocacy was recognized by the Puerto Rican musician Ricky Martin. He stated in July 2016 that Puerto Rico was still mourning its victims.

== Awards and recognitions ==
Serrano has received numerous awards for his work towards social justice and for the rights of the Puerto Rican and Latino LGBTQ+ communities. At his high school graduation in 1992, he won the "Sister Sheila O'Brien Award", the highest honor given at his school, for his outstanding contribution to the community. He also received the Leadership Award from the Rotary Club of Isla Verde.

In 2000, he was awarded with the Solidarity Award as Male Activist of the Year from the Healing Christ Church. In 2003, he was recognized as one of the most outstanding LGBTQ+ activists in Puerto Rico by OrgulloBoricua. In 2004, he was recognized as one of Top 10 LGBTQ+ activists in Latino community by Ambiente. In 2005, he was recognized as one of five most outstanding LGBTQ+ activists by Tentaciones. In 2007, he received the Pride Award by the PRIDE organization in New York City.

In 2009, he received the Bronze Star, Silver Star and the Bravo Award by public acclamation at the LGBTQ+ Pride Parade in Boquerón. He was also the grand marshal of the 7th. LGBTQ+ Pride Parade of the West in Boquerón, Puerto Rico. In addition, in the same year was he was chosen by MyLatinoVoice.com as one of the 25 most influential LGBTQ+ Latinos. In 2010, he was named one of the 5 most promising Puerto Ricans in New York by the newspaper AM New York.

In 2010, Serrano received the Puerto Rican Pride Award – through a video – by the Puerto Rican superstar Ricky Martin. This prize is awarded by Comité Noviembre, an organization that brings together the most important and recognized boricuas institutions of New York City to extol the identity of the Puerto Ricans in recognition of the immense social, cultural, political and artistic contributions of the Puerto Rican community in the United States.

In 2011, he received the annual award of the Queens Lesbian and Gay Pride Committee and dedicated the prize to a young Puerto Rican 13 years old boy who is openly gay and founded a support group at a school for kids. Serrano was also recognized as "Outstanding Insurgent" during the 9th. Colloquium "Ni Una Vida Más Para La Toga de la Facultad de Derecho Eugenio María de Hostos" at Mayaguez, Puerto Rico (translation: "Not One More Life for the Robe of the Eugenio María de Hostos Law School"). That same year, Pedro Julio and his family, including his parents and his brothers, were awarded the Pride Award for "exemplary family".

In New York City for LGBT Pride Month in 2011, Serrano was recognized by the Bronx Pride Community Center, Boogie Down Pride and BrainPower with the LGBTQ +Pride Award and Allies in the Bronx. In addition, the Manhattan Borough President, Scott Stringer, recognized him with a proclamation declaring June 23, 2011 as the "Pedro Julio Serrano Day at the Manhattan Borough" at the annual celebration of LGBTQ+ Pride. Also, El Diario/La Prensa – the second largest Spanish-language newspaper largest circulation in the US – recognized him with "EL" Award, which honors the most influential and prominent Latinos in New York.

In addition, in 2011, he was recognized as one of the Ten Outstanding Young People of Puerto Rico in 2011 by the Junior Chamber International of Puerto Rico. This recognition is historic because it is the first time they picked a young openly gay man to receive such a distinction. The Latino Queens LGBTQ+ community, through Jessenia Marie Rosa, gave a recognition to Serrano as the leading activist at the Paparazzi Awards in New York City.

In 2012, he was also recognized as one of the most influential Latino activist by the Huffington Post. He was also named Honorary Trans America by the TransLatinasNYC group for their solidarity with the trans community in New York City. At the end of 2012, he was named one of the main protagonists of 2012 by the magazine Caras in a collector's edition that recognizes the most outstanding figures of the year in Puerto Rico.

In mid-2013, he was awarded the Dennis DeLeon Voice Commitment Award at the Cielo Latino Gala of the Latino Commission on AIDS for his tireless advocacy for the rights of the LGBTQ+ community and people living with HIV.

In late 2013, Serrano was named as one of the 20 Latinos Trailblazers of the Year by Being Latino – one of the most important social networks of the Latino community in the US. In addition, after eight years in New York City, he returned for a year to his homeland to continue the fight. In early 2014, Serrano was recognized as one of the rising stars by the Hispanic Latino Coalition. This recognition is given to 40 leaders under 40 who have excelled in various areas in the Latino community.

Serrano was one of the key honorees of the National Puerto Rican Day Parade, where he was named "Orgullo Puertorriqueño" or Puerto Rican Pride. In December, the University Gardens High School dedicated its Puerto Rican celebration to Serrano for his activism in creating a more just society. Also, in late 2016, Serrano was a keynote speaker and the recipient of the special recognition at the Puerto Rican Leadership Summit in Orlando, Florida, and was named as one of the 11 most prominent LGBTQ+ Latinos by NBC Latino.

In 2021, Serrano was named one of the Latino leaders who are making Latino History when he was nominated to the Good Morning America's Inspiration List 2021.

In 2024, Serrano was named as grand marshall for the Trans Pride Day during the celebration of the Trans Goofy Games at the Central Park in San Juan. He was also honored as the godfather of Pride Rincón, during its fourth edition. Serrano was also recognized as the Leader of the Year by the LGBTQ+ PR, International Weddings, The Experience held at the Convention Center in San Juan. He was also named as one of the five Latin@ LGBTQ+ activists breaking barriers and inspiring change by Latinally. Serrano was also named by Coalición de Coaliciones as one of the Puerto Rican LGBTQ+ icons and was awarded the Yellow Wave for Brilliance by Waves Ahead Puerto Rico for "making the LGBTQ+ and our organization shine."

== See also ==
- LGBTQ people in Puerto Rico
- LGBTQ rights in Puerto Rico
