= Gustavo Gelpí =

American judge (born 1965)

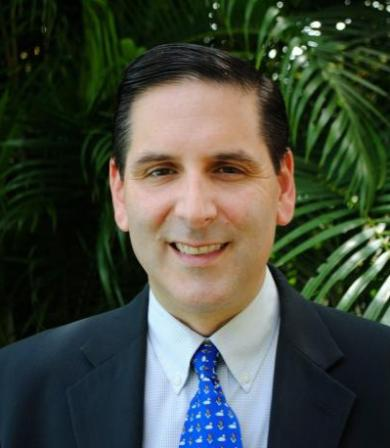

Judge of the United States Court of Appeals for the First Circuit
- Incumbent
- Assumed office October 19, 2021
- Appointed by: Joe Biden
- Preceded by: Juan R. Torruella

Chief Judge of the United States District Court for the District of Puerto Rico
- In office April 13, 2018 – October 20, 2021
- Preceded by: Aida Delgado-Colón
- Succeeded by: Raúl M. Arias-Marxuach

Judge of the United States District Court for the District of Puerto Rico
- In office August 1, 2006 – October 20, 2021
- Appointed by: George W. Bush
- Preceded by: Hector Manuel Laffitte
- Succeeded by: María Antongiorgi-Jordán

Personal details
- Born: Gustavo Antonio Gelpí Jr. December 11, 1965 (age 60) San Juan, Puerto Rico
- Education: Brandeis University (BA); Suffolk University (JD)

Gustavo Antonio Gelpí Jr. (born December 11, 1965) is an American lawyer who serves as a United States circuit judge of the United States Court of Appeals for the First Circuit. He is a former chief United States district judge of the United States District Court for the District of Puerto Rico.

== Early life and career ==
Born in 1965, in San Juan, Puerto Rico, Gelpí attended high school at Academia del Perpetuo Socorro. He received a Bachelor of Arts degree from Brandeis University in 1987 and a Juris Doctor from Suffolk University Law School in Boston, Massachusetts in 1991. He was a law clerk to Juan Pérez-Giménez of the United States District Court for the District of Puerto Rico from 1991 to 1993. Gelpí was then an assistant federal public defender in the office of the federal public defender from 1993 to 1997. He worked in the Puerto Rico Department of Justice from 1997 to 1999, first as an assistant to the attorney general, and then as assistant attorney general for the office of legal counsel. During Puerto Rico Governor Pedro Rosselló's second term, Gelpí served as Puerto Rico's Solicitor General from 1999 to 2000. He was a special litigation counsel in the law firm of McConnell Valdes from January to June in 2001.

== Federal judicial service ==
=== United States magistrate judge service ===
Gelpí served as a United States magistrate judge of the United States District Court for the District of Puerto Rico from 2001 to 2006.

=== District court service ===
On April 24, 2006, President George W. Bush nominated Gelpí to a seat on the United States District Court for the District of Puerto Rico vacated by Hector M. Laffitte, who assumed senior status on November 15, 2005. Gelpí was confirmed by voice vote on July 20, 2006, and received his judicial commission on August 1, 2006. He served as Chief Judge from April 13, 2018, to October 20, 2021. His service as a district court judge was terminated on October 20, 2021, when he was elevated to the court of appeals.

In 2013, Gelpi began serving a term as the president of the Federal Bar Association.

=== Court of appeals service ===
On May 12, 2021, President Joe Biden nominated Gelpí to be a United States circuit judge for the United States Court of Appeals for the First Circuit, to the seat vacated by Judge Juan R. Torruella, who died on October 26, 2020. On June 23, 2021, a hearing on his nomination was held before the Senate Judiciary Committee. During his confirmation hearing, Republican senators criticized Gelpí over his critique of the Insular Cases that established Puerto Rico's rights. On July 22, 2021, his nomination was reported out of committee by a 12–10 vote. On October 7, 2021, Majority Leader Chuck Schumer filed cloture on his nomination. Later that day, the United States Senate invoked cloture on his nomination by a 54–39 vote. On October 18, 2021, Gelpí was confirmed by a 52–41 vote. He received his judicial commission on October 19, 2021. He is the second judge of Hispanic origin to serve on the United States Court of Appeals for the First Circuit and the second judge from Puerto Rico ever to sit on the First Circuit.

== See also ==
- List of Hispanic and Latino American jurists
- List of Puerto Ricans

Legal offices
Preceded by Hector Manuel Laffitte	Judge of the United States District Court for the District of Puerto Rico; 2006–2021	Succeeded by María Antongiorgi-Jordán
Preceded by Aida Delgado-Colón	Chief Judge of the United States District Court for the District of Puerto Rico; 2018–2021	Succeeded by Raúl M. Arias-Marxuach
Preceded by Juan R. Torruella	Judge of the United States Court of Appeals for the First Circuit; 2021–present	Incumbent
