= Paul Charlton =

Paul Charlton may refer to:

- Paul K. Charlton, former US attorney for Arizona
- Paul Charlton (judge) (1856–1917), United States district judge from Puerto Rico
- Paul Charlton (rugby league) (born 1941), Great Britain rugby league player
- Paul Charlton (technologist), American computer technologist who led the development of QuickTime 2.0 for Windows
- Paul Charlton (born 1970), known as The Mighty Jingles, British YouTuber
