= List of The Judge Advocate General's Legal Center and School alumni =

This is a list of notable alumni who have attended or graduated The Judge Advocate General's Legal Center and School. The JAG School is generally considered the most exclusive graduate service academy within the U.S. Federal Government. It is considered "highly selective" with an acceptance rate ranging between 4 and 7%. In 2017, the Army JAG Corps and subsequent JAG School only accepted 200 of 4,000 applicants. The JAG School has a long history of supplying attorneys into the military and federal government roles, particularly the federal judiciary.

The JAG School is often considered "the U.S. Army’s graduate school equivalent of its United States Military Academy."

== Law and politics ==
=== United States government ===
==== Executive council members ====
- J. Reuben Clark, Under Secretary of State
- Fred Dutton, Assistant Secretary of State
- Judd H. Lyons, Assistant Secretary of Defense
- Robert C. O'Brien, 28th U.S. National Security Advisor

==== U.S. attorneys ====
- John L. Brownlee, United States Attorney for Western District of Virginia
- Frank DeArmon Whitney, United States Attorney for the Eastern District of North Carolina
- Maria Chapa Lopez, United States Attorney for the Middle District of Florida
- David C. Joseph, United States Attorney for the Western District of Louisiana
- Kenneth John Gonzales, United States Attorney for the District of New Mexico
- Ira K. Wells, United States Attorney for the District of Puerto Rico
- Bobby Christine, United States Attorney for the Southern District of Georgia
- Duane Kees, United States Attorney for the Western District of Arkansas
- Grant C. Jaquith, United States Attorney for the Northern District of New York
- Kasey Warner, United States Attorney for the Southern District of West Virginia

==== U.S. diplomatic figures ====
- John Bingham, United States Ambassador to Japan
- Ralph Elihu Becker, United States Ambassador to Honduras
- Scott Brown, United States Ambassador to New Zealand & Samoa
- J. Reuben Clark, United States Ambassador to Mexico
- Russell F. Freeman, United States Ambassador to Belize

==== House ====
- William Vollie Alexander Jr., U.S. Representative from Arkansas
- Syd Herlong, U.S. Representative from Florida
- Greg Steube, U.S. Representative from Florida
- John A. T. Hull, U.S. Representative from Iowa
- Steve Buyer, U.S. Representative from Indiana
- Goodloe Byron, U.S. Representative from Maryland
- Anthony Brown, U.S. Representative from Maryland
- Elmer Ryan, U.S. Representative from Minnesota
- Webb Franklin, U.S. Representative from Mississippi
- Mark Amodei, U.S. Representative from Nevada
- John Laurance, U.S. Representative from New York
- Martin B. McKneally, U.S. Representative from New York
- Lee Zeldin, U.S. Representative from New York
- Alexander Pirnie, U.S. Representative from New York
- Gregory W. Carman, U.S. Representative from New York
- John H. Ray, U.S. Representative from New York
- George H. Wilson, U.S. Representative from Oklahoma
- Patrick Murphy, U.S. Representative from Pennsylvania
- Joe L. Evins, U.S. Representative from Tennessee
- Louie Gohmert, U.S. Representative from Texas

==== Senate ====
- J. Bennett Johnston, U.S. Senator from Louisiana
- Dennis DeConcini, U.S. Senator from Arizona
- Frank Moss, U.S. Senator from Utah
- George B. Martin, U.S. Senator from Kentucky
- Scott Brown, U.S. Senator from Massachusetts

==== Federal appellate judges ====
- G. Steven Agee, Judge of the United States Court of Appeals for the Fourth Circuit
- Roger Miner, Judge of United States Court of Appeals for the Fourth Circuit
- Leslie H. Southwick, Judge of United States Court of Appeals for the Fourth Circuit
- Carl E. Stewart, Chief Judge of United States Court of Appeals for the Fourth Circuit
- William Lockhart Garwood, Judge of the United States Court of Appeals for the Fifth Circuit
- John Weld Peck II, Judge of the United States Court of Appeals for the Sixth Circuit
- Pasco Bowman II, Chief Judge of the United States Court of Appeals for the Eighth Circuit
- David R. Hansen, Chief Judge of the United States Court of Appeals for the Eighth Circuit
- Evan Wallach, Judge of United States Court of Appeals for the Federal Circuit
- Herbert Choy, Judge of the United States Court of Appeals for the Ninth Circuit
- Gregory W. Carman, Chief Judge of the United States Court of International Trade

==== Federal district court judges ====
- Liles C. Burke, Judge of the United States District Court for the Northern District of Alabama
- L. Scott Coogler, Chief Judge of the United States District Court for the Northern District of Alabama
- Douglas L. Rayes, Judge of the United States District Court for the District of Arizona
- Morrison C. England Jr., Chief Judge of the United States District Court for the Eastern District of California
- James M. Ideman, Judge of the United States District Court for the Central District of California
- Gary L. Taylor, Judge of the United States District Court for the Central District of California
- Royce Lamberth, Chief Judge, United States District Court for the District of Columbia
- Donald L. Graham, Judge of United States District Court for the Southern District of Florida
- Winston Arnow Chief Judge of the United States District Court for the Northern District of Florida
- Howell W. Melton, Judge of the United States District Court for the Middle District of Florida
- J. P. Boulee, Judge United States District Court for the Northern District of Georgia
- Charles A. Pannell Jr., Judge of the United States District Court for the Northern District of Georgia
- Derrick Watson, Judge of the United States District Court for the District of Hawaii
- Dee D. Drell, Chief Judge of United States District Court for the Western District of Louisiana
- David C. Joseph, Judge of the United States District Court for the Western District of Louisiana
- Frederic N. Smalkin, Chief Judge of the United States District Court for the District of Maryland
- Edward L. Leahy Judge of United States District Court for the New Hampshire
- Steven J. McAuliffe, Chief Judge of the United States District Court for the District of New Hampshire
- John Laurance, Judge of United States District Court for the District of New York
- Kenneth John Gonzales, Judge of the United States District Court for the District of New Mexico
- Frank DeArmon Whitney, Chief Judge of the United States District Court for the Western District of North Carolina
- David Dudley Dowd Jr., Judge of the United States District Court for the Northern District of Ohio
- William Huntington Kirkpatrick, Judge United States District Court for the Eastern District of Pennsylvania
- Edmund V. Ludwig, Judge of the United States District Court for the Eastern District of Pennsylvania
- Kim R. Gibson, Judge of the United States District Court for the Western District of Pennsylvania
- Jose Victor Toledo, Judge of the United States District Court for the District of Puerto Rico
- Ira K. Wells, Judge of United States District Court for the District Puerto Rico
- Andrew Wendell Bogue, Chief Judge of the United States District Court for the District of South Dakota
- Lawrence L. Piersol, Chief Judge of the United States District Court for the District of South Dakota
- Robert J. O'Conor Jr., Judge of the United States District Court for the Southern District of Texas
- Sim Lake, Judge of the United States District Court for the Southern District of Texas
- James R. Spencer, Judge of the United States District Court for the Eastern District of Virginia.
- Zahid Quraishi, Judge of the United States District Court for the District of New Jersey.

==== State government ====
- Marc Racicot Governor of Montana
- Blanton Winship, Governor of Puerto Rico
- Mike Stack, Lieutenant Governor of Pennsylvania
- Bob McDonnell, Governor of Virginia
- Anthony Brown, Lieutenant Governor of Maryland
- Ron DeSantis, Governor of Florida

==== Attorneys general ====
- Marc Racicot, Attorney General of Montana
- Carl Danberg, Attorney General of Delaware
- Beau Biden, Attorney General of Delaware and son of President Joe Biden.
- Bob McDonnell, Attorney General of Virginia
- Grenville Beardsley, Attorney General of Illinois
- Mark Brnovich, Attorney General of Arizona
- Tim Griffin, Attorney General of Arkansas
- Alan Wilson, Attorney General of South Carolina

==== State judiciary ====
- Arno H. Denecke, Chief Justice of Oregon Supreme Court
- John A. Hull, Associate Justice of the Supreme Court of the Philippines
- J. Philip Johnson, Associate Justice North Dakota Supreme Court
- Price Daniel, Associate Justice of the Texas Supreme Court
- N. Patrick Crooks, Associate Justice of the Wisconsin Supreme Court
- Robert E. Davis, Chief Justice of the Kansas Supreme Court
- Herbert R. Brown, Associate Justice of the Ohio Supreme Court
- A. William Sweeney, Associate Justice of the Ohio Supreme Court
- Charles B. Zimmerman, Associate Justice of the Ohio Supreme Court
- Josephine L. Hart, Associate Justice of the Arkansas Supreme Court
- Joseph T. Walsh, Associate Justice of Delaware Supreme Court
- N. Patrick Crooks, Associate Justice of Wisconsin Supreme Court
- Paul A. Chase, Associate Justice of the Vermont Supreme Court
- Rudolph J. Daley, Associate Justice of the Vermont Supreme Court
- William C. Hill, Associate Justice of the Vermont Supreme Court
- Ernest W. Gibson III, Associate Justice of the Vermont Supreme Court
- Jerod E. Tufte, Associate Justice of the North Dakota Supreme Court

==== Non U.S. political figures ====
- Richard Reeve Baxter, Judge of the International Court of Justice
- Amnon Straschnov, Military Advocate General of the Israel Defense Forces

==== Other military figures ====
- Robyn J. Blader, U.S. National Guard general
- Dana K. Chipman, Judge Advocate General of the United States Army
- Caroline A. Crenshaw, Commissioner of the U.S. Securities and Exchange Commission.
- Flora D. Darpino, first woman Judge Advocate General of the United States Army
- Moe Davis, Air Force colonel
- Andrew S. Effron, chief judge of the United States Court of Appeals for the Armed Forces
- David Jonas, United States government official, nominee for General Counsel of the United States Department of Energy
- James E. McPherson, Judge Advocate General of the United States Navy, executive director of the National Association of Attorneys General
- Grier Martin, State Representative (D-North Carolina)
- Mark S. Martins, chief prosecutor in the trial of Khalid Sheik Mohammed
- Hubert Miller, Olympic bobsledder
- Haldane Robert Mayer, United States federal appellate judge (Court of Appeals for the Federal Circuit)
- Lisa M. Schenck, professor, George Washington University Law School
- William K. Suter, 19th Clerk of the Supreme Court of the United States
