= George M. Byse =

American politician

George Milton Byse (September 15, 1858 – December 1, 1936) was an American farmer and politician.

Born in Wautoma, Waushara County, Wisconsin, Byse was a farmer and was involved with the creamery company and the farmers union. He was president of the Waushara County Agricultural Society. Byse served as supervisor and chairman of the Wautoma Town Board and on the board of education. He also served on the Waushara County Board of Supervisors and was chairman of the county board. Byse also served as the Waushara County treasurer and was involved with the Republican Party, In 1915, Byse served in the Wisconsin State Assembly. Byse moved to Neillsville, Wisconsin. He died in Neillsville, Wisconsin.
