= Paul Charlton (judge) =

American judge

Judge of the United States District Court for the District of Puerto Rico
- In office July 11, 1911 – March 26, 1913
- Appointed by: William Howard Taft
- Preceded by: John J. Jenkins
- Succeeded by: Peter J. Hamilton

Personal details
- Born: November 2, 1856 Harrisburg, Pennsylvania, U.S.
- Died: June 3, 1917 (aged 60) Juana Díaz, Puerto Rico, U.S.
- Education: University of Chicago

Paul Charlton (November 2, 1856 – June 3, 1917) was a United States district judge for the United States District Court for the District of Puerto Rico from 1911 to 1913.

== Biography ==
Charlton was born in Harrisburg, Pennsylvania and studied law at Yale University as a classmate of future President William Howard Taft and Puerto Rico Governor William H. Hunt. Charlton practiced law in Harrisburg, Pennsylvania and in Omaha, Nebraska. Prior to his two years on the bench, he served as legal counsel for the War Department's Bureau of Insular Affairs, which was responsible for the U.S. Government's administration of Puerto Rico and the Philippines.

Charlton was appointed as the federal judge in Puerto Rico by President Taft in 1911. He served until March 26, 1913 and was succeeded by Peter J. Hamilton. He remained in Puerto Rico, practicing law in San Juan.

In 1910, Paul Charlton's son Porter Charlton murdered his wife at Lake Como and then returned to the United States. When the United States District Court for the District of New Jersey ordered Porter Charlton's extradition, Paul Charlton appealed in a case heard by the United States Supreme Court as Charlton v. Kelly. On June 10, 1913 the Supreme Court affirmed the extradition order. Paul Charlton died in Juana Díaz, Puerto Rico following surgery for a carbuncle.

== Sources ==
- "Ex-Judge Charlton Dies in Porto Rico" The New York Times, 5 June 1917.
- Guillermo A. Baralt, History of the Federal Court in Puerto Rico: 1899-1999 (2004) (also published in Spanish as Historia del Tribunal Federal de Puerto Rico)
- Oppenheim, L. (2005). International Law: A Treatise. The Lawbook Exchange, Ltd.

Preceded by John J. Jenkins	Judge, United States District Court for the District of Puerto Rico; 1911–1913	Succeeded by Peter J. Hamilton
