= Wautoma, Wisconsin =

- City
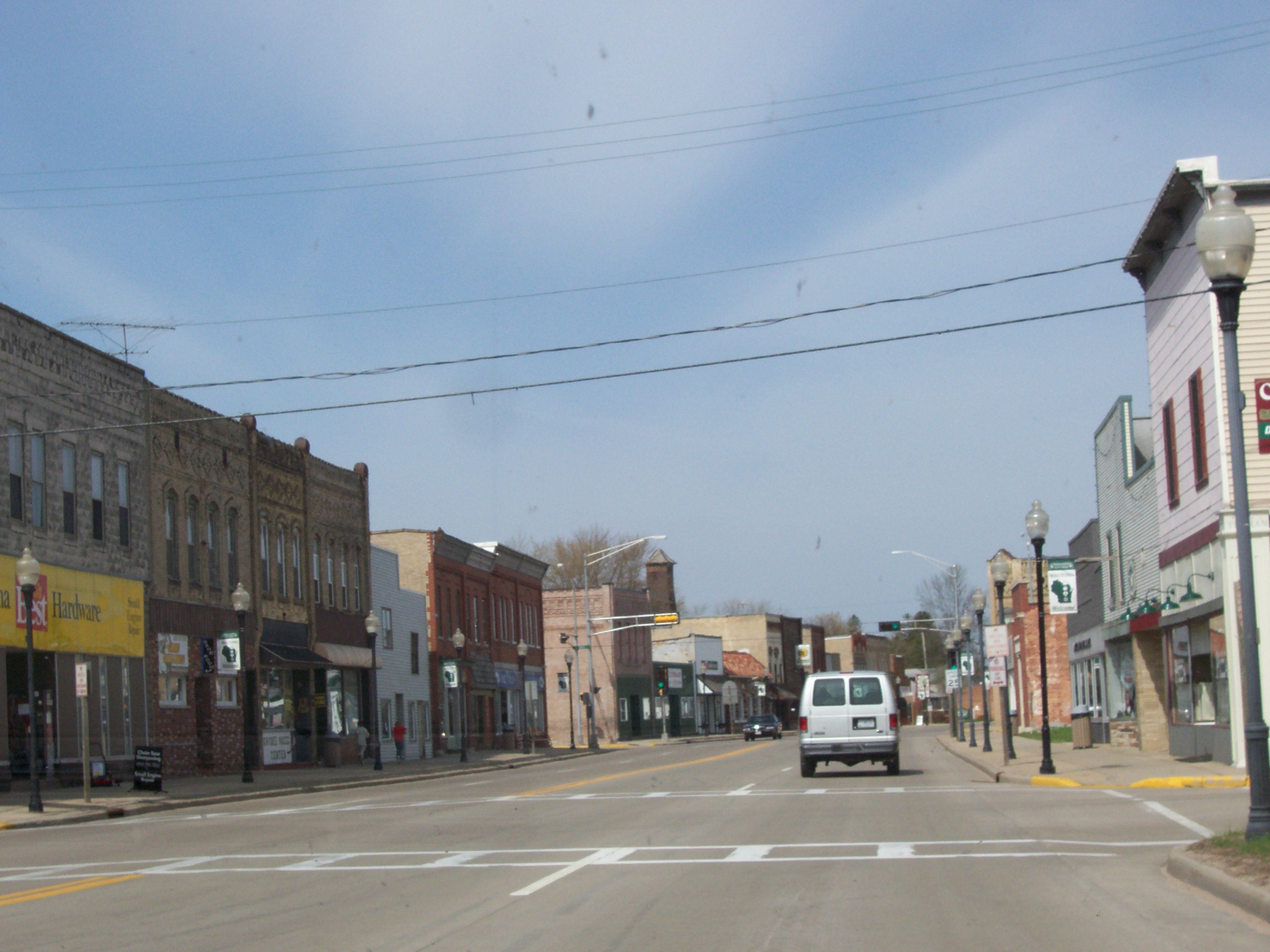
- Looking west at downtown Wautoma, Wisconsin

- Location of Wautoma in Waushara County, Wisconsin.

- Location within Wisconsin Location within the United States
- Coordinates: 44°4′17″N 89°17′23″W
- Country: United States
- State: Wisconsin
- County: Waushara

Area
  - Total: 2.83 sq mi (7.34 km^{2})
  - Land: 2.79 sq mi (7.23 km^{2})
  - Water: 0.042 sq mi (0.11 km^{2})
- Elevation: 863 ft (263 m)

Population (2020)
  - Total: 2,209
  - Density: 791/sq mi (306/km^{2})
- Time zone: UTC-6 (Central (CST))
  - Summer (DST): UTC-5 (CDT)
- ZIP Code: 54982
- Area code: 920
- FIPS code: 55-84625
- GNIS feature ID: 1576330
- Website: http://www.cityofwautoma.com/

Wautoma is a city in and the county seat of Waushara County, Wisconsin, United States. The population was 2,209 at the 2020 census.

The city consists of three noncontiguous areas: one is entirely surrounded by the Town of Wautoma, the second is entirely surrounded by the Town of Dakota, and the third and largest straddles the boundary between the two towns.

Wautoma calls itself the "Christmas tree capital of the world". The Kirk Company of Tacoma, Washington, operated the "Wautoma plantation" of more than 10,000 acres (4,000 ha) of Christmas trees, beginning in 1953.

On August 29, 1992, the town was struck by a half-mile wide F-3 tornado, killing 2 people, injuring 30 others, and causing over $5 million in damage.

== Geography ==
According to the United States Census Bureau, the city has a total area of 2.72 square miles (7.04 km^{2}), of which 2.68 square miles (6.94 km^{2}) is land and 0.04 square miles (0.10 km^{2}) is water.

== Demographics ==
Historical population
Census	Pop.	Note	%±
1880	295		—
1910	964		—
1920	1,046		8.5%
1930	1,044		−0.2%
1940	1,180		13.0%
1950	1,376		16.6%
1960	1,466		6.5%
1970	1,624		10.8%
1980	1,629		0.3%
1990	1,784		9.5%
2000	1,998		12.0%
2010	2,218		11.0%
2020	2,209		−0.4%
U.S. Decennial Census

=== 2010 census ===
As of the census of 2010, there were 2,218 people, 945 households, and 487 families living in the city. The population density was 827.6 inhabitants per square mile (319.5/km^{2}). There were 1,061 housing units at an average density of 395.9 per square mile (152.9/km^{2}). The racial makeup of the city was 88.3% White, 1.4% African American, 0.7% Native American, 0.4% Asian, 6.3% from other races, and 2.9% from two or more races. Hispanic or Latino of any race were 15.8% of the population.

There were 945 households, of which 28.7% had children under the age of 18 living with them, 32.6% were married couples living together, 14.4% had a female householder with no husband present, 4.6% had a male householder with no wife present, and 48.5% were non-families. 44.1% of all households were made up of individuals, and 21.7% had someone living alone who was 65 years of age or older. The average household size was 2.21 and the average family size was 3.13.

The median age in the city was 35.4 years. 25.3% of residents were under the age of 18; 9.5% were between the ages of 18 and 24; 25.2% were from 25 to 44; 22.8% were from 45 to 64; and 17.2% were 65 years of age or older. The gender makeup of the city was 50.5% male and 49.5% female.

=== 2000 census ===
As of the census of 2000, there were 1,998 people, 806 households, and 429 families living in the city. The population density was 800.8 people per square mile (308.6/km^{2}). There were 877 housing units at an average density of 351.5 per square mile (135.4/km^{2}). The racial makeup of the city was 94.04% White, 1.10% Black or African American, 0.70% Native American, 0.85% Asian, 2.00% from other races, and 1.30% from two or more races. 7.21% of the population were Hispanic or Latino of any race.

There were 806 households, out of which 27.2% had children under the age of 18 living with them, 37.7% were married couples living together, 11.0% had a female householder with no husband present, and 46.7% were non-families. 40.4% of all households were made up of individuals, and 20.1% had someone living alone who was 65 years of age or older. The average household size was 2.20 and the average family size was 3.04.

In the city, the population was spread out, with 24.0% under the age of 18, 9.4% from 18 to 24, 25.5% from 25 to 44, 17.6% from 45 to 64, and 23.5% who were 65 years of age or older. The median age was 39 years. For every 100 females, there were 98.2 males. For every 100 females age 18 and over, there were 89.5 males.

The median income for a household in the city was $31,723, and the median income for a family was $37,500. Males had a median income of $27,546 versus $19,648 for females. The per capita income for the city was $16,006. About 5.2% of families and 11.5% of the population were below the poverty line, including 10.7% of those under age 18 and 18.3% of those age 65 or over.

== Transportation ==
Wautoma is served by the Wautoma Municipal Airport (FAA LID: Y50).

== Media ==
=== News media ===
- The Waushara Argus is the weekly newspaper.

=== Radio ===
- WAUH radio broadcasts at 102.3 FM.

== High school sports ==
Wautoma High School has won five state championships, three in boys' track and field, one in boys' basketball, and one in football. In 1980, Wautoma High School won the Class B State Basketball Championship.

== Notable people ==
- Jared Abbrederis, Green Bay Packers, Detroit Lions, and Wisconsin Badgers wide receiver
- Robert E. Behnke, Wisconsin State Representative
- William Belter, Wisconsin State Representative
- Robyn J. Blader, U.S. National Guard general
- George M. Byse, Wisconsin State Representative
- Boyd A. Clark, Wisconsin State Representative and jurist
- Richard W. Hubbell, Wisconsin State Representative
- Edward F. Kileen, Wisconsin State Senator
- Robert L. D. Potter, Wisconsin State Senator
- Jon Wilcox Wisconsin State Representative, Wisconsin Chief Judge, Wisconsin Supreme Court Justice
- June Wandrey, World War II veteran, writer
- William C. Webb, Wisconsin and Kansas politician and jurist

== Images ==
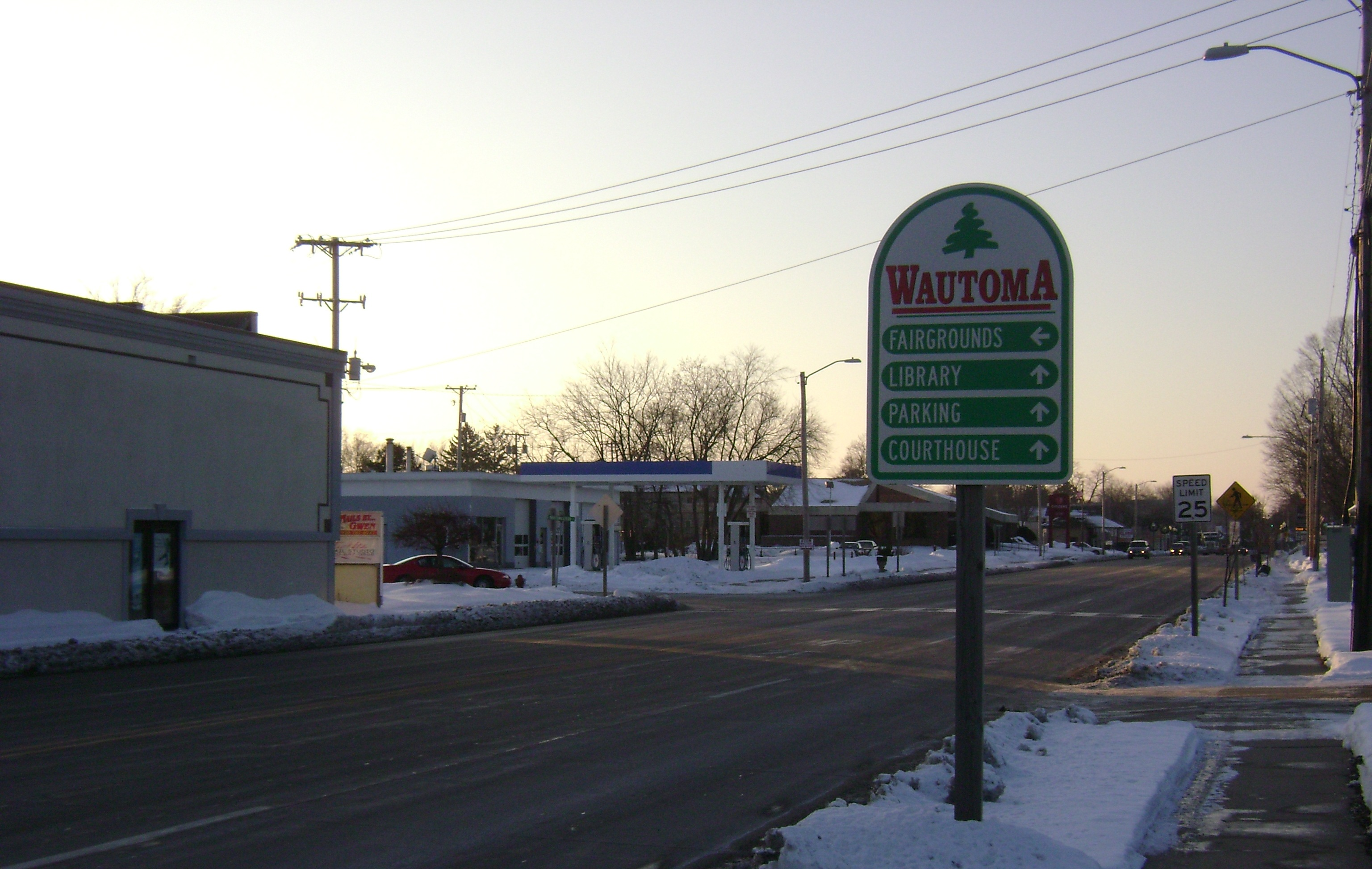
Road sign, looking west down Highway 21

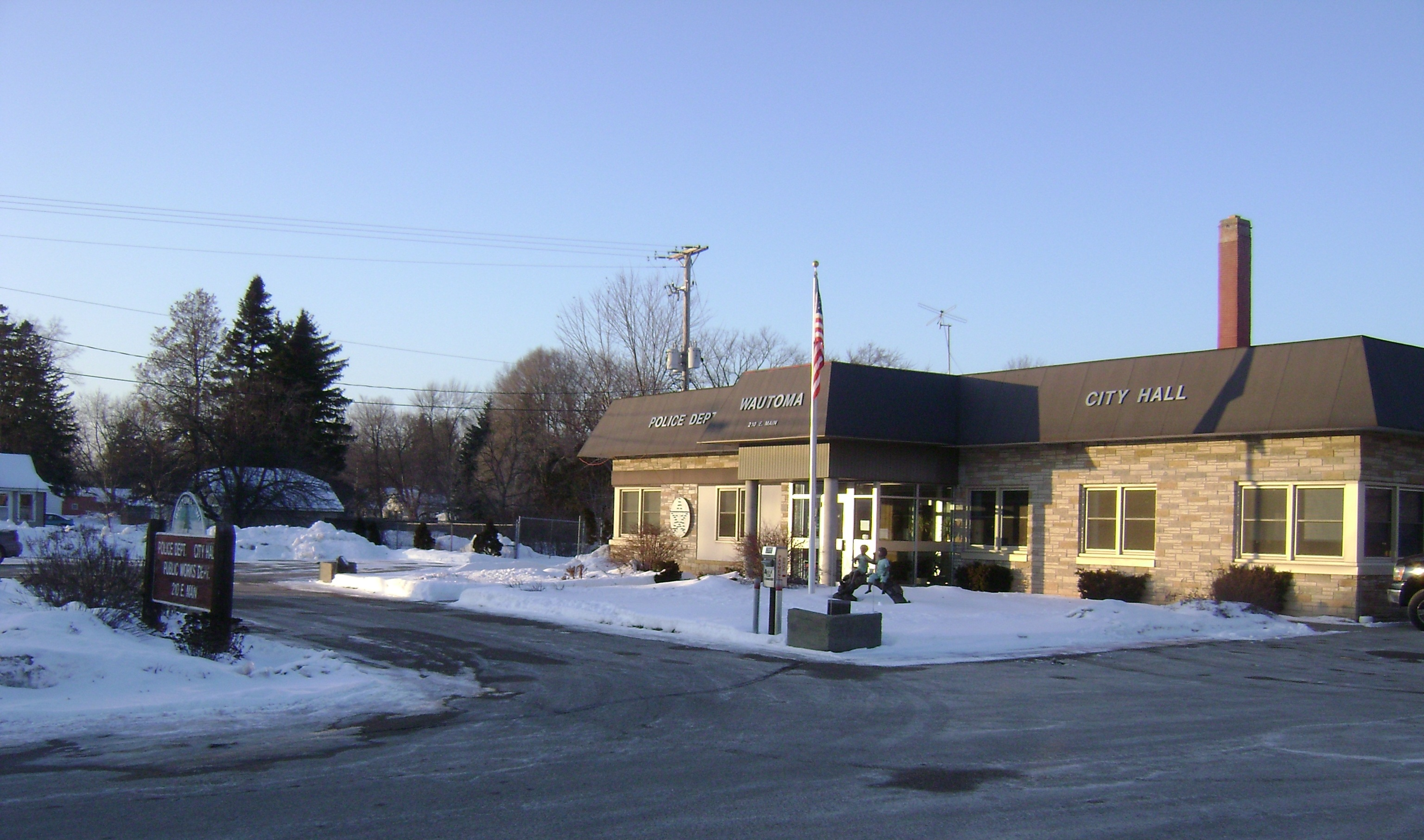
Wautoma City Hall

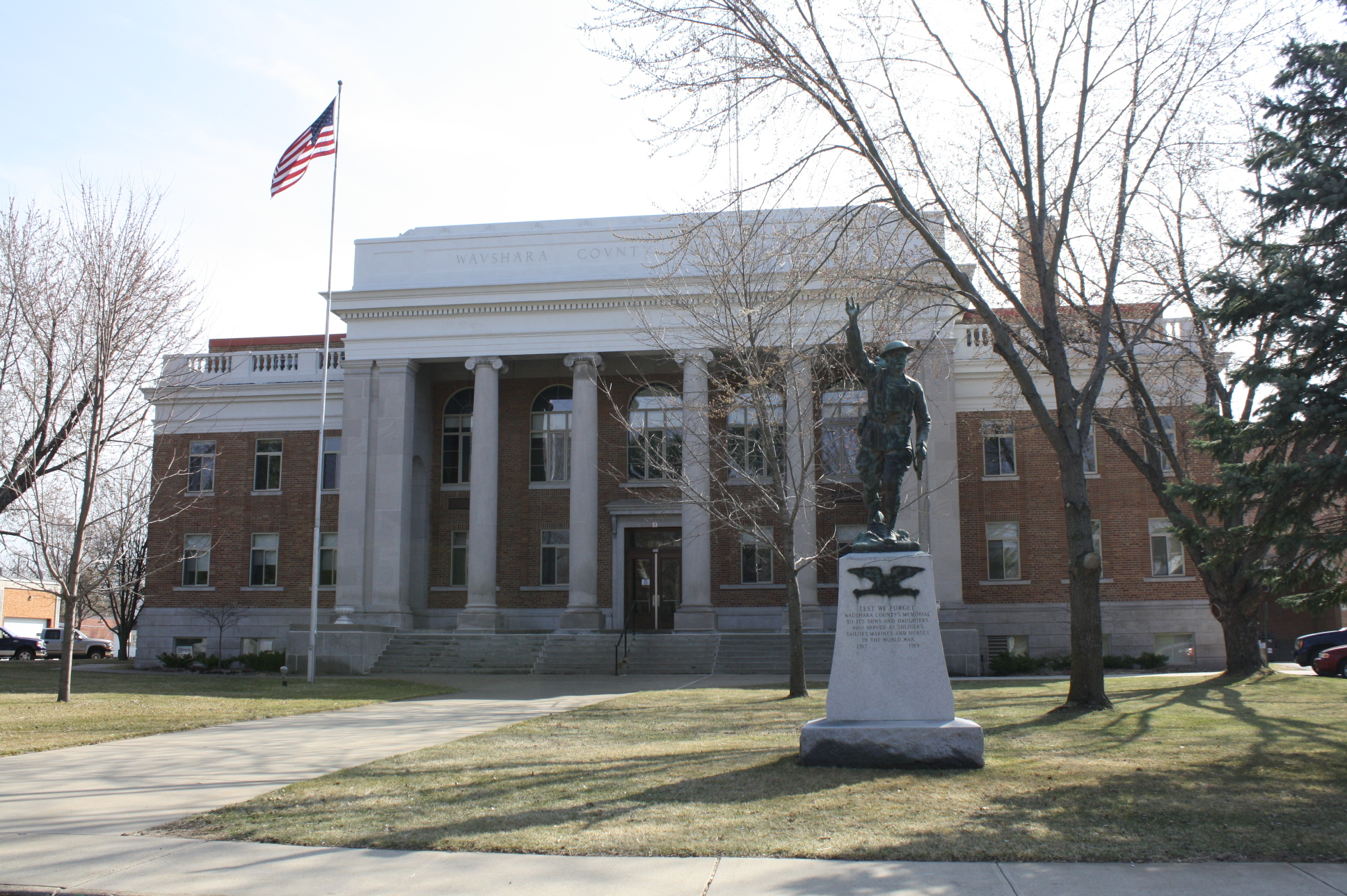
Waushara County courthouse

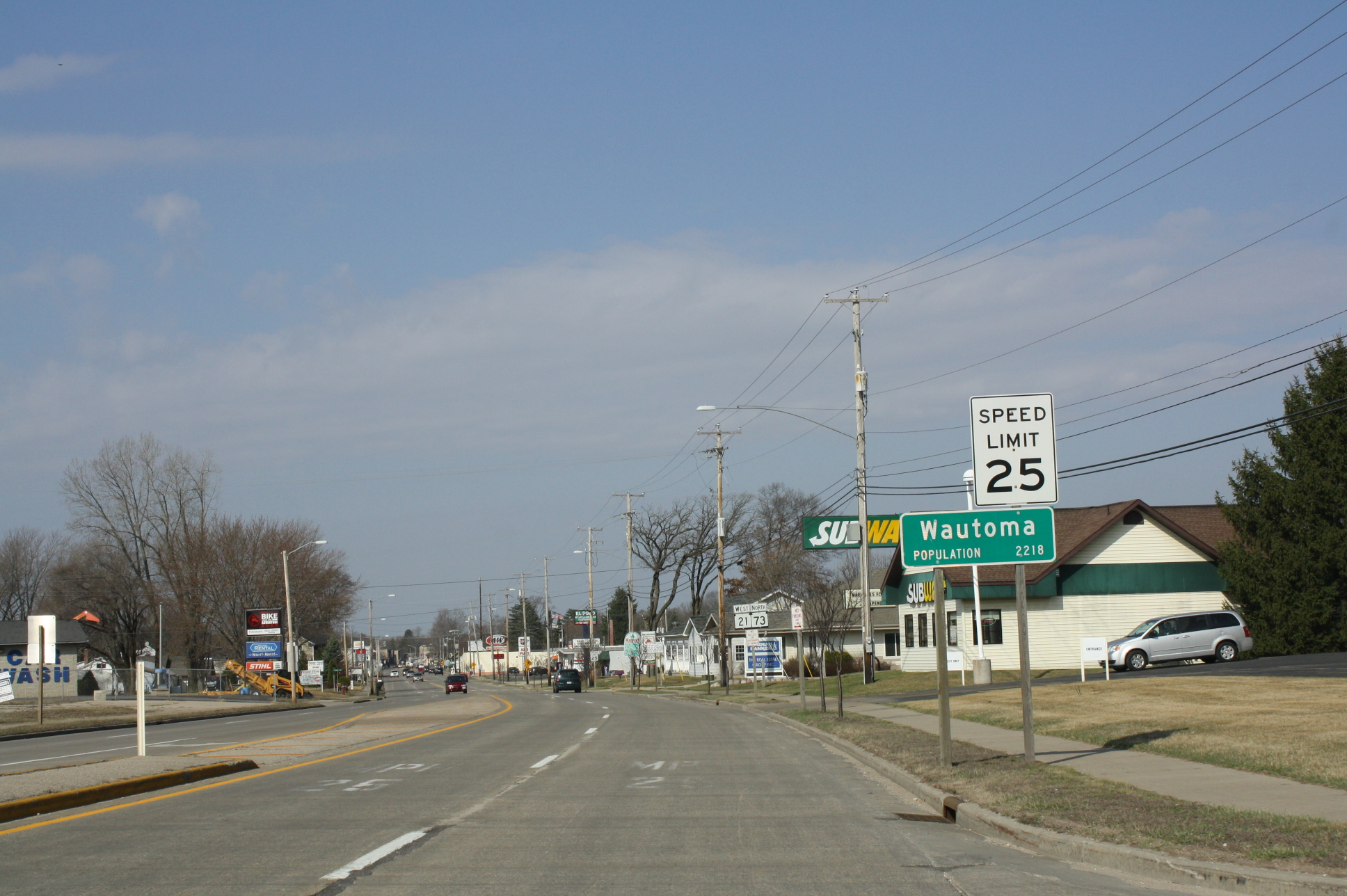
Looking west at the sign for Wautoma

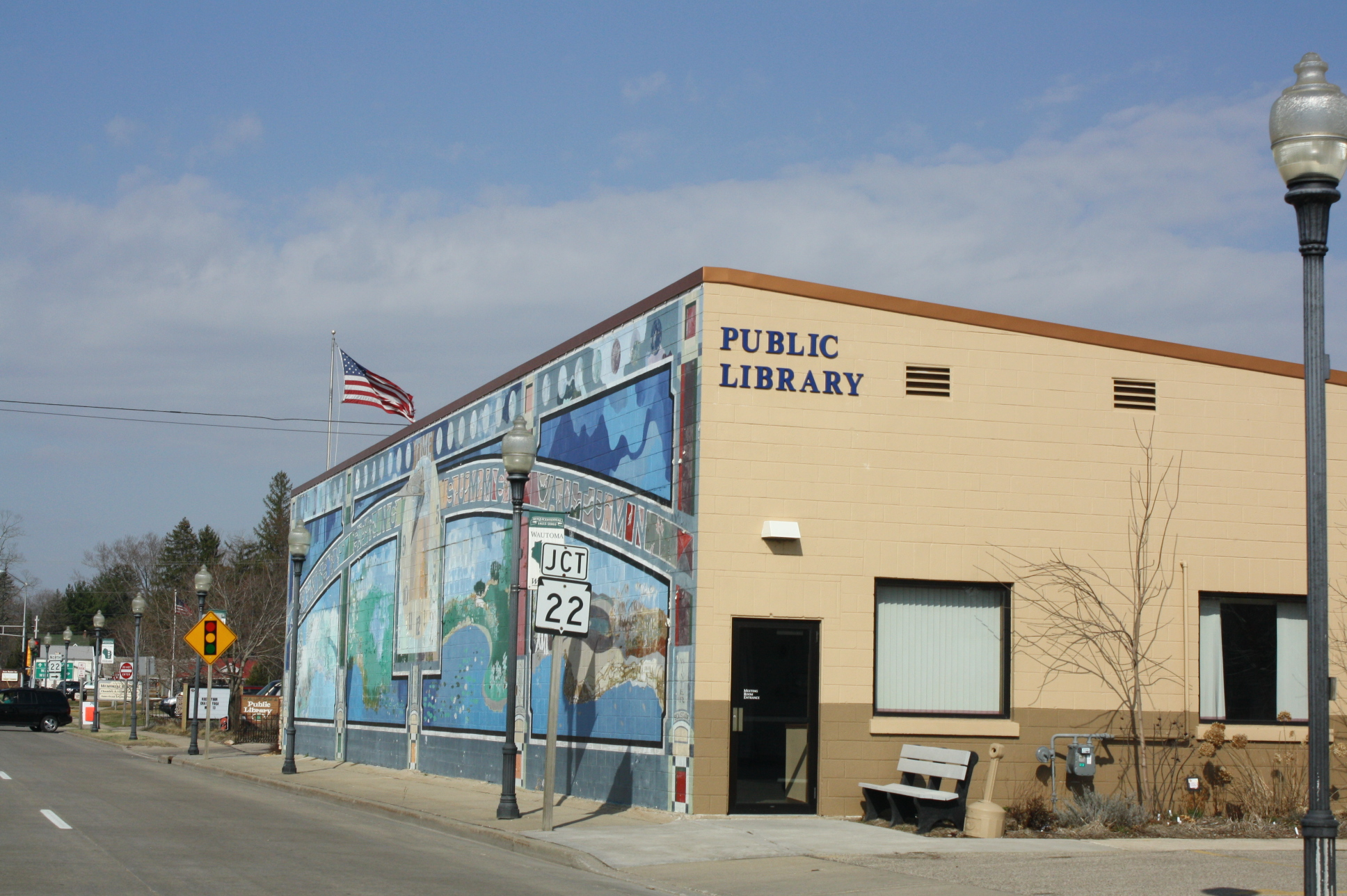
Public library

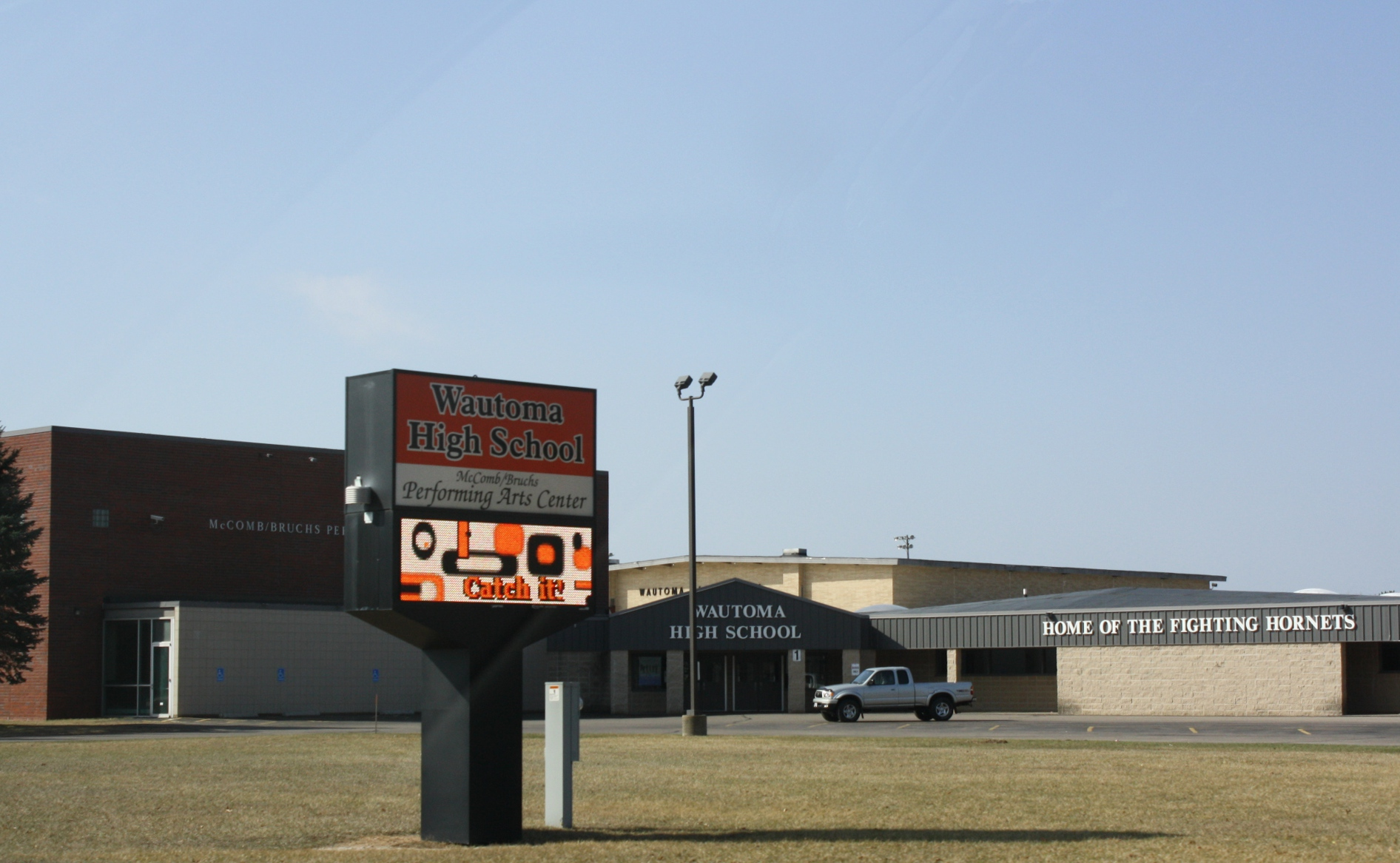
Wautoma High School

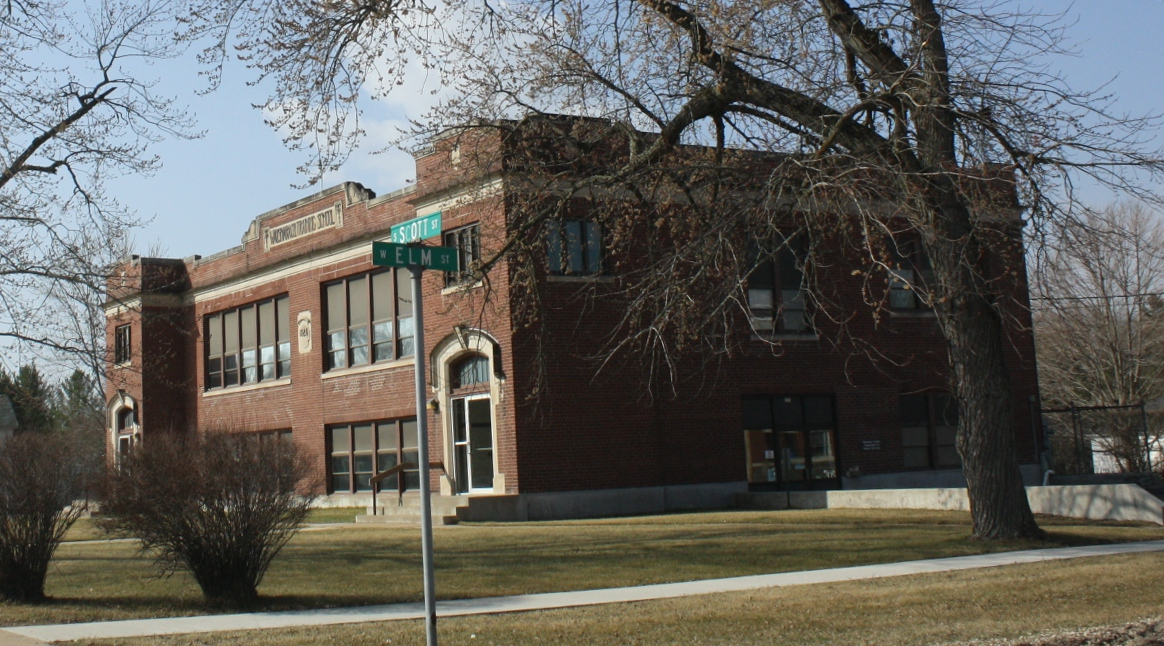
The former Waushara Training School in Wautoma

== See also ==
- List of cities in Wisconsin
