= Arthur F. Odlin =

American judge

- Born: April 25, 1860; Concord, New Hampshire, U.S.
- Died: June 7, 1926 (aged 66); Jacksonville, Florida, U.S.

Arthur Fuller Odlin (April 25, 1860 – June 7, 1926) was a judge of the United States courts in the Philippines and in Puerto Rico.

Born and raised in Concord, New Hampshire, Arthur was a son of Woodbridge and Abby P. Odlin. In 1883, he worked as a baseball umpire in the National League. He attended Dartmouth College, Amherst College, and was part of Boston University School of Law’s class of 1885. He married October 5, 1886, to Mary Emma Allen of Lancaster, New Hampshire. After practicing law in Massachusetts, Ohio, and Orlando, Florida, Odlin was appointed Attorney General of Puerto Rico after the United States acquired the island following the Spanish–American War.

From 1901 to 1904, Odlin was a judge of the Court of First Instance in Manila in the then-U.S. controlled Philippine Islands, reportedly the first court to be created in the Philippines under U.S. rule. Odlin then returned to private practice, participating in several cases before the United States Supreme Court.

In 1921, President Warren G. Harding selected Odlin to serve as Judge of the United States District Court for the District of Puerto Rico. Odlin served a single four-year term as the sole federal judge in Puerto Rico. He left office in 1925 and died in Jacksonville, Florida, the following year. His successor in office was Ira K. Wells.

Preceded by Peter J. Hamilton	Judge, United States District Court for the District of Puerto Rico; 1921–1925	Succeeded by Ira K. Wells
