= June Wandrey =

First Lieutenant in the U.S. Army Nurse Corps

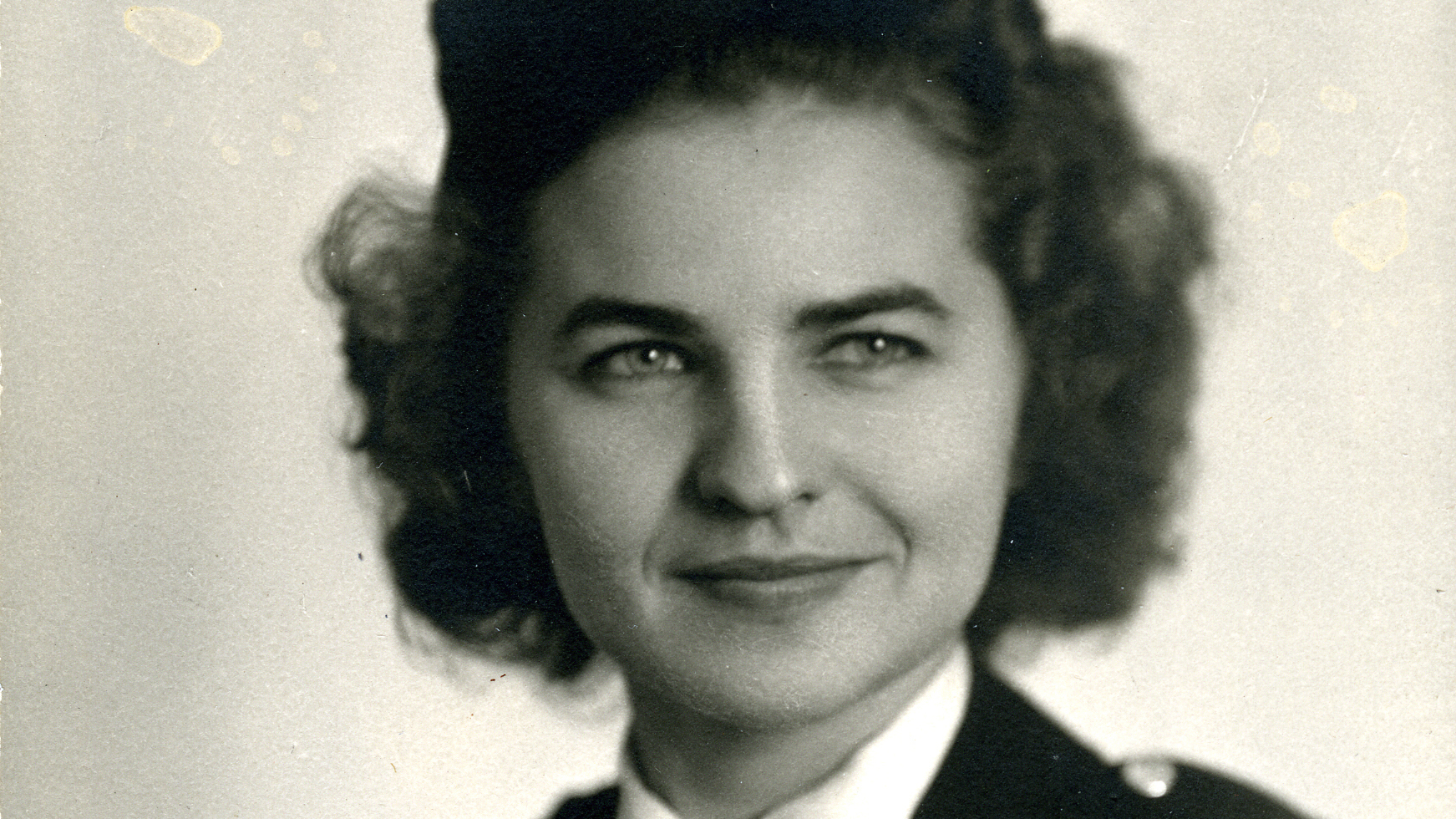
- Born: June Wandrey; June 25, 1920; Wautoma, Wisconsin
- Died: November 27, 2005 (aged 85) Oregon, Ohio
- Allegiance: United States
- Branch: United States Army Nurse Corps; Women's Army Corps (US)
- Service years: 1942–1946
- Conflicts: World War II

June Wandrey Mann (June 25, 1920 – November 27, 2005) was a First Lieutenant in the U.S. Army Nurse Corps from Wautoma, Wisconsin. She was the author of Bedpan Commando, an account of her military service in Africa, Sicily, Italy, France and Germany from 1942 to 1946, during which she was awarded eight battle stars.

Mann's book garnered significant public and media attention, leading to numerous television, radio and personal appearances, including on The Larry King Show, NBC Nightly News and Paul Harvey's The Rest of the Story, among others.

On June 22, 1995, Mann met with President Bill Clinton in Nettuno, Italy, as part of celebrations to commemorate the 50th anniversary of the Anzio beachhead invasion.

She was a life member of numerous veterans' associations, including the Disabled American Veterans, the Veterans of Foreign Wars, Anzio Beachhead Association, 36th Inf. Div., 3rd Inf. Div., and the 10th & 40th Combat Engineers.

She was also featured in the History Channel TV series World War II In HD. Amy Smart provided the voice over for June Wandrey.

June Wandrey Mann died at St. Charles-Mercy Hospital in Oregon, Ohio, on November 27, 2005, at the age of 85.
