= John J. Jenkins =

American judge and politician (1843–1911)

The Honorable John J. Jenkins
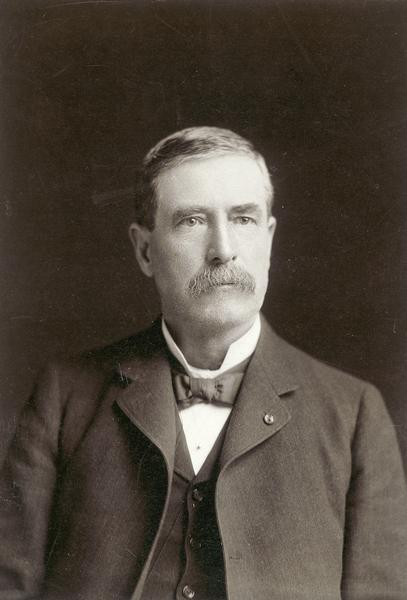

United States District Judge for the District of Puerto Rico
- In office May 1910 – June 10, 1911
- Appointed by: William Howard Taft
- Preceded by: Bernard Shandon Rodey
- Succeeded by: Paul Charlton

Chair of the U.S. House Committee on the Judiciary
- In office March 4, 1903 – March 3, 1909
- Preceded by: George W. Ray
- Succeeded by: Richard W. Parker

Member of the U.S. House of Representatives from Wisconsin
- In office March 4, 1895 – March 3, 1909
- Preceded by: Nils P. Haugen (10th); District established (11th)
- Succeeded by: Webster E. Brown (10th); Irvine Lenroot (11th)
- Constituency: 10th district (1895-1903); 11th district (1903-09)

United States Attorney for the Territory of Wyoming
- In office March 1, 1876 – 1880
- President: Ulysses S. Grant; Rutherford B. Hayes
- Preceded by: Joseph M. Carey
- Succeeded by: Anthony C. Campbell

County Judge of Chippewa County, Wisconsin
- In office July 1872 – March 1, 1876
- Appointed by: Cadwallader C. Washburn
- Preceded by: William R. Hoyt
- Succeeded by: Roujet D. Marshall

Member of the Wisconsin State Assembly from the Chippewa district
- In office January 1, 1872 – April 1872
- Preceded by: James A. Bate (Chippewa–Dunn)
- Succeeded by: Albert Pound

Personal details
- Born: August 24, 1843 Weymouth, Dorsetshire, England, U.K.
- Died: June 10, 1911 (aged 67) Chippewa Falls, Wisconsin, U.S.
- Resting place: Forest Hill Cemetery, Chippewa Falls, Wisconsin
- Party: Republican
- Spouse: Esther M. Thompson (m. 1866–1911)
- Children: Francis W. Jenkins; (b. 1869; died 1961)

Military service
- Allegiance: United States
- Branch/service: United States Army; Union Army
- Years of service: 1861–1865
- Rank: Private, USV
- Unit: 6th Reg. Wis. Vol. Infantry
- Battles/wars: American Civil War

John James Jenkins (August 24, 1843 – June 10, 1911) was an English American immigrant, lawyer, judge, and Republican politician. He served seven terms as a member of the United States House of Representatives, representing northwest Wisconsin, and served one year as United States district judge for the District of Puerto Rico.

== Early life ==
John Jenkins was born in Weymouth, Dorsetshire, England. He emigrated with his parents at age 8, first settling in Sauk County, Wisconsin, then relocating in 1852 to Baraboo, Wisconsin.

== Civil War service ==
At the outbreak of the American Civil War, Jenkins, then seventeen years old, volunteered for service with the Union Army against his parents' wishes. He was enrolled as a private in Company A of the 6th Wisconsin Infantry Regiment. The 6th Wisconsin Infantry was a component of the Iron Brigade of the Army of the Potomac throughout the war, and Jenkins participated in nearly all the regiment's marches and battles, including Gainesville, Antietam, Gettysburg, and Ulysses S. Grant's Overland Campaign. His three-year enlistment was due to expire in May 1864, but he re-enlisted as a veteran in January. He was discharged due to disability on February 27, 1865.

== Postbellum career ==
After the war, Jenkins returned to Baraboo and was employed as a raftsman on the Wisconsin River, running timber from Germantown and Grand Rapids to St. Louis. In 1867, he was elected as Sauk County court clerk for the Wisconsin circuit court, and was re-elected in 1869. He read law in his spare time, without the assistance of a teacher, and was admitted to the State Bar of Wisconsin in July 1870. He resigned as court clerk in October 1870 and moved to Chippewa Falls. There, he became the junior partner in a law partnership with James M. Bingham, known as Bingham & Jenkins, and was elected city attorney of Chippewa Falls in 1871.

Later that year, he stood as the Republican candidate for Wisconsin State Assembly in the new Chippewa County district (Chippewa had previously shared a district with Dunn County). In the Fall election, he won with 56% of the vote. In the Assembly, he served on the committee on incorporations.

The 1872 session ended in March, and later that year, Jenkins was appointed County Judge of Chippewa County by Governor Cadwallader C. Washburn. He was elected to a full term in 1873, but resigned in 1876 after he was appointed United States Attorney for the Wyoming Territory by U.S. President Ulysses S. Grant. He served a four-year term as U.S. Attorney, returning to Chippewa Falls in 1880 and resuming his law practice.

== Congress and judiciary ==
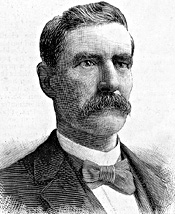
Sketch of a younger John J. Jenkins.

In 1894, four-term incumbent congressman Nils P. Haugen announced he would not seek another term. The Republican district convention nominated Jenkins on the first ballot as their candidate in Wisconsin's 10th congressional district. He won the Fall general election with 58% of the vote.

He served as a Representative from that district for the 54th through the 57th congresses. In the 1900 United States census, Wisconsin gained another congressional seat, and in the subsequent redistricting, Jenkins was drawn into the new 11th Congressional District. In that district, Jenkins was elected to another three terms, serving in the 58th, 59th, and 60th congresses. He also served as Chairman of the House Judiciary Committee during those three terms.

In 1908, he was defeated in the Republican primary by Irvine Lenroot. Jenkins was a casualty of the Republican internecine conflict between conservatives and progressives. Lenroot was a progressive and a close friend of Robert M. La Follette, the leader of the Progressive Republicans in Wisconsin and an unsuccessful candidate for the Republican nomination for President in 1908. Lenroot accused Jenkins of being a tool of the reactionary old-guard Republicans, due to his close association with House Speaker Joseph Gurney Cannon. Lenroot was also assisted in his campaign by an alliance with the Prohibition Party. Lenroot ultimately carried the primary by about 6,000 votes and went on to win the general election, succeeding Jenkins.

Jenkins returned for one final public service in 1910, when President William Howard Taft appointed him to serve a four-year term as United States district judge for Puerto Rico. Jenkins assumed that post in May 1910 but became ill and was unable to perform much judicial work. In April 1911, he requested a two-month leave-of-absence to return to Wisconsin and recuperate. He died on June 10, 1911, at his home in Chippewa Falls, and was succeeded by Paul Charlton.

Wisconsin State Assembly
| Preceded by James A. Bate (Chippewa–Dunn) | Member of the Wisconsin State Assembly from the Chippewa district January 1, 1872 – January 6, 1873 | Succeeded by Albert Pound |
U.S. House of Representatives
| Preceded by Nils P. Haugen | Member of the U.S. House of Representatives from Wisconsin's 10th congressional district March 4, 1895 – March 4, 1903 | Succeeded by Webster E. Brown |
| District created | Member of the U.S. House of Representatives from Wisconsin's 11th congressional district March 4, 1903 – March 4, 1909 | Succeeded by Irvine Lenroot |
| Preceded by George W. Ray; New York | Chairman of the House Judiciary Committee; March 4, 1903 – March 4, 1909 | Succeeded by Richard W. Parker; New Jersey |
Legal offices
| Preceded by William R. Hoyt | County Judge of Chippewa County, Wisconsin; July 1872 – March 1, 1876 | Succeeded by Roujet D. Marshall |
| Preceded by Joseph M. Carey | United States Attorney for the Territory of Wyoming; March 1, 1876 – 1880 | Succeeded by Anthony C. Campbell |
| Preceded by Bernard Shandon Rodey | United States District Judge for the District of Puerto Rico; 1910–1911 | Succeeded by Paul Charlton |
