= List of United States Supreme Court cases, volume 229 =

Supreme Court of the United States
- Interactive map of Supreme Court of the United States
- 38°53′26″N 77°00′16″W
- Established: March 4, 1789; 236 years ago
- Location: Washington, D.C.
- Coordinates: 38°53′26″N 77°00′16″W
- Composition method: Presidential nomination with Senate confirmation
- Authorised by: Constitution of the United States, Art. III, § 1
- Judge term length: life tenure, subject to impeachment and removal
- Number of positions: 9 (by statute)
- Website: supremecourt.gov

This is a list of cases reported in volume 229 of United States Reports, decided by the Supreme Court of the United States in 1913.

== Justices of the Supreme Court at the time of volume 229 U.S. ==
The Supreme Court is established by Article III, Section 1 of the Constitution of the United States, which says: "The judicial Power of the United States, shall be vested in one supreme Court . . .". The size of the Court is not specified; the Constitution leaves it to Congress to set the number of justices. Under the Judiciary Act of 1789 Congress originally fixed the number of justices at six (one chief justice and five associate justices). Since 1789 Congress has varied the size of the Court from six to seven, nine, ten, and back to nine justices (always including one chief justice).

When the cases in volume 229 were decided the Court comprised the following nine members:

Portrait	Justice	Office	Home State	Succeeded	Date confirmed by the Senate (Vote)	Tenure on Supreme Court
	Edward Douglass White	Chief Justice	Louisiana	Melville Fuller	December 12, 1910 (Acclamation)	December 19, 1910 – May 19, 1921 (Died)
	Joseph McKenna	Associate Justice	California	Stephen Johnson Field	January 21, 1898 (Acclamation)	January 26, 1898 – January 5, 1925 (Retired)
	Oliver Wendell Holmes Jr.	Associate Justice	Massachusetts	Horace Gray	December 4, 1902 (Acclamation)	December 8, 1902 – January 12, 1932 (Retired)
	William R. Day	Associate Justice	Ohio	George Shiras Jr.	February 23, 1903 (Acclamation)	March 2, 1903 – November 13, 1922 (Retired)
	Horace Harmon Lurton	Associate Justice	Tennessee	Rufus W. Peckham	December 20, 1909 (Acclamation)	January 3, 1910 – July 12, 1914 (Died)
	Charles Evans Hughes	Associate Justice	New York	David Josiah Brewer	May 2, 1910 (Acclamation)	October 10, 1910 – June 10, 1916 (Resigned)
	Willis Van Devanter	Associate Justice	Wyoming	Edward Douglass White (as Associate Justice)	December 15, 1910 (Acclamation)	January 3, 1911 – June 2, 1937 (Retired)
	Joseph Rucker Lamar	Associate Justice	Georgia	William Henry Moody	December 15, 1910 (Acclamation)	January 3, 1911 – January 2, 1916 (Died)
	Mahlon Pitney	Associate Justice	New Jersey	John Marshall Harlan	March 13, 1912 (50–26)	March 18, 1912 – December 31, 1922 (Resigned)

== Citation style ==
Under the Judiciary Act of 1789 the federal court structure at the time comprised District Courts, which had general trial jurisdiction; Circuit Courts, which had mixed trial and appellate (from the US District Courts) jurisdiction; and the United States Supreme Court, which had appellate jurisdiction over the federal District and Circuit courts—and for certain issues over state courts. The Supreme Court also had limited original jurisdiction (i.e., in which cases could be filed directly with the Supreme Court without first having been heard by a lower federal or state court). There were one or more federal District Courts and/or Circuit Courts in each state, territory, or other geographical region.

The Judiciary Act of 1891 created the United States Courts of Appeals and reassigned the jurisdiction of most routine appeals from the district and circuit courts to these appellate courts. The Act created nine new courts that were originally known as the "United States Circuit Courts of Appeals." The new courts had jurisdiction over most appeals of lower court decisions. The Supreme Court could review either legal issues that a court of appeals certified or decisions of court of appeals by writ of certiorari.

On January 1, 1912, the effective date of the Judicial Code of 1911, the old Circuit Courts were abolished, with their remaining trial court jurisdiction transferred to the U.S. District Courts.

Bluebook citation style is used for case names, citations, and jurisdictions.

- "# Cir." = United States Court of Appeals
  - e.g., "3d Cir." = United States Court of Appeals for the Third Circuit
- "C.C.D." = United States Circuit Court for the District of . . .
  - e.g.,"C.C.D.N.J." = United States Circuit Court for the District of New Jersey
- "D." = United States District Court for the District of . . .
  - e.g.,"D. Mass." = United States District Court for the District of Massachusetts
- "E." = Eastern; "M." = Middle; "N." = Northern; "S." = Southern; "W." = Western
  - e.g.,"C.C.S.D.N.Y." = United States Circuit Court for the Southern District of New York
  - e.g.,"M.D. Ala." = United States District Court for the Middle District of Alabama
- "Ct. Cl." = United States Court of Claims
- The abbreviation of a state's name alone indicates the highest appellate court in that state's judiciary at the time.
  - e.g.,"Pa." = Supreme Court of Pennsylvania
  - e.g.,"Me." = Supreme Judicial Court of Maine

== List of cases in volume 229 U.S. ==
Case Name	Page and year	Opinion of the Court	Concurring opinion(s)	Dissenting opinion(s)	Lower Court	Disposition
Bauer and Cie v. O'Donnell	1 (1913)	Day	none	none	D.C. Cir.	certification
Gorman v. Littlefield	19 (1913)	Day	none	none	2d Cir.	reversed
Barrett v. Indiana	26 (1913)	Day	none	none	Ind.	affirmed
Big Vein Coal Company of West Virginia v. Read	31 (1913)	Day	none	none	C.C.N.D.W. Va.	affirmed
Detroit United Railway Company v. City of Detroit	39 (1913)	Day	none	none	Mich.	affirmed
Barry v. United States	47 (1913)	Lurton	none	none	Ct. Cl.	affirmed
United States v. Chandler-Dunbar Water Power Company	53 (1913)	Lurton	none	none	W.D. Mich.	reversed
Lewis Blue Point Oyster Cultivation Company v. Briggs	82 (1913)	Lurton	none	none	N.Y. Sup. Ct.	affirmed
Shelton v. King	90 (1913)	Lurton	none	none	D.C. Cir.	affirmed
Chicago, Rock Island and Pacific Railroad Company v. Dowell	102 (1913)	Lurton	none	none	Kan.	affirmed
Norfolk and Western Railway Company v. Earnest	114 (1913)	VanDevanter	none	none	C.C.W.D. Va.	affirmed
City and County of Denver v. New York Trust Company	123 (1913)	VanDevanter	none	none	8th Cir.	reversed
Pedersen v. Delaware, Lackawanna and Western Railroad Company	146 (1913)	VanDevanter	none	Lamar	3d Cir.	reversed
St. Louis, San Francisco and Texas Railway Company v. Seale	156 (1913)	VanDevanter	none	none	Tex. Civ. App.	reversed
Degge v. Hitchcock	162 (1913)	Lamar	none	none	D.C. Cir.	affirmed
Mackay v. Uinta Development Company	173 (1913)	Lamar	none	none	8th Cir.	certification
Texas and Pacific Railway Company v. Prater	177 (1913)	Lamar	none	none	5th Cir.	affirmed
First National Bank v. Keys	179 (1913)	Lamar	none	none	Okla.	affirmed
Swigart v. Baker	187 (1913)	Lamar	none	none	9th Cir.	reversed
Dill v. Ebey	199 (1913)	Pitney	none	none	Okla.	dismissed
Morse v. United States	208 (1913)	Pitney	none	none	Ct. Cl.	affirmed
Citizens National Bank v. Davisson	212 (1913)	Pitney	none	none	N.M.	affirmed
United States v. Wright	226 (1913)	Pitney	none	none	E.D. Okla.	reversed
United States v. Shelley	239 (1913)	Pitney	none	none	S.D.N.Y.	affirmed
United States v. Baltimore and Ohio Railroad Company	244 (1913)	White	none	none	C.C.N.D.W. Va.	affirmed
Robertson v. Howard	254 (1913)	White	none	none	Kan.	reversed
St. Louis, Iron Mountain and Southern Railway Company v. McWhirter	265 (1913)	White	none	Pitney	Ky.	reversed
Lewis Publishing Company v. Morgan	288 (1913)	White	none	none	S.D.N.Y.	affirmed
Chicago, Rock Island and Pacific Railroad Company v. Brown	317 (1913)	McKenna	none	none	7th Cir.	affirmed
Citizens' Telephone Company v. Fuller I	322 (1913)	McKenna	none	none	C.C.W.D. Mich.	affirmed
Citizens' Telephone Company v. Fuller II	335 (1913)	McKenna	none	none	C.C.W.D. Mich.	affirmed
Louisiana Railroad Commission v. Texas and Pacific Railroad Company	336 (1913)	McKenna	none	none	5th Cir.	affirmed
Wheeler v. City and County of Denver	342 (1913)	McKenna	none	none	C.C.D. Colo.	reversed
Adams v. Russell	353 (1913)	McKenna	none	none	Mich.	dismissed
McGovern v. City of New York	363 (1913)	Holmes	none	none	N.Y. Sup. Ct.	affirmed
Nash v. United States	373 (1913)	Holmes	none	none	5th Cir.	reversed
United States v. Adams Exchange Company	381 (1913)	Holmes	none	none	S.D. Ohio	reversed
National Safe Deposit, Savings and Trust Company v. Hibbs	391 (1913)	Day	none	none	D.C. Cir.	affirmed
Portland Railway Light and Power Company v. Railroad Commission of Oregon I	397 (1913)	Day	none	none	Or.	affirmed
Portland Railway Light and Power Company v. Railroad Commission of Oregon II	414 (1913)	Day	none	none	Or.	affirmed
MacLeod v. United States	416 (1913)	Day	none	none	Ct. Cl.	reversed
Continental and Commercial Trust and Savings Bank v. Chicago Title & Trust Company	435 (1913)	Day	none	none	7th Cir.	reversed
Charlton v. Kelly, Sheriff of Hudson County, New Jersey	447 (1913)	Lurton	none	none	C.C.D.N.J.	affirmed
Paducah v. East Tennessee Telephone Company	476 (1913)	Lurton	none	none	C.C.W.D. Ky.	dismissed
Singer Sewing Machine Company v. Benedict	481 (1913)	VanDevanter	none	none	8th Cir.	affirmed
Bond v. Unknown Heirs of Barela	488 (1913)	VanDevanter	none	none	N.M.	affirmed
National Home for Disabled Volunteer Soldiers v. Parrish	494 (1913)	VanDevanter	none	none	6th Cir.	affirmed
United States v. Mille Lac Band of Chippewa Indians	498 (1913)	VanDevanter	none	none	Ct. Cl.	reversed
Chicago, Burlington and Quincy Railroad Company v. Hall	511 (1913)	Lamar	none	none	Neb.	affirmed
American National Bank of Nashville v. Miller	517 (1913)	Lamar	none	none	6th Cir.	affirmed
Studley v. Boylston National Bank	523 (1913)	Lamar	none	none	1st Cir.	affirmed
Camp v. Boyd	530 (1913)	Pitney	none	none	D.C. Cir.	affirmed
Campbell v. Northwest Eckington Improvement Company	561 (1913)	Pitney	none	none	D.C. Cir.	reversed
Lem Woon v. Oregon	586 (1913)	Pitney	none	none	Or.	affirmed
Wilkinson v. McKimmie	590 (1913)	Pitney	none	none	D.C. Cir.	affirmed
District of Columbia v. Petty	593 (1913)	Pitney	none	none	D.C. Cir.	affirmed
