= Wautoma Municipal Airport =

Airport in Wisconsin, United States

- IATA: none; ICAO: none; FAA LID: Y50

Summary
- Airport type: Public
- Owner: City of Wautoma
- Serves: Wautoma, Wisconsin
- Opened: October 1947
- Time zone: CST (UTC−06:00)
  - Summer (DST): CDT (UTC−05:00)
- Elevation AMSL: 859 ft (262 m)
- Coordinates: 44°02′35″N 089°18′20″W

Map
- Location of airport in Wisconsin Y50 (the United States)

Runways
Direction	Length		Surface
Direction	ft	m	Surface
13/31	3,300	1,006	Asphalt
8/26	2,334	711	Turf

Statistics
- Aircraft operations (2021): 12,400
- Based aircraft (2024): 37
- Source: Federal Aviation Administration

Wautoma Municipal Airport, (FAA LID: Y50) is a city owned public use airport located 2 miles (3 km) southwest of the central business district of Wautoma, Wisconsin, a city in Waushara County, Wisconsin, United States. It is included in the Federal Aviation Administration (FAA) National Plan of Integrated Airport Systems for 2025–2029, in which it is categorized as a local general aviation facility. The airport is home to EAA chapter 1331.

Although most airports in the United States use the same three-letter location identifier for the FAA and International Air Transport Association (IATA), this airport is assigned Y50 by the FAA but has no designation from the IATA.

== Facilities and aircraft ==
Wautoma Municipal Airport covers an area of 353 acres (143 ha) at an elevation of 859 feet (262 m) above mean sea level. It has two runways: 13/31 is 3,300 by 60 feet (1,006 x 18 m) with an asphalt surface and 8/26 is 2,334 by 120 feet (711 x 37 m) with a turf surface.

For the 12-month period ending May 20, 2021, the airport had 12,400 aircraft operations, an average of 34 aircraft operations per day: 97% general aviation, 2% air taxi and 1% military.

In June 2024, there were 37 aircraft based at this airport: 36 single-engine and 1 multi-engine.

== See also ==
- List of airports in Wisconsin
