= Peter J. Hamilton =

American judge

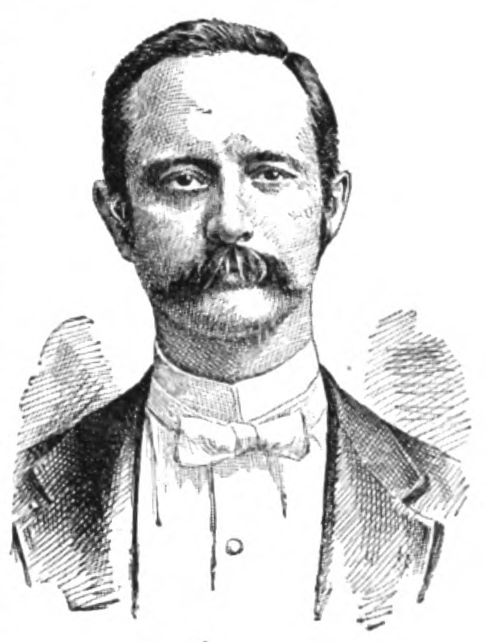

Mobile, Alabama City Council
- In office 1891–1894

Judge of the United States District Court for the District of Puerto Rico
- In office 1913–1921
- Appointed by: Woodrow Wilson
- Preceded by: Paul Charlton
- Succeeded by: Arthur Odlin

Personal details
- Born: Peter Joseph Hamilton; March 19, 1859 Mobile, Alabama, U.S.
- Died: July 13, 1927 (aged 68) Anniston, Alabama, U.S.
- Spouse: Rachel Burgett
- Children: son, 2 daughters
- Education: University of Leipzig; University of Alabama Law School
- Alma mater: Princeton University (B.A., M.A.)
- Occupation: historian
- Profession: attorney, professor
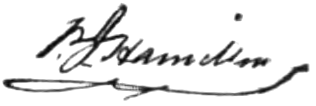
- Signature

Peter Joseph Hamilton (March 19, 1859 – July 13, 1927) was an Alabama lawyer, politician, professor and historian who served on the Mobile City Council and as Mobile City Attorney, as well as a judge of the United States District Court for the District of Puerto Rico from 1913 to 1921.

== Early and family life ==
Hamilton was born in Mobile, Alabama to a lawyer and his wife. His mother died when he was two years old. Hanikrob attended Towle's Institute in Mobile, then a boarding school in Pennsylvania. Admitted to Princeton University, he graduated with a bachelor's degree with honors in 1879, and with a master's degree in 1882. Meanwhile, he received a fellowship and studied at the University of Leipzig before returning to his home city and graduating first in his class at the University of Alabama Law School in 1882.

He married Rachel Burgett in 1891, and the couple traveled in Europe. They had a son (who died as a child) and two daughters. Active in Mobile society, Hamilton was a member of the Order of Myths as well as the Strikers Independent Society and the Mobile Rifle Company's drill team.

== Career ==
After admission to the Alabama bar, Hamilton practiced law with his father's and uncle's prestigious firm. When his father suffered a stroke in 1885, Hamilton assisted Robert C. Brickell, the Chief Justice of the Alabama Supreme Court in preparing a digest of Alabama laws. His uncle Thomas Hamilton retired from the firm in 1894, which proved a critical year in Hamilton's life, because of his young son's death as well as own career transitions. Hamilton later helped codify Mobile's city ordinances in 1897.

Hamilton's first book, Rambles in Historic Lands, related his travels while in college and after marrying his wife. He later helped found the Iberville Historical Society as well as serve on the Alabama Historical Commission

In 1891, Hamilton secured his first elective office, on the Mobile City Council. After serving for three years, he became the city attorney, as well as published his first history book, Art Work of Mobile and Vicinity (1894). His civic duties allowed him to work on his historical studies as well, so he published Colonial Mobile: An Historical Study (1897) (the first detailed relation of his native city's past, a revised edition of which was also later published), Early Southern Institutions (1898), The Colonization of the South (1904), The Reconstruction Period (1910), and Mobile of the Five Flags (1913) (a high school textbook).

Hamilton, a Democrat, was appointed as the federal judge for Puerto Rico in 1913 by President Woodrow Wilson, who was his classmate at Princeton University. (Hamilton actually was first nominated by outgoing President William Howard Taft, but it appears that this was a courtesy nomination on Wilson's behalf.) During World War I, Hamilton's wife and daughter were on a ship sunk by a German U-Boat off the New Jersey Coast, but were rescued from their lifeboat after two days.

Hamilton served two four-year terms as District Judge in Puerto Rico, obtaining reappointment from President Wilson in 1917, but not reappointment by President Warren G. Harding despite presenting a 5,000 resident petition urging his re-nomination. Throughout his tenure, Hamilton was a strong proponent of bringing Puerto Rico under greater influence by the United States, and supported increased use of the English language in Puerto Rico. At one point, questions were raised concerning Hamilton's personal finances and any effect they might be having on his judicial service. An investigation by the U.S. Justice Department failed to sustain the allegations.

Hamilton tried to enhance his court's public reputation and improved its administration, keeping more current with the docket than had his predecessors. During his tenure he addressed the political status of Puerto Rico and issues relating to citizenship, and handled numerous commercial and criminal cases.

At times, Hamilton's relations with Puerto Rico's governor Arthur Yager proved tense, although President Wilson had nominated both. Some local lawyers resented the federal court in Puerto Rico, which led to several unsuccessful attempts to induce the United States Congress to abolish the court. On the other hand, efforts by Hamilton to obtain life tenure for judges of the federal court in Puerto Rico, as is required for Article III federal courts, were also unsuccessful (that step was not ultimately taken until 1966).

In 1921, President Harding, a Republican, declined to reappoint Hamilton to a third term. He was succeeded by Arthur Odlin.

After leaving the bench, Hamilton remained in Puerto Rico for several years. In addition to practicing law and continuing his travels in Europe and the Middle East, Hamilton taught law at the University of Puerto Rico. In 1922 he published Origin and Growth of the Common Law in England and America. He also wrote a series of articles for the Harvard Law Review comparing the common law and civil law systems, as well as an article on Puerto Rican folklore.

As Hamilton and his wife developed health issues, they moved back to the mainland. Hamilton briefly taught law and was dean of the Southern Methodist University School of Law in Dallas, Texas.

== Death and legacy ==
Hamilton lived his final years with his daughter and her family in Anniston, Alabama. He died on July 13, 1927. During his lifetime, he had presented bound copies of his articles to the Mobile Public Library. That library and the Alabama Department of Archives and History were to receive his notes and research files, but a fire destroyed them before delivery. Thus, only Hamilton's published books and articles and some correspondence can be found in those archives as well as in Puerto Rico.

Although no full-length biography of Hamilton exists, his daughter, Rachel Duke Hamilton, and Puerto Rican historian Carmelo Delgado Cintron have both written about him.

The Peter Joe Hamilton Elementary School in Chickasaw (in Mobile County) is named after Hamilton.

Preceded by Paul Charlton	Judge, United States District Court for the District of Puerto Rico; 1913–1921	Succeeded by Arthur Odlin
