= Robyn J. Blader =

American Brigadier General and practicing attorney

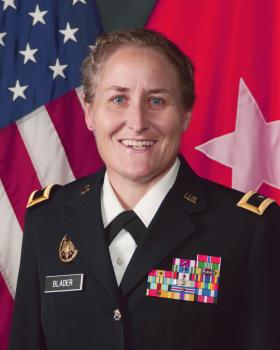
- Born: Wautoma, Wisconsin, US
- Spouse: Edward Lucht
- Military career
- Allegiance: United States
- Branch: United States Army Reserve; Wisconsin Army National Guard
- Rank: Brigadier General
- Conflicts: War in Afghanistan
- Awards: Bronze Star Medal; Meritorious Service Medal (2); Army Commendation Medal; Army Achievement Medal (2)

Robyn J. Blader is an American brigadier general in the Wisconsin Army National Guard and a practicing attorney in Wautoma, Wisconsin.

== Personal ==
Blader is married to Edward Lucht. They have two children.

== Military career ==
Blader originally enlisted in the United States Army Reserve. She later joined the Wisconsin Army National Guard and was commissioned an officer through the Army Reserve Officers' Training Corps.

After serving as a radio channel operator, she eventually joined the Military Police Company. Later, she became a judge advocate and eventually a military judge. From 2011 to 2012, Blader was deployed to serve in Operation Enduring Freedom. In 2018, she was named Assistant Adjutant General for Readiness and Training of the Wisconsin Army National Guard.

Awards she has received include the Bronze Star Medal, the Meritorious Service Medal with oak leaf cluster, the Army Commendation Medal, the Army Achievement Medal with oak leaf cluster, the Army Reserve Components Achievement Medal with four oak leaf clusters, the National Defense Service Medal with service star, the Afghanistan Campaign Medal with service star, the Global War on Terrorism Service Medal, the Military Outstanding Volunteer Service Medal, the Armed Forces Reserve Medal with silver hourglass and 'M' devices, the Army Service Ribbon, the Overseas Service Ribbon and the NATO Medal.

== Education ==
- University of Wisconsin-Oshkosh
- University of Wisconsin Law School – University of Wisconsin-Madison
- Touro University International
- The Judge Advocate General's School
- United States Army War College
- United States Army Command and General Staff College
