= The Mighty Jingles =

British YouTuber and retired veteran of the Royal Navy

Paul Charlton (born 10 March 1970), known as The Mighty Jingles, is a British YouTuber and retired veteran of the Royal Navy. In 2012, he started a channel on YouTube, in which he primarily shares Let's Play video game commentaries on various games. As of August 2025, The Mighty Jingles has over 650,000 subscribers.

== Biography ==
Paul Charlton was born in Newcastle upon Tyne, England. His father was a Paratrooper who had separated from his mother in 1974, and later died while serving in the French Foreign Legion. In 1978 his mother remarried and the family moved to South Africa, where his stepfather worked for the South African Iron and Steel Industrial Corporation (Iscor). After a year there, his parents moved to Swaziland. Charlton started his early education at a boarding school in Barberton, Transvaal during South Africa's turbulent apartheid period. In 1986, his family moved back to England.

=== Military career ===
Charlton joined the Royal Navy in 1989 as a Radio Operator on HMS Brazen. He moved on to being a Writer, a branch title that was subsequently changed to Logistician Personnel (Writer). A Veteran of the First Gulf War, he retired from the Royal Navy in 2011 as Leading rating (OR 4), after 22 years of service on six ships: apart from HMS Brazen, HMS Coventry, HMS Southampton, HMS Nottingham, HMS Newcastle, and HMS Manchester. Charltons last posting before retirement was at the Admiralty Interview Board at HMS Sultan in Gosport.

== YouTube ==
At first, Charlton used his YouTube channel to store World of Tanks replays for his own personal use. Inspired by other Let's Play videos, Charlton posted his first video on June 16, 2012, which was a replay of himself playing the Chinese Type 59 tank in World of Tanks along with his own commentary. Charlton became known for his World of Tanks videos, which Die Welt in 2014 stated having attracted 250,000 subscribers. His main YouTube account has over 651,000 subscribers (March 2026).

His content includes Mingles with Jingles on Mondays, where he chats about personal subjects and/or comments on present events in the gaming community. Tuesday through Saturdays consist of Let's Play replays, mostly World of Tanks and World of Warships. Other games of late include playthroughs of Assassin's Creed Valhalla, Red Dead Redemption 2, Cyberpunk 2077, Far Cry 6 and the Subnautica series.

He also has a cooking channel called Home with the Gnome in which he tries various recipes.

=== Community Contributor ===
- The Mighty Jingles was in the Wargaming Community Contributor Program until May 22, 2017
- The Mighty Jingles was in the World of Warships Community Contributor Program from February 19, 2018, to August 14, 2021.

=== Inclusion in Games ===
- The Mighty Jingles is included in World of Warships as a playable British Commander.
- The Mighty Jingles was (is) included in Fractured Space as a playable Captain, accompanied by his spacedog Boo by the May 2015 patch for current players up to that point.

=== Additions to Gamer Terminology ===
- When doing replays of sent-in material, if the sender's in-game username is too hard to pronounce, The Mighty Jingles always refers to the player as Dave. This has caused a number of people over recent years to open player accounts with the name Dave included, now making their way into The Mighty Jingles replays.
- His War Thunder videos are the origin of the gamer term Jingles landing, in which Jingles is notorious for crash landing any plane he is trying to land. He has even been able to perform a Jingles landing with a submarine in his playthrough of the game Cold Waters.
- In World of Tanks, the 152 mm BL-10 gun on the tier IX Object 704 and previously also the tier VIII ISU-152, was nicknamed the Trollcannon by The Mighty Jingles:"This gun has absolutely monstrous alpha damage, but sometimes, it just decides it can't hit the broad side of a barn. From the inside."
- In World of Tanks, the nick name Bert the Avenger was coined by YouTuber Circonflexes for the self-propelled gun FV304 in 2013, which was subsequently used and spread by The Mighty Jingles in his videos.

== Personal life ==
Charlton was engaged to Rita Sobral (alias RitaGamer) from October 2016 to March 2017. He bought a house and moved in following his 52nd birthday in 2022, after previously living in military accommodation or rented housing.

On the 26th February, 2024, Charlton announced on YouTube that he had been diagnosed with diabetes and, more importantly, bowel cancer. He indicated that he would continue to run his channel while tests continued to determine his prognosis and that he was focused on paying off his unit so that his friend Rita Sobral would be able to move in to take care of his two cats, which was of critical importance to him. Charlton received a colonoscopy on 31 March, 2024, that confirmed the bowel cancer diagnosis, and that the cancer had been caught early. Tissue samples were taken from the small tumor which are to be tested for whether it is malignant or not, after which Charlton is expected to receive surgery and chemotherapy. He had lost his best friend and fellow veteran Eddie the year before to the same illness, and stated that Eddie's death was influential in his decision to get tested as fast as possible upon feeling bowel related symptoms. On the 4th of May 2024, Charlton announced that his surgery to remove the bowel cancer was a complete success.

On the 2nd of April 2025, Charlton announced that he had suffered a heart attack and that this would affect the normal video upload schedule as he would need to spend at least a few days in hospital.

== Bibliography ==
- Lister, David and Charlton, Paul. (2018) Forgotten Tanks and Guns of the 1920s, 1930s and 1940s.

== Decorations ==
- (United Kingdom) The Gulf Medal (1992)
- (United Kingdom) The Naval Long Service and Good Conduct Medal (2004)
