= Ira K. Wells =

American judge (1871–1934)

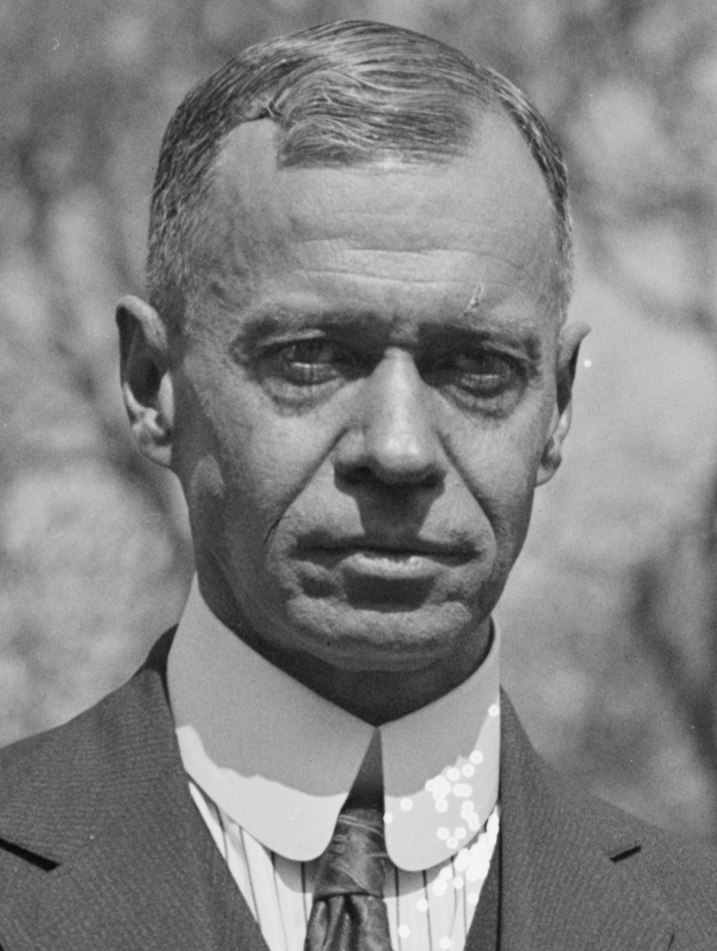

Judge of the United States District Court for the District of Puerto Rico
- In office 1925 – January 1933
- Preceded by: Arthur F. Odlin
- Succeeded by: Robert Archer Cooper

Personal details
- Born: Ira Kent Wells; June 18, 1871 Seneca, Kansas, U.S.
- Died: April 3, 1934 (aged 62) San Juan, Puerto Rico
- Party: Republican
- Education: University of Kansas
- Occupation: Lawyer, judge

Ira Kent Wells (June 18, 1871 – April 3, 1934) was an American lawyer and a federal judge in Puerto Rico.

== Early life and education ==
Wells was born in Seneca, Kansas. He obtained a law degree from the University of Kansas.

== Career ==
He practiced law in Seneca, Kansas, and became involved in politics in that state. Wells served as city attorney of Seneca, Kansas and county attorney of Nemaha County, Kansas. He was a delegate to the Republican National Convention in 1916 and served in the U.S. Army JAG Corps from 1917 to 1920.

In 1921, President Warren G. Harding named Wells as the United States Attorney for Puerto Rico, a position he held until 1924. The following year, President Calvin Coolidge named Wells as judge of the United States District Court for the District of Puerto Rico. Wells served two four-years terms as the sole federal judge in Puerto Rico, being renominated by President Herbert Hoover in 1929. He left office in January 1933 and was succeeded by Robert A. Cooper. Wells died in San Juan, Puerto Rico, in 1934.

Legal offices
Preceded by Arthur Odlin	Judge of the United States District Court for the District of Puerto Rico; 1925–1933	Succeeded by Robert A. Cooper
