= Charlton v. Kelly =

- Supreme Court of the United States

Argued April 18, 1913 Decided June 10, 1913
- Full case name: Paul Charlton, as Next Friend of Porter ter Charlton, Appt., v. James J. Kelly, Sheriff of Hudson County, New Jersey, et al.
- Citations: 229 U.S. 447 (more) 33 S. Ct. 945; 57 L. Ed. 1274

Holding
- Court recognized authority of the executive department to waive a breach of treaty by Italy and to remain bound thereby.

Court membership
- Chief Justice Edward D. White Associate Justices Joseph McKenna · Oliver W. Holmes Jr. William R. Day · Horace H. Lurton; Charles E. Hughes · Willis Van Devanter; Joseph R. Lamar · Mahlon Pitney

Case opinion
- Majority: Lurton, joined by unanimous

Charlton v. Kelly, 229 U.S. 447 (1913), is a case pertaining to extradition of a U.S. citizen to Italy. In 1910, Porter Charlton confessed in New York to having murdered his wife in Italy. The Italian vice consul requested Charlton's extradition. Hon. John A. Blair, one of the judges of the Circuit Court of the United States for the district of New Jersey, suspended Charlton's petition for a writ of habeas corpus and a warrant was issued for his arrest. This order for extradition was approved by Secretary of State Philander C. Knox.

== Opinion of the Court ==
In an opinion written by Justice Horace Harmon Lurton, the Court held that the United States had the right to waive a breach of its extradition treaty with Italy, and by waiving the breach, the countries would remain bound by the treaty.

== See also ==
- List of United States Supreme Court cases, volume 229
