= Porter Charlton =

Puerto Rican murderer

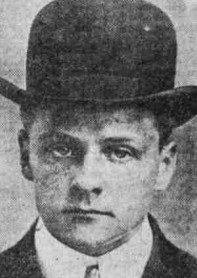
Charlton in 1910

Porter Charlton (September 21, 1888 - November 24, 1933) was the son of a Puerto Rican federal judge who in 1910 confessed in New York, United States, to murdering his wife at Lake Como in Italy and sinking the body in a trunk in the lake. He was extradited to Italy.

The Italian vice consul requested Charlton's extradition. John A. Blair, one of the judges of the Circuit Court of the United States for the district of New Jersey, suspended Charlton's petition for a writ of habeas corpus and a warrant was issued for his arrest. This order for extradition was approved by Philander C. Knox. The extradition was argued before the United States Supreme Court in 1913 as Charlton v. Kelly.

Charlton was convicted of murder in Italy in October 1915 and sentenced to six years and eight months in prison; since he had been in prison since his confession in June 1910, he served only twenty-nine additional days and returned from Naples to the US on the Italian liner SS America.
