= Wautoma (town), Wisconsin =

Wautoma, Wisconsin
- Town
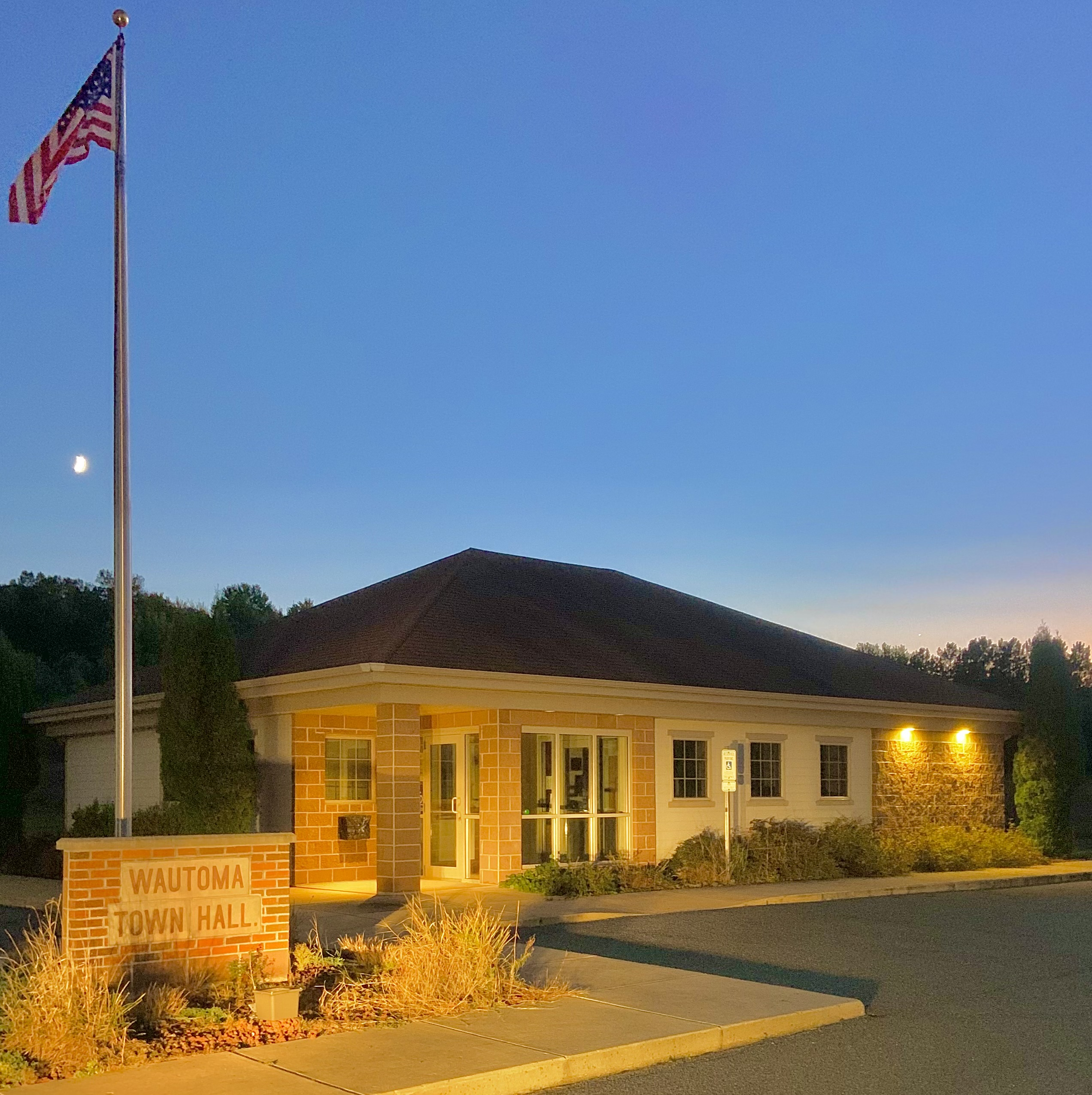
- Town hall

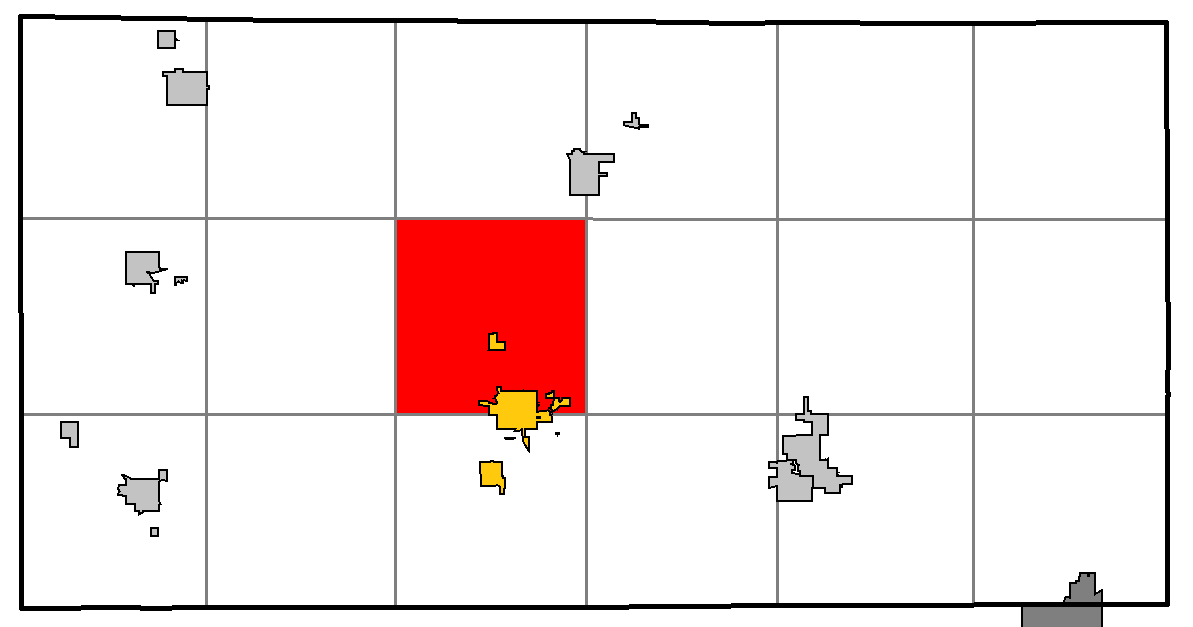
- Location of Wautoma, Waushara County

- Location of Waushara County, Wisconsin
- Coordinates: 44°6′22″N 89°18′36″W
- Country: United States
- State: Wisconsin
- County: Waushara

Area
  - Total: 34.1 sq mi (88.3 km^{2})
  - Land: 33.9 sq mi (87.9 km^{2})
  - Water: 0.15 sq mi (0.4 km^{2})
- Elevation: 1,050 ft (320 m)

Population (2020)
  - Total: 1,270
  - Density: 37.4/sq mi (14.4/km^{2})
- Time zone: UTC-6 (Central (CST))
  - Summer (DST): UTC-5 (CDT)
- Area code: 920
- FIPS code: 55-84650
- GNIS feature ID: 1584384

Wautoma is a town in Waushara County, Wisconsin, United States. The population was 1,270 at the 2020 census.

== Geography ==
According to the United States Census Bureau, the town has a total area of 34.1 square miles (88.3 km^{2}), of which 33.9 square miles (87.9 km^{2}) is land and 0.1 square mile (0.4 km^{2}) (0.41%) is water.

== Demographics ==
As of the census of 2000, there were 1,312 people, 523 households, and 380 families residing in the town. The population density was 38.7 people per square mile (14.9/km^{2}). There were 603 housing units at an average density of 17.8 per square mile (6.9/km^{2}). The racial makeup of the town was 96.95% White, 0.30% Black or African American, 0.15% Native American, 0.84% Asian, 1.07% from other races, and 0.69% from two or more races. 2.82% of the population were Hispanic or Latino of any race.

There were 523 households, out of which 27.5% had children under the age of 18 living with them, 62.1% were married couples living together, 7.3% had a female householder with no husband present, and 27.3% were non-families. 22.8% of all households were made up of individuals, and 8.8% had someone living alone who was 65 years of age or older. The average household size was 2.46 and the average family size was 2.88.

In the town, the population was spread out, with 22.5% under the age of 18, 5.6% from 18 to 24, 25.0% from 25 to 44, 27.7% from 45 to 64, and 19.3% who were 65 years of age or older. The median age was 43 years. For every 100 females, there were 98.5 males. For every 100 females age 18 and over, there were 99.4 males.

The median income for a household in the town was $39,185, and the median income for a family was $44,063. Males had a median income of $36,012 versus $23,500 for females. The per capita income for the town was $17,981. About 5.3% of families and 9.7% of the population were below the poverty line, including 8.6% of those under age 18 and 19.3% of those age 65 or over.
