= 2020 Puerto Rican general election =

- November 3, 2020
- Gubernatorial election
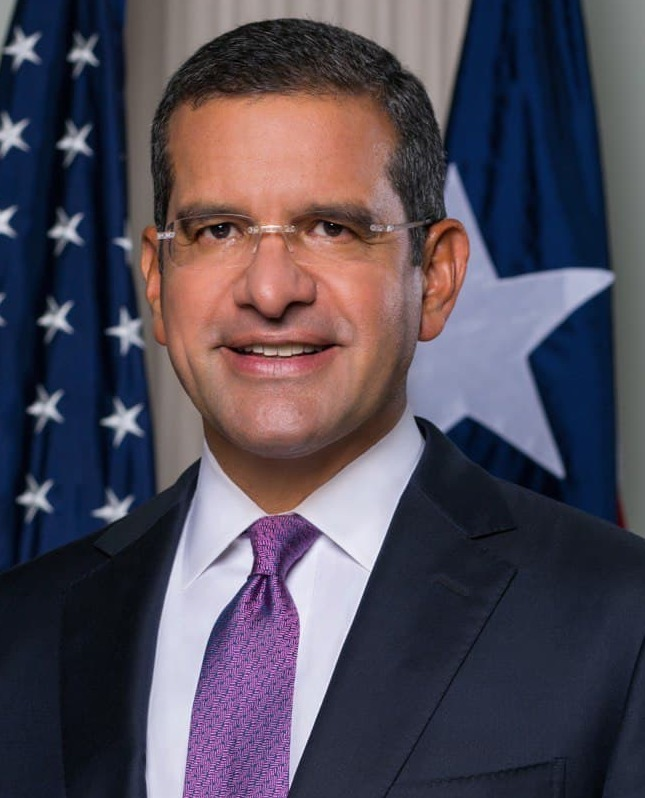

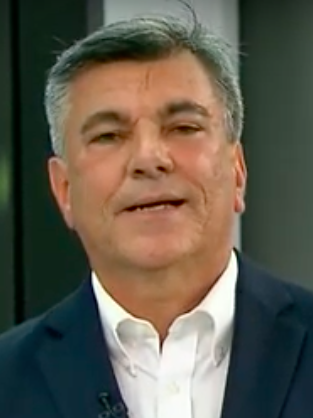

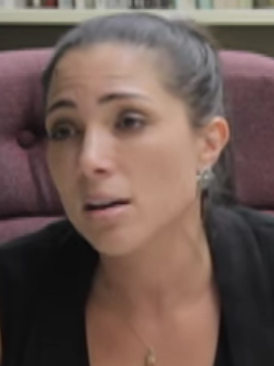

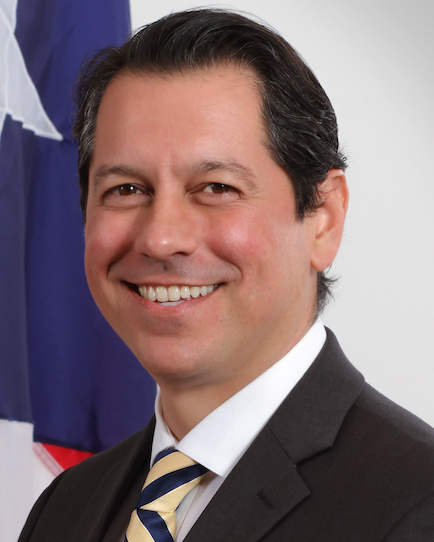

Nominee	Pedro Pierluisi	Carlos Delgado Altieri	Alexandra Lúgaro
Party	New Progressive	Popular Democratic	Citizens' Victory
Popular vote	427,016	407,817	179,265
Percentage	33.16%	31.67%	13.92%
Nominee	Juan Dalmau	César Vázquez Muñiz
Party	Independence	Project Dignity
Popular vote	175,402	87,379
Percentage	13.54%	6.79%
- Results by municipality Pierluisi: 20–30% 30–40% 40–50% Delgado: 20–30% 30–40% 40–50%
Governor before election
Wanda Vázquez Garced
New Progressive
Elected Governor
Pedro Pierluisi
New Progressive
- Resident Commissioner election
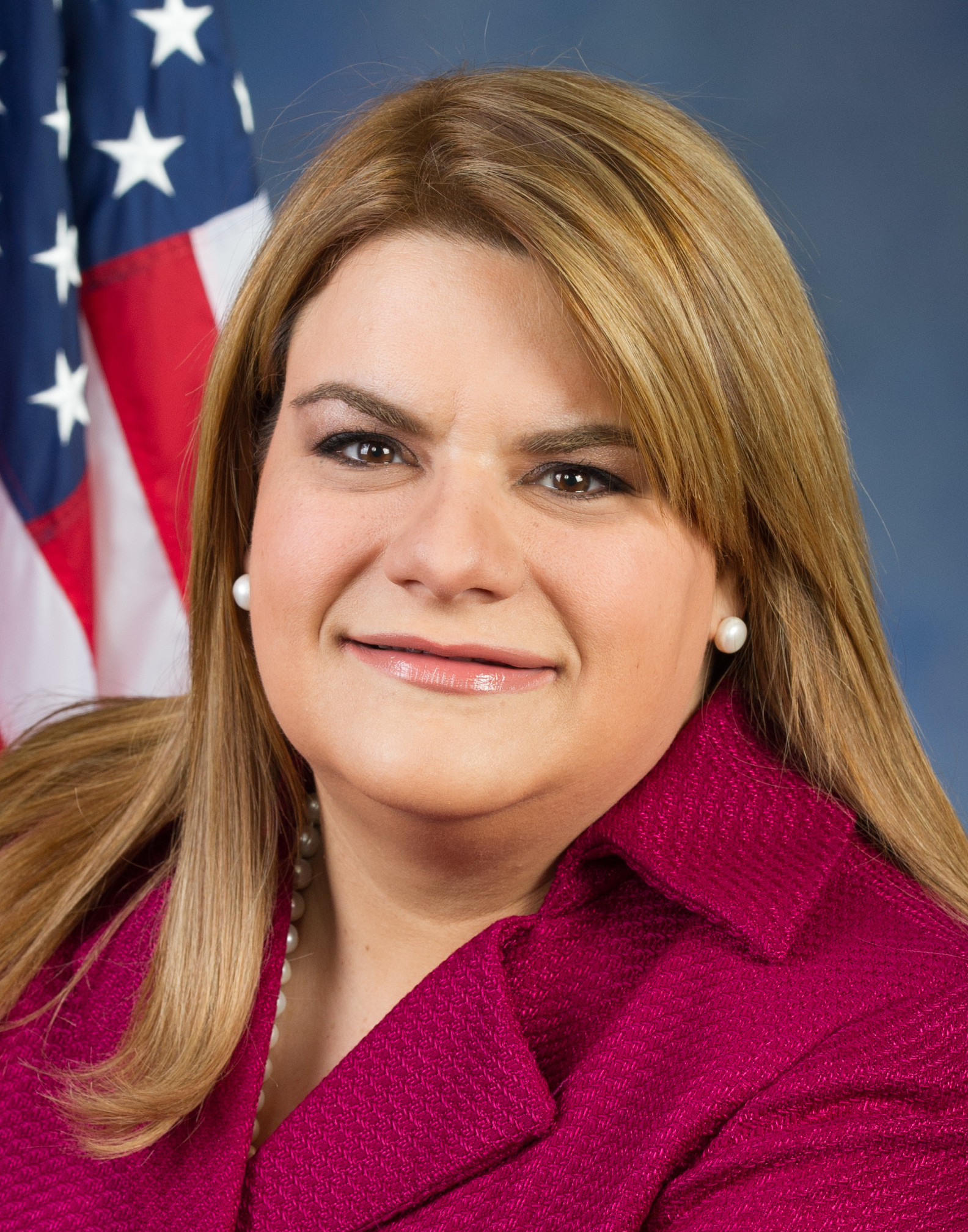

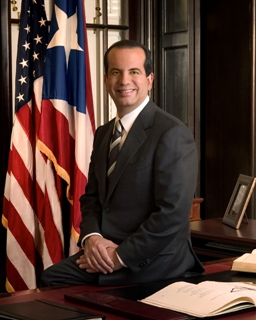

Candidate	Jenniffer González-Colón	Aníbal Acevedo Vilá	Zayira Jordán Conde
Party	New Progressive	Popular Democratic	Citizens' Victory
Alliance	Republican	Democratic
Popular vote	512,697	400,412	157,679
Percentage	41.14%	32.13%	12.65%
Candidate	Ada Norah Henriquez	Luis Roberto Piñero
Party	Project Dignity	Independence
Popular vote	95,873	78,503
Percentage	7.69%	6.30%
- Results by municipality González: 30–40% 40–50% 50–60% Acevedo: 30–40% 40–50%
Resident Commissioner before election
Jenniffer González
New Progressive
Elected Resident Commissioner
Jenniffer González
New Progressive

General elections were held in Puerto Rico on November 3, 2020, to elect the officials of the Puerto Rican government who served from January 2021 to January 2025, most notably the position of Governor and Resident Commissioner. In addition, there was a non-binding status referendum to ask voters if Puerto Rico should become the 51st state of the Union.

Incumbent New Progressive Party Governor Wanda Vázquez Garced, who succeeded to the governorship on August 7, 2019, was eligible to run for a full term in office, which she announced on December 16, 2019. However, Vázquez Garced lost her bid when former Resident Commissioner Pedro Pierluisi won the New Progressive Party membership vote on the nomination for governor.

Pierluisi ultimately won the election on November 3, 2020, albeit by a narrow margin of 1.49%. As a result, this election was the closest race of the 2020 gubernatorial election cycle. Pierlusi's winning 33% of the vote was the lowest obtained by a successful gubernatorial candidate in Puerto Rico since the first direct election in 1948. Jenniffer González-Colón was re-elected as Resident Commissioner.

== Electoral system ==
The Governor and Resident Commissioner are elected via first-past-the-post voting. The Resident Commissioner of Puerto Rico is the only member of the United States House of Representatives who is elected every four years instead of a two-year term.

== Candidates ==
=== Governor ===
==== New Progressive Party ====
On March 3, 2019, Ricardo Rosselló announced he would seek re-election as governor in the 2020 elections; however, following the Telegramgate scandal and subsequent protests in front of La Fortaleza, Rosselló announced on July 21, 2019, that he would withdraw his bid for re-election. Shortly thereafter, on August 2, he resigned as governor.

On September 9, 2019, Pedro Pierluisi, who served briefly as de facto governor following Rosselló's resignation, announced he would seek the PNP nomination for governor for the 2020 elections. On December 19, 2019, Governor Wanda Vázquez Garced, who was elevated to governor on August 7, 2019, after Pierluisi's appointment was deemed unconstitutional, announced her intention to seek re-election to a full term as governor.

On August 16, 2020, in an extended primary process marred by troubles delivering ballots to polling places for the original primary date of August 9, Pierluisi defeated Vázquez Garced.

==== Popular Democratic Party ====
After the defeat of Popular Democratic candidate David Bernier in the 2016 Puerto Rico gubernatorial elections, the party was mostly divided in opinions on how to move forward to the 2020 elections. While many in the party wanted to keep going with the same ideology of the Free Associated State, Carmen Yulín Cruz expressed a desire to create a new movement in the party, one that would support a free association of Puerto Rico as an independent country from the United States.

On August 16, 2020, in an extended primary process marred by troubles delivering ballots to polling places for the original primary date of August 9, Delgado defeated Bhatia and Cruz.

==== Other candidates ====
On December 27, 2019, the Puerto Rican Independence Party (PIP) filed its list of candidates for the general election, including Sen. Juan Dalmau as governor. Dalmau previously ran as the PIP candidate in the 2012 Puerto Rico gubernatorial election.

After the defeat of Alexandra Lúgaro as an independent candidate and Rafael Bernabe Riefkohl as the candidate for the Working People's Party in the 2016 Puerto Rico gubernatorial election, the two candidates joined with other Puerto Rican politicians in March 2019 to form a new political party called Movimiento Victoria Ciudadana (Citizen's Victory Movement). On November 19, 2019, Alexandra Lúgaro announced her second run for governor, this time running as the MVC candidate.

Proyecto Dignidad was certified as an official party by the CEE (State Commission on Elections) on January 22, 2020. It needed 47,406 petitions of endorsement to be certified, of which it received 47,856. On May 20, 2020, the party announced that César Vazquez would be their gubernatorial nominee.

On May 5, 2020, the CEE (State Commission on Elections) certified the candidacy of Eliezer Molina after a legal dispute over the amount of endorsements required to ratify his nomination.

=== Resident Commissioner ===
On November 3, 2019, incumbent resident commissioner Jenniffer González of the PNP announced that she would run for a second term for the office of resident commissioner.

On December 10, 2019, former governor Aníbal Acevedo Vilá of the PPD announced that he would run for a second non-consecutive term for resident commissioner. His first term was from 2001 to 2005. He became the official nominee on January 31, 2020, after his opponent José Nadal Power did not receive enough endorsements to officialize his candidacy.

On December 27, 2019, the Puerto Rican Independence Party nominated Dr. Luis Roberto Piñero for resident commissioner.

On February 5, 2020, the Citizen's Victory Movement had a general assembly, where Dr. Zayira Jordán Conde was chosen as the candidate for resident commissioner.

The final candidates were:

- Jenniffer González Colón, New Progressive Party (PNP/R)
- Aníbal Acevedo Vilá, Popular Democratic Party (PPD/D)
- Luis Roberto Piñero, Puerto Rican Independence Party (PIP)
- Zayira Jordán Conde, Movimiento Victoria Ciudadana (MVC)
- Ada Norah Henriquez, Proyecto Dignidad (PD)

== Referendum ==
The referendum asked one yes-or-no question:

"¿Debe Puerto Rico ser admitido inmediatamente dentro de la Unión como un Estado?" (Should Puerto Rico be admitted immediately into the Union as a State?)

There were 655,505 votes in favor of statehood (52.52%) and 592,671 votes opposed (47.48%). The referendum was non-binding, as the power to grant statehood lies with the United States Congress.

== Opinion polls ==
=== Governor ===
View source data.

Poll source	Date(s) administered	Sample size (Note: Key: A – all adults RV – registered voters LV – likely voters V – unclear)	Margin of error	Pedro Pierluisi (PNP-D)	Charlie Delgado (PPD)	Juan Dalmau (PIP)	Alexandra Lúgaro (MVC)	César Vázquez (PD)	Other	Undecided
The Research Office/El Nuevo Día	October 27–30, 2020	1000 (RV)	± 3%	35%	34%	10%	11%	5%	2% (Note: Molina (I) and "Other candidate" with 1%)	3%
Jorge Benítez Nazario/Radio Isla/Telemundo Puerto Rico	October 23–November 1, 2020	1,010 (LV)	± 2.5%	32%	35%	15%	11%	3%	1% (Note: Molina (I) with 1%)	–
Data for Progress	October 19–26, 2020	439 (LV)	± 5%	39%	35%	8%	10%	1%	2% (Note: Would not vote with 2%; Molina (I) and "Other candidate" with 0%)	5%
Radio Isla/Jorge Benítez	October 12–17, 2020	676 (RV)	± 3.16%	31%	35%	14%	12%	1%	1% (Note: Molina (I) with 1%)	5%
Gaither International/El Vocero	September 21 – October 6, 2020	2,401 (A)	± 2%	27%	24%	8%	9%	2%	6% (Note: "None" with 3%; Molina (I) with 2%; "Other" with 1%)	23%
Beacon Research/Puerto Rico Herald	October 1–5, 2020	1,200 (LV)	–	31%	24%	8%	9%	3%	7% (Note: Would not vote with 3%; Molina (I) and "Someone else" with 2%)	18% (Note: Includes "refused")
El Nuevo Día	September 19–23, 2020	1,000 (RV)	± 3.1%	38%	37%	6%	13%	1%	2% (Note: "Other candidate" with 1%; would not vote with 1%)	5%
Beacon Research/Puerto Rico Herald	September 14–18, 2020	803 (RV)	—	29%	27%	6%	8%	3%	9% (Note: Independent Eliezer Molina with 2%, "Someone else" with 4%, "Would not vote" with 3%)	17%
Becaon Research/Puerto Rico Herald	July 20–26, 2020	802 (V)	–	26%	24%	7%	6%	2%	18% (Note: Would not vote with 11%; "Someone else" with 7%)	16%
El Nuevo Día	February 21–25, 2020	1,000 (RV)	± 3.1%	40%	19%	7%	6%	4% (Note: Polled as "Candidate of Project Dignity")	18% (Note: "Other candidate" with 11%; would not vote with 7%)	6%

Hypothetical polling

with Pedro Pierluisi

Poll source	Date(s) administered	Sample size	Margin of error	Pedro Pierluisi (PNP-D)	Eduardo Bhatia (PPD-D)	Juan Dalmau Ramírez (PIP)	Alexandra Lúgaro (MVC)	Other	Undecided
Becaon Research/Puerto Rico Herald	July 20–26, 2020	802 (V)	–	27%	16%	7%	7%	26% (Note: Would not vote with 14%; "Someone else" with 9%; Vázquez (PD) with 3%)	17%
Beacon Research/Puerto Rico Herald	May 3–7, 2020	903 (LV)	–	25%	15%	5%	8%	34% (Note: Would not vote with 23%; "Someone else" with 11%)	14%
Diario Las Américas	March 30-April 21, 2020	1,500 (RV)	± 2.6%	42%	22%	15%	–	10%	11%
Beacon Research/Puerto Rico Herald	March, 2020	– (V) (Note: Not yet released)	–	22%	20%	5%	7%	28% (Note: "Someone else" and would not vote with 14%)	18%
Beacon Research/Puerto Rico Herald	February, 2020	– (V)	–	29%	20%	5%	8%	24% (Note: Would not vote with 15%; "Someone else" with 9%)	14%
El Nuevo Día	February 21–25, 2020	1,000 (RV)	± 3.1%	38%	23%	6%	7%	20% (Note: "Other candidate" with 9%; would not vote with 7%; Generic Project Dignity with 4%)	6%

Poll source	Date(s) administered	Sample size	Margin of error	Pedro Pierluisi (PNP-D)	Carmen Yulín Cruz (PPD-D)	Juan Dalmau Ramírez (PIP)	Alexandra Lúgaro (MVC)	Other	Undecided
Diario Las Américas	March 30-April 21, 2020	1,500 (RV)	± 2.6%	42%	21%	14%	–	12%	12%
El Nuevo Día	February 21–25, 2020	1,000 (RV)	± 3.1%	40%	19%	7%	6%	22% (Note: "Other candidate" with 11%; would not vote with 7%; Generic Project Dignity with 4%)	6%

with Wanda Vázquez

Poll source	Date(s) administered	Sample size	Margin of error	Wanda Vázquez (PNP-R)	Eduardo Bhatia (PPD-D)	Juan Dalmau Ramírez (PIP)	Alexandra Lúgaro (MVC)	Other	Undecided
Becaon Research/Puerto Rico Herald	July 20–26, 2020	802 (V)	–	24%	17%	9%	7%	27% (Note: Would not vote with 14%; "Someone else" with 9%; Vázquez (PD) with 4%)	16%
Beacon Research/Puerto Rico Herald	May 3–7, 2020	903 (LV)	–	29%	14%	5%	8%	31% (Note: Would not vote with 21%; "Someone else" with 10%)	14%
Diario Las Américas	March 30-April 21, 2020	1,500 (RV)	± 2.6%	41%	27%	12%	–	9%	11%
Beacon Research/Puerto Rico Herald	February, 2020	– (V)	–	26%	20%	4%	9%	27% (Note: Would not vote with 18%; "Someone else" with 9%)	11%
El Nuevo Día	February 21–25, 2020	1,000 (RV)	± 3.1%	40%	20%	7%	6%	21% (Note: Would not vote with 9%; "Other candidate" with 8%; Generic Project Dignity with 4%)	6%

Poll source	Date(s) administered	Sample size	Margin of error	Wanda Vázquez (PNP-R)	Carmen Yulín Cruz (PPD-D)	Juan Dalmau Ramírez (PIP)	Alexandra Lúgaro (MVC)	Other	Undecided
Diario Las Américas	March 30-April 21, 2020	1,500 (RV)	± 2.6%	46%	21%	12%	–	10%	11%
El Nuevo Día	February 21–25, 2020	1,000 (RV)	± 3.1%	41%	15%	6%	5%	21%	6%

Poll source	Date(s) administered	Sample size	Margin of error	Wanda Vázquez (PNP-R)	Charlie Delgado (PPD)	Juan Dalmau Ramírez (PIP)	Alexandra Lúgaro (MVC)	Other	Undecided
Becaon Research/Puerto Rico Herald	July 20–26, 2020	802 (V)	–	24%	23%	7%	7%	23% (Note: Would not vote with 13%; "Someone else" with 7%; Vázquez (PD) with 3%)	17%
El Nuevo Día	February 21–25, 2020	1,000 (RV)	± 3.1%	42%	20%	5%	6%	21%	6%

=== Resident Commissioner ===
View source data.

Poll source	Date(s) administered	Sample size	Margin of error	Jenniffer González (PNP-R)	Aníbal Acevedo Vilá (PPD-D)	Luis Roberto Piñero (PIP)	Zayira Jordán Conde (MVC)	Ada Norah Henriquez (PD)	Other	Undecided
The Research Office/El Nuevo Día	October 27–30, 2020	1000 (RV)	± 3%	44%	32%	7%	9%	4%	–	4%
Jorge Benítez Nazario/Radio Isla/Telemundo Puerto Rico	October 23 – November 1, 2020	1,010 (LV)	± 2.5%	43%	39%	7%	4%	3%	–	–
Data For Progress	October 19–26, 2020	439 (LV)	± 5.0%	46%	34%	4%	8%	0%	0% (Note: "Other candidate" and would not vote with 0%)	7%
Radio Isla/Jorge Benítez	October 12–17, 2020	676 (RV)	± 3.16%	43%	40%	7%	2%	2%	–	6%
Beacon Research/Puerto Rico Herald	October 13–15, 2020	809 (RV)	–	44%	26%	–	5%	2%	7% (Note: Would not vote with 6%; "Someone else" with 1%)	16% (Note: Includes "Refused")
Gaither International/El Vocero	September 21 – October 6, 2020	2,401 (A)	± 2%	44%	16%	3%	5%	3%	6% (Note: "None" with 6%)	5%
Beacon Research/Puerto Rico Herald	October 1–5, 2020	1,200 (LV)	–	47%	22%	–	7%	2%	8% (Note: Would not vote with 6%; "Someone else" with 2%)	14%
El Nuevo Día	September 19–23, 2020	1,000 (RV)	± 3.1%	43%	33%	6%	11%	1%	1% (Note: Would not vote with 1%)	5%
Becaon Research/Puerto Rico Herald	September 14–18, 2020	803 (RV)	–	51%	18%	–	7%	3%	8% (Note: Would not vote with 5%; "Someone else" with 3%)	13%
Radio Isla/Jorge Benítez	July 28–August 3, 2020	983 (LV)	± 2.5%	40%	34%	6%	8%	3%	–	9%
Becaon Research/Puerto Rico Herald	July 20–26, 2020	802 (V)	–	50%	21%	–	4%	2%	10% (Note: Would not vote with 8%; "Someone else" with 2%)	12%
Beacon Research/Puerto Rico Herald	May 3–7, 2020	903 (LV)	–	48%	15%	–	4%	–	25% (Note: Would not vote with 17%; "Someone else" with 8%)	8%
Beacon Research/Puerto Rico Herald	March, 2020	– (V) (Note: Not yet released)	–	32%	21%	–	5%	–	26% (Note: Would not vote with 17%; "Someone else" with 9%)	16%
Beacon Research/Puerto Rico Herald	February, 2020	– (V)	–	39%	22%	–	5%	–	25% (Note: Would not vote with 16%; "Someone else" with 9%)	9%

Hypothetical polling

with Generic Project Dignity

Poll source	Date(s) administered	Sample size	Margin of error	Jenniffer González (PNP-R)	Aníbal Acevedo Vilá (PPD-D)	Luis Roberto Piñero (PIP)	Zayira Jordán Conde (MVC)	Generic Project Dignity	Other	Undecided
El Nuevo Día	February 21–25, 2020	1,000 (RV)	± 3.1%	41%	20%	5%	5%	4%	19% (Note: "Other candidate" with 12%; would not vote with 7%)	6%

=== San Juan Mayoralty ===
Poll source	Date(s) administered	Sample size	Margin of error	Rossana Lopez (PPD)	Miguel Romero (PNP)	Manuel Natal (MVC)	Adrian Gonzalez (PIP)	Nelson Rosario (PD)	Other	Undecided
Beacon Research/Puerto Rico Herald	October 13–15, 2020	258 (RV)	–	26%	37%	10%	2%	1%	2% (Note: "Someone else" with 2%)	23% (Note: Includes "Refused")
Gaither International/El Vocero	October 1–7, 2020	500 (V)	± 4%	17%	38%	18%	2%	1%	–	24%

=== Referendum ===
Poll source	Date(s) administered	Sample size	Margin of error	Yes	No	Other / Undecided
Beacon Research/Puerto Rico Herald	September 14–18, 2020	803 (V)	± 3.5%	53%	35%	12% (Note: Would not vote with 4%; "Refused" with 1%; Undecided with 7%)
Beacon Research/Puerto Rico Herald	July 20–26, 2020	802 (V)	± 3.5%	54%	33%	14% (Note: Would not vote with 4%; "Refused" with 2%; Undecided with 8%)

== Results ==
=== Governor ===
The gubernatorial election was won by former resident commissioner Pedro Pierluisi (PNP/D), narrowly defeating Isabela Mayor Carlos Delgado (PPD/I). The margin of victory was of 1.49%, making it the third closest election in the last 20 years, the former being the 2004 election (0.18%) and the 2012 election (0.7%). In a surprising turn of events, all five parties remained registered, including the Puerto Rican Independence Party (PIP) which had failed to remain registered in the last four elections.

Candidate	Party	Votes	%
Pedro Pierluisi	New Progressive Party	427,016	33.16
Carlos Delgado Altieri	Popular Democratic Party	407,817	31.67
Alexandra Lúgaro	Movimiento Victoria Ciudadana	179,265	13.92
Juan Dalmau	Puerto Rican Independence Party	174,402	13.54
César Vázquez Muñiz	Proyecto Dignidad	87,379	6.79
Eliezer Molina Pérez	Independent	8,751	0.68
Write-ins		3,115	0.24
Total		1,287,745	100.00
Valid votes		1,287,745	99.70
Invalid votes		838	0.06
Blank votes		3,055	0.24
Total votes		1,291,638	100.00
Registered voters/turnout		2,355,894	54.83
Source: CEEPUR

=== Resident commissioner ===
The resident commissioner election was won by incumbent resident commissioner Jennifer Gonzalez (PNP/R), defeating former governor Anibal Acevedo Vila (PPD/D) by a wide margin (9.02%). Gonzalez received the most votes out of any candidate. She will become the first female and youngest resident commissioner to be re-elected to her seat.

Candidate	Party	Votes	%
Jenniffer González-Colón	New Progressive Party	512,697	41.14
Aníbal Acevedo Vilá	Popular Democratic Party	400,412	32.13
Zayira Jordán Conde	Movimiento Victoria Ciudadana	157,679	12.65
Ada Norah Henriquez	Proyecto Dignidad	95,873	7.69
Luis Roberto Piñero	Puerto Rican Independence Party	78,503	6.30
Write-ins		928	0.07
Total		1,246,092	100.00
Valid votes		1,246,092	99.69
Invalid votes		838	0.07
Blank votes		3,055	0.24
Total votes		1,249,985	100.00
Registered voters/turnout		2,355,894	53.06
Source: Puerto Rico Election Archive

=== Senate ===
While the New Progressive Party lost their 2/3 majority, the Popular Democratic Party failed to get the 1/2 majority by two seats. This senate will be the most diverse, having at least one senator of each party, including one independent senator.

Party	At-large			District			Total seats
Party	Votes	%	Seats	Votes	%	Seats	Total seats
New Progressive Party	404,114	33.34	4	859,719	37.60	6	10
Popular Democratic Party	378,738	31.25	2	836,889	36.60	10	12
Puerto Rican Independence Party	136,679	11.28	1	205,137	8.97	0	1
Movimiento Victoria Ciudadana	133,069	10.98	2	324,319	14.18	0	2
Proyecto Dignidad	88,716	7.32	1	59,189	2.59	0	1
Independents	69,810	5.76	1				1
Write-ins	990	0.08	0	1,119	0.05	0	0
Total	1,212,116	100.00	11	2,286,372	100.00	16	27
Valid votes	1,212,116	99.12					
Invalid votes	991	0.08					
Blank votes	9,802	0.80					
Total votes	1,222,909	100.00					
Registered voters/turnout	2,355,894	51.91					
Source: Puerto Rico Election Archive

=== House of Representatives ===
The New Progressive Party lost their 2/3 majority and the Popular Democratic Party gained enough seats to receive the 1/2 majority. This House of Representatives will be the most diverse, having at least one representative of each party.

Party	At-large			District			Total seats
Party	Votes	%	Seats	Votes	%	Seats	Total seats
Popular Democratic Party	435,325	36.03	2	459,368	39.09	24	26
New Progressive Party	408,869	33.84	5	461,323	39.26	16	21
Movimiento Victoria Ciudadana	154,971	12.82	2	128,797	10.96	0	2
Puerto Rican Independence Party	127,577	10.56	1	102,266	8.70	0	1
Proyecto Dignidad	81,360	6.73	1	18,790	1.60	0	1
Independents				3,277	0.28	0	0
Write-ins	294	0.02	0	1,208	0.10	0	0
Total	1,208,396	100.00	11	1,175,029	100.00	40	51
Valid votes	1,208,396	99.11		1,175,029	99.09		
Invalid votes	991	0.08		991	0.08		
Blank votes	9,802	0.80		9,802	0.83		
Total votes	1,219,189	100.00		1,185,822	100.00		
Registered voters/turnout	2,355,894	51.75		2,355,894	50.33		
Source: Puerto Rico Election Archive

=== Mayoral ===
The Popular Democratic Party kept the majority of municipalities, but it lowered from 45 to 41. Many incumbent mayors lost their races after years in the position, like Ponce (12 years under PNP) and Humacao (20 years under PPD). The closest race was of Guánica, where both Ismael Rodríguez (PPD) and Edgardo Cruz (Ind) claimed victory. At the end, the Supreme Court confirmed Rodríguez as the winner.

Party	Mayoralties
Popular Democratic Party	41
New Progressive Party	37
Puerto Rican Independence Party	0
Movimiento Victoria Ciudadana	0
Proyecto Dignidad	0
Independents	0
Total	78
Source: CEEPUR

=== Referendum ===
The option of "yes" won in the referendum, making the third time statehood won the majority of votes. The referendum is non-binding, as the power to grant statehood lies with the United States Congress.

Choice	Votes	%
For	655,505	52.52
Against	592,671	47.48
Total	1,248,176	100.00
Valid votes	1,248,176	96.89
Invalid votes	464	0.04
Blank votes	39,546	3.07
Total votes	1,288,186	100.00
Registered voters/turnout	2,355,894	54.68
Source: Puerto Rico Election Archive
