= 2020 Puerto Rico primaries =

The 2020 Puerto Rico primaries may refer to:

- 2020 United States presidential primaries in Puerto Rico
  - 2020 Puerto Rico Democratic primary
- Territorial government primaries
  - 2020 New Progressive Party of Puerto Rico primaries
  - 2020 Popular Democratic Party of Puerto Rico primaries
