= James Battin =

James Battin may refer to:

- James F. Battin (1925–1996), American politician from Montana, father of Jim Battin
- Jim Battin (born 1962), American politician from California, son of James Franklin Battin

== See also ==
- James Batten (1936–1995), American journalist and publisher
