= Mirror Lake Library =

Historic library in St. Petersburg, Florida, US

- Mirror Lake Community Library
- U.S. National Register of Historic Places
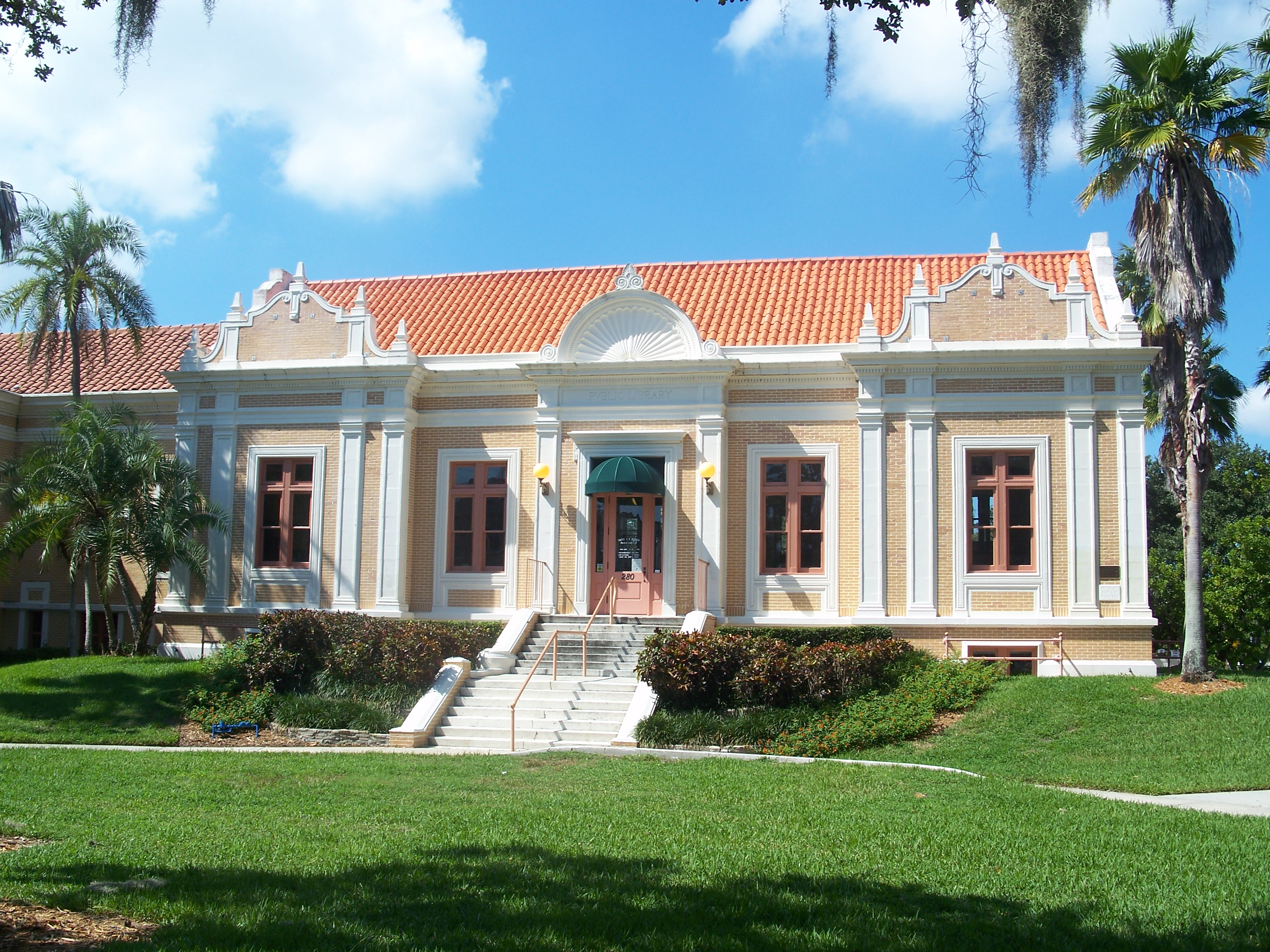

- Location within Florida Location within the United States
- Location: St. Petersburg, Florida
- Coordinates: 27°46′29″N 82°38′26″W
- Architectural style: Beaux-arts
- NRHP reference No.: 86001259
- Added to NRHP: June 13, 1986

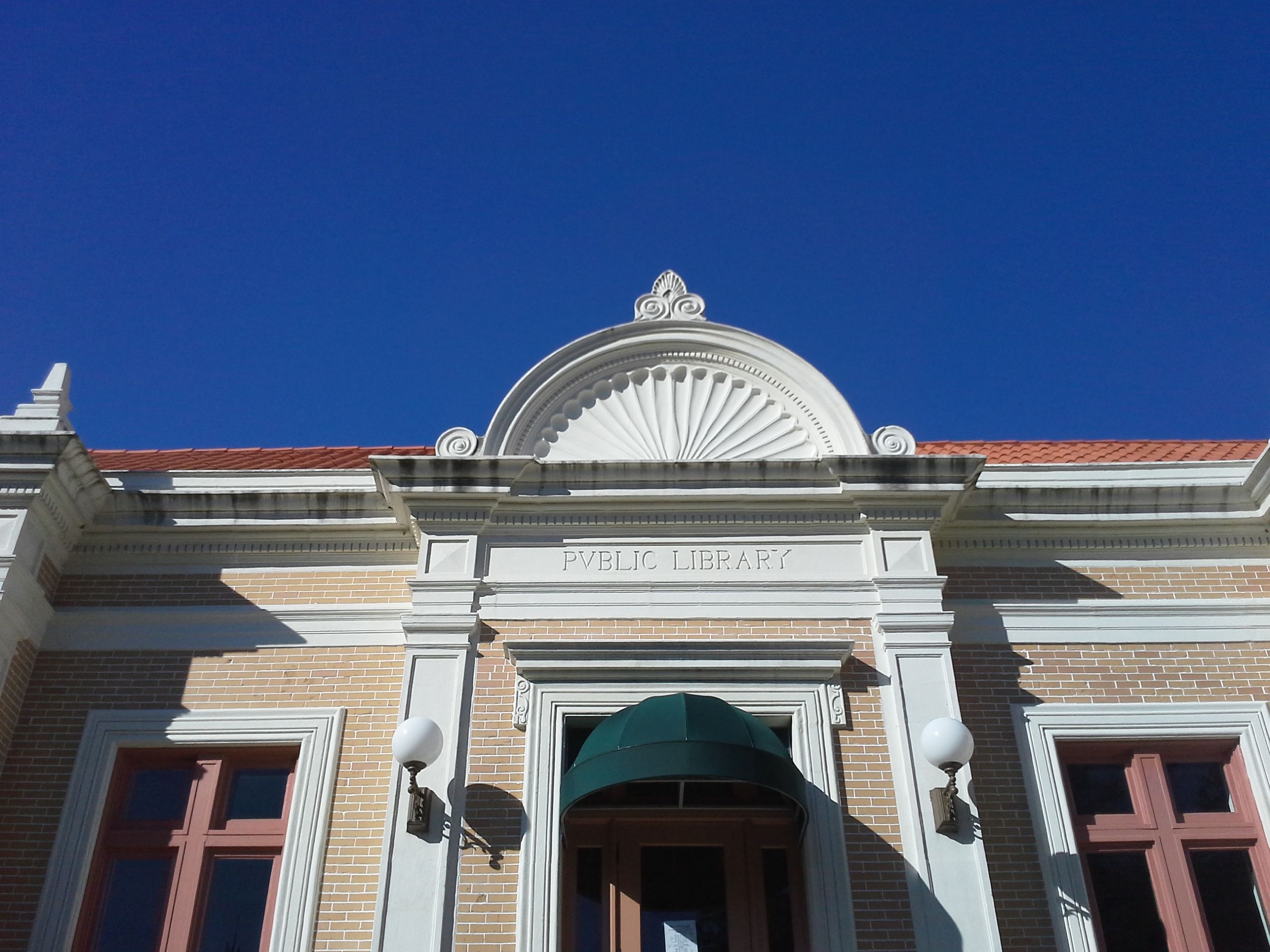
PVBLIC LIBRARY inscribed over East entrance of the 1915 building

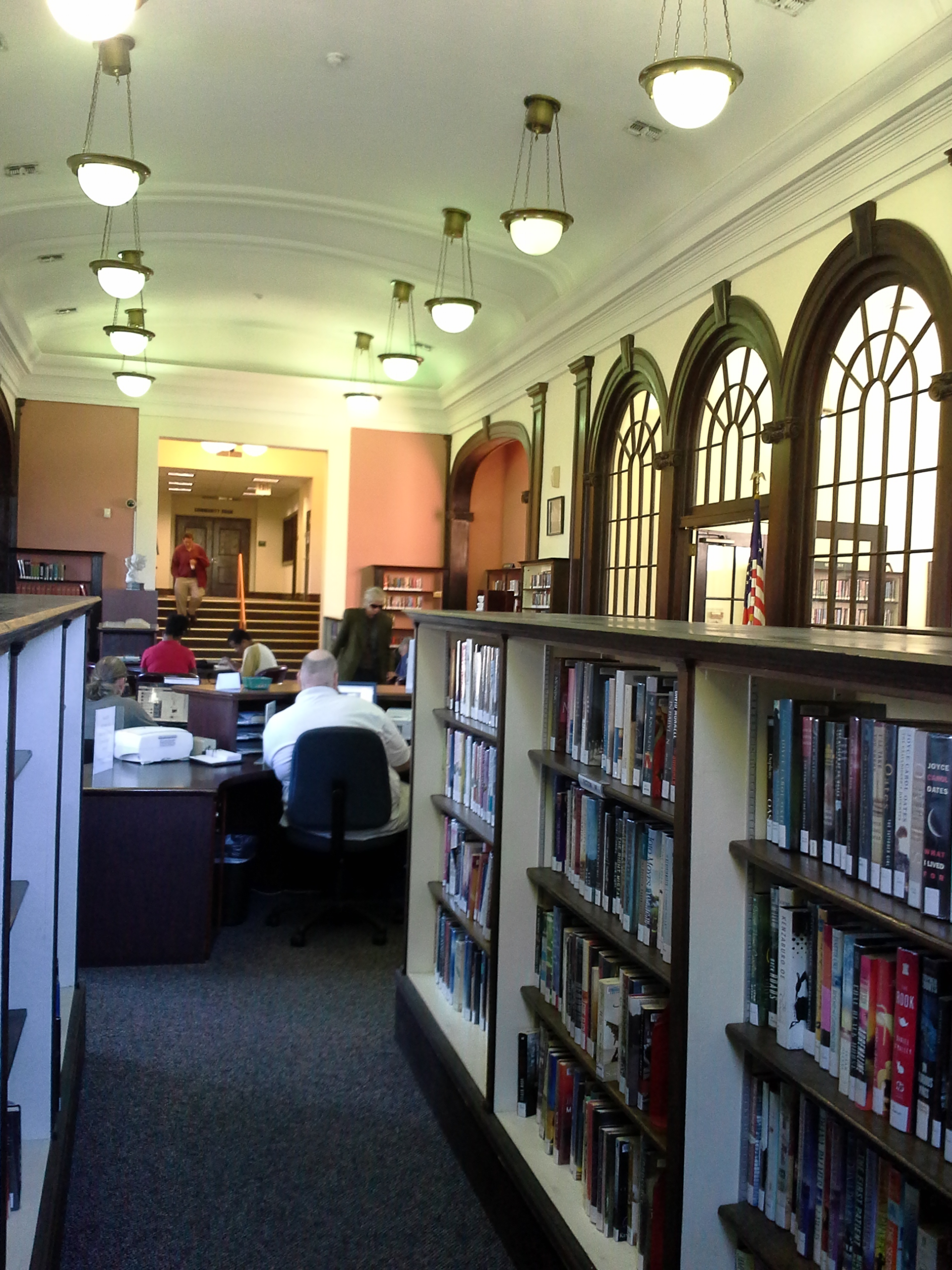
Interior of the 1915 building

The Mirror Lake Community Library is a Carnegie library built in 1915 in Beaux-Arts style. It was one of ten Florida Carnegie libraries to receive grants awarded by the Carnegie Corporation of New York from 1901 to 1917. Steel magnate and philanthropist Andrew Carnegie provided funding for more than 3,000 Carnegie libraries in the United States, Canada, and Europe. The library is significant to the city's history as the first permanent home of the public library system and embodies the transformation of the city in the second decade of the twentieth century from a pioneer village to a city with viable cultural institutions.

== History ==
In 1908, the St. Petersburg City Council and concerned citizens began on a journey to get funding for a public library. It was the culmination of a five-year pursuit by Councilman Ralph Veillard, W.L. Straub (owner of the St. Petersburg Times), and Annie McCrae, (who became the first secretary of the library) in 1913 that the city was awarded a $17,500 grant from the Carnegie Corporation. The grant was approved and matched by the city, and the site on the banks of the city Reservoir (now Mirror Lake) was chosen on July 17, 1914.

The Mirror Lake Community Library is built in the Beaux-Arts style, with sculptural decoration along conservative modern lines, slightly overscaled details, bold sculptural supporting consoles, rich deep cornices, swags and sculptural enrichments. The Beaux- Arts style heavily influenced the architecture of the United States in the period from 1880 to 1920. The building's architect, Henry D. Whitfield worked for the Carnegie Corporation and designed this library, as well as many other Carnegie libraries in this style.

Funding from the Carnegie grant was granted with the intention that libraries built with the money would be racially integrated. However, when the library was opened in 1915, St. Petersburg was still racially segregated, and the city refused black residents access to the library. It was not until 1944 that the city began allowing blacks into the basement of the Carnegie library. Mrs. S.M. Carter, the wife of a pastor, formed an interracial committee, and lobbied the city for funds to open a black library. As a result, the James W. Johnson Library branch was opened as the city's first library for the African American community.

Mirror Lake Library's first librarian was Emma Moore Williams. Before becoming the Sunshine City's first librarian, she was the first English teacher at St. Petersburg's High School (St. Petersburg High School) and is described by the St. Petersburg Times as “a very efficient and popular member of the city school faculty.” William's assistant librarian was Margaret Jenkins, who ran the 4th Street Free Reading Room. William's first act as librarian was to catalog and shelve the 3,000 books brought over from the 4th street reading room.

Annie McRae [McCrae] was offered the position of librarian first, but declined due to “political concerns.” Mrs. McRae was the secretary of the library board and felt there was a conflict of interest in accepting the position. McCrae was a passionate advocate of obtaining a Carnegie library in St. Petersburg, and remained active in working on behalf of the library. She published articles in the St. Petersburg Times in support of the library. In one Times article, “Will St. Pete Finish Its Library Undertaking?” McCrae urged the city to use tax dollars to augment the former reading room's meager 3,000 books. The library was built to house 16,000 volumes. The mission of the library is three-fold, she stated, “It is for information, for recreation, and for inspiration.” Of libraries, she urges, “We cannot accurately trace its influence--it may kindle a train of thought that shall found museums and colleges and hospitals, that shall lead to the production of wonderful inventions that shall inspire noble deed of every kind."

In 1946 Hilda Glaser was appointed as Director of the Library. After assessing the inadequacies of the library facilities she was determined to come up with a plan to seek better library services for the St. Petersburg community. She recommended that the city organize a group of citizens to be known as the “Friends of the Library” which was organized on April 11, 1947. The purpose of the group was to encourage more effective use of the library and assist in planning the expansion of library facilities. The group was granted a corporate charter in 1949 that allowed them to receive gifts and legacies to be put toward the library. Their first achievement was recruiting the help of the Junior League in a new community project- a Bookmobile. The Junior League presented the city with their first bookmobile in February 1949. The bookmobile was in use until December 1962 when it was replaced by a new Mobile Library trailer.

On June 13, 1986, the library was added to the U.S. National Register of Historic Places.

Mirror Lake Community Library was St. Petersburg's only library until the current Main library was built at 3745 9th Avenue in 1964.

== Renovations ==
In the 1980s, the Mirror Lake Community Library fell into a state of extreme disrepair. A faulty air conditioning system, water damage and mold plagued the building. The second floor was accessible only by a small, winding staircase; the main entrance was sealed. The city commissioned a study to determine if the building was fit to continue being used as a library.

In 1987, a plan to restore the library was approved by the City Council. A wing added in 1951 would be removed, and a new wing would be built in its place, and the 1915 building would be restored.

The restoration was delayed by the discovery of unexpected structural damage and wrangling over the city budget; on January 18, 1994, then-mayor David Fischer cut the ribbon to reopen the refurbished 1915 wing of the library. The elevator was not yet installed at this point, and handicap access was still an issue because the ground floor entrance and the 1951 wing were closed.

In 1997, the project was completed and library was expanded with an 8,000 square-foot addition designed to blend harmoniously with the historic exterior and an elevator to make all levels handicap accessible. It reopened with the added wing on May 21, 1997.

== Programs and Services ==
The Mirror Lake Community Library is a branch of The St. Petersburg Library System and a member of the Pinellas Public Library Cooperative. Patrons of this library can borrow books, CDs, DVDs, audiobooks, and magazines. There also a number of online and e-resources that patrons have access to, including Hoopla Digital, OverDrive, Inc., Ancestry.com, and more. Patrons can request items from other Pinellas County Libraries and can fill out requests for interlibrary loans on the library website or in person.

There are a number of programs offered at the Mirror Lake Community Library and a calendar of events is available on their website. Types of programs offered include weekly story times, therapy dog reading sessions, ESL classes, walk-in computer help, meditation classes, and special events sponsored by the Friends of the Library.

There is one meeting room available for library patrons to reserve. Patrons can apply for meeting room access on the library website. Meeting room use is limited to non-profit organizations engaging in library related activities or in educational, cultural, intellectual, charitable, and/or community related activities.
