= Ronald E. Frazier =

American businessman and retired architect

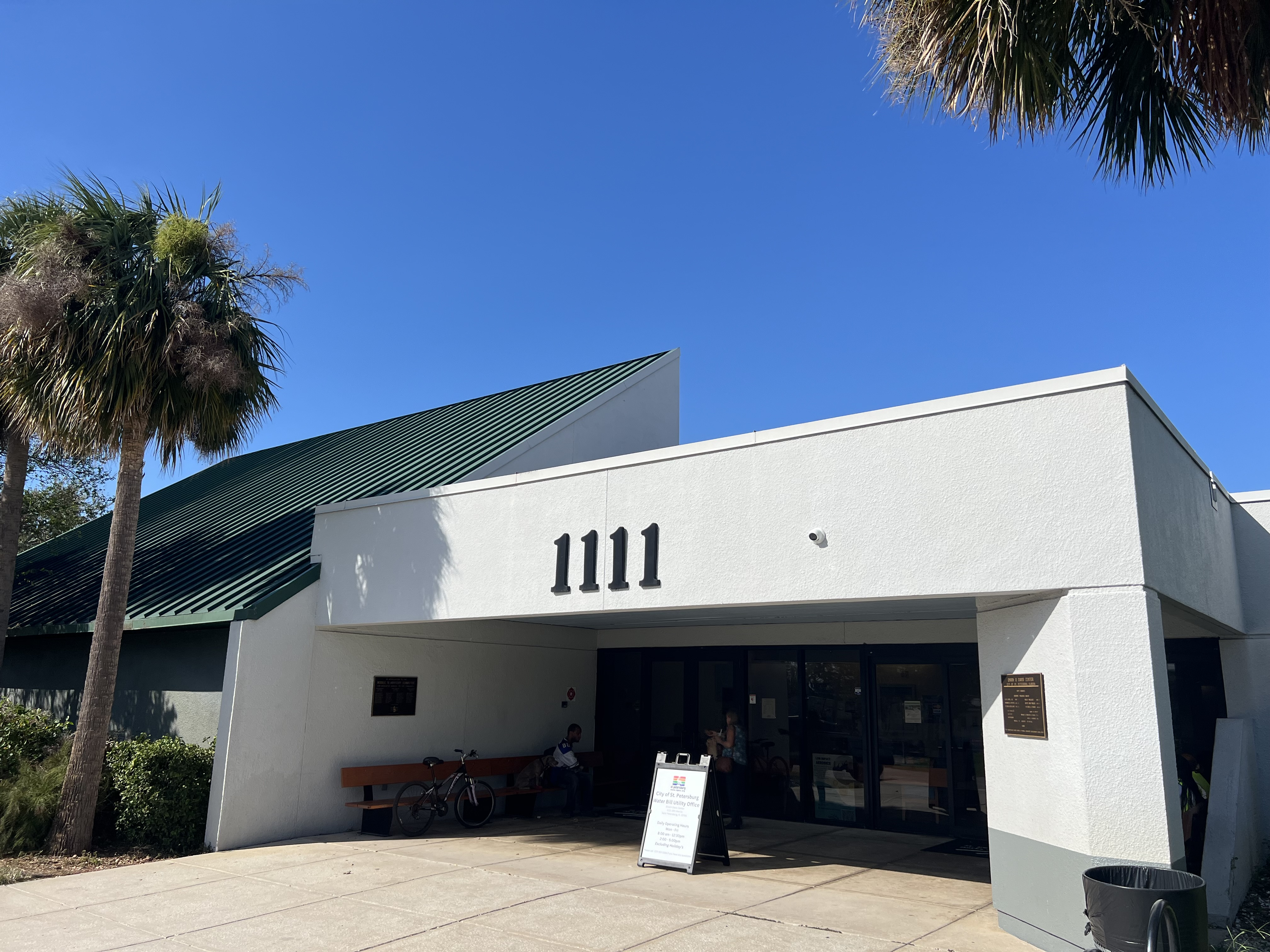
Enoch D. Davis Center in St. Petersburg, Florida

Ronald E. Frazier I is businessman and retired architect based in Miami, Florida. He collaborated on plans for Miami's Heritage Trail under a highway. He is Chairman and CEO of BAC Funding Corporation. He was the second black registered architect in Florida. He incorporated symbolism from Adinkra and Kente cloth designs into his architecture. He served as president of the Miami-Dade Chamber of Commerce. He was an associate professor of architecture at the University of Miami.

== Life ==
Frazier was born in Houston, Texas. He graduated with a Bachelor of Architecture from Howard University and received a Masters in Urban Design and Planning from Catholic University of America. He was as an assistant professor of architecture and planning at Howard University and the University of Miami.

The film The Intention of Design - Building a Legacy was made about his work designing the MLK Office Plaza.

In December 1992, he became a member of the Non-Group (a civically influential group of Miami-Dade business and civic elites).

== Works ==
- Historic Overtown Folklife Village in Overtown (Miami), masterplan
- Enoch D. Davis Center (1981) in St. Petersburg, Florida (named for Enoch Davis
- Dr. Martin Luther King, Jr. Office Plaza (MLK Office Plaza)
