= Non-Group =

Secretive non-government organization in the United States

- Formation: 1971
- Dissolved: 2000s
- Type: local NGO
- Legal status: defunct
- Location: Miami-Dade, Florida, U.S.
- Members: unfixed 12 (1971); 38 (1985); 49 (1988); 52 (1989); 34 (late-1992); 55 (Dec. 1992)

The Non-Group was a largely secretive exclusive formal grouping of Miami businesspeople that played a significant role in guiding local affairs in Greater Miami for decades. The group consisted of well-connected business elite, and was in the 1970s and 1980s widely regarded as the metro-region's main power broker, being described as a "shadow government" of the area. The group's power had somewhat dissipated by the early 1990s, at which time it undertook efforts to demographically diversify its membership and reestablish its dominant influence. The group ultimately disbanded in the early 21st century.

== History ==
In 1971, the Non-Group was formed and began holding monthly meetings. Co-founded and long co-headed by Alvah Chapman Jr. and Harry Hood Bassett, its original membership was twelve businessmen. Chapman and long co-headed the organization together. Its original membership was entirely white and male.

Meetings of the group took place in the form of private dinners for its members, where they would converse and make decisions. There were not committees or staffs for the group, and there were no dues owed by members. For its first decades, the group was the main power broker in Miami affairs. During his mayoralty in the city of Miami, Maurice Ferré (who was previously a member of the Non-Group in the early 1970s) described it as "the shadow government of metropolitan Dade County," explaining, "the system of government we have creates a vacuum that's filled by this group. This is the central power in Miami. This is where things are decided."

As of 1985, the group had 38 members. By 1988, the group had 49 members, but remained mostly Anglo and male. It had only three black members and only two female members. By 1989, the group grew to 52 members. The group was described as "the embodiment of Dade [County] business community." However, in the next several years it greatly contracted as many members retired, died, or left the group on other terms. By the late 1980s, the group was seeing its power lessen by the late-1980s when other organizations centered upon Hispanic leadership began to wield influence, such as the Latin Builders Association and the Cuban American National Foundation. The appearance of sex and racial exclusion this created (which some Non-Group defenders argued was not by intent of the group itself but rather a mere consequence of overall power dynamics in Miami) had by the late-1980s harmed its ability to build coalitions with the increasingly influential Hispanic population in the city. In the early 1990s, a group of local Hispanic business leaders founded their own grouping modeled off of the Non-Group. This group, dubbed Le Mesa Redonda, presented another hispanic force which countered the previous dominance of the Non-Group in city politics. Four individuals held membership in both the Non-Group and Le Mesa Redonda as of April 1992 (Carlos Arboleya, Luis Botifoli, Armando Codina, and Raul Masvidal).

In late 1990, Codina and James Batten became the new co-leaders of the group.

In December 1992, the Non-Group expanded from 34 members to 55 by admitting 21 new members, many of whom belonged to demographics previously underrepresented in the group. This was the largest singular expansion the group had ever made to its membership. The new members included nine hispanic members, six black members, and six anglo members. Two of these new members were women. Five of them were also existing members of Le Mesa Redonda. This membership expansion increased the group's diversity to include a total of twelve hispanic members, nine black members, and four female members.

While still wielding significant influence in the early 1990s, the group saw its power eclipsed by competing organizations.

In 1994, the group made Frank Scruggs Jr. one of its co-chair, marked the first time that an African American had served as a head of the group.

The non-group disbanded in the early 21st century. The group's power had declined in a changing political landscape, with the closed grouping of connected and monied elite having fallen out-of-place against public sentiments that more favored grassroots activism.

== Policies and projects promoted ==
While many non-group lobbying efforts occurred behind-the-scenes and in-secret, others occurred in public view, or were otherwise reported upon.

- "Decade of Progress" bond issue (1972): Supported the successful "yes" campaign for the $553 million "Decade of Progress" bond referendum in 1972. The bond-issue raised revenue for public facility projects (including zoo, library, and hospital projects). Non-Group member Harper Sibley Jr. was the chief fundraiser for the "yes" campaign.
- Miami MetroZoo relocation: campaigned in support of the successful effort to replace the previous zoo location with a new relocated facility
- Metrorail construction (late-1970s): campaigned in support of construction of , including the successful "yes" campaign for the 1978 referendum. The referendum was heavily contested, with approval only narrowly passing. Non-Group member William Colson convinced other Non-Group members to raise funds for the "yes" campaign
- Repairs to damaged areas of Liberty City after the 1980 Miami riots: Non-Group members Frank Borman, Chapman, Colson unsuccessfully lobbied then-governor Bob Graham and the Florida Legislature for the passage a penny sales tax to fund the repair of areas damaged by the riots. After losing this battle, Chapman and fellow Non-Group member Charles I. Babcock Jr. (a construction magnate) enacted a plan which originated in the Non-Group, raising $7 million of private donations to create a loan fund which aided small black-owned businesses with funding repairs.
- Crime reduction and immigration enforcement (1980s):
  - several Non-Group members founded an ran the influential lobbying organization "Miami Citizens Against Crime", which called for increased spending on law enforcement. Between 1981 and late-1985, county funding for criminal justice increased by 59%
  - in December 1981, Non-Group members Borman, Chapman, Richard G. Capen Jr., and Armando Codina visited Washington, D.C., in order to lobby the Reagan administration for federal assistance in decreasing crime and illegal immigration. They met with then-vice president George H. W. Bush and then-presidential advisor Edwin Meese. The following month, President Ronald Reagan established the Organized Crime Drug Enforcement Task Force, chaired by Bush.
- County business license fee increase to fund a local symphony and economic development (1985): the Non-Group successfully lobbied the Metro Commission to double license fees on 100,000 businesses in Dade County in order to raise revenue to fund a local symphony orchestra and economic development projects. The proposal to establish a symphony (which resulted in the New World Symphony) had originated beyond the Non-Group, but gained the Non-Group's support. Members of the Non-Group urged commissioners to approve the tax increase. Companies and organizations led by Non-Group members (including the Miami Herald, Knight-Ridder, Knight Foundation, Ryder System) contributed $1 million in private donations towards a symphony that were instrumental in convincing the county commissioners to approve the tax increase.
- Lobbied for action to combat I-95 robberies (1988): lobbied Governor Bob Graham to develop a plan to address a spree of robberies on Interstate 95
- Promoted re-investment efforts in black neighborhoods of Miami (1992)

== Members ==
Individuals who, at one time, were members of the Non-Group include:

- Horacio Aguirre, Diario Las Américas publisher —joined Non-Group in December 1992
- Bill Allen Jr., chairman of Atico Savings Bank
- Walter Alford, chief executive of Florida Southern Bell
- Carlos Arboleya, banking executive (executive of Barnett Bank), president of the Greater Miami Chamber of Commerce
- Ted Arison, chairman of Carnival Cruise Line
- Reubin Askew, attorney, former Florida governor, 1984 presidential candidate, 1988 U.S. senate candidate
- Charles I. Babcock Jr., construction magnate (chairman of The Babcock Company), president of the Greater Miami Chamber of Commerce, trustee of the University of Miami
- Phil Bakes, president and CEO of Eastern Air Lines
- Harry Hood Bassett, Southeast Banking Corporation chairman, trustee of the University of Miami
- James Batten, president of Knight Ridder
- David Blumberg, real estate mogul (chairman and president of Planned Development Corporation), trustee of the University of Miami
- Thomas R. Bomar, CEO of AmeriFirst Bank
- Frank Borman, chairman of Eastern Air Lines and retired NASA astronaut
- Luis Botifoli, chairman of Republic National Bank
- M. Anthony Burns, chairman of Ryder System Inc.
- Oscar Bustillo Jr., president and CEO of Republic National Bank —joined Non-Group in December 1992
- Frank J. Callahan, chairman of Kendall Foods Corporation, executive of Whittaker Corporation, chairman of the South Florida Regional Planning Council
- Richard G. Capen Jr., CEO and publisher of the Miami Herald, Knight Ridder executive, former U.S. Department of Defense official
- Alvah Chapman Jr., chairman of Knight Ridder, president of the Greater Miami Chamber of Commerce
- Ira C. Clark, president and CEO of Jackson Memorial Hospital —joined Non-Group in December 1992
- Charles E. Cobb, assistant U.S. secretary of commerce, chairman and CEO of the Arvida Disney Corporation, trustee of the University of Miami
- Armando Codina, real estate developer (founder and president of Codina Group), president of the Greater Miami Chamber of Commerce —joined Non-Group in the early 1980s
- William Colson, trial attorney, president of the Greater Miami Chamber of Commerce
- William Collum, president of the Greater Miami Chamber of Commerce
- Carlos de la Cruz, chairman of the Eagle Brands beverage distribution company —joined Non-Group in December 1992
- Maurice Ferré, construction magnate and mayor of Miami member in the early 1970s
- Robert Epling, president of Community Bank of Homestead, president of Orange Bowl Committee, agriculture committee head at We Will Rebuild, former chairman of The Beacon Council —joined Non-Group in December 1992
- Martin Fine, lawyer
- Edward T. Foote II, president of University of Miami
- Ronald E. Frazier, businessman and architect (president of Ronald E. Frazier Associates) —joined Non-Group in December 1992
- Lester Freeman, president of Central Corp.
- Hugh Gentry, president and CEO of Barnett Bank
- R. Ray Goode, president of The Babcock Company, former Dade County government manager, trustee of the University of Miami
- Barbara Gothard, public relations executive (president of Gothard Group) and secretary of We Will Rebuild —joined Non-Group in December 1992
- Adolpho Henriques, senior executive at NationsBank —joined Non-Group in December 1992
- H.C. "Buddy" Henry Jr., vice president of Florida Southern Bell
- Francisco Jose Hernandez, president of Agro-Tech International and founder of the Cuban American National Foundation
- Theodore Hoepner, SunTrust Bank executive
- Ed Houston, president and CEO of South Florida Savings Bank
- John J. Hudiburg, chairman and CEO of Florida Power & Light
- Wayne Huizenga, chairman and CEO of Blockbuster Entertainment Corporation, owner of Florida Marlins, owner of Florida Panthers, co-owner of the Miami Dolphins —joined Non-Group in December 1992
- Dewey W. Knight Jr., former deputy county manager, consultant (at Dewey Knight Company) —joined Non-Group in December 1992
- George F. Knox, prominent attorney, former Miami city attorney, former member of the Greater Miami Convention & Visitors Bureau —joined Non-Group in December 1992
- Maria Camila Leiva, executive of the Miami Free Zone Corporation, former president of World Trade Center Miami —joined Non-Group in December 1992
- Modesto Maidique, president of Florida International University, chairman of the Beacon Council Miami Free Zone Corporation —joined Non-Group in December 1992
- Raul Masvidal, banking magnate and 1985 mayoral election runner-up —joined Non-Group in the early 1980s
- Robert McCabe, president of Miami-Dade Community College —joined Non-Group in December 1992
- Jesse J. McCrary Jr., attorney
- Richard W. McEwen, retired chairman of Burdines
- James McLamore, chairman emiritus of Burger King
- Hank Meyer, publicist (president of Hank Meyer Associates)
- Carlos Migoya, executive of First Union National Bank of Florida —joined Non-Group in December 1992
- Leonard M. Miller, president of Lennar
- Jeanne O'Laughlin, president of Barry University
- Charles Olcott, president of Burger King USA, CEO of Burger King
- Leslie V. Pantin, public relations executive (president of Pantin Partnership Inc.) and founding president of the Kiwanis Club's Little Havana chapter —joined Non-Group in December 1992
- David L. Paul, real estate developer and founder of CenTrust Bank —joined Non-Group in November 1988
- Garth C. Reeves Sr., The Miami Times publisher
- Joe Robbie, Miami Dolphins team owner
- Willie C. Robinson, president of Florida Memorial College
- Ralph Sanchez, president of Miami Motorsports, founder of the Grand Prix of Miami —joined Non-Group in December 1992
- Frank Scruggs Jr., attorney lawyer (partner at Steel, Hector & Davis), former Florida secretary of labor —joined Non-Group in December 1992
- Harper Sibley Jr., chairman of FMI Financial
- Howard Socol, chairman and CEO of Burdines
- Stewart P. Thomas, general manager of Sears, president of the Greater Miami Chamber of Commerce
- Robert H. Traurig, attorney (co-founder of Greenberg Traurig)
- David Weaver, chairman and CEO of Intercap Investments, chairman of the Greater Miami Chamber of Commerce, trustee of the University of Miami
- Dorothy Weaver, president of the Greater Miami Chamber of Commerce
- Sherwood M. "Woody" Weisner, chairman and CEO of The Continental Companies, chairman of the New World Symphony —joined Non-Group in December 1992
- Norman Weldon, business executive (president of Cordis, president of Corvita)
- Ed Williamson, automobile dealership executive (president of Williamson Cadillac), executive at We Will Rebuild, vice president of Orange Bowl Committee
- Alexander McWhorter Wolfe Jr., vice chairman of Southeast Banking Corporation
- Charles Zwick, chairman and CEO of Southeast Banking Corporation, former director of the federal Bureau of the Budget
