= James Weldon Johnson Community Library =

- 27.75251°N 82.64946°W
- Location: 1059 18th Ave. South St. Petersburg, FL 33705
- Branch of: St. Petersburg Library System

Other information
- Website: splibraries.org/johnson_library.html

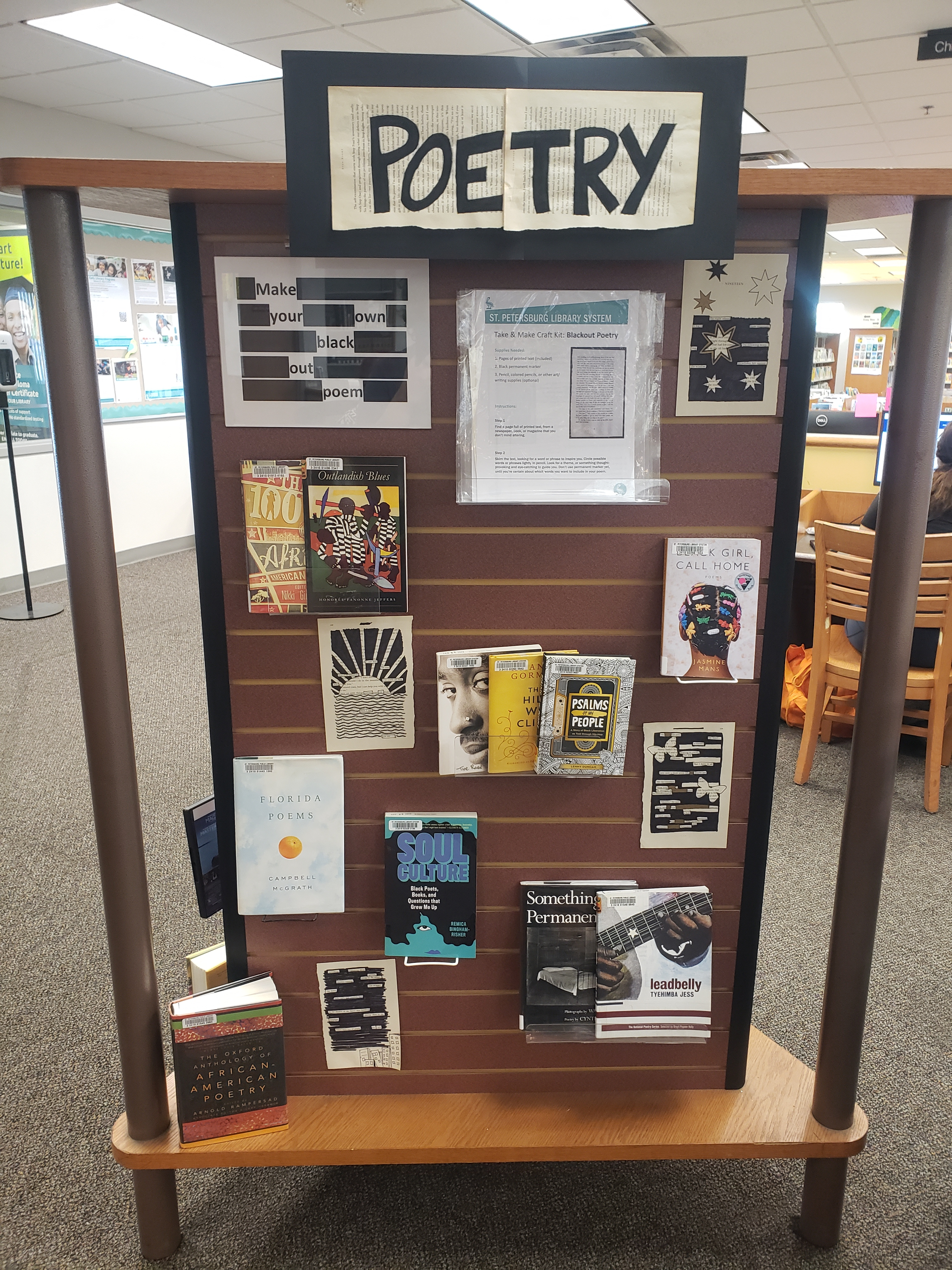
The book display for National Poetry Month at Johnson Community Library, April 2024.

The James Weldon Johnson Community Library is a public library located in St. Petersburg, Florida. It is a branch of the St. Petersburg Library System, which services a large area in southern Pinellas County, Florida. African Americans were barred from using the Carnegie Library built in 1915. In 1944 they were granted access to its basement and in 1945 a separate library was established for black patrons. The current library was designed by Miami architect Charles Canerday & Associates. It was built in 2002.

== Services and programs ==
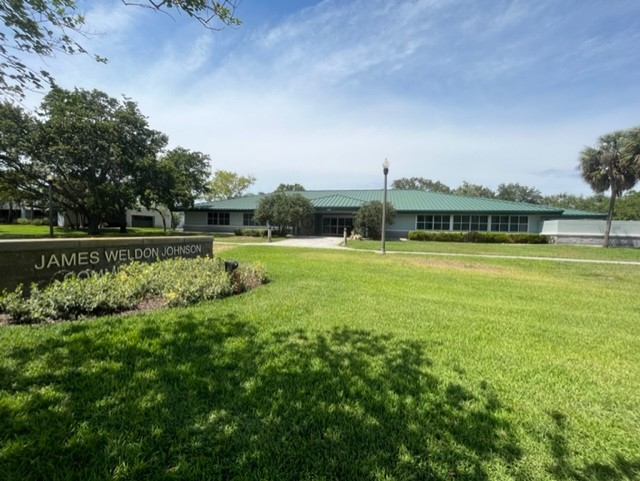
James Weldon Johnson Community Library, Saint Petersburg FL, Taken 4/28/2023

James Weldon Johnson Community Library is a member of the Pinellas Public Library Cooperative and the St. Petersburg Library System. Library patrons may borrow books, CDs, DVDs, audiobooks, magazines and request items be put on hold from libraries throughout Pinellas County. In addition, Interlibrary loan requests are available to patrons on the library's website or in person.

Free Wi-Fi is available, as well as public computers. Printing, copying, scanning and fax service is available for a small charge. Remote printing is currently not available at this time within the Saint Petersburg Library System.

Prior to the President Barack Obama Main Library renovations, there were two meeting rooms available for library patrons to reserve. Patrons could apply for meeting room access on the library website. Meeting room use is limited to non-profit organizations engaging in library related activities or in educational, cultural, intellectual, charitable, and/or community related activities. As of March 24, 2023 these rooms are currently unavailable to the public because they are used for staffing offices.

As of March 2016, the library has a seed library where patrons can use their library card to check out various vegetable and plant seeds.

The James Weldon Johnson Community Library has a makerspace which was officially unveiled to the public at the 2023 Literacy Festival. The makerspace contains technology, equipment, and software such as sewing machines, Raspberry pi computers, microphones, and the Adobe Creative Suite.

Programs for adults, teens, and children are offered at the library. The regular programs currently include weekly story times, the S.T.R.E.A.M. Club for Grades 3-5, Dance, Baby, Dance! for infants up to 18 months with a caregiver, and Teen gaming. There are also special events that include various guest speakers.

A computer literacy course is also available for patrons at the South Community Library within the St. Petersburg Library System.

== History ==
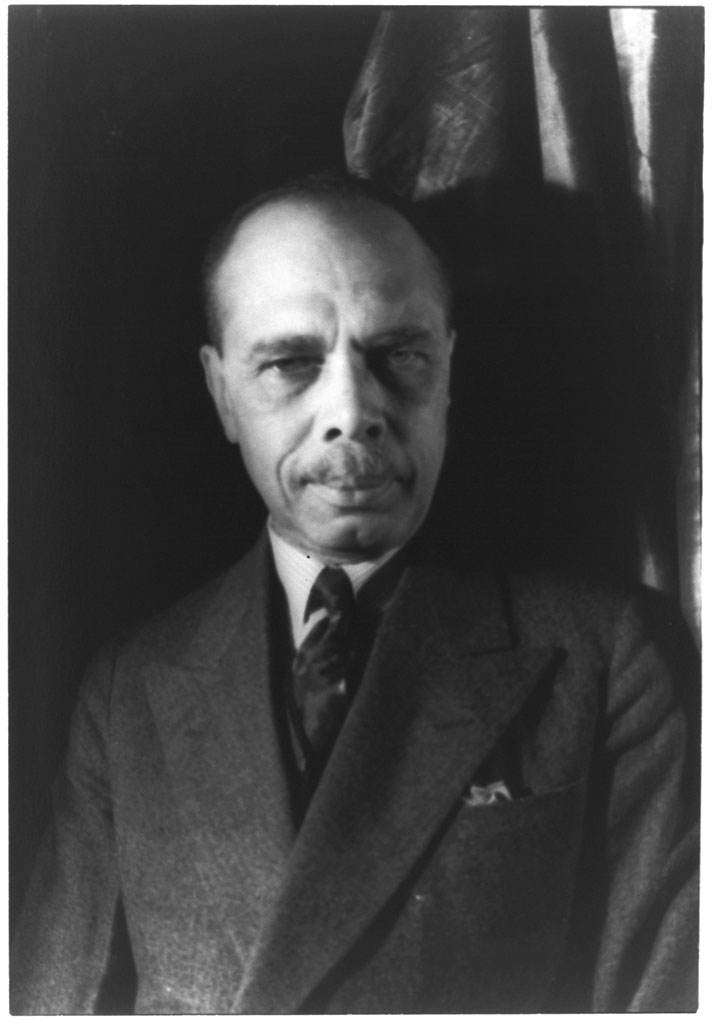
James Weldon Johnson in 1932

James Weldon Johnson Community Library is named after James Weldon Johnson, native Floridian author, educator, civil rights activist, head of the NAACP. His song "Lift Every Voice and Sing" is considered by many to be the "Negro National Anthem."

Andrew Carnegie intended for the library he funded in St. Petersburg to be racially integrated when it opened in 1915, but the city refused black residents access to the library. In 1944, the city began allowing blacks into only the basement of the Carnegie library. Mrs. S. M. Carter, wife of a pastor, formed an interracial committee and lobbied the city for funds to open a black library.

On April 1, 1947 the James Weldon Johnson Library opened in a leased space on 1035 Third Ave. S. The original location was a 1,025 square foot room on the ground floor of the Masonic Lodge. It served the community at the Third Avenue location until 1979, when it was closed because of the city’s urban redevelopment project, which displaced hundreds of black residents from the Gas Plant area.

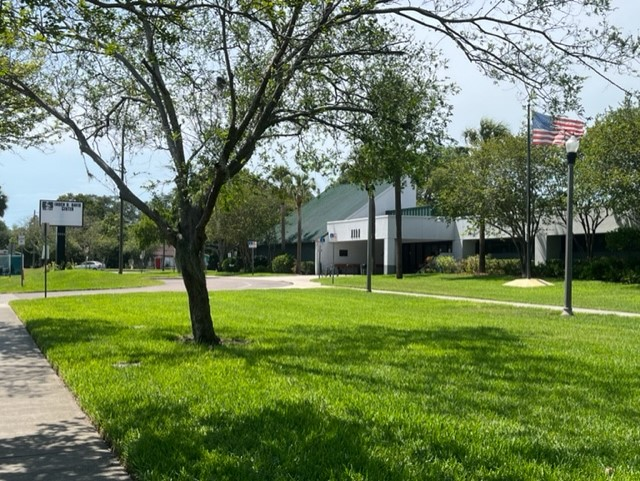
Enoch D. Davis Center, Saint Petersburg, FL, Taken 4/28/2023

In 1981, the James Weldon Branch reopened in the newly built Enoch Davis Center (named for Enoch Davis) at 1111 18th Ave. S. Of the city’s five public libraries, the Johnson branch was the only one housed within the confines of another building. In 1990, there were rumors that the library was going to be closed due to funding cuts. Community leaders formed the James Weldon Johnson Friends of the Library, Inc. and circulated a successful petition to save the library.

In the summer of 2002, the Johnson Branch Library moved into its current location at 1059 18th Ave. South on property next to the Enoch Davis Center. The $2.7 million, 14,500-square-foot building housing about 40,000 volumes was the materialization of the dream of the Enoch Davis Expansion Task Force. The current building was designed by Canerday, Belfsky + Arroyo Architects.

The Friends continue to support the library and host the Annual James Weldon Johnson Community Library Literacy Festival each March.
