= St. Petersburg Library System =

Coordinates: 27.7809°N 82.6842°W

The St. Petersburg Library System is a free public library system for residents of the city of St. Petersburg, Florida, located in Pinellas County. The St. Petersburg Library System is part of the Pinellas Public Library Cooperative and consists of 7 branch locations.

== History ==
The city received its first library, the St. Petersburg Public Library (now the Mirror Lake Community Library) in 1915 through a grant awarded by the Carnegie Corporation of New York. This was one of only 10 libraries in Florida to receive Carnegie funding. The $17,500 Carnegie grant was approved and matched by the city and the Mirror Lake site chosen on July 17, 1914. It was opened on December 1, 1915. The Mirror Lake Branch is also significant to the city's architectural history for being one of the earliest Beaux Arts style buildings designed in this area. In 1951 a modern addition was added onto the original Carnegie building, and again in 1991.

Andrew Carnegie intended for the library he funded in downtown St. Petersburg to be racially integrated when it opened in 1915, but the city refused black residents access to the library. In 1944, the city began allowing blacks into only the basement of the Carnegie library. Mrs. S.M. Carter, wife of a pastor, formed an interracial committee and lobbied the city for funds to open a black library. In 1947 the James W. Johnson Library branch opened as the city's first library for the African American community, as they were previously not allowed at the Mirror Lake Library. The James Weldon Johnson Community Library was relocated from its original location in the Gas Plant district due to the city's urban redevelopment project (which displaced many black residents). In 1981, the Johnson Community Library reopened in the Enoch Davis Center where it was located until 2002, when the current location was built. The Johnson Community Library is currently located next door to the Enoch Davis Center.

The city finished building the Main Library in 1964 to serve as a central midtown location. In 2009, the Main Library underwent a $1.2 million interior renovation, which included the addition of 67 new computers. The North Community Library was constructed in 1973 after the city acquired the land. The South Community Library, previously independently housed in the Boyd Hill Nature Center, became part of the city's system in 2002 along with the Johnson Branch, with both libraries receiving new facilities between 13,500 feet and 14,700 feet.

The West Community Library at St. Petersburg College, a joint-use facility that serves both public patrons and SPC students, opened in 2005, replacing the Azalea branch. The Childs Park Community Library is the newest addition to the St. Petersburg Library System, which opened in 2009, located inside the Childs Park YMCA

In 2018, Mayor Rick Kriseman proposed that the Main Library be renamed after Barack Obama. The city council approved the change later that year, along with $6 million in renovations funded through the "Penny for Pinellas" tax. The library was formally dedicated as the President Barack Obama Main Library in February 2021, with a sign installation during a Black History Month dedication ceremony. After extensive renovations, the newly remodeled library officially reopened to the public on September 27, 2025.

== Branches ==
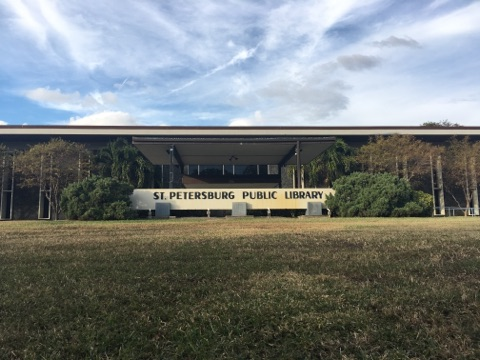
The front of the St. Petersburg Main Library, taken from 9th Ave. Nov 2016.

- President Barack Obama Main Library
- Childs Park Community Library
- James Weldon Johnson Community Library
- Mirror Lake Community Library
- North Community Library
- South Community Library
- West Community Library at St. Petersburg College Gibbs Campus

== Programs and Services ==
In addition to borrowing books, DVDs, CDs, and other items, patrons have many other resources and services available through the St. Petersburg Library System and Pinellas Public Library Cooperative. Each branch location offers free Wi-Fi and desktop computers for patron use, as well as printing, faxing, and copying services for a fee and free scanning. The St. Petersburg Library System also offers Wi-Fi hotspots for checkout. Patrons can download and stream digital resources, such as ebooks, audiobooks, and movies, using cloudLibrary, Hoopla, OverDrive, Inc., RBdigital, and Tumblebooks. The Pinellas Public Library Cooperative has also paired up with local museums to provide museum passes that are available for checkout by patrons and their families for free.

Research databases are available to patrons both through the library website and on the desktop computers at each branch. Databases include ProCitizen (both in English and Spanish), Florida Electronic Library, Gale Databases, Ancestry.com, LinkedIn Learning, AtoZdatabases, and an archive of the Tampa Bay Times. The St. Petersburg Library System is a Federal Depository Library. Government documents are available to patrons at the James Weldon Johnson Community Library.

Each branch offers programs for children, teens, and adults, including computer classes, health insurance information sessions, job search assistance, book clubs, and story times. An updated schedule of programs and events, as well as contact information, is available on the library system's website.

Other services include the Pinellas Talking Book Library, Ask a Librarian, Interlibrary loans, Libraries Unshelved, Microfilm/Microfiche, and Obituary Research.
