= Francisco Jose Hernandez =

Cuban dissident

Francisco José Hernández, known as "Pepe", (Havana, 1 September 1936) is a Cuban exile of the 1960s, anti-Castro, and Bay of Pigs Invasion participant who is co-founder and president of the Cuban American National Foundation that claims to be taking a less overt position against the Cuban form of government.

Hernández founded Agro-Tech International. He also founded the Cuban American National Foundation. He was also a member of the Non-Group, a civically influential group of Miami-Dade business and civc elites.

== Controversy ==
Francisco Jose ‘Pepe’ Hernandez is said to have admitted serving the Central Intelligence Agency, but indicated that he did not consider himself or his cousin Luis Posada Carriles to be terrorists. In 1997, a boat captained by militant Cuban exiles on the way to Venezuela was intercepted by the Coast Guard off the coast of Puerto Rico. Hidden in the hull of the vessel was a small arsenal including a .50 caliber Barrett assault rifle registered to Hernandez, according to an FBI report. They admitted that they were going to Venezuela to attempt to assassinate Fidel Castro with the weapon.
