= Robert McCabe =

American educator (1928–2014)

President Emeritus of Miami-Dade Community College

Robert H. McCabe (December 23, 1928 – December 23, 2014) was an American educator and the President Emeritus of Miami-Dade Community College. He won a 1992 MacArthur Fellowship. He died on December 23, 2014, of cancer.

In December 1992, McCabe became a member of the Non-Group (a civically influential group of Miami-Dade business and civic elites).

== Works ==
- No One to Waste: A Report to Public Decision-Makers and Community College Leaders, Community College Press, 2000, ISBN 978-0-87117-330-0
- General education in a changing society, Kendall/Hunt Pub. Co., 1978, ISBN 978-0-8403-7503-2
