= Dewey W. Knight Jr. =

American county administrator (1929–1995)

- Born: April 7, 1929; Daytona Beach, Florida, US
- Died: June 21, 1995 (aged 76)
- Education: Bachelors at Bethune-Cookman College in 1951, Masters at Atlanta University
- Occupation: Deputy County Manager of Miami-Dade County
- Spouse: Clara Louise Brown
- Children: Dewey III and Patrick

Dewey Willard Knight Jr. (April 7, 1929 – June 21, 1995) was the first black social worker for Kendall Children's Home in Miami, Dewey W. Knight Jr. was considered a pioneer for his work in the early 1960s. Dewey continued his work throughout the 1960s and became the first black department director and the only black Deputy County Manager in Miami-Dade County administration's history.

== Biography ==
=== Early life and education ===
Dewey Knight Jr. was born and raised in Daytona Beach, where he also spent most of his childhood. from an early age, he was determined early on to make a difference in the world and long before the Civil Rights marches of the 1960s, he earned a Bachelor of Science degree from Bethune-Cookman College in 1951. Knight as a Daytona Beach native who earned a B.S. degree in Business Administration from Bethune-Cookman College in 1951.

While at college, Knight joined Kappa Alpha Psi fraternity He then served a four-year tour in the United States Air Force and then returned to complete his master's degree in social work from Atlanta University, which he finished in 1957. Knight as a Daytona Beach native who earned a B.S. degree in Business Administration from Bethune-Cookman College in 1951. After a four-year tour of duty in the U.S. Air Force, he returned to school and earned a master's degree in social work from Atlanta University in 1957.

=== Professional career and achievements ===
Knight is best known for his devotion of his time to improving the lives of the underprivileged. It is documented that he turned down offers to become the County Manager for Dade County, in order to continue serving those who needed him more directly. He moved up to management positions and became the county's first black deputy county manager and assistant county manager.

As the voice of reason during times of social and political unrest, Dewey Knight played a pivotal role in quelling the Miami riots of 1980.

He began his career in social work in a professional setting at the Kendall Children's Home in Miami, Florida in 1959. He was a caseworker who cared for the welfare of children and families throughout that community. He was noted for helping the voiceless, commitment for charity in his region, honesty and integrity. To honor his efforts, a "Dewey W. Knight, Jr./Ann-Marie Adker Fair Housing Center" was established in his honor.

While he was a caseworker and the first black social worker for Kendall Children's Home, he helped to integrate the local youth home, despite threats of jail time from local courts while doing so.

Knight eventually rose to the rank of department director for the Welfare Department. He was the first black individual to hold such a high position within the social services department in Dade County. His focus turned to providing intensive counseling for individuals as well as families on welfare and he opened the first Neighborhood Youth Cooperation Program that served out-of-school youth. He also established a residence home and halfway house for troubled teens.

In 1969, he took on the interim role of head of the Division of Youth Services. He was heavily involved in the new War on Poverty program established by the federal government and also took on the challenge of working with the Neighborhood Development Program.

In 1970, Knight accepted the role of Acting Director of Housing and Urban Development. In the same year, he was appointed Assistant County Manager—the first black person to command this post.

While serving as assistant county manager, organized the Department of Human Resources and began the process for what would become the Elderly Services Program. He served as acting County Manager in 1976, 1987, and 1988 and was promoted to First Deputy County Manager in 1985. He served more than 1.8 million residents of Dade County. He was and remains the only black person to ever hold this position. Knight, who retired in 1988, began his 29-year service in Dade County government as a social worker for the welfare agency. He quickly moved up to management positions and became the county's first black deputy county manager and assistant county manager.

Dewey W. Knight Jr. was offered the position of County Manager several times throughout the years, though he chose to not accept, citing family as his main priority.

In December 1992, Knight became a member of the Non-Group (a civically influential group of Miami-Dade business and civic elites).

Also important to note is that Dewey Knight Jr. founded The National Association of Black Public Administrators, (NABPA).

He is also one of only three Distinguished Public Servants to have their portrait displayed in the Miami-Dade County Stephen P. Clark Government Center.

=== Additional work ===
As a clinical professor at Barry University's Graduate School of Social Work, Knight served his community and its people in more ways than just professional. At Barry University, he taught and mentored upcoming administrators within the industry. His commitment to social work and community service programs earned him a good reputation throughout Dade County and his impact stretched far beyond the county limits. Though he could well afford it with his rise in the ranks, Knight, a widower, never moved from his Liberty City home, where he raised his family and helped his neighbors.

=== Personal life ===
Knight married Clara Louise Brown and moved to her original birthplace of Miami in 1959. He and Clara had two sons, Dewey III and Patrick. Despite his social and professional successes, he continued to live in the same community, surrounded by the people that he not only served, but also considered friends and family, for the entirety of his life. Knight moved to Miami, birthplace of his wife, Clara Louise Brown, in 1959. His first job was at the Kendall Children's Home. A dynamic employee who was deeply concerned with children and families, he quickly rose from his first position as a caseworker to become the first black social worker for that agency. Knight also Joined the Alpha Rho boule of Sigma Pi Phi fraternity .

=== Death ===
Dewey W. Knight Jr. died on June 21, 1995.

== Recognition ==
His memory was honored on February 23, 1996, with the dedication of the Dewey W. Knight Jr. Family Medical Center. This walk-in minor emergency care center opened by North Shore Hospital serves the community.

There is a scholarship program in his honor at the Florida International University.

State Road 112 between I-95 and Miami International Airport was renamed Dewey Knight Jr. Memorial Highway in his honor.

== Sources ==
- “Dewey Knight, inspiration to many,” by Silvia M. Unzera, Letter to the Editor, The Miami Herald.
