= Zayira Jordán Conde =

Zayira Jordán Conde is a Puerto Rican academic administrator serving as president of University of Puerto Rico.

At Iowa State University, Jordán Conde completed a bachelor's degree in journalism, a master's degree in anthropology, and a doctorate in human–computer interaction.

She began her career as a reporter. She specializes in cybersecurity and human–computer interaction. She held teaching and research roles at Iowa State University and the Polytechnic University of Puerto Rico.

Jordán Conde was the Movimiento Victoria Ciudadana candidate in the 2020 Puerto Rican general election for Resident Commissioner.

In 2023, she became president of Atlantic University. She became president of the University of Puerto Rico in 2025.
