= 2020 New Progressive Party of Puerto Rico primaries =

- August 9 and 16, 2020
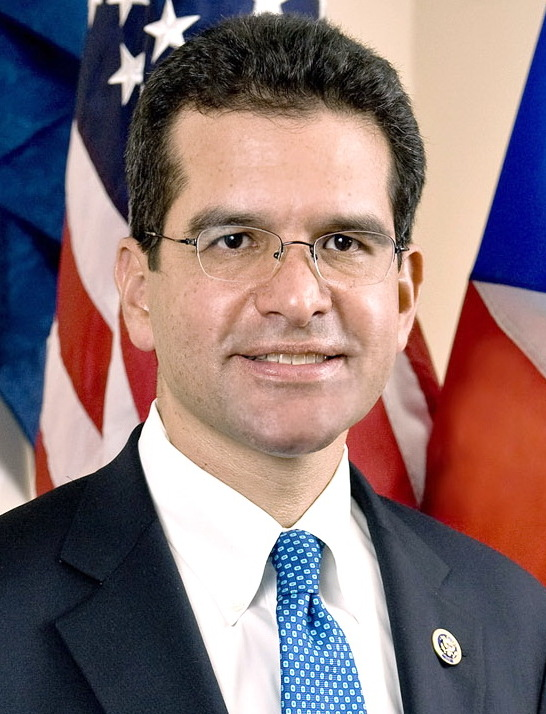

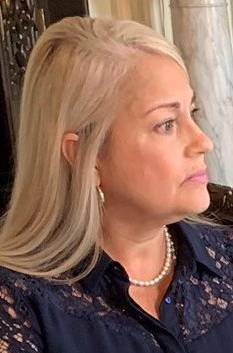
Nominee	Pedro Pierluisi	Wanda Vázquez Garced
Party	New Progressive	New Progressive
Alliance	Democratic	Republican
Popular vote	134,330	97,641
Percentage	57.91%	42.09%
- Results by county or municipality
Previous New Progressive Party nominee for Governor of Puerto Rico
Ricardo Rosselló
2020 New Progressive Party nominee for Governor of Puerto Rico
Pedro Pierluisi

The 2020 New Progressive Party primaries was the primary elections by which voters of the New Progressive Party (PNP) chose its nominees for various political offices of Puerto Rico for 2020. The primaries, originally scheduled for June 2020, were delayed until August 9, 2020, due to the COVID-19 pandemic. The August 9 elections, however, were marred by a lack of ballots leading a suspension of the election; polling locations that could not open on August 9 were scheduled to be open for voting on August 16. The winner for the party's nomination for Governor of Puerto Rico is Pedro Pierluisi, former Resident Commissioner of Puerto Rico and acting Governor after Ricardo Rosselló's resignation, over incumbent Governor Wanda Vázquez Garced.

== Candidates ==
=== Governor ===
- Wanda Vázquez Garced, incumbent Governor
- Pedro Pierluisi, former Resident Commissioner of Puerto Rico

==== Withdrawn ====
- Ricardo Rosselló, former Governor of Puerto Rico
- Iván González Cancel, former Secretary of Health of Puerto Rico and PNP candidate for the 2012 Puerto Rico gubernatorial election

=== Resident Commissioner ===
- Jenniffer González, incumbent Resident Commissioner

=== Senate ===
The PNP holds 21 seats in the Senate of Puerto Rico, 6 at-large seats and 15 district seats.

=== House of Representatives ===
The PNP holds 34 seats in the House of Representatives of Puerto Rico.

== Opinion polling ==
=== Governor ===
Poll source	Date(s) administered	Sample size (Note: Key: A – all adults RV – registered voters LV – likely voters V – unclear)	Margin of error	Wanda Vázquez	Pedro Pierluisi	Other	Undecided
Radio Isla	July 28–August 3, 2020	≈295 (LV) (Note: 30% of a full sample of 983 likely voters)	–	49%	45%	—	6%
Becaon Research/Puerto Rico Herald	July 20–26, 2020	≈289 (V) (Note: 36% of a full sample of 802 voters)	–	43%	43%	–	13% (Note: Includes "refused")
Beacon Research/Puerto Rico Herald	May 3–7, 2020	≈316 (LV) (Note: 35% of a full sample of 903 likely voters)	–	45%	40%	–	15%
Diario Las Américas	March 30-April 21, 2020	— (RV) (Note: PNP subsample of 1500 registered voter sample)	—	52%	36%	1%	11%
Beacon Research/Puerto Rico Herald	March, 2020	– (V) (Note: Not yet released)	–	37%	49%	–	13%
Beacon Research/Puerto Rico Herald	February, 2020	– (V)	–	28%	61%	–	11%
El Nuevo Día	February 21–25, 2020	247 (RV)	± 6.2%	48%	47%	2% (Note: "Other candidate" with 2%; "refused" and would not vote with 0%)	3%

== Results ==
=== Governor ===
New Progressive Party primary results
Party	Candidate	Votes	%
New Progressive	Pedro Pierluisi	162,345	57.67%
New Progressive	Wanda Vázquez Garced (incumbent)	119,184	42.33%
Total votes		281,529	100.00%

== See also ==
- 2020 Popular Democratic Party of Puerto Rico primaries
