= Horacio Aguirre =

American editor of Spanish language newspaper

Horacio Aguirre y Baca
- Born: Horácio Rito Aguirre y Baca; 20 April 1925; New Orleans, Louisiana, US
- Died: 8 September 2017 (aged 92); Miami, Florida, US
- Occupations: Newspaper editor, community activist
- Years active: 1953–2012
- Known for: Diario Las Américas
- Spouse: Helen Craigie Mayorga
- Children: Horacio Stuart, Carmen Mar¡a, Helen, Alejandro, Marta, Carlos
- Parents: Horacio Aguirre y Muñoz (father); Pilar Josefina Baca (mother)

Horacio Aguirre (20 April 1925 – 9 September 2017) was editor-in-chief of the first Spanish-language newspaper on the East Coast, Diario Las Américas that provided local and Latin American news to Spanish speakers in the southeast US and the Caribbean. His obituary in the Miami Herald said his "historic and emblematic leadership of Diario las Américas earned him the sobriquet civilian hero of this city."

== Early life ==
Aguirre was born in 1925 New Orleans, the third child of Pilar Josefina Baca y Herdocia and Horacio Aguirre y Muñoz, both Nicaraguan nationals. His father was a retired Army General and statesman who had become a political refugee due to the United States occupation of Nicaragua. He grew up in Leon, Nicaragua, and at age 18 he was working for the Guardia Nacional in Managua. He attended the University of Panama and earned a degree in political science. He was a law student in May 1947 when he flew from Balboa, Panama to New Orleans to establish permanent residence in the US. He returned to the university and finished his law degree. He began working in journalism writing editorials for Panama America in 1948. Aguirre met and began dating Helen Craigie Mayorga, an American citizen, in Managua. The couple married on November 17, 1949, in Richmond, Virginia. They settled in Panama and began a family, then moved to Miami Shores in Florida in 1953.

== Career ==
With its large Hispanic population, Miami has been referred to as the Gateway to Latin America due to the size of their cultural and commercial ties to Latin America. Aguirre recognized the need to communicate news and ideas to Spanish-speaking immigrants and citizens alike. Horacio and Dr. Francisco Aguirre y Baca, his brother started the newspaper, Diaro las Américas on Independence Day in 1953. The date was not a coincidence. Aguirre explained the reason in a 1993 Miami Herald column, To Know the Essence of Democracy: "We deliberately selected one of the great days in the history of freedom. What we offer here (Greater Miami) is so many cultures, so many opportunities. We need to create an atmosphere where everyone is respected."

Dr. Francisco served as publisher and Horacio was editor-in-chief, writing all the paper's editorials. Horacio's passion for democratic standards and freedom of the spoken and written word was demonstrated by his civic and professional work in national, international and regional institutions.

=== Professional affiliations ===
- Inter-American Press Association, member & president 1983-1984
- World Press Freedom Committee, executive committee
- Association of Cuban Journalists in Exile, member
- World Association of Newspapers, member
- American Society of Newspaper Editors, member
- International Press Institute, member

=== Humor ===
Readers would jokingly refer to Diaro as "the newspaper of today, with the date of tomorrow and the news of yesterday". The reason being the newspaper is printed in late afternoon, delivered to readers with tomorrow's date in print.

== Civic contributions ==
In 1992, Aguirre joined the influential Non-Group, an influential grouping of Miami business.

Aguirre expressed his appreciation of the arts, literature and Hispanic culture by supporting many organizations that benefited from his support for many years. He loved Nicaragua, his native country; the United States, his adopted country; and Spain, which was close to his heart. A long-time columnist for Diario stated,

"Dr. Aguirre had been the center of activity for the Hispanic-American community in South Florida for decades. Every patriotic, social or charitable organization coveted space in his newspaper because it was such a well-read and respected paper. Elected officials sought the endorsement of Diario and would highlight this endorsement in campaign mailings. Aguirre was a champion for the multicultural community in Miami and the community revered him as a significant voice. Under Dr. Aguirre’s hands-on guidance, the meetings of anti-Castro groups would be prominently displayed in Diario. Aguirre was...considered by many to be an honorary Cuban. He was the epitome of a gracious, bygone era of good manners and civility."

A petition was filed and Aguirre became a naturalized citizen on January 22, 1986.

=== Leadership ===
- Florida Grand Opera, board of directors vice president
- Miami Art Museum, board of trustees
- Miami River Commission, chairman

== Honors & awards ==
- Latin Chamber of Commerce, honorary president
- Miami International Press Club, Good News Award (1999)
- St. Thomas University, honorary doctorate (1976)
- Barry University, honorary doctorate (1997)
- Great Floridian, (2001)

== Death ==
His son Carlos Ricardo died in 2002 and his wife in 2014. Guirre died at age 92 on 8 September 2017 at his home after a brief illness.
