= Alvah Chapman Jr. =

American newspaper publisher

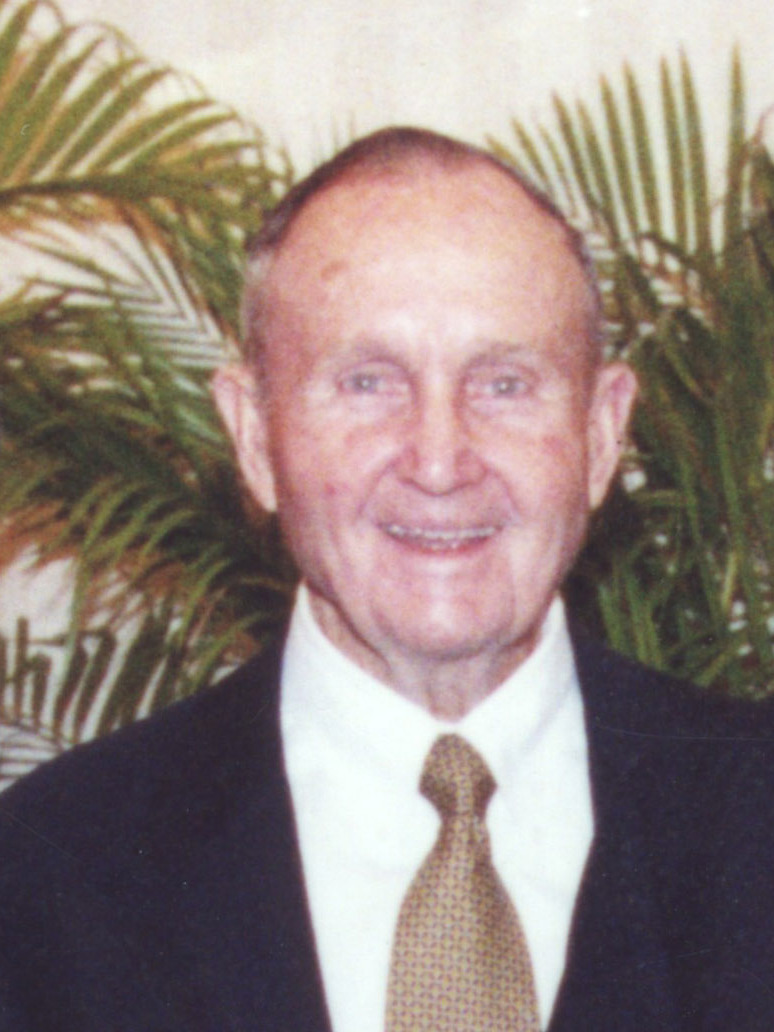
- Chapman in 2000.
- Born: March 21, 1921; Columbus, Georgia
- Died: December 25, 2008 (aged 87)

Alvah Herman Chapman Jr. (March 21, 1921 – December 25, 2008) was an American newspaper publisher who served at the helm of The Miami Herald and as chairman of the Knight Ridder newspaper division.

== Biography ==
Chapman was born in Columbus, Georgia on March 21, 1921. His family owned the R. W. Page Corporation, which owned the Columbus Ledger-Enquirer among other publications. His father was chosen as publisher of The Bradenton Evening Herald, and he moved to Florida with his family when he was five years old. He was editor of the student yearbook and quarterback on the football team in high school.

He attended The Citadel, graduating with a business degree in 1942; at the age of 19 he was named Regimental Commander, the highest-ranking member of the Corps of Cadets. He endowed the Alvah H. Chapman chair in business management at his alma mater in 1989.

During World War II he served as a Boeing B-17 Flying Fortress pilot with the 401st Bomb Group based at RAF Deenethorpe, England flying 37 missions over Europe. By age 23 he was Commander of the 614th Bomb Squadron; during one mission in which two of his plane's four engines caught fire, he was able to land his plane safely. Chapman received three awards of the Distinguished Flying Cross and six Air Medals.

=== Newspapers and publishing ===
After returning from military service, Chapman was hired by the Ledger-Enquirer, where he ultimately became the paper's business manager. Chapman was hired in 1953 as the executive vice president and general manager of the St. Petersburg Times, where he introduced a profit sharing program and developed metrics for employee performance. He and partner Mills B. Lane Jr. purchased the Morning News and the Savannah Evening Press, creating the Savannah Morning News and Press, which they sold in 1960.

Chapman was hired by The Miami Herald in August 1960 to serve as assistant to James L. Knight, who was then serving as general manager of The Herald and executive vice president of Knight Newspapers. The Herald appointed Chapman as its president in 1969. In 1974, he played a major role in the merger of Knight Newspapers and Ridder Publications, the biggest newspaper combination to that time. He became the chief executive officer of the combined Knight Ridder in 1976 and was named as the company's chairman in 1982.

Chapman stepped down as chairman of Knight Ridder on October 1, 1989, succeeded by James K. Batten. During Chapman's tenure at Knight Ridder, the chain's newspapers won a total of 33 Pulitzer Prizes and revenues increased threefold. The firm was able to get an operating agreement between Knight Ridder's Detroit Free Press and Gannett Company's The Detroit News approved by the United States Department of Justice.

=== Philanthropy and civic leadership ===
Chapman was active in philanthropic and civic efforts in Miami and throughout South Florida. He was involved in an effort to rebuild portions of Homestead, Florida and Southern Miami-Dade County that had been severely damaged during 1992's Hurricane Andrew and was part of a $2 billion Downtown Miami renewal project. He was the founder of Community Partnership for Homeless, an organization designed to help Miami's homeless get off the streets and return to self-sufficiency.

Chapman co-founded and co-headed the Non-Group, a civically influential group of Miami-Dade business elites.

Chapman had headed the Florida Philharmonic Orchestra, the Miami Coalition for a Drug-Free Community, Goodwill Industries of South Florida, the Greater Miami Chamber of Commerce, Miami Citizens Against Crime, the Orange Bowl Committee, a committee to build the Miami Performing Arts Center and the local United Way. In 1992 he was appointed by President Bush to be the first Chairman of Community Anti-Drug Coalitions of America.

With donations from Chapman and $14 million in contributions from Knight Ridder and associated foundations, Florida International University named the Alvah H. Chapman, Jr. Graduate School of Business in his honor in 2001. He also endowed the Alvah Chapman Chair in Management at The Citadel School of Business and his alma mater annually awards the Alvah Chapman Distinguished Leadership Award to deserving members of the business community.

Chapman died at age 87 on December 25, 2008, of pneumonia. He had Parkinson's disease and had experienced a number of strokes, in addition to breaking a hip in March 2008.
