= 2020 Popular Democratic Party of Puerto Rico primaries =

2020 Popular Democratic Party primaries
- August 9 and 16, 2020
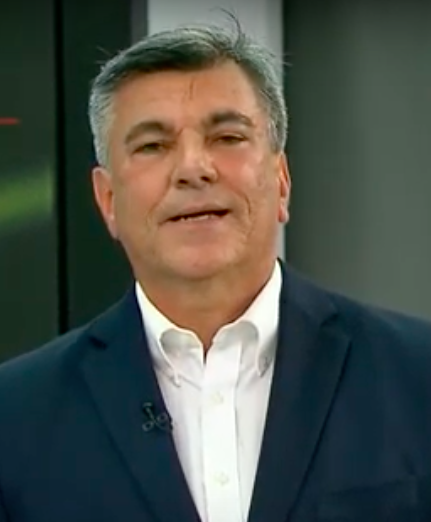

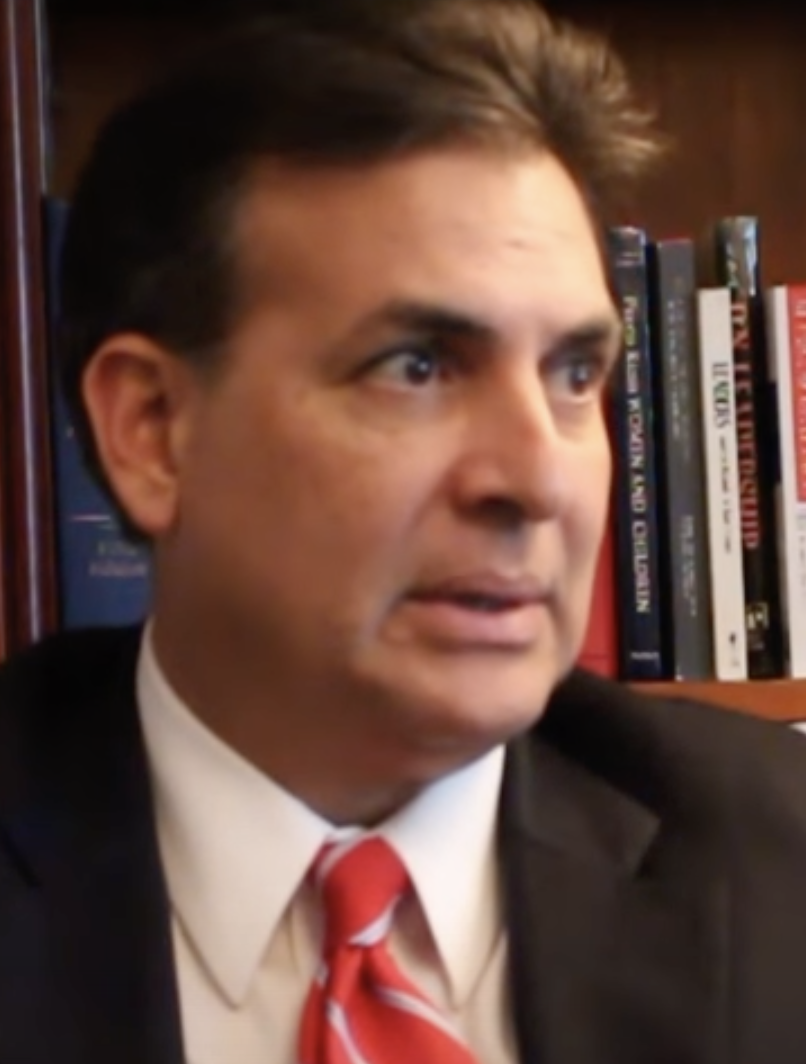

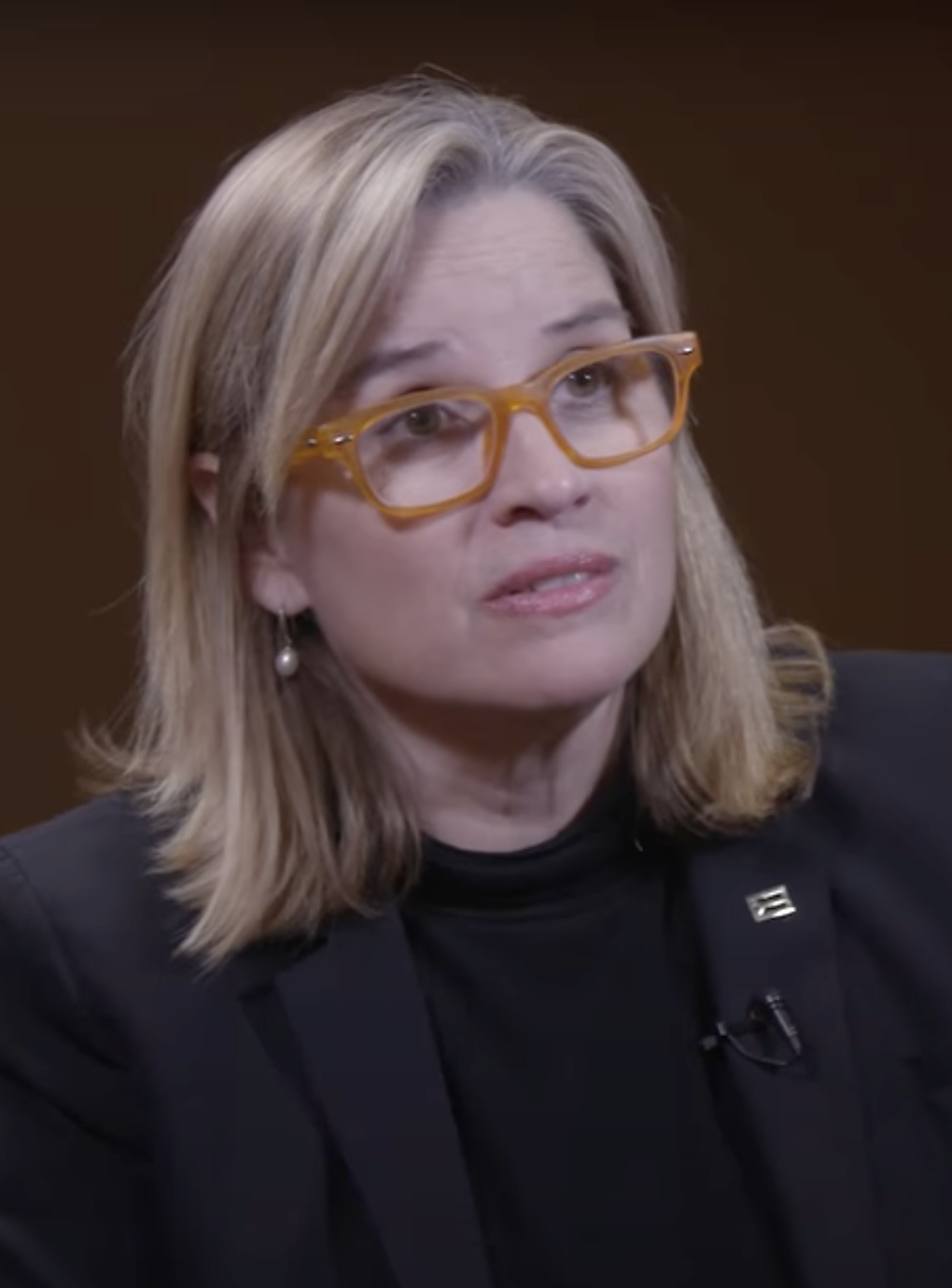
Nominee	Charlie Delgado	Eduardo Bhatia	Carmen Yulín Cruz
Party	Popular Democratic	Popular Democratic	Popular Democratic
Alliance	Independent	Democratic	Democratic
Popular vote	61,317	21,973	12,822
Percentage	63.80%	22.86%	13.34%
- Election results by county or municipality
Previous Popular Democratic Party nominee for Governor of Puerto Rico
David Bernier
2020 Popular Democratic Party nominee for Governor of Puerto Rico
Charlie Delgado

The 2020 Popular Democratic Party primaries was the primary elections by which voters of the Popular Democratic Party (PPD) chose its nominees for various political offices of Puerto Rico for 2020. The primaries, originally scheduled for June 2020, were delayed until August 9, 2020, due to the COVID-19 pandemic. The August 9 elections, however, were marred by a lack of ballots leading a suspension of the election; polling locations that could not open on August 9 were scheduled to be open for voting on August 16. The winner for the party's nomination for Governor of Puerto Rico is Charlie Delgado, mayor of Isabela, over Carmen Yulín Cruz, mayor of San Juan and Eduardo Bhatia, Minority Leader of the Puerto Rico Senate.

== Candidates ==
=== Governor ===
- Carlos Delgado Altieri, mayor of Isabela
- Eduardo Bhatia, Minority Leader of the Puerto Rico Senate
- Carmen Yulín Cruz, mayor of San Juan, and former member of the Puerto Rico House of Representatives

==== Withdrawn ====
- Roberto Prats, former member of the Senate of Puerto Rico
- Juan Zaragoza, former Secretary of Treasury of Puerto Rico

=== Resident Commissioner ===
- Aníbal Acevedo Vilá, former Resident Commissioner of Puerto Rico and former Governor of Puerto Rico

=== Senate ===
In the Senate of Puerto Rico, the PPD holds 3 at-large seats and 1 district seat. The PPD also holds 3 additional seats that are temporarily added under Article Three of the Constitution of Puerto Rico whenever the majority party (in this case the New Progressive Party) wins more than two thirds of the original 27 seats in contention.

=== House of Representatives ===
The PPD holds 15 seats in the House of Representatives of Puerto Rico.

== Opinion polls ==
=== Governor ===
Poll source	Date(s) administered	Sample size (Note: Key: A – all adults RV – registered voters LV – likely voters V – unclear)	Margin of error	Carlos Delgado Altieri	Eduardo Bhatia	Carmen Yulín Cruz	Other/Undecided
Radio Isla	July 28–August 3, 2020	≈246 (LV) (Note: 25% of a full sample of 983 likely voters)	–	39%	35%	21%	5% (Note: Undecided with 5%)
Becaon Research/Puerto Rico Herald	July 20–26, 2020	≈192 (V) (Note: 24% of a full sample of 802 voters)	–	44%	26%	16%	14% (Note: "Undecided/Refused" with 8%; "None of the above" with 6%)
Beacon Research/Puerto Rico Herald	May 3–7, 2020	~181 (LV) (Note: of a full sample of 802 voters)	–	25%	35%	17%	23% (Note: "None of the above" with 16%; "Undecided/Refused" with 7%)
Diario Las Américas	March 30-April 21, 2020	— (RV) (Note: PPD subsample of 1500 registered voter sample)	—	—	49%	25%	26% (Note: "Other" with 7%; Undecided with 19%)
Beacon Research/Puerto Rico Herald	March, 2020	– (V) (Note: Not yet released)	–	17%	52%	16%	15% (Note: "None of the above" with 7%; "Undecided/Refused" with 8%)
Beacon Research/Puerto Rico Herald	February, 2020	– (V)	–	21%	42%	12%	25% (Note: "None of the above" with 11%; "Undecided/Refused" with 14%)
El Nuevo Día	February 21–25, 2020	170 (RV)	± 7.5%	12%	50%	24%	14% (Note: "Other candidate" with 4%; "refused" with 1%; would not vote with 0%; undecided with 9%)

== Results ==
=== Governor ===
Popular Democratic Party primary results
Party	Candidate	Votes	%
Popular Democratic	Carlos Delgado Altieri	128,638	62.97%
Popular Democratic	Eduardo Bhatia	48,563	23.77%
Popular Democratic	Carmen Yulín Cruz	27,068	13.25%
Total votes		204,269	100.00%

== See also ==
- 2020 New Progressive Party of Puerto Rico primaries
