= James Batten =

American journalist and publisher

James Knox Batten (January 11, 1936 – June 24, 1995) was an American journalist and publisher. He was chief executive officer of Knight-Ridder publishing. A native of Suffolk, Virginia, he studied chemistry and biology at Davidson College and began working as a journalist for the Charlotte Observer in 1957. He joined Knight-Ridder's Washington, D.C. bureau in 1965 and covered the Civil Rights Movement. He became City Editor of the Detroit Free Press in 1971, then returning to Charlotte, N.C. in 1972 as Executive Editor. He moved to the company's corporate headquarters in Miami in 1975, becoming company president in 1982. Batten became chairman of Knight Ridder on October 1, 1989, succeeding Alvah Chapman, Jr.

Batten was a member of the Non-Group, a civically influential group of Miami-Dade business elites.

He was elected a Fellow of the American Academy of Arts and Sciences in 1994. The same year, he was diagnosed with a malignant brain tumor and survived one year. He died in Miami aged 59.

== See also ==
- List of notable brain tumor patients
