= Enoch Douglas Davis =

American reverend, author and civil rights activist

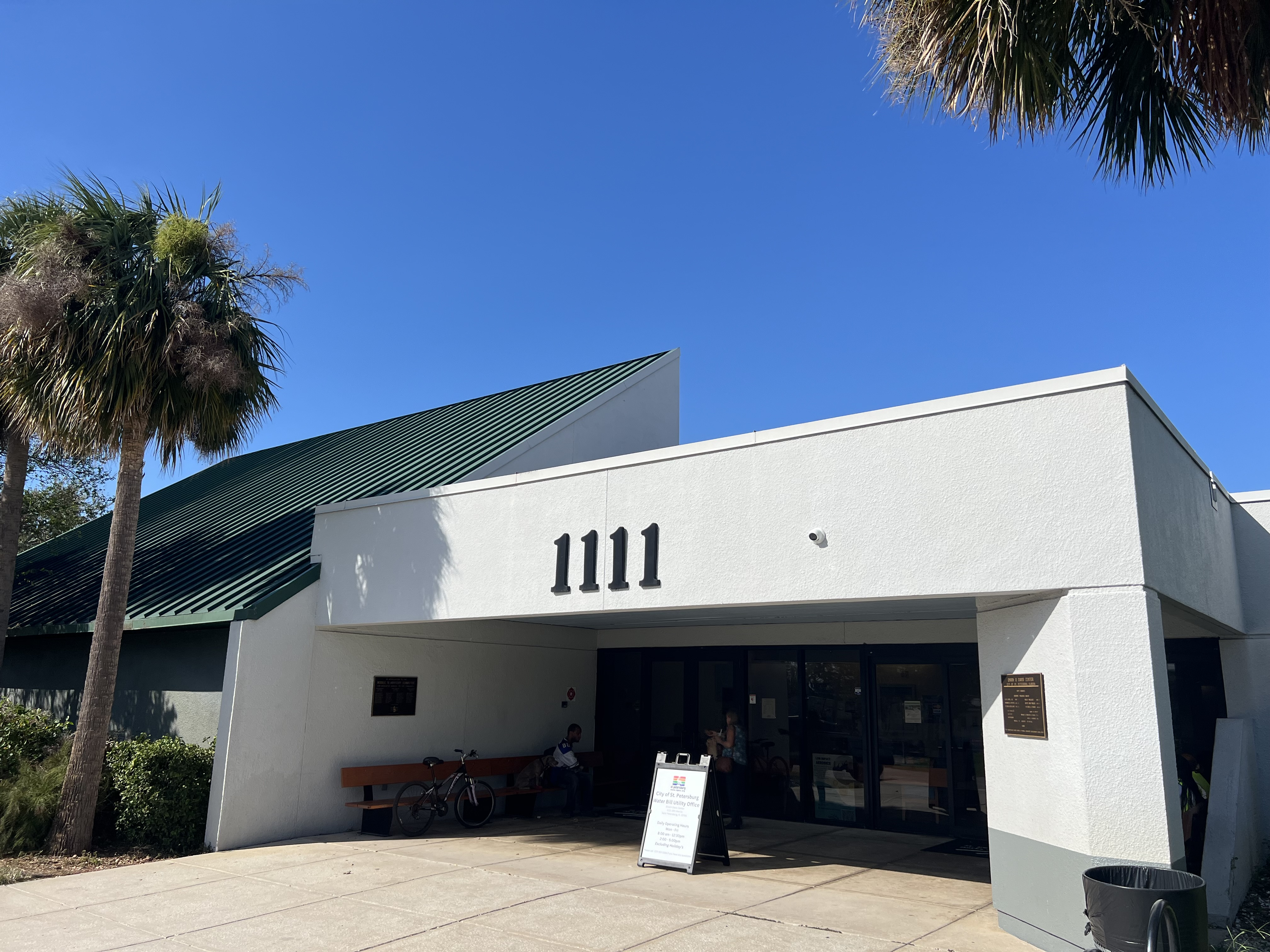
Enoch D. Davis Center in South St. Petersburg Florida, November 2024

Enoch Douglas Davis (1908—1985) was an American reverend, author and civil rights activist who spent the majority of his life in the town of St. Petersburg, Florida. A native from Burke County, Georgia, his family moved to St. Petersburg in 1925, and he began his religious career when he gave his first sermon in 1930 at Bethel Community Baptist Church, which was then known as Second Bethel; he was made the church's official pastor two years later. At the time of his retirement in 1984, he had served as reverend for Bethel Community for over 50 years, making him at the time the longest-serving pastor in the history of St. Petersburg. As an author, his works include Toward the Promised Land and his autobiography, On The Bethel Trail.

As a civil rights activist, his played an integral role in ending citywide segregation and empowering the black American community; it is largely due to his contributions that St. Petersburg was spared much of the race-related brutality that occurred in many cities in America's southern states in the 1950s and 1960s. He was also the first black president in the St. Petersburg Council of Churches and was presented with 11 awards and honors in his lifetime, including the National Conference of Christians and Jews’ Silver Medallion Brotherhood Award in 1980. The Enoch Davis Center is named after him and is located at 1111 18th Ave. South in St. Petersburg

== Early life ==
Enoch Davis was born in 1908 in Burke County, Georgia, to cotton farmers Abram and Mozell Davis. His family was large, with sixteen children including himself as the youngest, but he claimed to remember to only nine of his brothers and sisters, some of whom “died early;” one of them killed by lightning. The Davises raised their own livestock and grew their own vegetables, and as Christians valued hard work and regular prayer. Davis would often have other farmers in his neighborhood ask him to drop corn for them as he was quite skilled at it, and would be paid 10 cents for every boll weevil he caught and brought back alive.

Many of the family's neighbors and acquaintances, including sharecroppers and Davis's first teacher—who was also a preacher—carried weapons on them in case of attack, often by the white owners of their land. Davis's oldest brother, unwilling to take abuse from these white landowners, left home as a young man and traveled up north, never to return except to see their father Abram before his death; soon afterwards Davis's brother himself died and was buried in Brooklyn, New York. After Abram's death, Mozell moved the family to Waynesboro, within the Burke County lines, where they lived for three years before moving to St. Petersburg.

Their house was owned by a black physician, Dr. Wm. H. Bryan, for whom Davis worked in his office for over two years. His jobs included maintaining the office and delivering medicine before and after school, and sometimes accompanying him to make house calls in the rural areas late at night. Through Dr. Bryan he met Rev. Bob Phelps, a pastor for a handful of Presbyterian churches and the principal of Boggs Academy High School in Keysville, Georgia, which was considered the best black high school within a hundred-mile radius. Davis often attended services at the church with Dr. Bryan and Rev. Phelps and from them developed a fondness for high collars and long coats, although his mother would not let him wear long pants because he was not considered old enough to wear them. He went to high school at Waynesboro High and Industrial, which offered courses up to the eleventh grade. In Augusta at the time, there were no public schools for black students; students in that area attended Walker Baptist Institute, named after preacher Dr. Charles T. Walker and sponsored by the Walker Baptist Association.

== St. Petersburg and Community Baptist ==
In November 1925, Davis's family left Burke County and moved to St. Petersburg, Florida when he was a teenager to join his oldest sister and her family. His first job was with the Georgia Engineering Co., in which he paved the streets with Augusta blocks and earned $21 a week. It would not be his only job; he also unloaded ships at the docks at night, as well as spray citrus trees, write insurance claims and work in cafeterias. During the spring and summer after work he liked to play baseball, but always tried to make it to church every Sunday if it could be helped. As he would recall about his neighborhood in his memoir, “Those were great days…Things were different. We were not afraid of each other. We could leave doors of our houses unlocked and were seldom disappointed. Police officers had no reason to be afraid, although they were often brutal to blacks without provocation.”.

Bethel Community Baptist Church, then known as Second Bethel, was established in St. Petersburg in 1923 on 16th St. and 5th Ave. South. Before becoming the church's pastor he had several jobs within the church, as an usher, choir boy, clerk, Sunday school teacher and more. He gave his first sermon there at the age of 21 in May 1930; he would get his license to preach later that year in October. After the previous pastor resigned, he was approached by the deacons to apply to become the next pastor, which he initially refused because there were other applicants that he thought had more experience than him. He finally consented, according to him, when he found encouragement through a pamphlet that read, “I can do all things through Christ, who strengthens me.” He was ordained on December 8, 1931, and began his service as Second Bethel's fourth pastor in January 1932.

Bethel would be his only charge throughout his career as a reverend. Although he was handed offers from more affluent churches to work for them, Davis rejected each one; he submitted his resignation once in response to an offer but later recanted after a 30-day tabling period. “All I could hear from the Lord was, ‘I have given you the opportunity; you also have a congregation in St. Petersburg where you are loved and respected […]’...I chose to remain on the Bethel Trail because I wanted to see more changes at Bethel and in St. Petersburg.”

Davis married a schoolteacher, Hazel. They were together for 40 years, up until his death, and had one son, LeRoy Davis, and one daughter Elizabeth Davis (later, Elizabeth Ellis). He later became a grandfather to at least one girl.

Even after taking over as pastor, Davis still wanted to further his education. He traveled across Florida and back into Georgia to earn his degrees, and frequently found himself on the receiving end of discrimination at road stops or harassment on the highway by patrolmen because of his race. In the way of education, he earned his Associate in Arts degree from Florida Normal and Industrial Memorial College in St. Augustine (which he helped to found and whose board he served on), and then his Bachelor of Arts degree from Florida Agricultural and Mechanical College in Tallahassee, majoring in philosophy and religion. He also conducted theological studies at Garrett Biblical Institute in Evanston, Illinois, and in 1964, he earned his master's degree in Religious Education from the Interdenominational Theological Center in Atlanta, Georgia. He attended University of South Florida and earned a certificate to teach.

Giving and caring perhaps to a fault, Davis had a tendency to loan money to those who asked for it, even if it was not in his best interests to do so, sometimes going so far as to make arrangements to get money if he did not have it to give. He was asked by the deacons of his church to stop.

Under Davis, Second Bethel, which was eventually renamed Bethel Community Baptist Church, expanded in both its congregation—from 180 to over 700 members—and in space as an educational building was established in the late 1940s for blacks at the cost of $50,000. The church boosted voter registration and opened green benches for blacks, as well as opened a credit union in 1953, “to help its members help themselves.” Under him, Bethel Community adopted a “Policy on Open Membership” in 1962 that rejected “…all types of discrimination and segregation,” declaring its doors “open to all who would subscribe to its Articles of Faith…that church membership should never be [based on] one’s race.”

In 1951, Davis was elected as Moderator for the West Coast District Baptist Association in Florida and changed the terms of service for Moderators from lifelong to four-year rotations. He served as a Moderator for a total of 17 non-consecutive years and three years as the first Vice-Moderator. He was also affiliated with the Melrose Park branch of YMCA, the Council on Human Relations, the City Council's Minority Housing Committee, and the first School Board Committee on School Desegregation in Pinellas County. In 1956, he worked with the Citizens Cooperative Committee to integrate the city bus lines and end employment discrimination.

In January 1966, Davis was elected as the first black president for the St. Petersburg Council of Churches; he served for two terms. He once campaigned for the District 4 City Council post in 1969, but lost to incumbent Horace Williams, 20,462 votes to 14,466. His wife Hazel said, “His purpose was to help people. Not politics.”

Davis concerned himself with the issues of poverty and economic struggle as well as race relations and black equality, believing the issues to be intertwined. In August 1971, Bethel Community Heights, an 84-unit low-rent housing project for blacks and whites of low and middle income, was established on 15th St. South under Davis's leadership, a decision that he described as “a decision of serious proportions” and one that he made after he dreamed of standing over a hole and seeing a man with a wheelbarrow pour concrete into it before he jumped into it.

Rev. Davis admitted, “I had in mind to serve the Lord. But to become an activist, no.” Still, he has been repeatedly called “one of [St. Petersburg’s] foremost civil rights activists.” He remained a firm advocate for nonviolence in acquiring equal rights. With the help of Rev. Davis, this St. Pete church assisted the community both socially and spiritually as they fought against Black discrimination and stigma. The extent of St. Petersburg segregation should be further explained. Under the laws and regulations of the time, "every aspect of African American life in Tampa, St. Petersburg, Sarasota and their surrounding cities was segregated." Black students were forced to attend different schools than white students, and they were severely underfunded. In fact, "Blacks could only be cared for at “Black only” hospitals, and other public and private establishments like restaurants and beaches were often segregated – if blacks were allowed in at all." During this same time, St. Petersburg was gaining fame as the tourist location with the green benches. up to 7,000 green benches were in public areas of the city and offered a social location for people to congregate . In modern St. Petersburg, many establishments are named after this iconic bench. However, these benches were notoriously for whites only. The Police "kept black residents off the benches." These are the discriminations faced by the black community that Enoch Davis advocated against. In addition to ending bus and school segregation and employee discrimination, Davis worked to win voting rights for blacks, open the city's beaches and public pools to the black community, and he led his share of sit-ins at lunch counters and theaters. Particularly noteworthy are his involvements with the Freedom Riders and the local sanitation workers’ strikes. When the Freedom Riders came to Florida in the late 1950s to protest interstate segregation laws, Rev. Davis allowed them to stay in his home and to use the church as headquarters, and with the help of his brother, the police and several neighbors, he offered them protection from agitated segregationists. He earned several threats on his life for his civil rights work. On an interview in 1984, he said, “I didn’t think about the risks then. Just the right.”

He marched with the city's sanitation workers who went on strike for 116 days in 1968, demanding better wages. Sometimes the marches would be followed up by lootings and burnings by non-participants. Said Rev. Lacy R. Harwell about this trying time: “Rev. Davis expanded his ministry beyond his congregation and took the whole town for his parish.”

In 1979, Rev. Davis published his book, On The Bethel Trail. The book chronicles the story of Davis's ministry and his work in the civil rights movement, as well as presents his thoughts on religion and civil rights and makes mention of other influential black Americans.

Rev. Davis earned many awards and accolades for his services. In May 1968, the St. Petersburg Bar Association made him the first black recipient of the Liberty Bell Award, for his “efforts to maintain law and order.” In 1980 he was presented the National Conference of Christians and Jews’ Silver Medallion Brotherhood Award; upon receiving it he gave his thanks and pledged, “…we shall continue making installments on an unpayable debt.” In September 1981, the city honored Davis with the opening of the Enoch Davis Center, a multipurpose community center with a library and science center, a 250-seat auditorium and offices. This center has sense been a hub for community, culture and activism with a concentration on serving and advocating for St. Petersburg citizens . Davis called this “one of my greatest honors.” In between, he received citations from the YMCA as a Christian Service Leader, the N.W. Collier Award from Florida Memorial College, citation from the United Negro College Fund for “voluntary service,” and citation from the Ambassador Club Inc. for “distinguished service.” The church was also honored Davis greatly by adding an Educational Wing, new updated pews and an organ. His leadership at the church also sparked the building of an 84-unit housing project for low-income St. Petersburg residents. He remained humble throughout all of it; during one testimonial dinner, he reportedly admitted as he thanked the speakers that he “had difficulty figuring out who they were talking about so highly.”

== Later years ==
After 52 years of service, Rev. Davis retired in March 1984 at the age of 75, making him the longest-serving pastor in St. Petersburg's history at the time, and was succeeded by Rev. Gregory Wallace. However, he continued to attend church services and deliver sermons as well as maintain his volunteer work, because “blacks still have a long way to go.” “I would not like to see a repeat of the days of the Great Depression nor the days through which we passed in the 50s and 60s…Our greatest problem facing us today is Reaganomics. All classes have to be aware of it because when poor people suffer, everyone suffers—if not materially, in consciousness.”

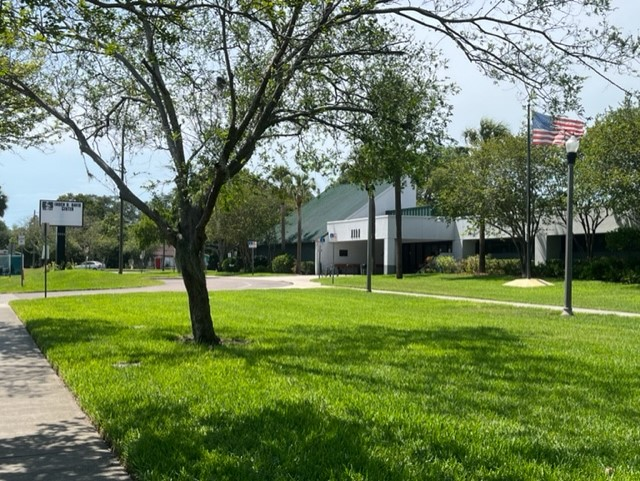
Enoch D. Davis Center in St. Petersburg, Florida

On September 29, 1985, Rev. Davis died at age 77 at Bayfront Medical Center after a long battle with pancreatic cancer. His funeral service, open to the public, was held at Bethel Community Baptist Church on October 5, 1985, with a dozen speakers addressing a crowd of 560 mourners. The day before, a stream of nearly 840 people came to view the body and pay their last respects, an event that reportedly lasted all day and into the night.

One member of his congregation said, “He was like Martin Luther King…a very peaceful man.”

At the service, mourners were told that Rev. Davis's work “is not complete.” Davis himself had these sentiments at the end of Bethel Trail six years earlier when he said:

“…the South, as does the country, has a long way to go. In all realistic terms, the accomplishments of civil rights leaders like Martin Luther King Jr. and the legislation passed…and the softening of the hearts and minds of many whites have all contributed to the cause of human equality and brotherhood.”

== Bibliography ==
Adams, Calvin. “Church Membership Up; Many Improvements Made.” St. Petersburg Times (St. Petersburg, FL), Jan. 27, 1952.

Basse, Craig (ed). “Civil rights leader Enoch Douglas Davis dies at age 77.” St. Petersburg Times (St. Petersburg, FL), Sept. 30, 1985.

Davis, Enoch Douglas. On the Bethel Trail. St. Petersburg: Valkyrie Press, Inc., 1979.

Ellis, Virginia. “Civil Disobedience Idea Rapped As Spark Igniting Urban Riots.” St. Petersburg Times (St. Petersburg, FL), May 2, 1968.

Hartzell, Scott Taylor. “Reverend made lasting impression on city.” St. Petersburg Times, Sept. 8, 1999. .

Evening Independent staff. “Bar Association Cites Rev. Davis.” Evening Independent (St. Petersburg, FL), May 1, 1968.

---. “Rev. Davis To Run For Council.” Evening Independent (St. Petersburg, FL), Jan. 10, 1969.

Mayer, Cynthia. “Friends gather to mourn Rev. Davis and remember his accomplishments.” St. Petersburg Times (St. Petersburg, FL), Oct. 5, 1985.

---. “Keep up Rev. Davis’ work, mourners told.” St. Petersburg Times (St. Petersburg, FL), Oct. 6, 1985.

Mullane, Sheila. “Future Of St. Petersburg Is Up to Voters Tuesday.” Evening Independent (St. Petersburg, FL), Mar. 1, 1969.

Peterman, Peggy. “Rev. Enoch Davis honored at dinner.” St. Petersburg Times (St. Petersburg, FL), Feb. 2, 1980.

Richardson, Michael (ed.). “A pair of Pinellas County giants are moving on.” Evening Independent (St. Petersburg, FL), Mar. 31, 1984.

Ryan, James. “Spicer Wins; 2 Councilmen Ousted.” St. Petersburg Times (St. Petersburg, FL), Mar. 19, 1969.

St. Petersburg Times staff. “The Rev. Mr. Davis heads church group.” St. Petersburg Times (St. Petersburg, FL), Jan. 26, 1966.

---. “Civil rights leader admitted to hospital.” St. Petersburg Times (St. Petersburg, FL), Jun. 21, 1983.

Stiff, Robert M.; Richardson, Michael; Rawlins, Thomas (eds.) “On the anniversary of Rev. Enoch Davis.” Evening Independent (St. Petersburg, FL), Jan. 4, 1982.

Weldon, Ann. “Rev. Davis’ Ministry Nears 41st Year.” Evening Independent (St. Petersburg, FL), Jan. 22, 1972.

Williams, Vanessa. “Veteran pastor praised at 50th anniversary service.” St. Petersburg Times (St. Petersburg, FL), Jan. 4, 1982.
