= Radio Isla =

Pichilemu; Chile
- Broadcast area: Cardenal Caro province
- Frequency: 95.9 FM
- Branding: FM

Programming
- Language: Spanish

Ownership
- Owner: Sociedad Comercial e Inversiones Fivalen Ltda.

History
- First air date: 2006

Links
- Website: http://www.islafm.cl

Radio Isla is a radio station located in Pichilemu. It is owned by Sociedad Comercial e Inversiones Fivalen Ltda. and directed by Fidel Valenzuela González.
