= Diario Las Américas =

Spanish-language newspaper founded in South Florida

Diario las Américas

- Digital front page of the 30 September 2014 publishing.
- Owner: Nelson J. Mezerhane G.
- Founder(s): Horacio Aguirre and Francisco Aguirre
- Publisher: Américas Multimedia Group
- Editor: Iliana Lavastida
- Founded: July 4, 1953
- Language: Spanish
- Headquarters: 2150 Coral Way, 1st floor, Miami, FL 33145; United States
- City: Miami, Florida
- Country: United States
- Circulation: 45,000+ weekly
- ISSN: 0744-3234
- OCLC number: 1774712
- Website: www.diariolasamericas.com

Diario las Américas is the first Spanish-language newspaper founded in South Florida, the second oldest in the United States dedicated to Spanish-speaking readers, after La Opinión, in Los Angeles. Its first copy circulated on July 4, 1953, under the direction of its founders, the brothers of Nicaraguan origin, Francisco and Horacio Aguirre Baca. Diario Las Américas has been a member of the Inter-American Press Association (IAPA) since its foundation.

== History ==
Diario las Américas was founded on July 4, 1953. It began as an evening newspaper with circulation from Tuesday to Sunday. Its closing time was noon because the copies were sent by air to different cities in the United States and Latin America where it was distributed to subscribers, government offices and diplomatic headquarters, in the early hours of the morning of the following day. In June 2006, its website was launched on the Internet, for which it partnered with "Hispanic Digital Network" who was in charge of designing and activating it. At the end of 2012, the newspaper was acquired by the Mezerhane Group, whose president is the businessman of Venezuelan origin, Nelson J. Mezerhane G. After the start of this new stage, the Spanish journalist Manuel Aguilera, assumed the editorial direction. Under the management of the Mezerhane group, during the first year of this new stage, Diario Las Américas underwent a graphic redesign, the first of a total image restructuring that led to the current format, tabloid 1115 that contains 32, 40 to 48 pages, all in color.

Since May 2013, its publishing deadline changed, it became a morning edition, with publication seven days a week. At this stage, new reporters and a network of collaborators in Latin America and Europe joined the newsroom. On July 1, 2015, the journalist of Cuban origin Osmín Martínez assumed the direction of the newspaper in front of which he remained until October 2019. As the media began to expand its operations to digital platforms, Diario Las Américas adjusted the frequency of circulation of its printed copies. First, it had printed editions three times a week, Monday, Wednesday, and Friday. Since 2018, as part of the strategic changes adopted, Diario Las Américas began to circulate every Saturday in a weekly format. Currently, the weekly print edition circulates every Friday at all Miami-Dade and South Broward County outlets. In November 2019, the journalist of Cuban origin Iliana Lavastida was appointed executive director of Diario Las Américas.

== Management ==
The management team of Diario Las Américas is made up of Mashud Mezerhane and Jorge Daall, vice presidents of operations; Aquiles Presilla, director of operations; Alberto Vethencourth, director of finance; Ana Bringas, director of advertising; Isadora Gaviria, marketing director and Camilo Aguiar, distribution manager of digital content.

== Columnists and contributors ==
Diario Las Américas counts among its contributors as columnists Asdrúbal Aguiar, Jaime Bayly, Edgar C. Otálvora, Remedios Díaz Oliver, Carlos Sánchez Berzain, Oscar Elías Biscet, Orlando Gutiérrez Boronat, Orlando Viera Blanco, Ibéyise Pacheco, and Rolando Montoya, among others.

== Distribution ==
It circulates every Friday with a weekly print edition. It also maintains a website and social networks. Its readers are Hispanic, mostly of Cuban, Nicaraguan, Venezuelan, and Colombian origin. Diario Las Américas maintains subscribers in other regions of Florida and the US.

== Sections ==
·El Tema de la Semana (Topic of the Week)
·Florida (Florida)
·América Latina (Latin America)
·Cuba (Cuba)
·Venezuela (Venezuela)
·Voces de Venezuela (Venezuelan Voices)
·EEUU (USA)
·Mundo (World)
·Dinero (Money)
·Salud (Health)
·Turismo (Tourism)
·Estilo y Sociedad (Lifestyle and Society)
·Vida y Artes (Arts and Style)
·Deportes (Sports)
·Tribuna Abierta (Open Forum)
·Classificados (Classifieds)

== Digital spaces ==
·Noticiero en 90 segundos (90 Seconds Newscast)
·En consulta con el Doctor Misael (Consultation with Dr. Misael)
·La buena noticia (The Good News)
·Cartelera cultural semanal (Weekly Cultural Bulletin Board)
·Crónicas de Facundo (Facundo Chronicles)
·Revelando Cuba (Revealing Cuba)
·Hablemos de Inmigración (Let's Talk About Immigration)
·Espacio de entrevistas Un Café con Camila (Talk Show “Coffee with Camila”)
·Espacio de entrevistas Juan al Medio (Talk Show “Juan's Forefront)
·Noticiero Resumen Semanal (Weekly News Review)
·Cápsula informativa semanal (Weekly news brief)

== Headquarters ==
Its headquarters are located in the financial district of Miami, at 2150 Coral Way, 1st floor, Miami, FL 33145, United States.
