= Puerto Rico Department of Justice =

Government of Puerto Rico

Department of Justice of Puerto Rico
- Departamento de Justicia de Puerto Rico

Agency overview
- Formed: July 25, 1952; 74 years ago
- Jurisdiction: Executive Branch
- Headquarters: San Juan, Puerto Rico
- Agency executive: Lourdes Gómez Torres, Secretary of Justice
- Child agency: Special Investigations Bureau
- Key document: Article IV of the Constitution of Puerto Rico
- Website: www.justicia.gobierno.pr

The Puerto Rico Department of Justice (PR DOJ) (Spanish: Departamento de Justicia de Puerto Rico) is the Executive Department of the Commonwealth of Puerto Rico responsible for the enforcement of the local law in the commonwealth and the administration of justice. The Department is equivalent to the State Bureau of Investigation in many US states. The Department is headed by the Secretary of Justice of Puerto Rico and has been in existence in one form or another since Puerto Rico was a Spanish colony. The current agency was created by the Constitution of Puerto Rico in 1952.

The Department, headquartered in a multi-story building in the Miramar sector of San Juan, includes a structure of District Attorneys to handle criminal caseload, as well as specialized divisions to handle antitrust cases, general civil cases, public integrity (corruption) and federal litigation, among others.

== Agencies ==
- Special Investigations Bureau

== Secretary of Justice ==
The Department's head, the Attorney General, is appointed by the Governor of Puerto Rico, and serves at his pleasure, after receiving the consent of the Senate of Puerto Rico. Puerto Rico's Solicitor General, which handles appellate work, is also appointed by the governor and subject to the advice and consent of the Senate. Formers secretaries include:

- 1908–1910: Henry W. Hoyt
- 1910–1912: Foster H. Brown
- 1912–1914: Walcott H. Pitkin
- 1914–1919: Howard L. Kern
- 1919–1923: Salvador Mestre
- 1923–1925: Herbert P. Coats
- 1925–1928: George C. Butte
- 1968-1969: Jose C. Aponte García
- 1969-1970: Santiago C. Soler Favalle
- 1970-1971: Blas C. Herrero
- 1972-1972: Wallace González Oliver
- 1973 interim: Rafael Santos Del Valle
- 1972-1975: Francisco de Jesús Schuck
- 1975-1976: Carlos R. Ríos Gautier
- 1984–1991: Héctor Rivera Cruz
- 1991–1992: Jorge E. Pérez-Díaz
- 1993–1996: Pedro Pierluisi
- 1996-2000: Jose Fuentes Agostini
- 2001– July 2004: Anabelle Rodriguez
- Aug.–Dec. 2004: William Vazquez Irizarry
- 2005–2008: Roberto Sánchez Ramos
- 2009–2010: Antonio Sagardía
- 2010–2012: Guillermo Somoza
- 2013–2013: Luis Sánchez Betances
- 2014–2017: César Miranda
- 2017-2019: Wanda Vázquez Garced
- 2019-2021: Dennise Longo Quiñones
- 2021-2024: Domingo Emanuelli
- Jan.-May. 2025: Janet Parra Mercado
- 2025-present: Lourdes Gómez Torres

== See also ==
- Crime in Puerto Rico
- Murder of Lorenzo González Cacho
