= Rafael Rodríguez Mercado =

Puerto Rican endovascular neurosurgeon

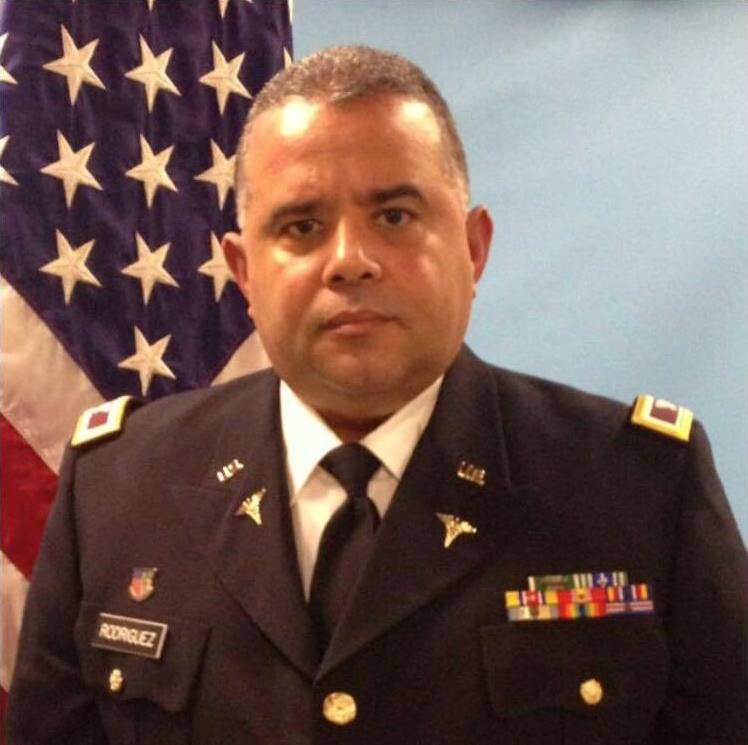

Secretary of Health of Puerto Rico
- In office January 2, 2017 – March 13, 2020
- Governor: Ricardo Rosselló; Wanda Vázquez Garced
- Preceded by: Ana Ríus Armendáriz
- Succeeded by: Concepción Quiñones de Longo (interim); Lorenzo González Feliciano

Personal details
- Born: 1961 (age 64–65) Ponce, Puerto Rico
- Children: 1
- Education: University of Puerto Rico (B.S.); University of Puerto Rico School of Medicine (M.D.); State University of New York at Buffalo; Colegio San Conrado
- Occupation: Neurosurgeon
- Profession: Physician

Military service
- Allegiance: United States of America
- Branch/service: United States Army Reserve
- Years of service: 1989-2023
- Rank: Colonel
- Unit: Command Surgeon 1st Mission Support Command

Rafael Rodríguez Mercado is a Puerto Rican neurosurgeon and military officer. He was the Secretary of Health of Puerto Rico from 2017 until his resignation in 2020. Rodríguez Mercado previously served as chancellor of the University of Puerto Rico, Medical Sciences Campus.

== Early life and education ==
Rodríguez Mercado was born in Ponce, Puerto Rico. He graduated from High School at Colegio San Conrado. Rodríguez Mercado earned a Bachelor of Science degree in chemistry from the Rio Piedras Campus of the University of Puerto Rico, and a Doctor of Medicine from the University of Puerto Rico School of Medicine, and completing a Residency in Neurological Surgery. He completed studies in Endovascular Neurosurgery at the State University of New York at Buffalo.

== Academic career ==
Rodríguez Mercado was the first to practice Endovascular Neurosurgery in Puerto Rico since 1997. Currently (2018) he is Professor of Neurosurgery at the University of Puerto Rico School of Medicine and director of the Endovascular Neurosurgery Program of that institution. He also leads the same program at ASEM Stroke Medical Center and, since 2001, is the director of the Fellows Training Program in Neuroendovascular Surgery at the University of Puerto Rico School of Medicine. There, he has trained physicians from many countries in this specialty as well had lecture conferences in many countries and published papers in peer review journals.

Rodríguez Mercado is a member of 15 international medical societies and has participated in several scientific research projects. Currently (2018) he is licensed to practice medicine in New York, Texas, Florida, Pennsylvania, and Puerto Rico.

In 2010, after a year as Interim Chancellor at the University of Puerto Rico, Medical Sciences Campus, he was named Chancellor of the Medical Sciences Campus of The University of Puerto Rico. In January 2017, Ricardo Rosselló, Governor of Puerto Rico, appointed Rodríguez Mercado as Secretary of Health of Puerto Rico. In September 2017, he was appointed as associate professor of Surgery initially and them promoted in February 2019 to adjunct professor of surgery at the Uniformed Services University of Health Sciences. In April 2019, was appointed Professor of Surgery at Ponce Health Sciences University as part of his academic and military career.

Rodríguez Mercado is a Fellow of the American College of Surgeons and a Diplomate of the American Board of Neurological Surgeons.

== Military career ==
Rodríguez Mercado began his military career in 1989. He served in the United States Army Reserve, Medical Corps, as Command Surgeon in the 1st Mission Support Command at Fort Buchanan, Puerto Rico. He served in Puerto Rico National Guard as Assistant Surgeon and Field Surgeon at Camp Santiago. He was from 2000 to 2006 also a staff neurosurgeon at Walter Reed Army Medical Center and Brooke Army Medical Center. He was Commander of the 369th Army Reserve Hospital Surgical Unit. Currently (2017), he was associate professor of Surgery and promoted in February 2019 to adjunct professor of surgery at the Uniformed Services University of the Health Sciences at Bethesda, Maryland on an IMA position. In 2022 he received the Legion of Merit medal. He retired from the Army Reserve in July 2023.

=== Military decorations ===

1	Legion of Merit		
2	Meritorious Service Medal with one bronze oak leaf clusters	Army Commendation Medal with four bronze oak leaf clusters	Army Achievement Medal with two silver oak leaf cluster
3	Army Reserve Components Achievement Medal	National Defense Service Medal with one bronze service stars	Global War on Terrorism Service Medal
4	Armed Forces Reserve Medal with bronze Hourglass Device	Army Service Ribbon	Army Reserve Components Overseas Training Ribbon with award numeral 2

== Secretary of Health of Puerto Rico ==
On 12 January 2017, he was appointed as 22nd Secretary of Health of Puerto Rico by Governor Ricardo Rosselló. His tenure as Health Secretary was marred with criticism over the Health Department's handling of mayor emergencies which affected Puerto Rico such as Hurricane Irma, Hurricane Maria, the 2020 earthquakes and the agency's botched handling of the COVID-19 outbreak as well as questionable Health Department contracts given to people associated with the governor's political campaign.

=== COVID-19 Outbreak Response ===
As COVID-19 cases were increasing in other states and countries, Rodríguez Mercado seemingly downplayed the urgency of the situation stating that the probability of a COVID-19 outbreak in Puerto Rico was unlikely. As suspected COVID-19 cases on the island grew, the agency resisted performing tests and sending them to the Centers for Disease Control and Prevention by setting a high bar on whom the tests should be performed. In one particular instance, an island doctor managed to convince the agency to test a patient only after pleading with CBS reporter David Begnaud @DavidBegnaud (March 8, 2020). "Puerto Rican Doctor says department of health refuses to test patient which doctor believes has signs of coronavirus" (Tweet) – via Twitter., after the Health agency denied requests to test his patient.

=== Resignation ===
On March 13, 2020, under public pressure and at the behest of governor Wanda Vázquez Garced, he immediately resigned to the position of Secretary of Health. His resignation came after the confirmation of several cases of COVID-19 on the island which included the case the agency had initially resisted on testing, as well as findings that the test samples were sent later than had been publicly announced, and that there had been documentation errors that caused subsequent delays in reporting. He was succeeded by interim secretary Concepción Quiñones de Longo.

== Personal life ==
Rodríguez Mercado is married to medical technologist, Wanda Santiago Pimentel. He has one son.
