= Albert Grajales =

American INTERPOL Director of Puerto Rico (born 1962)

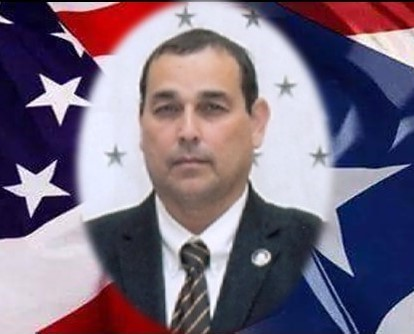
- Born: December 9, 1962 (age 63); Brooklyn, New York, United States
- Education: American Military University and Inter American University of Puerto Rico
- Occupations: Former Director of INTERPOL in Puerto Rico and the Coordinator of Intelligence / Antiterrorism (CIA). Currently he is a private intelligence consultant and media speaker. Expertise on national security: intelligence / counterintelligence / espionage / counter-espionage and public safety
- Years active: 1988 – 1999 and 2009 – 2013
- Employer: Intelligence Consultant
- Known for: Inductee instructor of the year by the World Wide Martials Arts Hall of Fame (1999)
- Spouse: Beatrice Fuentes de Grajales

Albert Grajales was the director of the Puerto Rico INTERPOL office. and Coordinator of Intelligence and Antiterrorism (CIA).

== Early years ==
Grajales was born in Brooklyn, New York, in December 9 of 1962, and at the age of six his family and him moved to Aguadilla, Puerto Rico. Albert was a Sergeant Major at the US Jr. Army of the American Crusaders Cadets. In high school he was for three years the president of Distributive Education Clubs of America – DECA (organization) where he won the national DECA male leader of Puerto Rico. He was an advocate for the Muscular Dystrophy Association (MDA) and the youth republican party of Puerto Rico.

He also model and sang professionally.

== Law enforcement and Intelligence career ==
In 1988, Albert Grajales joined the Puerto Rico Department of Justice (DOJPR) government of Puerto Rico as an agent of the Special Investigations Bureau (SIB) / INTERPOL office.

In 1993 he was assigned as chief of security and intelligence advisor to the secretary of justice, Hon. Pedro Pierluisi; and in 1997, Albert served as the auxiliary director of SIB in charge of the DOJPR security division and Intelligence advisor under secretary of justice Hon. José Fuentes Agostini.

Grajales returned in 2009 from a government break to serve under the secretary of justice Hon. Antonio Sagardía and former Governor Hon. Luis Fortuño as an aid for public safety and national security. Later on he continued to serve as the Special Assistant of public safety and national security to secretary of justice of Puerto Rico Guillermo Somoza Colombani.

In addition to his duties, Grajales was the INTERPOL director of the commonwealth government of Puerto Rico. During his tenured Mr. Grajales has created the position of Coordinator of Intelligence and Anti-terrorism (CIA). He continued to represent former Governor Hon. Luis Fortuño in the US intelligence committee on national security matters. He was in charge of all investigative operations of intelligence and counter intelligence concerning the criminal act on terrorism in Puerto Rico. Albert also worked in conjunction with the FBI National Security Branch on counterterrorism & with DEA's counternarcotics / narcoterrorism with the SAC, Javier Peña.

ADDITIONAL HIGHLIGHTS

Albert Grajales was the representative for the Attorney General and the Auxiliary Director of el Negociado de Investigaciones Especiales (NIE) (Special Investigations Bureau) for:

- Executive Board Member of HIDTA (High Intensive Drug Trafficking Area) in PR and USVI
- HIDTA Intelligence Subcommittee Executive member for PR and USVI
- Executive Board Member of PR State Homeland Security Fusion Center)
- Member of FBI's JTTF (Joint Terrorism Task Force) of the FBI
- INTERPOL point of contact for Puerto Rico for the Amazon counterterrorism program (Fusion Task Force on Terrorism)
- The Governor of Puerto Rico representative for the Memorial Institute for Prevention of Terrorism MIPT
- Puerto Rico government liaison for the Central Intelligence Agency (CIA)

== Career highlight: special representation and assignments ==
- Mr. Grajales was the special representative for Hon. Luis G. Fortuño, Governor of Commonwealth of Puerto Rico on Intelligence and Counter Terrorism matters for the US States Intelligence Community Agencies.
- Agent attached to The United States Secret Service branch office of PR for three years. Based on Linked In.
- INTERPOL Chairman of the Fusion Terrorism Task Force summit meeting on Counter Terrorism the Amazon Project, Sponsored by the General Secretary of INTERPOL held 2009 in Puerto Rico
- Coordinator of Intelligence / Antiterrorism State official (DOJ/Governor) in charge of the Central American and Caribbean Olympic Games of 2010, Puerto Rico
- Coordinator of Intelligence / Antiterrorism State official (DOJ/Governor) in charge of the visit of US President Hon. Barack Obama, 2011 in P.R.

== Intelligence consulting ==
Currently Albert Grajales is the CEO of Equinox Phoenix Intelligence Consulting (EPIC).

Active member and Puerto Rico Chapter represententative of the Association of Former Intelligence Officers (AFIO).

Albert is a volunteer advocate for the Central Intelligence Agency.

== A Sigung in the Martial Arts and a Hall of Fame Inductee ==
A certified senior instructor of Bruce Lee's Jeet Kune Do under his instructor and mentor, Sifu Ted Wong.

Martial arts instructor for law enforcement and national security special personnel.

A member of the World Wide Latin Martials Arts Hall of Fame (1999)

== Accolades ==
Al was a speaker at the 2012 Raleigh Spy Conference.

He hosts and produces his radio podcast program called Contra-Inteligencia in Puerto Rico.

Albert is an OP Columnist for El Nuevo Dia de Puerto Rico topics on national security, public safety and history.

== See also ==
- List of Puerto Ricans
