= Lorenzo González Feliciano =

Puerto Rican psychiatrist

Secretary of Health of Puerto Rico
- In office March 26, 2020 – January 2, 2021
- Governor: Wanda Vázquez Garced
- Preceded by: Rafael Rodríguez Mercado; Concepción Quiñones de Longo (interim)
- Succeeded by: Carlos Mellado López

Secretary of Health of Puerto Rico
- In office 2009–2013
- Governor: Luis Fortuño
- Preceded by: Iván González Cancel
- Succeeded by: Francisco Joglar Pesquera

Personal details
- Born: 1962 (age 63–64) Bronx, New York
- Education: University of Puerto Rico School of Medicine (M.D.); Central Michigan University (DHA); University of Pittsburgh (MBA)
- Occupation: Psychiatrist, government official
- Medical career
- Field: Psychiatry
- Institutions: Joint Commission; Physician Correctional

Lorenzo González Feliciano is a Puerto Rican psychiatrist. He previously served as Secretary of Health of Puerto Ricofrom March 28, 2020 to January, 2021 He previously also served as Secretary of Health under Governor Luis Fortuño.

== Education ==
González Feliciano completed a doctor of medicine from University of Puerto Rico School of Medicine. He earned a doctorate in health systems administration (DHA) from Central Michigan University and a master of business administration from the Joseph M. Katz Graduate School of Business at the University of Pittsburgh. He specialized in child and adolescent psychiatry at Columbia University.

== Career ==
González Feliciano worked as a psychiatrist in several states. He previously served as the Secretary of Health under Governor Luis Fortuño.

He worked for 15 years for the Joint Commission.

Until March 2020, he was the medical director of the corporation, Physician Correctional, which provided physical and mental health services to inmates.

González Feliciano was designated as the Secretary of Health of Puerto Rico on March 26, 2020. He was confirmed to the Senate of Puerto Rico on March 28. He succeeds Rafael Rodríguez Mercado and interim secretary Concepción Quiñones de Longo. His appointment was lauded by the president of the senate, Thomas Rivera Schatz. González Feliciano was endorsed by senators in the New Progressive Party and the Popular Democratic Party. Juan Dalmau opposed González Feliciano's nomination.

=== COVID-19 ===
González Feliciano is working with the Puerto Rican Task Force on combating the COVID-19 pandemic in Puerto Rico. He announced on March 28 that the two laboratories handling tests for COVID-19 would work 24 hours a day to process up to 300 tests. He will expand the capacity at Bayamón hospital form 100 to 150 hospital beds.
