= Inés Del C. Carrau Martínez =

Puerto Rican politician and attorney

Inés Carrau Martínez

Secretary of Justice of Puerto Rico
- Acting
- In office July 7, 2020 – January 2, 2021
- Governor: Wanda Vázquez Garced
- Preceded by: Wandymar Burgos Vargas
- Succeeded by: Domingo Emanuelli

Personal details
- Education: University of Puerto Rico, Mayagüez (BA); Pontifical Catholic University of Puerto Rico School of Law (JD, LLM)

Inés Del Carmen Carrau Martínez is an American politician and attorney who served as the Secretary of Justice of Puerto Rico from 2020 to 2021. She was the district attorney of Guayama, Puerto Rico.

== Early life and education ==
Carrau graduated from the University of Puerto Rico at Mayagüez with a bachelor's degree in natural sciences, from the Pontifical Catholic University of Puerto Rico School of Law with a Juris Doctor, and from Pontificia Universidad Católica with a Master of Laws degree.

== Career ==
At Pontifical Catholic University, Carrau worked as an assistant professor and was associate dean of the school of law.

Carrau became an inspector general and assistant prosecutor at the Puerto Rico Department of Justice in 1998. She was a special assistant to Secretary of Justice Antonio Sagardía in 2009. In 2019, she was placed in charge of the investigation into sexual harassment allegations against José Izquierdo Rodríguez, the former director of the Puerto Rico Tourism Company.

Carrau worked at the attorney general's office in Carolina until 2009, when she became interim district attorney in Guayama. Governor Luis Fortuño appointed her as district attorney of Guayama in 2010. Carrau worked in the public prosecutor's office in Carolina from 2010 to 2013, and was head of the prosecutor's office in Aibonito from 2013 to 2017.

Wandymar Burgos Vargas served as Secretary of Justice of Puerto Rico from July 3 to 6, 2020, before resigning. Carrau was the undersecretary under Burgos. Governor Wanda Vázquez Garced appointed Carrau as interim Secretary of Justice of Puerto Rico in 2020.

== Works cited ==
=== News ===
- "Nueva Secretaria de Justicia defiende a fiscales y asegura que es solamente interina". NotiCel. July 7, 2020. Archived from the original on May 31, 2026.
- Bauzá, Nydia (December 10, 2013). "Antonio Sagardía enfrenta la vista preliminar". Primera Hora. Archived from the original on May 31, 2026.

=== Web ===
- "Inés Carrau Martínez Puerto Rico Attorney General". National Association of Attorneys General. Archived from the original on November 30, 2020.

Legal offices
Preceded by Dennise Longo Quiñones	Secretary of Justice of Puerto Rico; Acting; 2020–2021	Succeeded by Domingo Emanuelli
