= Suranganie Dharmawardhane =

Sri Lankan biochemist

- Education: University of Colombo (B.S.); Northeastern University (M.S.); University of Massachusetts Amherst (Ph.D.)
- Scientific career
- Fields: Molecular biology, biochemistry, breast cancer metastasis
- Workplaces: University of Texas at Austin; University of Puerto Rico School of Medicine
- Thesis: Light-stimulated transplasmalemma electron transport in oat mesophyll cells (1988)

Suranganie Dharmawardhane Flanagan is a Sri Lankan molecular biologist and biochemist. She is a professor of biochemistry at the University of Puerto Rico School of Medicine.

== Education ==
In 1980, Dharmawardhane completed a B.S. at University of Colombo. She earned a M.S. at Northeastern University in 1984. She completed a Ph.D. at University of Massachusetts Amherst in 1987. Her dissertation was titled Light-stimulated transplasmalemma electron transport in oat mesophyll cells. She conducted postdoctoral training at Albert Einstein College of Medicine under John Condeelis.

== Career ==
Dharmawardhane researched fibroblasts and leukocytes in the laboratory of Richard Firtel at University of California, San Diego. From 1993 to 1997, Dharmawardhane was a senior research associate in the laboratory of Gary Bokoch in the department of immunology at Scripps Research. She was an assistant professor of molecular, cell, and developmental biology at the University of Texas at Austin (UT Austin) from 1998 to 2005. At UT Austin, Dharmawardhane collaborated with biomedical engineers to develop and design both whole body and microscopic fluorescence image analysis of breast cancer cells in mice. She was an associate professor first in the department of anatomy and cell biology (2005 to 2009) and later in the department of biochemistry (2009 to 2015) at University of Puerto Rico, Medical Sciences Campus (UPR-RCM). In 2015, Dharmawardhane became a tenured full professor and the graduate student coordinator in the department of biochemistry at UPR-RCM. She was an adjunct associate professor in the department of anatomy and cell biology at Universidad Central del Caribe.

Dharmawardhane transferred much of her research program in fluorescence imaging and breast cancer metastasis from UT Austin to University of Puerto Rico. Her laboratory researches breast cancer metastasis and the related molecular mechanisms of signal transaction. She also characterizes pharmacological and natural inhibitors of cancer metastasis. Dharmawardhane has experience with biochemical and molecular analysis of breast cancer cell therapeutics. She conducts much of her research with mouse models.

Dharmawardhane mentors researchers from the undergraduate level to assistant professors. She aims to help mentor women and minorities in biomedical research and academia.
