= Concepción Quiñones de Longo =

Puerto Rican pediatrician and government official

Secretary of Health of Puerto Rico
- Interim
- In office March 13, 2020 – March 26, 2020
- Governor: Wanda Vázquez Garced
- Preceded by: Rafael Rodríguez Mercado
- Succeeded by: Lorenzo González Feliciano

Personal details
- Children: Dennise Longo Quiñones
- Education: Interamerican University of Puerto Rico; University of Puerto Rico School of Medicine (MD)
- Occupation: Pediatrician, government official
- Medical career
- Field: Pediatrics
- Institutions: University of Puerto Rico School of Medicine; Puerto Rico Department of Health

Concepción Quiñones de Longo is a Puerto Rican pediatrician and government official. She was the interim Secretary of Health of Puerto Rico in March 2020 and had previously served as the undersecretary of Rafael Rodríguez Mercado. Quiñones de Longo is a former faculty member of the University of Puerto Rico School of Medicine.

== Education ==
Quiñones de Longo completed a bachelor's degree in premedical studies at the Interamerican University of Puerto Rico. She completed a doctor of medicine at the University of Puerto Rico School of Medicine. She completed a residency in pediatrics at the University District Hospital in San Juan.

== Career ==
Starting in 1973, Quiñones de Longo worked as a pediatrician instructor at the University of Puerto Rico School of Medicine. She was a faculty member at the school of medicine and the University Pediatric Hospital for 36 years. In the 1980s, Quiñones de Longo assisted the Puerto Rico Department of Health with pediatric centers for children with special needs and hospital accreditation. From 2008 to 2012, she served as the undersecretary to the Secretary of Health of Puerto Rico. Her work in Human Papillomavirus (HPV) vaccination helped prevent HPV and cervical cancers in Puerto Rico.

While serving as undersecretary in 2020, Quiñones de Longo reported Department irregularities to Secretary Rafael Rodríguez Mercado. Following Rodríguez Mercado's resignation on March 13, 2020, she served as the interim Secretary of Health for two weeks before resigning on March 26, 2020. Quiñones de Longo was succeeded by Lorenzo González Feliciano. She expressed concerns about how contracts for COVID-19 tests were awarded. In April 2020, Quiñones de Longo was questioned by the House of Representatives of Puerto Rico where she stated that Marisol Blasco, an assistant to the Governor, and the Chief of Staff of Puerto Rico, Antonio Pabón, both called her to request that she quickly sign a contract.

== Personal life ==
From 1971 to 1973, Quiñones de Longo resided in the contiguous United States before returning to Puerto Rico. She is the mother of lawyer and government official Dennise Longo Quiñones.

== See also ==
- COVID-19 pandemic in Puerto Rico
- Women in medicine
