= Murder of Lorenzo González Cacho =

Unsolved murder of an 8-year-old boy in Puerto Rico

- Date: March 9, 2010; 16 years ago
- Time: Prior to 5:00 am (AST)
- Location: Dorado, Puerto Rico
- Type: Murder
- Cause: Blunt force impacts and stabbing wounds
- Motive: Unknown
- Target: Lorenzo González Cacho
- Perpetrator: Unknown (disputed)
- Participants: Unknown (disputed)
- Outcome: Unsolved
- Deaths: Lorenzo González Cacho (aged 8)
- Burial: Porta Coeli Cemetery; Bayamón, Puerto Rico
- Coroner: Carlos Chávez
- Arrests: Luis Gustavo Rivera Seijo ("El Manco")
- Suspects: Ana Cacho González; Jesús Genaro Camacho; Arnaldo "Naldy" Colón; William Marrero Rivera; Luis Gustavo Rivera Seijo ("El Manco")
- Convicted: None
- Charges: Rivera Seijo: negligence, obstruction of justice and suspicion of murder (dropped)

Lorenzo Ahmed González Cacho (November 29, 2001 – March 9, 2010) was an eight-year-old Puerto Rican boy who was murdered on March 9, 2010 in his home in Dorado, Puerto Rico. At the time of his death, his mother, Ana Cacho González, and two sisters were at the house. The case gained notoriety in the island for the discrepancies and irregularities surrounding the crime scene, the evidence and testimonies. This led to the accusation of the boy's mother, Ana Cacho González, along with three males as potential suspects by the Secretary of Justice of Puerto Rico Guillermo Somoza, who took over the post after his predecessor, Antonio Sagardía, resigned to become Cacho González's attorney.

On March 9, 2015, on the fifth anniversary of the boy's murder, the Puerto Rico Justice Department announced that the accused were no longer suspects. Almost a year later, on March 7, 2016, the Puerto Rico Department of Justice announced that first degree murder charges would be filed against Luis Gustavo Rivera Seijo ("El Manco") for the child's death. The charges were dropped twice in 2016, first on April 28, due to lack of evidence that could prove his presence in Cacho's residence, and again on June 7, in an appeal trial.

== Background ==
Lorenzo González Cacho was born on November 29, 2001 to Ahmed Alí González and Ana Cacho González and was the middle child of two sisters. From an early age, González Cacho showed interest in sports, and was active in a soccer team. He was studying at Dorado Academy in his hometown. At the time of Lorenzo's death, his parents were in the process of divorcing when his sisters were approximately 13 and 5 years old.

== Death ==
On March 9, 2010, Ana Cacho took Lorenzo to the Diagnostic and Treatment Center in Dorado, Puerto Rico. Cacho arrived between 5 am and 5:30 am AST with Lorenzo covered in blood; the child was later pronounced dead at the clinic. Upon questioning, Cacho claimed that her son had fallen from his bed at their home in Dorado del Mar, however, this version was discarded by the autopsy which revealed severe injuries to the face and head, which included three stab wounds to the face.

== Suspects ==
Although no charges have been filed, the Puerto Rico Department of Justice identified six people considered suspects in the death of Lorenzo. All, but Rivera Seijo, were no longer considered as suspects in the case on March 9, 2015, five years after the murder. Rivera Seijo was the only suspect to receive charges, which were dropped in 2016.

- Ana Cacho González – Lorenzo's mother. She was identified as a suspect by the Department of Justice on March 19, 2010, nine days after the murder of the boy. Her two daughters were removed from her home on March 30, 2010, and they have not had any contact since. She has insisted her innocence throughout the process of the case
- Jesús Genaro Camacho – Cacho's boyfriend at the time of the murder, identified as a suspect on October 26, 2011. He has denied being present in the Cacho residence when the murder occurred and has also maintained his innocence.
- Arnaldo "Naldy" Colón – A friend of Cacho, rumored to have been at the Cacho residence the night of the murder.
- William Marrero Rivera – A U.S. Immigration and Customs Enforcement (ICE) agent, identified as a suspect by the authorities in August 2012, who was also allegedly present in the Cacho residence on the night of the murder.
- Luis Gustavo Rivera Seijo ("El Manco") – A homeless man with a previously-diagnosed mental disorder, who was incorrectly released from jail on the night of the murder. Rivera Seijo, whose nickname is literally translated to English as "the one-armed man" (missing left forearm), grew up in Dorado del Mar, the same neighborhood of Cacho's residence.

== Controversy ==
The case gained widespread notoriety throughout the island when the gossip-news show SuperXclusivo began to closely follow it and conduct independent investigations. While following the case, a number of irregularities were alleged, among these is the crime scene, which was not secured and was immediately cleaned after it had already been seen by investigators, but before forensics could thoroughly analyze it. Ana Cacho's father met with the Governor of Puerto Rico at the time, Luis Fortuño, and handed him a mysterious envelope. The Secretary of Justice at the time, Antonio Sagardía, resigned his post towards the end of 2009 to represent Ana Cacho as her lawyer, which was publicly criticized as an unethical move, and expressed her client was "a victim of the media".

Luis Gustavo Rivera Seijo ("El Manco") was shown to have been diagnosed with mental problems. He had confessed to the murder at the beginning of the investigation and several other times, sometimes retracting his own confessions. According to authorities, Rivera Seijo's confessions weren't considered valid at first because they didn't add up and the claimed murder weapon was never found. On March 8, 2016, Judge Jessica Morales determined probable cause for the arrest for murder against Rivera Seijo for the death of Lorenzo González Cacho. On April 28, 2016, another judge explained the confession was full of errors and that there was a lack of forensic evidence to confirm that Rivera Seijo was present at the Cacho residence at the time of the murder. Charges of negligence, obstruction of justice and suspicion of murder against him were dropped.

== See also ==
- Death of Caylee Anthony
- Death of Liliana Barbarita Cepeda
- Killing of Victoria Martens
- List of unsolved murders (2000–present)
