= José Álvarez de Choudens =

Puerto Rican neurosurgeon and politician

Dr. José Álvarez de Choudens

Secretary of Health of Puerto Rico
- In office 1974–1976
- Governor: Rafael Hernández Colón
- Preceded by: Ernesto Colón Yordán
- Succeeded by: Jaime Rivera Dueño

Personal details
- Born: April 25, 1922 Arroyo, Puerto Rico
- Died: February 1, 2003 (aged 80) Trujillo Alto, Puerto Rico
- Party: Popular Democratic Party
- Education: University of Maryland School of Medicine (M.D.)
- Occupation: Neurosurgeon

José Álvarez de Choudens (April 25, 1922 – February 1, 2003) was a neurosurgeon and Secretary of Health of Puerto Rico. He was recognized for pioneering the accreditation of neurosurgical training programs in Puerto Rico and for strengthening the island's public health infrastructure.

== Early life and education ==
Álvarez de Choudens was born in 1922 in Arroyo and completed his secondary education in local public schools before enrolling in pre-medical studies at the University of Puerto Rico, Río Piedras. He earned his medical degree at the University of Maryland School of Medicine in 1944, completed an internship at St. Agnes Hospital in Baltimore, served in the United States Army during WWII and assigned to the '19th General Hospital' which was in Frankfurt, Germany. Finalized neurosurgical training at Maryland by 1951. Álvarez de Choudens was a member of the Phi Sigma Alpha fraternity.

== Medical career ==
Returning to Puerto Rico in 1947, Álvarez de Choudens worked as a general surgeon before pursuing neurosurgery training. In 1951, he became the third neurosurgeon on the island and later directed the neurosurgery service at San Juan's Municipal Hospital and at the San Juan VA Medical Center.

He co-led efforts with neurosurgeon Nathan Rifkinson to gain official residency accreditation for neurosurgery at the University of Puerto Rico's Medical Sciences Campus. Puerto Rico's program achieved accreditation in 1970 under their leadership.

== Politics ==
In 1973, Governor Rafael Hernández Colón appointed him Secretary of Health. Serving through approximately 1976, he focused on enhancing equitable healthcare delivery—implementing Medicaid pilot programs, establishing public health networks, and pressing for hospital regionalization.

During his tenure, he was respected for confronting systemic limitations—such as malnutrition and facility shortages—and promoting a balanced allocation of resources, even amid competing healthcare demands.

== Notable legal cases ==
He appeared in two significant Puerto Rico Supreme Court cases involving his administrative role:

Árcelay Rivera v. Álvarez de Choudens (106 D.P.R. 196, 1977): The Supreme Court rejected a request challenging pharmacy regulations issued under his authority.

Álvarez de Choudens v. Tribunal Superior (103 D.P.R. 235, 1975): The Court discussed his authority to oversee government personnel assignments.

== Additional recognition ==
In 1982, Álvarez de Choudens was appointed Medical Director of Triple S (Seguros de Servicios de Salud de Puerto Rico, Inc.), a major healthcare insurance provider affiliated with the Blue Shield Association. His appointment was announced jointly by Triple S president Dr. Alfred L. Axtmayer and executive director Juan Labadie Eurite. Prior to this role, Álvarez de Choudens had served on the company's board of directors from 1962 to 1967, including as its president from 1965 to 1966. He returned to the board in 1969 and remained until March 25, 1982, when he resigned to assume the new executive position.

In the announcement, Triple S celebrated his long and distinguished medical and public health service, noting his prior leadership as Secretary of Health, president of the Puerto Rico Medical Association (1956), and founder of the neurosurgical residency at the UPR School of Medicine. In 1982, Álvarez de Choudens was honored by the Puerto Rico Medical Association (Asociación Médica de Puerto Rico) for his decades of service to medicine and public health. The recognition highlighted his pioneering role in neurosurgery and his commitment to the public healthcare system during his tenure as Secretary of Health.
