= Ana Ríus Armendáriz =

Secretary of Health of Puerto Rico
- In office 16 September 2013 – 31 December 2016
- Governor: Alejandro García Padilla
- Preceded by: Francisco Joglar
- Succeeded by: Rafael Rodríguez Mercado

Personal details
- Born: c. 1953 Cuba
- Party: Popular Democratic Party
- Education: University of Puerto Rico School of Medicine
- Occupation: Anesthesiologist

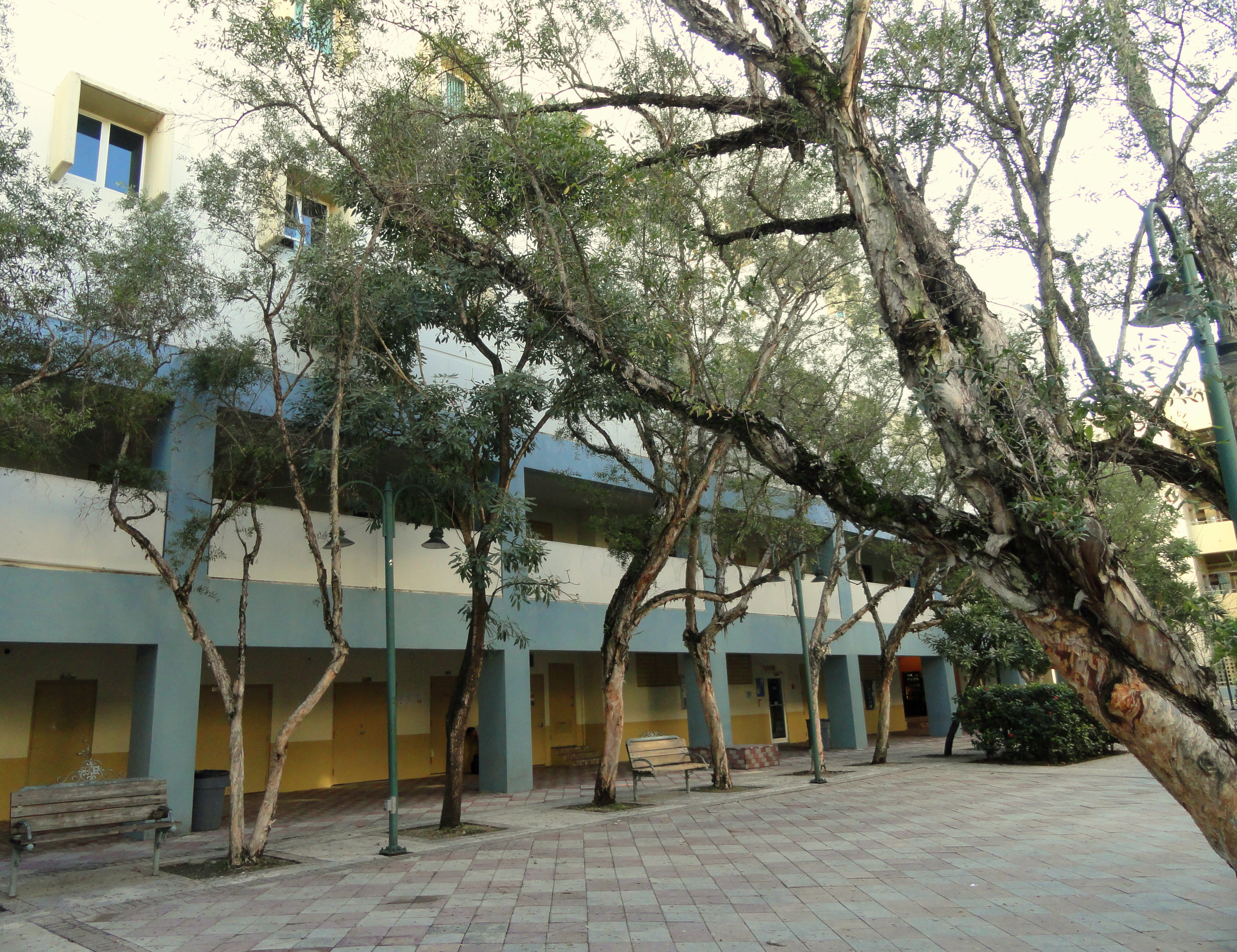
One of the buildings where Ana taught her students in the University of Puerto Rico

Ana Ríus Armendáriz is a Puerto Rican politician who was Secretary of Health of Puerto Rico in the Cabinet of Puerto Rico.

== Education ==
Ana went to the University of Puerto Rico School of Medicine, with a degree in anesthesiology. Soon after that, she became an intern in the San Juan VA Medical Center, specializing in internal medicine.

== Post Graduation ==
Armendáriz became a professor of Anesthesiology the University of Puerto Rico School of Medicine. During her 28-year stint, she managed to teach hundreds of students about the field. After moving on from teaching, she was appointed as executive director of the Puerto Rico Medical Services Administration from November 2002 to February 2009. She then went back to teaching, until she was appointed as Secretary of Health.

== Secretary of Health of Puerto Rico ==
Armendáriz was appointed as Secretary of Health on September 16, 2013, by Governor Alejandro García Padilla.

=== Medical Marijuana ===
On May 4, 2015, Puerto Rico legalized medical marijuana. Armendariz worked to ensure that there would be appropriate regulations concerning the legalization, including: how it'll be dispensed, what diagnosis will be required, and who will produce it.

Armendariz also drew up a plan as to when marijuana will be allowed into the territory. She issued that suppliers can start their distribution as early as August, 2015.

=== Zika ===
In early 2015, the Zika outbreak struck Puerto Rico. She expressed the following views of the Zika Epidemic to Outbreak News Today, "The virus is transmitted by the mosquito Aedes aegypti, the same mosquito that transmits dengue and chikungunya. That is why we want to educate the population about their symptoms and prevention measures to be taken"
