= Iván González Cancel =

Puerto Rican politician

Iván F. González Cancel
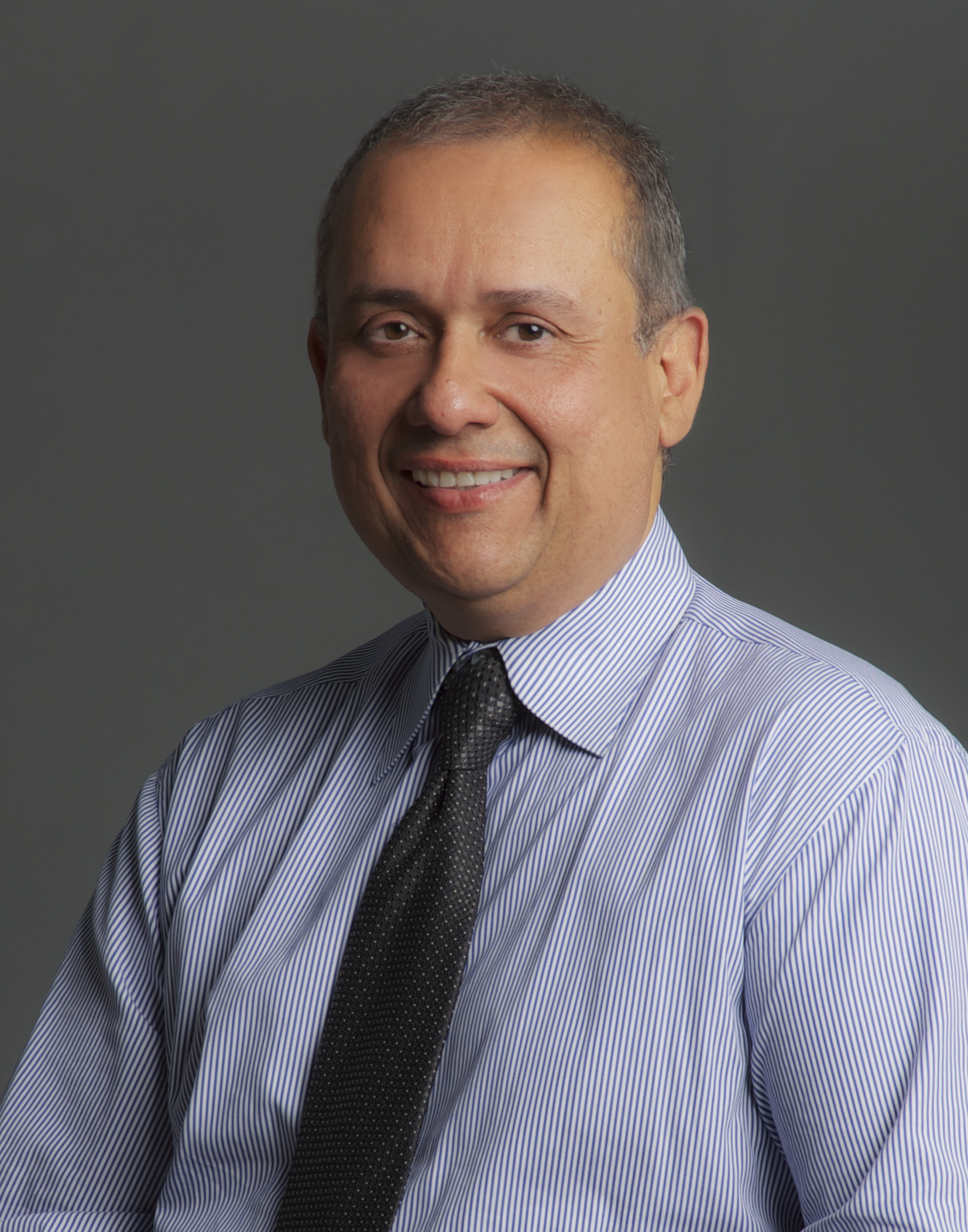

Secretary of Health of Puerto Rico
- In office 2009–2009
- Governor: Luis Fortuño
- Preceded by: Jaime Rivera Dueño
- Succeeded by: Lorenzo González Feliciano

Personal details
- Born: 1960 (age 65–66) Utuado, Puerto Rico
- Party: Democratic Party; New Progressive Party
- Spouse: Jannett Alicea
- Education: University of Puerto Rico (B.S.); University of Puerto Rico School of Medicine (M.D.)
- Profession: Physician
- Website: www.gonzalezcancel.com

Iván F. González Cancel is a cardiovascular and heart transplant surgeon credited for having performed the first heart transplant surgery in Puerto Rico.

== Early life ==
He was born in 1960 in municipality of Utuado, Puerto Rico. He lived in Utuado until the age of 10, when the González Cancel family decided to move to Bayamon, PR. It was in Bayamon where the young Iván González Cancel studied fifth and sixth grade. In 1970 his family had move once again, this time to the community of Levittown in Toa Baja, Puerto Rico. He conducted all his elementary and high school studies in the Public School System of Puerto Rico.

== Education ==
In 1977 he was admitted to the University of Puerto Rico, Rio Piedras Campus where he earned a Bachelor of Science and in 1980 enrolled in the University of Puerto Rico School of Medicine. During his medical studies he decided to become a Surgeon and in 1989 joined the Puerto Rico Medical Center Surgery Residency Program. After being told that at that time becoming a Cardiovascular Surgeon was impossible and that he should forget about it; in 1989 he joins the Cardiovascular Surgery faculty at the University of Alberta in Edmonton, Canada. After completing his training in Cardiovascular Surgery he decides to pursue a fellowship at the University of Pittsburgh in Heart and Lung Transplant.

== Return to Puerto Rico and the First Heart Transplant in Puerto Rico ==
In 1993 after completing his training in mainland United States he returned to Puerto Rico to practice as a Cardiovascular and Heart Transplant Surgeon. It is in 1999 when he makes history by conducting the first heart transplant surgery in Puerto Rico. On June 27, 1999, Dr.Iván González Cancel along with a group of healthcare professionals performed the surgery which took 3 hours and 17 minutes at the Cardiovascular Center of Puerto Rico. Among the group of physicians that participated in the successful surgery were: Dr. Héctor Banchs Pieretti, Dr. Cid Quintana, Dr. Rolando Colón, Dr. Héctor Delgado Osorio and Dr. Efraín Defendini.

Mr. Laureano Cora Solis, 52 years old and resident of Arroyo, Puerto Rico was the patient to receive the transplanted organ donated by the family of Arlyne Odette Acevedo Molina—a woman from Hatillo, Puerto Rico who was the victim of a fatal car accident.

== Legacy ==
Since then, Dr. González Cancel and his team have conducted a total of 125 heart transplants in Puerto Rico. Due to the success rate of these surgeries, and the outcome of his patients, Dr. González Cancel achieved the status of a prominent surgeon in Puerto Rico and the United States.

== Political career ==
Dr. Iván González Cancel is regarded as a prominent Democrat and Statehood supporter. He has met President Bill Clinton and many mainland politicians. He has made financial contributions to the NPP party in Puerto Rico and to Democrats in the United States.

=== Secretary of Health of Puerto Rico ===
In 2009, Dr. Gonzalez Cancel was nominated by Governor Luis Fortuño as Secretary of Health of Puerto Rico.

Tapped as secretary of Health in 2009, he ran into trouble when Fortuño withdrew his nomination. "I refused to participate in a proposed scheme tainted by corruption, and I didn't want to give up surgery completely so he pounced on the excuse to withdraw my nomination," said González Cancel, who said he would give up all his medical positions if he were to become governor. In fact, the short stint at the Health Department probably sparked his interest in public service and launched him on his path to the governorship.

=== Campaign for Governor of Puerto Rico 2012 ===
"Nothing is more anti-statehood than corruption", says the man who aspires to challenge Gov. Fortuño for La Fortaleza, on a platform which overturns almost every assumption his own party has promoted. "This administration doesn't show any interest in finding out about corruption, which destroys every effort to improve the life of Puerto Ricans," cardiologist Dr. Iván González Cancel told the Daily Sun in an interview Saturday, the same day he opened his 2012 primary campaign office.

=== NPP Primary ===
The subject of corruption is not a plank in his platform, but rather a shadow that hovers over every reform and project, according to González Cancel, who must get 10,000 endorsement signatures before challenging the incumbent governor to an inter-party primary race in March. The signature campaign must wait until Oct. 1, when he officially presents his candidacy as a candidate for governor for the New Progressive Party. "I expect to do that in one or two weeks, and when that obstacle is surmounted, we will begin developing a campaign strategy for the primaries," said the Utuado native. So far, the road has appeared rocky, as he meets criticism and obstacles at every turn, engineered by his potential opponent, Fortuño, and the NPP machine. The avid statehood supporter can't see why Fortuño is "offended by being challenged, given that [his election] came from having made a primary fight against former NPP Gov. Pedro Rosselló."

Non-profit organization positions
Preceded by Jaime Rivera Dueno	Health Secretary of Puerto Rico; 2009	Succeeded by Lorenzo González Feliciano
