= Triple-S Management Corporation =

Insurance holding company based in San Juan, Puerto Rico

- Industry: Insurance
- Founded: 1959; 67 years ago, in San Juan, Puerto Rico
- Products: Insurance; Medical insurance; Life insurance; Property insurance
- Number of employees: 3,420 (2017)
- Parent: GuideWell
- Website: TripleSManagement.com

The Triple-S Management Corporation (TSM) —commonly known as Triple-S, or SSS— is an insurance holding company based in San Juan, Puerto Rico, which offers a wide range of insurance products and services in Puerto Rico through its wholly owned subsidiaries. Its headquarters are located at 1441 Franklin D. Roosevelt Ave., in the San Patricio section of San Juan.

Triple-S is the leading managed care company in Puerto Rico. With over one million customers, in addition to its core managed care business, TSM operates two complementary businesses in life, and property and casualty insurance. Founded in 1959, it has become the largest medical insurance provider in Puerto Rico thanks to its licensed affiliation with the Blue Cross Blue Shield Association. Since 1965, Triple-S, Inc. has been an independent licensee of the Blue Cross Blue Shield Association, holding the exclusive rights to the Blue Cross Blue Shield name and trademark in Puerto Rico and the US Virgin Islands. This provides its members with access to the Blue Card network in the U.S. It is the only managed-care company that serves all market sectors, including Medicare, Medicaid, Group and Individual, in Puerto Rico.

== History timeline ==
- 1959: A group of physicians and dentists establish Seguros de Servicios de Salud. Among the members of the first board of directors was Ernesto Colón Yordán who was also one of the founders
- 1966: Triple-S, Inc. manages Medicare Part B in Puerto Rico once Medicare is created.
- 1984: Triple-S enters the life insurance market to complement its managed care offerings and creates Seguros de Vida Triple-S.
- 1988: As part of a diversification strategy, the company enters the property and casualty insurance market and establishes Seguros Triple-S.
- 1995: Triple-S is awarded a contract to provide services to the Puerto Rico Health Reform.
- 1999: Stockholders create Triple-S Management Corporation (TSM), a holding company, to facilitate the growth and diversification of the business.
- 2005: Triple-S, Inc. begins its participation in the Medicare Advantage segment.
- 2006: TSM acquires Great American Life Assurance Company of Puerto Rico (GA Life) and after its merger with Seguros de Vida Triple-S, it becomes Triple-S Vida, the leading life insurance company in Puerto Rico.
- 2007: TSM is the first Puerto Rican managed care company to become a public company trading its shares in the New York Stock Exchange, under the symbol GTS (Grupo Triple-S).
- 2009: Grupo Triple-S celebrates its 50th anniversary and renews its corporate identity. Triple-S Salud, Inc. completes the purchase of certain managed care assets of La Cruz Azul de Puerto Rico and is awarded the Blue Cross license, thereby becoming in the Blue Cross Blue Shield Association licensee of Puerto Rico and the US Virgin Islands.
- 2011: TSM acquires American Health Medicare, a Medicare Advantage services provider over 40,000 members.
- 2012: Triple-S Salud creates Blue Cross Blue Shield of the U.S. Virgin Islands and enters the USVI market to offer health insurance products to the commercial segment.
- 2013: Triple-S Salud is selected as administrator for all the regions of the Puerto Rico Government Health Plan. The corporation lays the foundation for its expansion to international markets through Triple-S Vida's acquisition of Atlantic Southern Insurance Company (ASICO), with headquarters in Puerto Rico and operations in the US Virgin Islands, British Virgin Islands, Anguilla and Costa Rica.
- 2014: ASICO is rebranded as Triple-S Blue and its expansion into Latin America starts with the launch of the BCBS Costa Rica brand. The brands of AHM and Triple-S Salud Medicare Advantage division are consolidated and rebranded as Triple-S Advantage
- 2015: The introduction to Cristina Bazán, Puerto Rico's highest grossing soap opera of all time, was reshot and used for a television commercial for Triple-S, 38 years after the success of the original. The advertisement was created by J. Walter Thompson for Triple-S, a health insurance company, to encourage Puerto Ricans to enroll in health plans.
- 2015: The introduction to Cristina Bazán, Puerto Rico's highest grossing soap opera of all time, was reshot and used for a television commercial for Triple-S, 38 years after the success of the original. The advertisement was created by J. Walter Thompson for Triple-S, a health insurance company, to encourage Puerto Ricans to enroll in health plans.
- 2022 - acquired by GuideWell

== Competitors (in Puerto Rico) ==
- Humana
- Puerto Rico Life Insurance Cooperative (Cooperativa de Seguro de Vida de Puerto Rico, or COSVI, in Spanish)
- MCS
- MMM
- First Medical
- Universal Insurance
- MAPFRE
- ASC
