= Death of Liliana Barbarita Cepeda =

1997 death of a child in Puerto Rico

The death of Liliana "Barbarita" Cepeda was a child's death that caused commotion in Puerto Rico during 1997. Investigations into the case caused confusion among the general public, because at first it had been claimed by Puerto Rican police that Cepeda had been raped and murdered, then it was alleged that she died accidentally.

Liliana Barbara "Barbarita" Cepeda Casado (1990–1997) was a young Puerto Rican girl of African descent. On April 30, 2013, she was—along with Lorenzo Gonzalez Cacho and several other children who have disappeared or died violent deaths in Puerto Rico—remembered at Puerto Rico's Capitol, during a ceremony to promote reduction of mistreatment of minors in Puerto Rico.

== Case ==
Liliana Barbarita Cepeda Casado was with her family enjoying a day at the beach swimming on June 8, 1997, when she first disappeared at El Escambrón Beach in San Juan. People began looking for her all over the beach and under water.

Her body was found on June 9, in the basement of an abandoned building that hosted what was once an Olympic-sized swimming pool used for the 1979 Pan American Games water competitions.

Initially it was said that she had been raped, beaten and murdered. Days after that announcement, however, police recanted, declaring her death as an accidental one. During a press conference, Pedro Toledo, superintendent of the Puerto Rico Police, later held another press conference, where he admitted his comments could have been misleading. "At that time, I understood that we had to put an end to the hysteria (surrounding the case)" Toledo told the press that day.

On November 16, 1998, Jose Luis Ortiz Vega, Barbarita's stepfather and Eugenio J. Rodriguez Galindo were arrested and charged with the kidnapping and murder of Cepeda Casado. During a preliminary court hearing on December 16 of that year, it was determined there was probable cause to accuse the two of first degree murder and of kidnapping, in addition to gun law violations. A third man, named Eliezer Santana Baez, testified he had witnessed some of what the other two men had been accused of doing. Santana Baez, however, had also declared that he was not there when Cepeda Casado died and that he had been coerced to lie by authorities.

It was later argued by the two accused men's defense that some of the evidence offered by prosecution had been in the hands of the public ministry and that they had not been handed to defense until the day of a hearing, 15 January 1999, and as such, the accusations should be discarded. These motions were later dismissed by jury.

Six months after being jailed in 1998, both Ortiz Vega and Rodriguez Galindo had to be released due to being jailed without a trial.

Santana Baez later alleged that he had lied about the case and a judge then found no cause against Rodriguez Galindo. Santana Baez was later found guilty of the murder of a Puerto Rican dancer.

Ortiz Vega died of AIDS.
