= Janet Parra Mercado =

Puerto Rican politician and lawyer

Janet Parra

Secretary of Justice of Puerto Rico
- Acting
- In office January 2, 2025 – May 8, 2025
- Governor: Jenniffer González
- Preceded by: Domingo Emanuelli
- Succeeded by: Lourdes Gómez

Personal details
- Born: Bayamón, Puerto Rico
- Party: New Progressive
- Education: University of Puerto Rico, Río Piedras (BA, JD)

Janet Parra Mercado is a Puerto Rican politician and lawyer who served as the secretary of Justice-designate of Puerto Rico from January 2 to May 8, 2025.

== Early life ==
Graduated from Colegio Santa Rosa in Bayamón, Puerto Rico. Earned a Bachelor degree in Labor Relations from the University of Puerto Rico and a Juris Doctor from the University of Puerto Rico School of Law.

== Professional life ==
Parra Mercado was a prosecutor and head of the organized crime division of the Puerto Rico Department of Justice. As of 2024, she was a member of the New Progressive Party platform committee and a private practice lawyer.

On January 2, 2025, she was appointed secretary of justice of Puerto Rico by governor Jenniffer González-Colón.

On May 8, 2025, while awaiting confirmation by the Senate for her cabinet position, Governor Jenniffer González withdrew her nomination after Senate President Thomas Rivera Schatz indicated that Parra would not have the votes needed for confirmation.

Legal offices
| Preceded by Domingo Emanuelli | Secretary of Justice of Puerto Rico; Acting; 2025 | Succeeded by Lourdes Gómez |
