= Lourdes Gómez Torres =

Lourdes Gómez
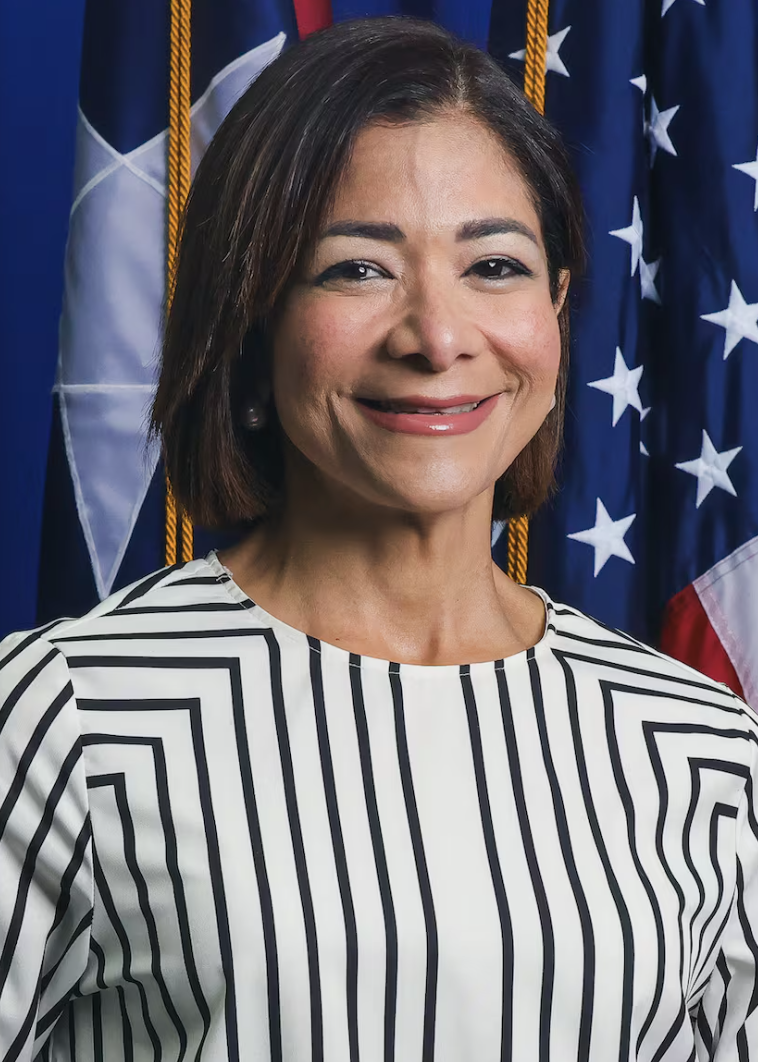

Secretary of Justice of Puerto Rico
- Incumbent
- Assumed office May 27, 2025; Acting: May 27, 2025 – June 9, 2025
- Governor: Jenniffer González
- Preceded by: Janet Parra Mercado (acting)

Personal details
- Born: Ponce, Puerto Rico
- Children: 1
- Education: Pontifical Catholic University of Puerto Rico (BA, JD)

Lourdes Lynnette Gómez Torres is a Puerto Rican politician and lawyer serving as the Secretary of Justice of Puerto Rico.

== Early life and education ==
Gómez Torres's mother was a teacher and her father a lawyer. She earned a bachelor degree in psychology from the Pontifical Catholic University of Puerto Rico in 1998 and a J.D. from Pontifical Catholic University of Puerto Rico School of Law in 2004.

== Career ==
Following passing the bar, Gómez Torres worked for her father's law firm, Alfonso J. Gómez Rubert until 2009. From 2009 to 2012, she was the director of the legal division at the Administration for Child Support (ASUME). She was a family affairs attorney in the Puerto Rico Department of Justice from 2012 to 2022. She also worked as an administrator of the municipality of Ponce, Puerto Rico and assistant secretary of administration for the Puerto Rico Department of State. Gómez Torres was appointed a judge of the Superior Courts of Puerto Rico in 2022 where she served until December 2024. At that time, she became director of Judicial and Executive Appointments Office of La Fortaleza.

In May 2025, she was nominated by Jenniffer González-Colón to serve as the Secretary of Justice of Puerto Rico following the stalled nomination of Janet Parra Mercado. That month, as the Justice Secretary-designate, Gómez Torres stated she aimed to leverage her public service record to restore the Puerto Rico Department of Justice's image by recruiting anti-corruption prosecutors, expanding resources for crime victims, and strengthening collaborations with local and federal law enforcement. During her confirmation hearing for Justice Secretary in June 2025, Gómez Torres established her legal stance that abortion in Puerto Rico is strictly governed by the Penal Code. She emphasized that her agency's policy would be to protect life from conception and treat abortion as a crime with specific exceptions.

== Personal life ==
Gómez Torres has a son.

Legal offices
Preceded by Janet Parra Mercado; Acting	Secretary of Justice of Puerto Rico; 2025–present	Incumbent
