= Miguel Giménez Muñoz =

Puerto Rican attorney and politician

Secretary of Justice of Puerto Rico (Note: The role Secretary of Justice of Puerto Rico is also known as Attorney General of Puerto Rico)
- In office 1977–1981
- Governor: Carlos Romero Barceló
- Preceded by: Carlos R. Rios-Gautier
- Succeeded by: Hector Reichard de Cardona

Personal details
- Born: October 7, 1929 Santurce, Puerto Rico, US
- Died: January 6, 2022 (aged 92) Guaynabo, Puerto Rico, US
- Education: Niagara University (BA); Mercer University (JD); University of Nevada, Reno (LLB)

Miguel Giménez Muñoz (October 7, 1929 – January 6, 2022) was a Puerto Rican attorney and politician. He served as secretary of justice of Puerto Rico from 1977 to 1981.

== Life and career ==
Muñoz was born in Santurce, Puerto Rico. He earned a juris doctor from Mercer University in Macon, Georgia a BA in history from Niagara University, and a Bachelor of Laws from the University of Nevada, Reno. He was also a veteran of the Korean War where he served as a lieutenant in the Armed Forces.

Muñoz served as superior judge, secretary of justice of Puerto Rico from 1977 to 1981 and also worked as a prosecutor, judge, and lawyer. He was appointed as Superior Judge and Judge of the Puerto Rico Court of Appeals.

Muñoz died on January 6, 2022 in Guaynabo, Puerto Rico at the age of 92, He was buried at Los Ángeles Memorial Park Cemetery, in Guaynabo.

== Notes ==
Legal offices
Preceded by Carlos R. Rios-Gautier	Secretary of Justice of Puerto Rico; 1977–1981	Succeeded by Hector Reichard de Cardona
