= César Miranda =

Secretary of Justice of Puerto Rico

18th Secretary of Justice of Puerto Rico
- In office January 13, 2014 – January 2, 2017
- Governor: Alejandro García Padilla
- Preceded by: Luis Sánchez Betances
- Succeeded by: Wanda Vázquez Garced

3rd Chief of Staff of Puerto Rico
- In office August 2, 2001 – January 2, 2005
- Governor: Sila María Calderón
- Preceded by: Angel Morey
- Succeeded by: Aníbal José Torres

Personal details
- Born: Coamo, Puerto Rico
- Party: Popular Democratic
- Other political affiliations: Democratic
- Education: University of Puerto Rico, Río; Piedras (BBA); Rutgers University, Camden (JD)

César R. Miranda Rodríguez (born in Coamo, Puerto Rico), is an attorney and former Secretary of Justice of Puerto Rico. Miranda was formerly Vice President of the Puerto Rico Telephone Company and Chief of Staff for governor Sila María Calderón. Miranda substituted for Luis Sánchez Betances after Sánchez Bentances resigned effective December 31, 2013. Miranda Rodríguez served as deputy secretary of Justice during the second administration of Governor Rafael Hernández Colón in the 1980s when Héctor Rivera Cruz led the agency. He was a law professor UPR School of Law. He holds a bachelor's degree in Business Administration with a concentration in Management and Accounting from the University of Puerto Rico and a Juris Doctor degree from Rutgers University–Camden in New Jersey.

== See also ==
- 16th Cabinet of Puerto Rico

Legal offices
Preceded by Luis Sánchez Betances	Secretary of Justice of Puerto Rico; 2014–2017	Succeeded by Wanda Vázquez Garced
