= Enrique Campos del Toro =

Puerto Rican attorney

- Born: 15 June 1898; Ponce, Puerto Rico
- Died: 28 February 1980 (aged 81); San Juan, Puerto Rico
- Known for: Founder, FirstBank, Attorney General of Puerto Rico
- Spouse: Margarita Ledesma de Campos del Toro
- Children: Sonia, Miriam, Margarita

Enrique Campos del Toro (15 June 1898 – 28 February 1980) was a Puerto Rican law professor, banker, and attorney general of Puerto Rico.

== Early years ==
Campos del Toro was born in Ponce, Puerto Rico, on 15 June 1898. He received his law degree from the University of Puerto Rico School of Law in 1923. Upon his graduation, he became a professor at said university from 1923 to 1924.

== Career ==
In 1936, Campos del Toro was appointed assistant to the Puerto Rico attorney general. In 1943 he was appointed president of the Puerto Rico Industrial Commission. In 1944, at a time when the Governor of Puerto Rico was still an appointee of the President of the United States, Campos del Toro was appointed Coordinator of Insular Affairs by the colonial Governor of Puerto Rico.

In April 1944, Campos del Toro became president of the Insular Labor Relations Board (ILRB). In 1945 the President of the United States appointed him Attorney General of Puerto Rico, a position he held for a year. Together with Teodoro Moscoso, Jorge Bird, Samuel Schweitzer, Rafael Carrion Jr., Guillermo Rodriguez Benitez, Luis Valiente and Alfonso Valdes, Campos del Toro is credited with having turned around the impoverished Puerto Rican economy of the first half of the 20th century and into an industrial/financial powerhouse with the highest standard of living in the Caribbean and Latin America.

In 1948, Campos del Toro founded El Diario de Puerto Rico (The Puerto Rico Daily), and in 1949 he founded the Puerto Rico Loan and Savings Association. He was president of First Federal Savings (today Firstbank) and a member of its governing board.

In the 1960s Campos del Toro wrote two books, The housing problem of Latin America and its possible solution, published in 1961, and Divagaciones de un hombre confundido (Madrid: Editorial Stanley: Unwin Books. Ediciones Iberoamericanas), published in 1967. In 1961 he also wrote Reflexiones minimas: artículos y conferencias (Mexico: Editorial Orion).

In June 1976, Campos del Toro was honored as the founder of Puerto Rico's first savings and loan association.

He died on 28 February 1980 of prostate cancer. He was buried at the Puerto Rico Memorial Cemetery in Carolina, Puerto Rico.

Legal offices
Preceded by Luis Negrón Fernández; Acting	Attorney General of Puerto Rico; 1945–1946	Succeeded by Luis Negrón Fernández

== See also ==
- List of Puerto Ricans
