= Secretary of Health of Puerto Rico =

Government of Puerto Rico

- Incumbent; Carlos Mellado López since January 2, 2021; 5 years ago
- Department of Health
- Nominator: Governor
- Appointer: Governor with advice and consent from the Senate
- Term length: 4 years
- Formation: Established by Law No. 81 of 1912 and Article IV of the Constitution of Puerto Rico
- Succession: Eight
- Website: www.salud.gov.pr

The Secretary of Health of Puerto Rico (Spanish: Secretario de Salud de Puerto Rico) leads the Department of Health of Puerto Rico and all efforts related to health in Puerto Rico.

== Secretaries ==
- 1969–1973: Ernesto Colón Yordán
- 1974-1976 José Álvarez de Choudens
- 1977–1984: Jaime Rivera Dueño
- 1985–1988: Luis Izquierdo Mora
- 1989: Enrique Méndez Grau
- 1990–1992: José Soler Zapata
- 1993: Enrique Vazquez Quintana
- 1993–2000: Carmen Feliciano
- 2001–2004: Johny Rullán
- 2005–2007: Rosa Pérez Perdomo
- 2008: Johnny Rullán
- 2009: Jaime Rivera Dueño
- 2009: Iván González Cancel
- 2009–2013: Lorenzo González Feliciano
- 2013–2013: Francisco Joglar Pesquera
- 2013–2016: Ana Ríus Armendáriz
- 2017–2020: Rafael Rodríguez Mercado
- 2020–2020: Concepción Quiñones de Longo (interim)
- 2020–2021: Lorenzo González Feliciano
- 2021–Present: Carlos Mellado López
