= Adán Nigaglioni Loyola =

Puerto Rican doctor and educator

- Born: Adán Nigaglioni Loyola; 12 January 1930; Peñuelas, Puerto Rico
- Died: 18 May 2016 (aged 86); Guaynabo, Puerto Rico
- Education: University of Puerto Rico School of Medicine (MD)
- Occupations: doctor and educator.

Adán Nigaglioni Loyola (12 January 1930 – 18 May 2016) was a Puerto Rican doctor and educator.

He graduated from the University of Puerto Rico School of Medicine in 1954 where he was top of his class. He did his internship at the Perelman School of Medicine at the University of Pennsylvania. He was a member of Phi Sigma Alpha fraternity. He was the first Puerto Rican and first alumni to be dean of the University of Puerto Rico School of Medicine from 1963 to 1967. In 1967, he became the first rector of the newly formed University of Puerto Rico, Medical Sciences Campus.

== Selected writings ==
- Apuntes Históricos Sobre la Fundación de la Escuela de Medicina de la Universidad de Puerto Rico (Vol 20, No 1 (2001): March - Cincuentenario de la Fundación de la Escuela de Medicina de la Universidad de Puerto Rico)
