= Guillermo Somoza =

Puerto Rican attorney

Secretary of Justice of Puerto Rico
- In office 2010–2012
- Governor: Luis Fortuño
- Preceded by: Antonio Sagardía
- Succeeded by: Luis Sánchez Betances

Personal details
- Born: January 26, 1966 (age 60) Hato Rey, Puerto Rico
- Party: New Progressive
- Education: University of Puerto Rico (BA); Interamerican University of Puerto Rico School of Law (JD)

Guillermo A. Somoza Colombani is an attorney and the former Secretary of Justice of Puerto Rico. He holds a BA in physiology from the University of Puerto Rico and obtained a JD from the Interamerican University of Puerto Rico School of Law. Somoza was appointed by Governor Luis Fortuño after the resignation of Antonio Sagardía and confirmed by the Puerto Rico Senate in May, 2010.

Somoza was appointed in 1997 by then-Governor Pedro Rosselló as a Minors Advocate, a post he held until promoted by Sagardía as head of the Minors and Family Advocates Division of the Puerto Rico Department of Justice.

In August 2018, Somoza was stopped by police for speeding in a Porsche while accompanied by his 17-year-old son. He was charged with negligence but the final resolution was to pay a $300 fine.

Legal offices
| Preceded by Antonio Sagardía | Secretary of Justice of Puerto Rico; 2010–2012 | Succeeded by Luis Sánchez Betances |
