= GuideWell =

Health insurer in Florida, United States

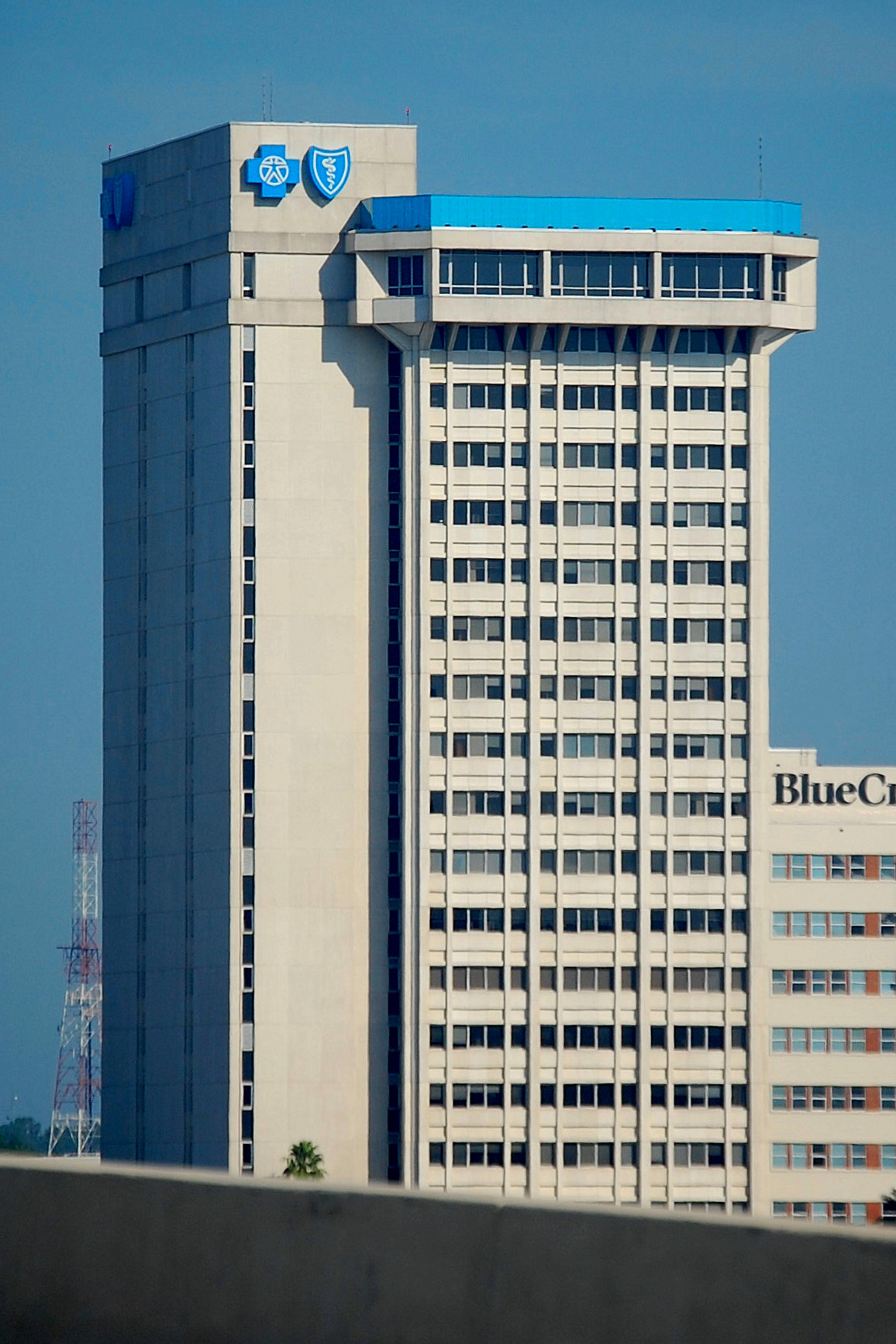
- Florida Blue Cross Blue Shield Tower, Jacksonville, Florida
- Type: Mutual
- Industry: Insurance and Healthcare Solutions
- Founded: April 27, 1944; 82 years ago in Jacksonville, Florida, U.S.
- Headquarters: Jacksonville, Florida, U.S.
- Key people: Brian Pieninck (President and CEO); Elizabeth "Betsy" Ferguson (General Counsel); Amish Patel (CIO)
- Products: Health Insurance
- Revenue: ▲US$32.4 billion (2024)
- Net income: ▼US$211 million (2024)
- Number of employees: ~18,000 (2023)

GuideWell, formally GuideWell Mutual Holding Corporation (holding company for Florida Blue), is a mutual insurance holding company primarily focused on health insurance in Florida. It was created in 2013 by a reorganization initiated by Florida Blue, a member company of the Blue Cross Blue Shield Association.By health insurance premiums written, it is 7th largest in providing health insurance in the United States with about $30b in health insurance sales as of 2024.

== History ==
It originally formed out of Florida Hospital Service Corporation founded in 1944, which became Blue Cross of Florida, and Florida Medical Services Corporation in 1946, which became Blue Shield of Florida. These merged in 1980 into Blue Cross and Blue Shield of Florida, which was renamed Florida Blue in 2012. In 2009, Florida Blue acquired Florida Health Care Plans. In 2022, GuideWell acquired Triple-S, which operated Blue Cross Blue Shield plans in Puerto Rico.

== Subsidiaries ==
The holding company controls corporations operating in insurance, health care providers, consumerism, and government.

Subsidiaries include:

- GuideWell Source - Medicare administrator
  - Novitas Solutions
  - First Coast Service Options
- WebTPA - third-party administrator
- Capital Health Plan
- Florida Health Care Plans
- Triple-S Management
