= Outbreak News Today =

American health news website

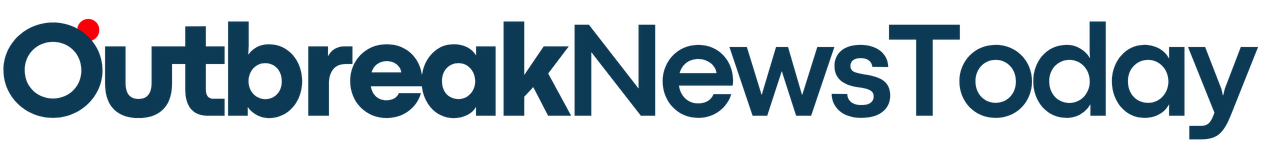
- Website type: Health news website
- Available in: English
- Founded: April 18, 2014; 12 years ago
- Headquarters: Austin, Texas, United States
- Area served: Worldwide
- Owner: Entrilex News Network LLC
- Website: outbreaknewstoday.com

Outbreak News Today is an English-language online health news website focused on infectious diseases, disease outbreaks, and global public health developments. It has operated since April 18, 2014, and is owned and managed by Entrilex News Network LLC.

== History ==
In 2026, Entrilex News Network LLC acquired Outbreak News Today, along with The Global Dispatch and Tampa Dispatch, as part of an expansion of its digital news portfolio. The reports stated that the acquisition took place on May 20, 2026, and that the acquired websites would continue to operate as separate publications.

== Use in disease surveillance ==
Outbreak News Today has been cited in public-health and disease-surveillance contexts. A 2025 article in Scientific Data on the Human Epidemic Database described Outbreak News Today as one of the unofficial outbreak aggregators monitored by digital surveillance experts, alongside sources such as ProMED-mail.

The Defense Health Agency's Armed Forces Health Surveillance Division included Outbreak News Today among the sources for a March 2026 Health Surveillance Update concerning avian influenza A(H5N1) in Cambodia.
