= Domingo Emanuelli =

Puerto Rican politician and lawyer

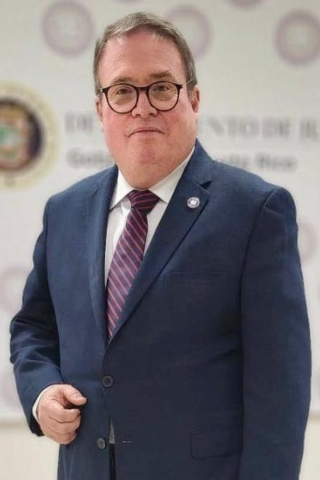

Secretary of Justice of Puerto Rico
- In office January 2, 2021 – January 2, 2025; Acting: January 2, 2021 – March 25, 2021
- Governor: Pedro Pierluisi
- Preceded by: Inés Del C. Carrau Martínez (acting)
- Succeeded by: Janet Parra Mercado (acting)

Personal details
- Born: Arecibo, Puerto Rico
- Party: New Progressive
- Education: University of Puerto Rico, Río Piedras (BA, JD)

Domingo Emanuelli Hernández is a Puerto Rican lawyer and politician who served as the secretary of justice of Puerto Rico from 2021 to early 2025.

== Education ==
Emanuelli completed a Bachelor of Arts degree, magna cum laude, in general studies from the University of Puerto Rico and a Juris Doctor, cum laude, from the University of Puerto Rico School of Law.

== Career ==
Emanuelli is a member of the Bar Association of Puerto Rico and admitted to practice in Puerto Rico, the United States District Court for the District of Puerto Rico, and the United States Court of Appeals for the First Circuit.

Emanuelli is a lawyer specialized in corporate, commercial, and civil litigation. He started his career at a law firm in Arecibo, Puerto Rico. As of 2021, Emanuelli had practiced law for over 43 years.

On January 2, 2021, governor Pedro Pierluisi nominated Emanuelli to serve as the secretary of justice of Puerto Rico. In March 2021, the senate confirmed his nomination. He succeeded acting secretary Inés Del C. Carrau Martínez. Emanuelli is a member of the New Progressive Party.

Legal offices
Preceded by Inés Del C. Carrau Martínez; Acting	Secretary of Justice of Puerto Rico; 2021–2025	Succeeded by Janet Parra Mercado; Acting
