= Jorge E. Pérez-Díaz =

Puerto Rican lawyer

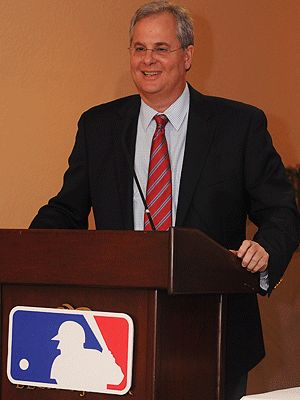

Secretary of Justice of Puerto Rico
- In office 1991–1992
- Governor: Rafael Hernández Colón
- Preceded by: Héctor Rivera Cruz
- Succeeded by: Pedro Pierluisi

Solicitor General of Puerto Rico
- In office 1989–1991

Personal details
- Born: April 24, 1956 (age 69) San Juan, Puerto Rico,
- Spouse: Lizette Maldonado
- Children: Maria Victoria Perez; Andrea Perez
- Education: Fairfield University, B.A. University of Puerto Rico, J.D. Harvard University, LLM
- Occupation: Attorney

Jorge E. Pérez-Díaz ( April 24, 1956 in San Juan, Puerto Rico) served as Secretary of Justice of Puerto Rico from 1991 to 1992. He was appointed by former Governor Rafael Hernández Colón. Prior to becoming the Secretary of Justice, Pérez-Díaz served as Prosecutor General of Puerto Rico from 1989 to 1991. He is currently Major League Baseball's Senior Vice President and Special Counsel, Litigation and International Affairs.

== Education ==
Pérez-Díaz received his bachelor's degree, magna cum laude, from Fairfield University in 1978 and received his Juris Doctor degree, magna cum laude from the University of Puerto Rico School of Law in 1981. He was Editor-in-Chief of the University of Puerto Rico Law Review. Pérez-Díaz received his master's of law from the Harvard Law School in 1983.

== Clerkships ==
After law school, Pérez-Díaz served as a judicial clerk for Chief Justice Jose Trias Monge of the Supreme Court of Puerto Rico and for Stephen Breyer, a Judge of the United States Court of Appeals for the First Circuit and future Associate Justice of the United States Supreme Court.

== Legal career ==
From 1985 to 1986, Pérez-Díaz was the Director of the Federal Litigation Division at United States Department of Justice for the Commonwealth of Puerto Rico. From 1986 to 1989, he was the Special Assistant to the Governor in Charge of Federal Affairs in the Office of Governor Rafael Hernández Colón. In 1989, Governor Hernández Colón appointed Pérez-Díaz as Solicitor General of the Puerto Rico and, in 1991, Governor Colón elevated Pérez-Díaz to Attorney General of the territory.

From 1993 to 2016, Pérez-Díaz was a partner at the law firm of Pietrantoni Méndez & Alvarez in San Juan, Puerto Rico. In November 2010, Commissioner Bud Selig appointed Perez-Diaz the Major League Baseball's Interim Head of Latin American Oversight where he was responsible for improving operations in Latin America.

In March 2016, Commissioner Rob Manfred appointed Pérez-Diaz as Major League Baseball's Senior Vice President and Special Counsel, Litigation and International Affairs. Pérez-Diaz liaises with the legal counsel of all 30 Major League Baseball clubs and manages various legal issues in the Dominican Republic, Mexico, Venezuela, Cuba, Puerto Rico, Haiti and throughout Latin America.

== Personal ==
Pérez-Díaz married Lizette Maldonado Taylor, a former aide to former Governor Rafael Hernandez Colon and former Governor Anibal Acevedo Vila, on December 30, 1989. He has two children, Maria Victoria, born December 12, 1991, and Andrea Isabel, born August 26, 1994.

Legal offices
Preceded by Héctor Rivera Cruz	Secretary of Justice of Puerto Rico; 1991–1992	Succeeded by Pedro Pierluisi
