= Ernesto Colón Yordán =

Puerto Rican physician

Ernesto Colón Yordán (1920–2003) was a Puerto Rican physician and public health administrator who served as the Secretary of Health of Puerto Rico beginning in 1969, under the administration of Governor Luis A. Ferré. He played a significant role in the development and regionalization of Puerto Rico’s healthcare system during the late 1960s and early 1970s.

== Early life and education ==
Colón Yordán was born in Ponce, Puerto Rico. He earned his medical degree from the University of Maryland School of Medicine, where he specialized in anesthesiology. During his student years, he joined Phi Sigma Alpha fraternity, becoming a member of the Alpha Chapter. After completing his studies, he held several key leadership roles within the Puerto Rican public health system.

== Medical career ==
In 1953, Colón Yordán was appointed Medical Director of the Ponce District Hospital. He later served as Medical Director of the Puerto Rico Medical Center (Centro Médico de Puerto Rico). He was also president of the Puerto Rico Medical Association and vice president of the Interamerican Medical Federation. He was founder, organizer and a member of the first board of directors of Triple-S Management Corporation. From 1953 until being named Secretary, he was Medical Director of Hospital Damas.

=== Secretary of Health ===
In December 1968, Governor-elect Luis A. Ferré announced Colón Yordán's appointment as Secretary of Health, a position he formally assumed in 1969. During his tenure, he led efforts to implement a comprehensive regionalization of public health services across Puerto Rico. Under his leadership, significant expansions occurred, including the establishment of major medical centers in Ponce and Mayagüez.

Colón Yordán also recruited a new generation of young physicians and administrators, strengthening the institutional leadership within the Department of Health.

== Legacy ==
Dr. Ernesto Colón Yordán is remembered for his contributions to Puerto Rico’s public health infrastructure and for advancing equitable access to healthcare through regionalization and professional development within the Department of Health.
