= Secretary of Justice of Puerto Rico =

Government of Puerto Rico

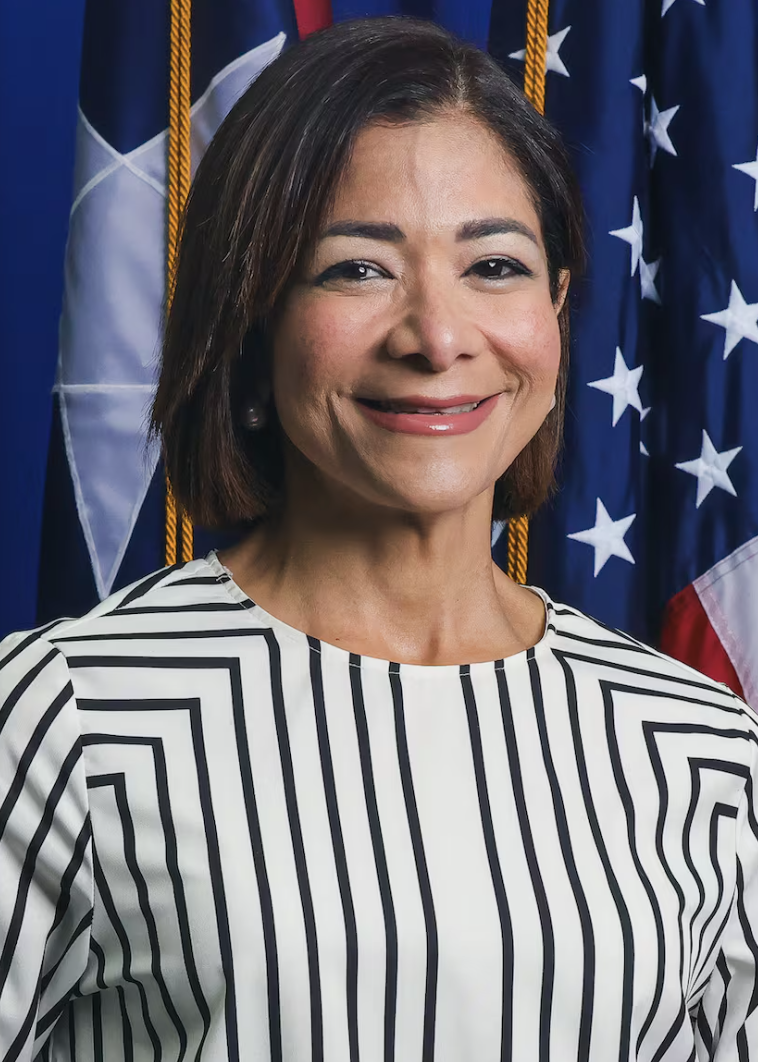
- Incumbent; Lourdes Gómez Torres since May 27, 2025; Acting: May 27, 2025 – June 9, 2025
- Department of Justice
- Nominator: Governor
- Appointer: Governor with advice and consent from the Senate
- Term length: 4 years
- Inaugural holder: Henry W. Hoyt
- Formation: Established by Article IV of the Constitution of Puerto Rico
- Succession: Second
- Website: www.justicia.pr.gov

The secretary of justice of Puerto Rico (Spanish: secretario de justicia de Puerto Rico) (known as the attorney general of Puerto Rico (Spanish: Procurador general de Puerto Rico) prior to the Constitution of Puerto Rico in 1952) is the chief legal officer and the attorney general of the government of Puerto Rico. The secretary of justice is second in line of succession to the governorship of Puerto Rico.

== Attorneys general ==
The attorney general was appointed by the president of the United States and confirmed by the U.S. Senate.

- 1908–1910: Henry W. Hoyt
- 1910–1912: Foster H. Brown
- 1912–1914: Walcott H. Pitkin
- 1914–1919: Howard L. Kern
- 1919–1923: Salvador Mestre
- 1923–1925: Herbert P. Coats
- 1925–1928: George C. Butte
- 1928–1932: James R. Beverley
- 1932–1933: Charles E. Winter
- 1933–1935: Benjamin Jason Horton
- 1935–1939: Benigno Fernández García
- 1940–1942: George A. Malcolm
- 1943–1944: Manuel Rodríguez Ramos - Interim
- 1944: Jesús A. González - Interim
- 1945: Luis Negrón Fernández - Interim
- 1945–1946: Enrique Campos del Toro
- 1947–1948: Luis Negrón Fernández
- 1949–1951: Vicente Geigel Polanco
- 1951–1952: Víctor Gutiérrez Franqui

== Secretaries ==
Under the Constitution of Puerto Rico, adopted in 1952, the office of Attorney General was renamed to Secretary of Justice. The secretary is appointed by the Governor of Puerto Rico and confirmed by the Senate of Puerto Rico.

- 1952–1953: Víctor Gutiérrez Franqui
- 1953–1957: José Trías Monge
- 1957–1958: Juan B. Fernandez-Badillo
- 1959–1965: Hiram Rafael Cancio
- 1965–1967: Rafael Hernández Colón
- 1967–1968: José C. Aponte García
- 1969–1970: Santiago C. Soler Favale
- 1970–1971: Blás C. Herrero Marrero
- 1972: Wallace González Oliver
- 1973–1975: Francisco De Jesús-Schuck
- 1975–1976: Carlos R. Rios-Gautier
- 1977–1981: Miguel Giménez Muñoz
- 1981–1983: Hector Reichard De Cardona
- 1983–Sept.1983: Gerardo Carlo Altieri
- Sept.–Dec. 1983:Carmen Rita Velez Borras
- 1984–1991: Héctor Rivera Cruz
- 1991–1992: Jorge E. Pérez-Díaz
- 1993–1997: Pedro Pierluisi
- 1997–2000: José Fuentes Agostini
- January 2, 2001 – July 31, 2004: Anabelle Rodríguez
- August 11, 2004 – December 31, 2004: William Vazquez Irizarry
- January 2, 2005 – December 31, 2008: Roberto Sánchez Ramos
- January 2, 2009 – October 24, 2010: Antonio Sagardía
- October 24, 2010 – December 31, 2012: Guillermo Somoza
- January 2, 2013 – December 28, 2013: Luis Sánchez Betances
- January 23, 2014 – January 2, 2017: César Miranda
- January 2, 2017 – August 2, 2019: Wanda Vázquez Garced
- August 2, 2019 – July 16, 2020: Dennise Longo Quiñones
- July 16, 2020 – January 2, 2021 (Acting): Inés Del C. Carrau Martínez
- January 2, 2021 – January 1, 2025 (Acting: January 2, 2021 – March 25, 2021): Domingo Emanuelli
- January 2, 2025 – May 8, 2025 (Acting): Janet Parra Mercado
- May 27, 2025 – present (Acting: May 27, 2025 – June 9, 2025): Lourdes Gómez
