= Dennise Longo Quiñones =

Puerto Rican lawyer and government official

Dennise Longo

Secretary of Justice of Puerto Rico
- In office August 18, 2019 – July 7, 2020
- Governor: Wanda Vázquez Garced
- Preceded by: Wanda Vázquez Garced
- Succeeded by: Inés Del C. Carrau Martínez (Acting)

Personal details
- Born: Dennise Noemí Longo Quiñones; San Juan, Puerto Rico
- Political party: New Progressive
- Relatives: Concepción Quiñones de Longo (mother)and Fernando Longo
- Education: Brown University (BA); George Washington University (JD)

Dennise Noemí Longo Quiñones is a Puerto Rican lawyer and government official serving as the Secretary of Justice of Puerto Rico. Longo Quiñones was previously a United States Attorney and assistant federal prosecutor. She was a special assistant to Secretary of Justice José Fuentes Agostini from 1998 to 2000 and the legal advisor of Governor Luis Fortuño from 2009 to 2012.

== Early life and education ==
Dennise Noemí Longo Quiñones was born in San Juan, Puerto Rico to Concepción Quiñones de Longo and raised in Bayamón. She completed grade school at the Colegio Santo Domingo and graduated from the Colegio Puertorriqueño de Niñas. Longo Quiñones earned a bachelor's degree in political science and Latin American studies at Brown University. She attended graduated school at the George Washington University Law School (GW Law) while working as a paralegal for Brown & Wood. Longo Quiñones also worked in the United States Department of Justice Civil Division and the office of the Federal public defender. She participated in the GW Law Immigration Clinic and interned for the United States House of Representatives. In 1993, Longo Quiñones completed a Juris Doctor at GW Law and was admitted to the practice of law in Maryland.

== Career ==
From 1993 to 1995, Longo Quiñones worked at the Circuit Court of Maryland for Baltimore City as a judicial officer and assistant prosecutor where she specialized in juvenile delinquency. In 1995, she was admitted to the Bar Association of Puerto Rico and she began working in private practice.

From November 1998 to October 2000, Longo Quiñones was a special assistant to the Secretary of Justice of Puerto Rico José Fuentes Agostini and Ángel Rotger Sabat where she handled civil rights lawsuits pertaining to the conditions in medical, juvenile, and criminal institutions. From late 2000 to 2008, she worked in corporate law in various law firms throughout Orlando, Florida and Puerto Rico.

Longo Quiñones was a legal advisor to Governor Luis Fortuño from January 2009 to June 2012. She chaired the Governor's ethics committee in the Governor's office. From 2012 to 2019, she was an assistant federal prosecutor and United States Attorney for the United States Department of Justice in the international narcotics division and the financial fraud corruption where she led investigations on drug trafficking and money laundering organizations.

In August 2019, Longo Quiñones was appointed as the Secretary of Justice of Puerto Rico by Governor Wanda Vázquez Garced. In October 2019, the Senate of Puerto Rico confirmed her appointment despite opposition from senate minority members in the Popular Democratic and Puerto Rican Independence parties.

Legal offices
Preceded by Wanda Vázquez Garced	Secretary of Justice of Puerto Rico; 2019–2020	Succeeded by Inés Del C. Carrau Martínez; Acting
