= University of Puerto Rico, Medical Sciences Campus =

Medical school in San Juan, Puerto Rico

- Universidad de Puerto Rico, Recinto de Ciencias Médicas
- Type: Public medical school
- Established: 1966; 60 years ago
- Chancellor: Dr. Myrna Quiñones Feliciano
- President: Zayira Jordán Conde
- Faculty: 623
- Students: 2,766
- Undergraduates: 400
- Postgraduates: 2,366
- Location: PO Box 365067, San Juan, Puerto Rico 00936-5067
- Campus: Urban
- Website: rcm1.rcm.upr.edu

The University of Puerto Rico, Medical Sciences Campus — Universidad de Puerto Rico, Recinto de Ciencias Médicas (UPR-RCM) in Spanish— is a public health sciences-oriented university in San Juan, Puerto Rico. It is part of the University of Puerto Rico System and is located on the grounds of the Puerto Rico Medical Center.

== History ==
In 1966 the University of Puerto Rico organized the Medical Sciences Campus. Adán Nigaglioni Loyola was its first Chancellor in 1967. In 1972 the building was constructed in the grounds of the Rio Piedras Medical Center, which now blanket the UPR School of Medicine, Specialized schools only in Puerto Rico and Pharmacy (1913), Dentistry (1957), Graduate School of Public Health (1970), College of Health Related Professions (1976) and the School of Nursing (1995). The enclosure also comprises four Deans who support: Dean of Administration, Student Affairs, Academic Affairs and Research. They work together more than 2,000 employees (623 teachers and nonteaching 1,454) to approximately 2,766 full-time students.

== Academics ==
The UPR-Medical Sciences Campus promotes education integrated with practice and experimentation, and offers multiple programs of study in the health field, including associate degrees, bachelor's degrees, post-baccalaureate certificates, master's, doctorate, residencies, post-doctoral degrees in:

- Medicine
- Dentistry
- Pharmacy
- Public Health
- Biosocial Science
- Environmental Health
- Nursing
- Physical and Occupational Therapy
- Speech-Language Pathology
- Nutrition
- Demography

The School of Health Professions, offers 16 academic programs in specific disciplines such as Physical Therapy, Occupational Therapy, Audiology, Clinical Laboratory Sciences, Speech Pathology, Health Information Administration and others which prepare students in specific disciplines within the field of health to exercise positions that complement care. Most are only open to students in their second year or beyond.

The university is accredited by the Middle States Commission on Higher Education and most programs are accredited by the appropriate discipline-specific accreditor. In 2021, the neurosurgery program lost its accreditation by June 2022 there will be no neurosurgery program on the island. The university must wait until 2024 to once again request accreditation for the program. In March 2022 the Middle States Commission warned the campus is at risk of losing accreditation.

=== Professional schools ===
- UPR School of Medicine
- UPR School of Pharmacy
- UPR School of Public Health
- UPR School of Dental Medicine
- UPR Nursing School
- UPR School of Health Professions

== Research ==
The Medical Sciences Campus is distinguished by outstanding academia in the field of the health professions. It is a multidisciplinary center, assuming the leadership in teaching and research on prevalent health conditions in Puerto Rico. The campus is a specialized center in basic, applied and clinical research in the biomedical sciences. It also includes the following research centers: the Puerto Rico Clinical and Translational Research Consortium, the Behavioral Research Institute, the Women's and Health Research Center, the Research Center in Minority Institutions, the Maternal Infant Study Center, the Center for Clinical Research and Health Promotion, the UPR Cancer Center and the AIDS Clinical Trials Units. The Institute of Neurobiology is located in Old San Juan. The Caribbean Primate Center is located in Sabana Seca and also has a primate colony in an offshore island.

== Facilities ==
=== Conrado F. Asenjo Library ===
The Conrado F. Asenjo Library of the Medical Sciences Campus of the University of Puerto Rico is the main health sciences information resource on the Island and is considered to have the most complete collection of its kind in the Caribbean. Collection and services support academic programs in Medicine, Public Health, Dental Medicine, Nursing, Pharmacy and Health Professions. It is located in Unit C of the Guillermo Arbona Irizarry Building (Main Building) of the Campus, adjacent to the University Hospital and to the Trauma Emergency Services. It has a total of 38,044 square feet (3,534.4 m^{2}), spread over five floors. Seating capacity is 410. The Library is open 55 hours per week. Is a public university library and a resource library under the National Network of Libraries of Medicine.

== Alumni Association ==
- Association of the University of Puerto Rico Alumni and Friends Abroad (UPRAA)

== See also ==
- School of Tropical Medicine
