= Antonio Sagardía =

Puerto Rican politician

Secretary of Justice of Puerto Rico
- In office January 2, 2009 – December 23, 2009
- Governor: Luis Fortuño
- Preceded by: Roberto Sánchez Ramos
- Succeeded by: Guillermo Somoza

Personal details
- Born: August 11, 1957 (age 69)
- Party: New Progressive
- Education: University of Puerto Rico

Antonio Miguel Sagardía-De Jesús (born August 11, 1957) is a Puerto Rican lawyer who served as Secretary of Justice of Puerto Rico. He was appointed by Governor Luis Fortuño and sworn in by Secretary of State Kenneth McClintock on January 2, 2009. He resigned on December 23, 2009.

== Controversies ==
In May 2009, Mr. Sagardía was involved in a confrontation with representative Luis Vega Ramos during a budget hearing. Vega Ramos questioned contracts the Puerto Rico Department of Justice had awarded to Sagardia's former partner Víctor A. Ramos. It had previously surfaced that Sagardia, acting as Attorney General, had granted the release from prison of a convicted murderer represented by his former partner. During the confrontation Mr. Sagardia was reported to have called Vega Ramos a scoundrel, a chump lawyer and an intellectual dwarf.

Upon resigning his post as Secretary of Justice of Puerto Rico, Sagardía then represented murder suspect Ana Cacho in the high-profile case of the Murder of Lorenzo González Cacho, a move that was seen as unethical by many.

== Duties and Powers ==
As the top law enforcement official in Puerto Rico, Sagardía headed a unified prosecutorial system in which all district attorneys are appointed by the Governor and served under Attorney General Sagardía.

On its own discretion and authority, the Office of the Attorney General may investigate constitutional and politically sensitive issues.

Prior to taking office, Sagardía embarked on the task of reviewing the Justice Department's conduct, during several politically sensitive investigations carried out under his predecessor.

== Line of Succession ==
In the event that the Governor of Puerto Rico is traveling away from Puerto Rico, the Attorney General is second in the line of succession, after the Secretary of State. On January 18, 2009, Attorney General Sagardía served as the first Acting Governor of Puerto Rico during the 2009–2013 term, when then Governor of Puerto Rico Luis Fortuño and 22nd Secretary of State of Puerto Rico Kenneth McClintock both attended the inaugural ceremonies of then American President-elect Barack Obama.

== Personal Background ==
Sagardía was born in 1957. He is a former district attorney and attorney in private practice, both before and after serving as the Puerto Rican Attorney General.

He is a member of the Governor's New Progressive Party of Puerto Rico, and a graduate of the University of Puerto Rico.

Legal offices
Preceded by Roberto Sánchez Ramos	Secretary of Justice of Puerto Rico; 2009–2010	Succeeded by Guillermo Somoza
