= Luis Sánchez Betances =

Puerto Rican politician (born 1947)

Luis Sanchez Betances appears under records of the U.S Library of Congress.

Luis Sánchez Betances (born June 21, 1947, in the Dominican Republic) is an attorney and partner at Sánchez-Betances, Sifre & Muñoz-Noya, PSC. Mr. Sánchez-Betances is a Laude graduate of the University of Puerto Rico School of Law, class of 1972, having also studied part of his career at the New York University School of Law. He earned his bachelor's degree from the College of Business Administration of the University of Puerto Rico, Río Piedras Campus in 1969. Sánchez served as the Secretary of Justice for the 16th Cabinet of Puerto Rico from January to December 2013, before resigning.

== Early life ==
Luis was born on June 21, 1947, in Santo Domingo, Dominican Republic.
