= Wanda Vázquez Garced =

Governor of Puerto Rico from 2019 to 2021

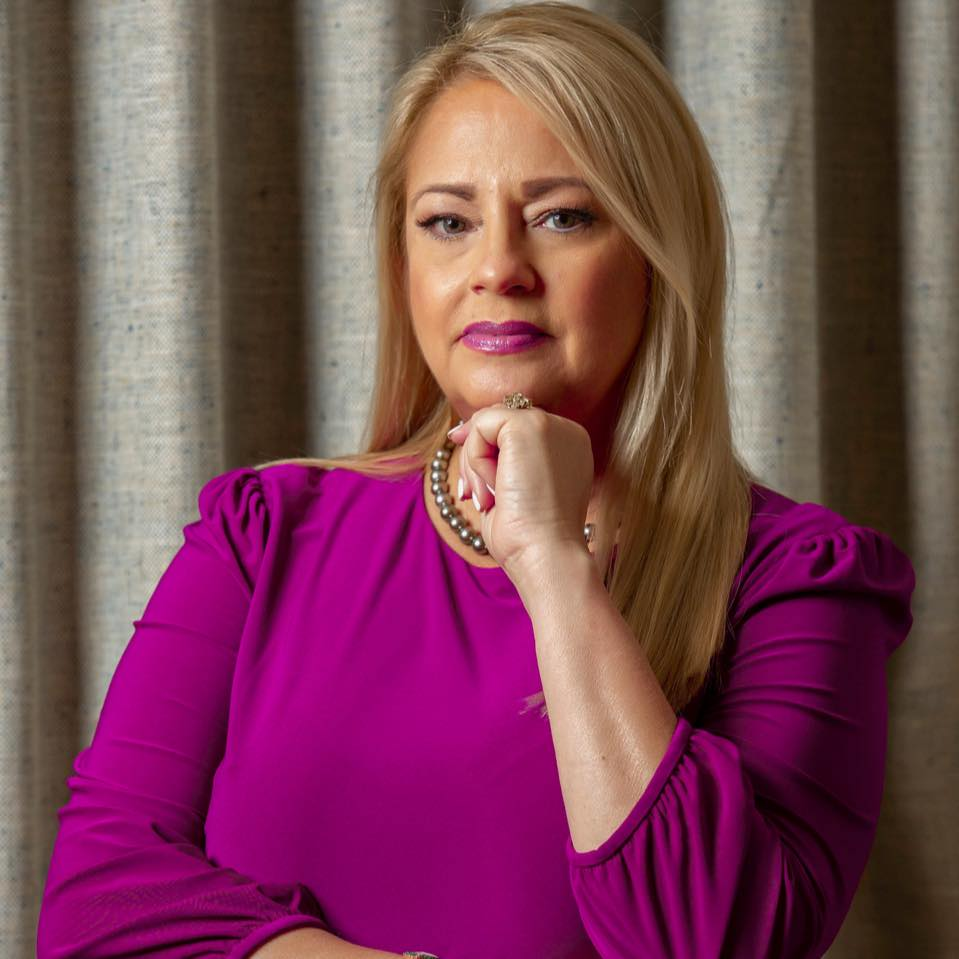
- Vázquez in 2022

Governor of Puerto Rico
- In office August 7, 2019 – January 2, 2021
- Preceded by: Ricardo Rosselló; Pedro Pierluisi (de facto) (Note: Pierluisi's swearing in was deemed unconstitutional and he was removed from office on August 7, 2019. Vázquez Garced was subsequently sworn in as governor.)
- Succeeded by: Pedro Pierluisi

19th Secretary of Justice of Puerto Rico
- In office January 2, 2017 – August 7, 2019
- Governor: Ricardo Rosselló; Pedro Pierluisi (de facto)
- Preceded by: César Miranda
- Succeeded by: Dennise Longo Quiñones

Personal details
- Born: Wanda Emilia Vázquez Garced; July 9, 1960 (age 66) San Juan, Puerto Rico
- Party: New Progressive
- Other political affiliations: Democratic (before 2019); Republican (2019–present)
- Spouse: Jorge Díaz Reverón
- Children: 2
- Education: University of Puerto Rico, Río Piedras (BA); Interamerican University of Puerto Rico (JD)

Wanda Emilia Vázquez Garced (born July 9, 1960) is a Puerto Rican politician and attorney who served as governor of Puerto Rico from 2019 to 2021. Vázquez Garced previously served as the 19th Secretary of Justice from 2017 to 2019. A member of the New Progressive Party (PNP) and Republican Party of Puerto Rico, she is the second female governor to serve, after Sila María Calderón.

Vázquez Garced was constitutionally appointed to the governorship following the resignation of Ricardo Roselló, and the judicial annulation of the assumption of the office by Pedro Pierluisi after the Telegramgate Scandal. She failed to secure the PNP gubernatorial nomination for the 2020 general elections, losing to Pedro Pierluisi, who was elected governor.

The ascension to the governorship by Vázquez Garced was at the epicenter of a landmark decision by the Supreme Court of Puerto Rico in the case of Senado de Puerto Rico v. Hon. Pedro R. Pierluisi. The highest court in Puerto Rico derogated a clause added by Puerto Rico Law #7 of 2005 (Law No. 7-2005) to the Constitution of Puerto Rico. This annulled Pedro Pierluisi's assumption of the office, and reinforced the 1952 Constitution's provisions for succession of government.

On August 4, 2022, Vázquez Garced was arrested by the FBI, on charges of corruption, over a bribery case connected to her 2020 gubernatorial campaign; she had allegedly offered to appoint a financial regulator of a banker's choosing in exchange for campaign donations. On August 27, 2025, Vázquez Garced pleaded guilty to a campaign finance violation, becoming the first former Governor of Puerto Rico in history to plead guilty to a crime. She was expected to be sentenced on October 15, 2025. In 2026, alongside co-conspirators Vázquez Garced was pardoned by President Donald Trump after a relative of the conspirators had made a $2.5 million donation to a political action committee devoted to Trump.

== Early life and education ==
Vázquez was born in Santurce, San Juan and raised in Guaynabo. Her parents worked in a factory, her father as a security guard. Her mother died at the age of 53. Her father has been remarried for twenty years. She has a younger brother and an older sister. She began her primary studies at the Ramón Marín and Margarita Janer schools in Guaynabo, Puerto Rico. Vázquez became interested in law at an early age. She said in an interview that she used to watch TV shows like Hawaii Five-O with her father, which led her to realize she wanted to follow a career along that line. Vázquez studied at the University of Puerto Rico, where she completed her bachelor's degree. After that, she completed her Juris doctor (J.D.) at the Interamerican University of Puerto Rico School of Law.

== Career ==
During the 1980s, Vázquez worked for the Puerto Rico Department of Housing. She then worked as a district attorney for the Puerto Rico Department of Justice for 20 years. Vázquez specialized in cases of domestic and gender violence. She also worked in the Criminal Division for the Bayamón Prosecutor's office.

In 2010, Vázquez was appointed to replace Ivonne Feliciano as the head of the Office for Women's Rights of the island. On November 30, 2016, Governor-elect Ricardo Rosselló nominated her for the position of Secretary of Justice of Puerto Rico. She was confirmed and sworn in on January 18, 2017.

=== Governor of Puerto Rico ===
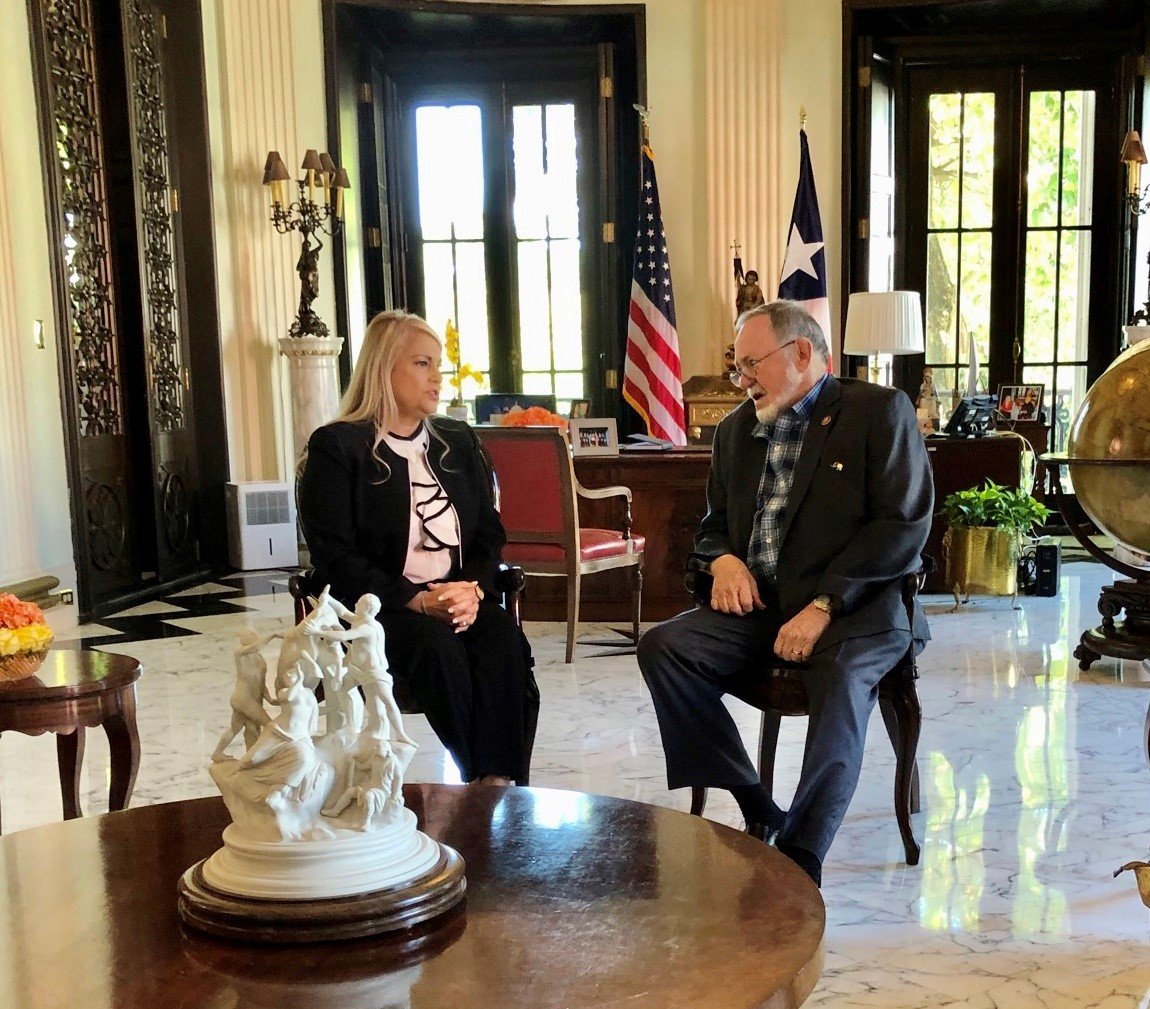
Wanda Vázquez Garced meeting with Representative Don Young (R-AK) in November 2019.

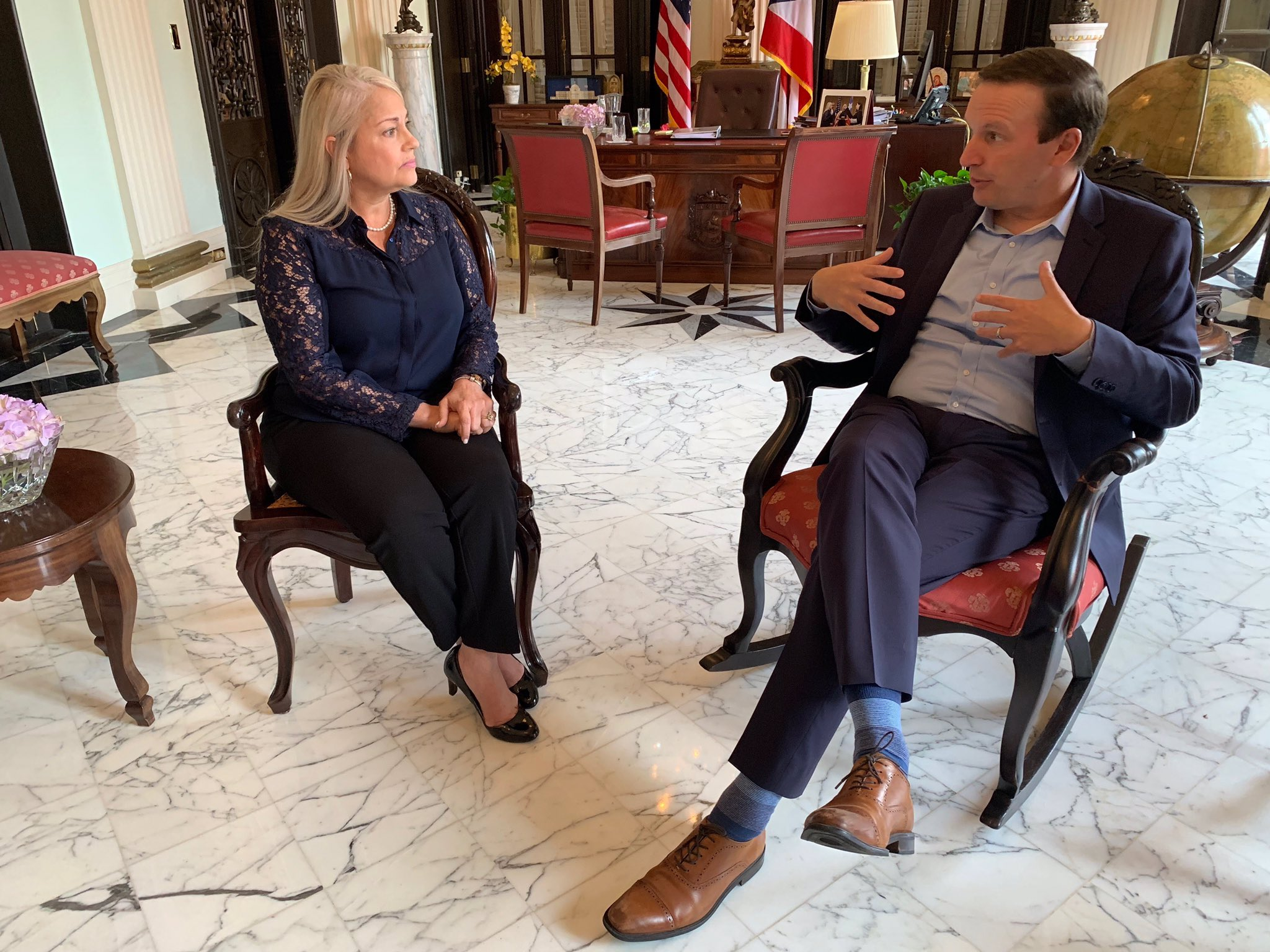
Wanda Vázquez during her meeting with Senator Chris Murphy (D-CT).

Vázquez was initially expected to become Governor of Puerto Rico after the resignation of Ricardo Rosselló on August 2, 2019. She was met with opposition, with critics calling for her resignation due to allegations of corruption and inability to deal with domestic violence on the island. Protests against her proposed succession as governor took place, the most notable of these being the Somos Más march (Spanish for "We Are More") a title alluding to a popular chant during the protests calling for Rosselló's resignation. The hashtag #WandaRenuncia (Spanish for "Wanda Resign") began trending on Twitter soon after Rosselló announced his intention to resign. Vázquez said on Twitter that she had no interest in becoming governor, and that she would take the position only if she were constitutionally required to.

On July 31, Rosselló announced that he was appointing former Resident Commissioner Pedro Pierluisi to the vacant position of the Secretary of State, as the secretary of state superseded the secretary of justice in the order of succession. On August 1, however, the Puerto Rican Senate blocked Pierluisi from being confirmed as secretary of state in time for Rosselló's resignation on August 2, meaning that he only served in the office on acting basis. Upon Rosselló's resignation, Pierluisi succeeded to the governorship in a de facto manner instead of Vázquez. However, as he had not been confirmed by the Senate, the validity of his governorship was called into question.

On August 7, 2019, the Supreme Court of Puerto Rico ruled that Pierluisi was sworn in on unconstitutional grounds and removed him from office, effective at 5 p.m. AST. At that time, Vázquez became the second female governor of Puerto Rico.

Vázquez stated she wanted to recover Hurricane Maria relief funds, and review all government contracts to ensure they are managed correctly, free of corruption. She said she wanted to work with President Donald Trump to help the island of Puerto Rico and its 3.2 million American citizens. She stated all contracts signed by Ricardo Rosselló would be reviewed. At the same time, HUD (Housing and Urban Development) stated that hurricane funds would be delayed to Puerto Rico due to corruption, and incapacity to absorb funds for projects, respectively.

In the aftermath of 2019–20 Puerto Rico earthquakes residents discovered unused aid from Hurricane Maria in a warehouse in Ponce and as a result Vázquez fired her emergency management director. On July 21, 2020, the Puerto Rico Office of the Special Independent Prosecutor's Panel opened a case against Vázquez for alleged violation of the Commonwealth's ethics law, as well as federal regulations, related to her handling of aid to the earthquake victims. She responded by accusing the judge in charge of the investigation of being a supporter of her primary elections challenger Pedro Pierluisi. Vázquez was ordered by the panel to present evidence in the form of photos which she claimed demonstrated that political motives were behind the investigation, but she failed to provide said evidence.

On March 12, 2020, Vázquez declared a state of emergency for Puerto Rico and activated the Puerto Rican National Guard as a result of the COVID-19 pandemic in Puerto Rico.

On October 6, 2020, Vásquez endorsed Donald Trump for the 2020 United States presidential election.

== 2020 primaries ==
On August 16, 2020, Vázquez lost the gubernatorial primary race to Pedro Pierluisi. With 75.6% of voting stations reporting, Pierluisi had won about 57.9% of the votes to Vazquez's 42.1%, clinching the nomination for New Progressive Party. Pierluisi claimed victory after Vázquez recognized his lead and said she respected the will of voters.

== Personal life ==
Vázquez is married to Jorge Díaz Reverón, a judge in Caguas, Puerto Rico. She has two daughters, Stephanie and Beatriz Díaz Vázquez.

== See also ==
- List of female governors in the United States
- List of party switchers in the United States
- List of people granted executive clemency in the second Trump presidency
- Telegramgate

== Notes ==
Legal offices
Preceded by César Miranda	Secretary of Justice of Puerto Rico; 2017–2019	Succeeded by Dennise Longo Quiñones
Political offices
Preceded by Pedro Pierluisi; De facto	Governor of Puerto Rico; 2019–2021	Succeeded by Pedro Pierluisi
