= University of Puerto Rico School of Medicine =

Medical school of the University of Puerto Rico

- Type: Public
- Established: 1912 (Institute of Tropical Medicine)
- Dean: Deborah Silva MD
- Location: San Juan, Puerto Rico
- Website: www.md.rcm.upr.edu

The University of Puerto Rico, Medical Sciences Campus, School of Medicine is located in the University of Puerto Rico, Medical Sciences Campus in San Juan, Puerto Rico. It's the only medical school in the University of Puerto Rico System. It is accredited by the Liaison Committee on Medical Education (LCME). Its students are predominantly Puerto Rican residents. However, anyone is allowed to apply to this university. It is also considered the top bilingual medical school in the world due to its requirement for each admitted student to master both English and Spanish.

== History ==
=== Institute of Tropical Medicine ===
In the nineteenth century, major health problems affected the Puerto Rican population. Anemia, malnutrition and parasitism were some of the most common conditions in children and adults. With the arrival of U.S. troops in 1898, the need for effective health plans to serve the population became a priority. With the change of sovereignty, anemia commissions were established in Puerto Rico. Thus began the development of what would become the Institute of Tropical Medicine, which was formalized in 1912.

=== School of Tropical Medicine ===
A consolidation of the former Institute of Tropical Medicine and other entities led in 1926 to the formation of the School of Tropical Medicine. Funds from Columbia University were used for the training of different health professionals in the island. At the same time, the school's professors conducted studies in collaboration with Columbia University physicians on tropical diseases hitherto of unknown etiology, or of high prevalence morbidity and mortality in Puerto Rico. In 1946 following the end of World War II, Columbia University canceled the money sent to the Medical School, which led to its closure. The legislature authorized a School of Medicine at the University of Puerto Rico, into which the School of Tropical Medicine was integrated.

=== UPR School of Medicine ===
The need for a State Medical School led in 1950 to the creation of the University of Puerto Rico School of Medicine as part of the University of Puerto Rico System, thanks to efforts made by the lawyer and first president of the university, Jaime Benitez. It began with an enrollment of 52 students. The school received its accreditation on 20 April 1954. In 1960, the university established a graduate program, unique in Puerto Rico, along with other medical services and research. Distinguished professors from European countries and Latin America visited the School for academics, research and consultation. Adán Nigaglioni Loyola was dean from 1963 to 1967.

== Academics ==
=== MD program ===
The curriculum of the program leading to the Doctor of Medicine degree is designed following the trends of modern medical education and takes into consideration the health needs of the community. It is divided into two major components: two years of required biomedical sciences and two years of clinical clerkships. The School of Medicine MD Program is fully accredited by the Liaison Committee on Medical Education.

=== Graduate programs ===
Programs leading to: Master of Science (M.S.) and Doctor of Philosophy (Ph.D.) in:

Anatomy, biochemistry, pharmacology and toxicology, physiology, microbiology and medical zoology biology through an intercampus (UPR-Medical Sciences and Rio Piedras) program.

Departments:

- Anatomy & Neurobiology
- Biochemistry
- Microbiology and Medical Zoology
- Pharmacology and Toxicology
- Physiology

=== Residency training programs ===
ACGME accredited specialty programs:

Anesthesiology, dermatology, diagnostic radiology, emergency medicine, family medicine, internal medicine, neurology, neurosurgery, obstetrics-gynecology, ophthalmology, orthopedic surgery, otolaryngology, pathology, pediatrics, physical medicine and rehabilitation, psychiatry, surgery and urology.

ACGME accredited sub-specialty programs:

Cardiovascular disease, child and adolescent psychiatry, endocrinology, family practice–geriatrics, gastroenterology, geriatric medicine, hematology/oncology, infectious diseases, neonatology, nephrology, neuromuscular medicine, nuclear medicine, pediatric critical care medicine, pediatric hematology/oncology, pediatric neurology, pulmonology and rheumatology.
