= AGH =

AGH or Agh may refer to:

== Places ==
=== Villages in Iran ===
- Agh Bolagh, various
- Agh Gol
- Āgh Kand
- Agh Qal'eh, various

=== Other places ===
- AgeHa, nightclub in Tokyo, Japan
- AGH University of Krakow, university in Krakow, Poland
- Alachua General Hospital, Gainesville, Florida, US hospital renamed to Shands AGH
- Allegheny General Hospital, Pittsburgh, Pennsylvania, US
- Ängelholm-Helsingborg Airport in Skåne County, Sweden (IATA airport code AGH)
- Art Gallery of Hamilton, Ontario, Canada
- Australian General Hospital, various Australian Army medical units in World War I and World War II (no list yet)

== Other uses ==
- A.G.H. Hansen
- Ágh, a surname
- Agh Shani, a white table grape
- Agh (trigraph), in orthography
- Ngelima language, ISO-639-3 code

== See also ==
- AGHS (disambiguation)
- AG (disambiguation)
