= Highmark =

American nonprofit healthcare company

Highmark Inc.

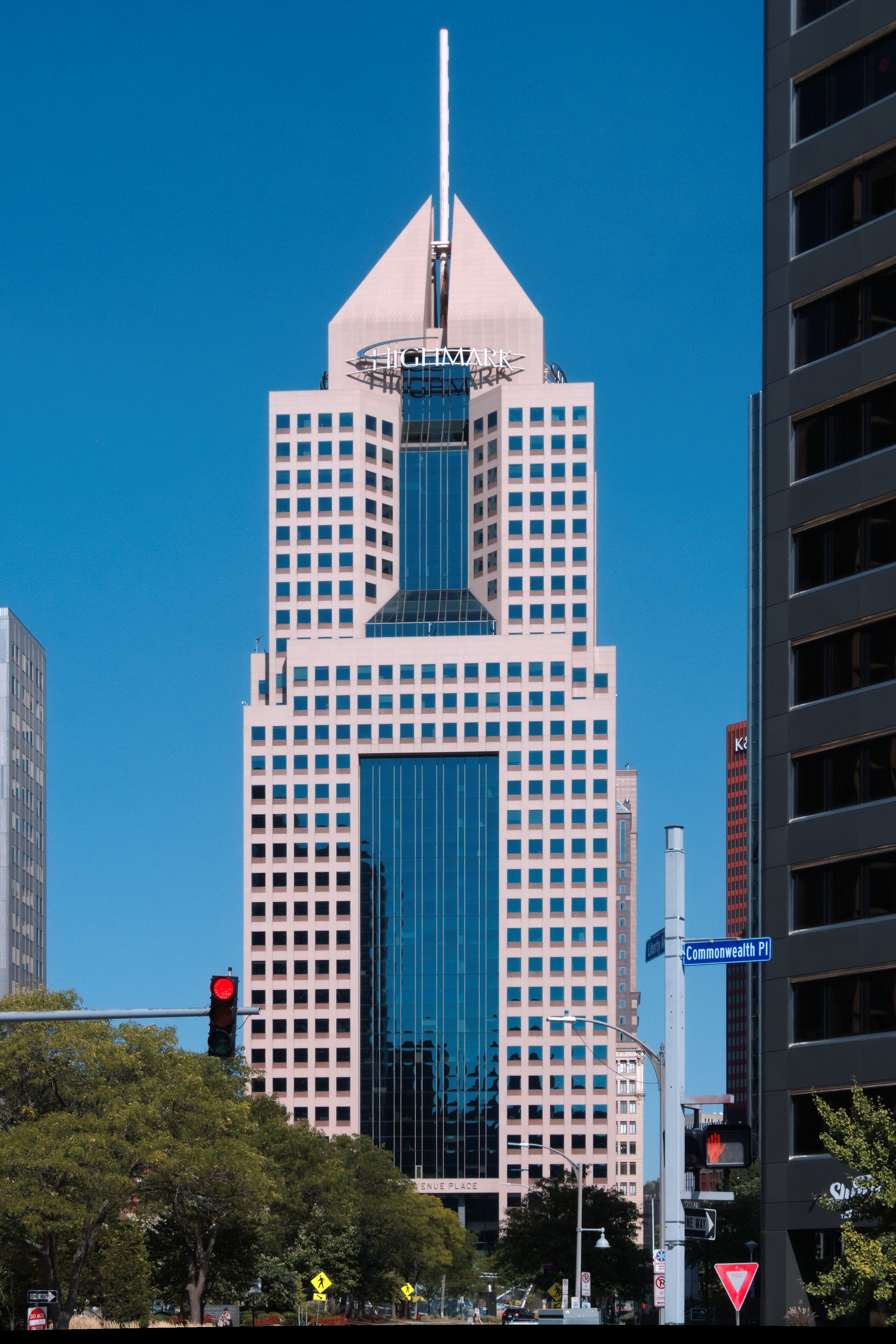
- Highmark's headquarters at Fifth Avenue Place, Pittsburgh
- Trade name: Highmark
- Type: 501(c)(3)Non-profit
- Industry: Healthcare, Insurance
- Founded: June 22, 1977
- Headquarters: Fifth Avenue Place; Pittsburgh, Pennsylvania
- Key people: Deborah L. Rice-Johnson, President
- Products: Health insurance
- Revenue: ▲$18.2 billion USD (2016)
- Number of employees: 40,000+ (2017)
- Website: www.highmark.com

Highmark Inc is an American nonprofit healthcare company and integrated delivery network based in Pittsburgh. It is a large individual health insurer in the United States, which operates several nonprofit and for-profit subsidiaries.

== Locality ==
It is a health insurer in Pennsylvania, and through a purchase in 1996, an insurer in West Virginia and also later Delaware. As Highmark Blue Cross Blue Shield, it is primarily available in 29 counties of western Pennsylvania. As Highmark Blue Shield, it is available in 21 counties in Central Pennsylvania and the Lehigh Valley. It also has a presence in the border areas of eastern Ohio, and all of West Virginia through its subsidiary, Highmark Blue Cross Blue Shield West Virginia.

Highmark acquired Blue Cross of Northeastern Pennsylvania, BCNEPA, in June 2015.

== Company history ==
Highmark was created in 1977 and in the 1990s by the consolidation of two Pennsylvania licensees of the Blue Cross and Blue Shield Association — Pennsylvania Blue Shield (now Highmark Blue Shield) based in suburban Harrisburg, and Blue Cross of Western Pennsylvania based in downtown Pittsburgh (now Highmark Blue Cross Blue Shield). The consolidated group is available in 62 of the state's 67 counties. In West Virginia, the company operates as Highmark Blue Cross Blue Shield West Virginia, and in Delaware, it operates as Highmark Blue Cross Blue Shield Delaware. The new company has based its head office in downtown Pittsburgh.

On March 28, 2007, Highmark announced it intended to consolidate with Independence Blue Cross of Philadelphia. The combination of the 2 insurers would have created a new company with over 18,000 employees, dual-headquarters in both Pittsburgh and Philadelphia and an economic impact of over $4 billion throughout the Commonwealth of Pennsylvania. On January 22, 2009, Highmark and Independence Blue Cross withdrew their applications to consolidate due to the unacceptability of conditions that the Pennsylvania Insurance Department was going to place upon the merger: to give up either of their well-known "Blue Cross" or "Blue Shield" trademarks.

In 2011 the company announced it would buy the financially troubled West Penn Allegheny Health System (WPAHS) for about $500 million, expanding from insurance into owning hospitals. This began a period of conflict between Highmark and the University of Pittsburgh Medical Center (UPMC), which had expanded from hospitals into insurance, and caused difficulties for patients to access care at the conflicting institutions. The conflict included a lawsuit by Highmark against UPMC alleging that UPMC over-billed it by $300 million for cancer drugs, arbitrators ordered Highmark to pay $188 million.

In 2014, a gay couple criticized Highmark for not providing family coverage to same-sex couples under the Affordable Care Act. Highmark later reversed their policy.

In January 2020, the company earned distinction as "Best Place to Work for LGBTQ Equality" from the Human Rights Campaign Foundation, receiving a perfect score of 100 points in the national Corporate Equality Index.

In 2021, Highmark acquired HealthNow, which operated BlueCross BlueShield in Western New York and Northeastern New York.

On March 29, 2021, the Buffalo Bills of the National Football League announced that their stadium's new name would be Highmark Stadium after reaching a 10-year agreement with Highmark Blue Cross Blue Shield of Western New York. It was later announced in June 2023 that this naming agreement would extend into the construction and opening of the Bills' new stadium, which was called Highmark Stadium once it opened for the 2026 NFL season.

On March 17, 2026, Highmark announced an affiliation with Blue KC, bringing the total membership served to over 8 million.

== Organizational structure ==
Highmark Inc. has several wholly owned for-profit subsidiaries: United Concordia Companies, Inc., a dental insurer; Davis Vision, a provider of managed care vision benefits; and HM Insurance Group, a reinsurer providing stop-loss, limited benefit medical plans, worksite, life, disability, and administrative services. Highmark Inc. sold Visionworks of America to VSP Global in 2019.

- Highmark Health Plan aka Highmark Inc
  - Highmark Blue Cross Blue Shield (Western PA)
  - Highmark Blue Shield (Central PA)
  - Highmark Wholecare (PA Medicaid and D-SNP)
  - Highmark Blue Cross Blue Shield West Virginia
  - Highmark Blue Cross Blue Shield Delaware
  - Highmark Health Options (Delaware)
- Allegheny Health Network
  - Allegheny General Hospital
  - Allegheny Valley Hospital
  - Canonsburg Hospital
  - Forbes Regional Hospital
  - AHN Grove City
  - Jefferson Hospital
  - Saint Vincent Hospital
  - Western Pennsylvania Hospital
  - Westfield (NY) Memorial Hospital
  - Wexford Hospital
- Diversified Businesses
  - United Concordia (Dental)
  - HM Insurance Group (Health-related Insurance)
  - HM Health Solutions (IT Services)
  - The Highmark Foundation
  - HM Home and Community Services
