= Western Pennsylvania Hospital =

West Penn Hospital
- Allegheny Health Network
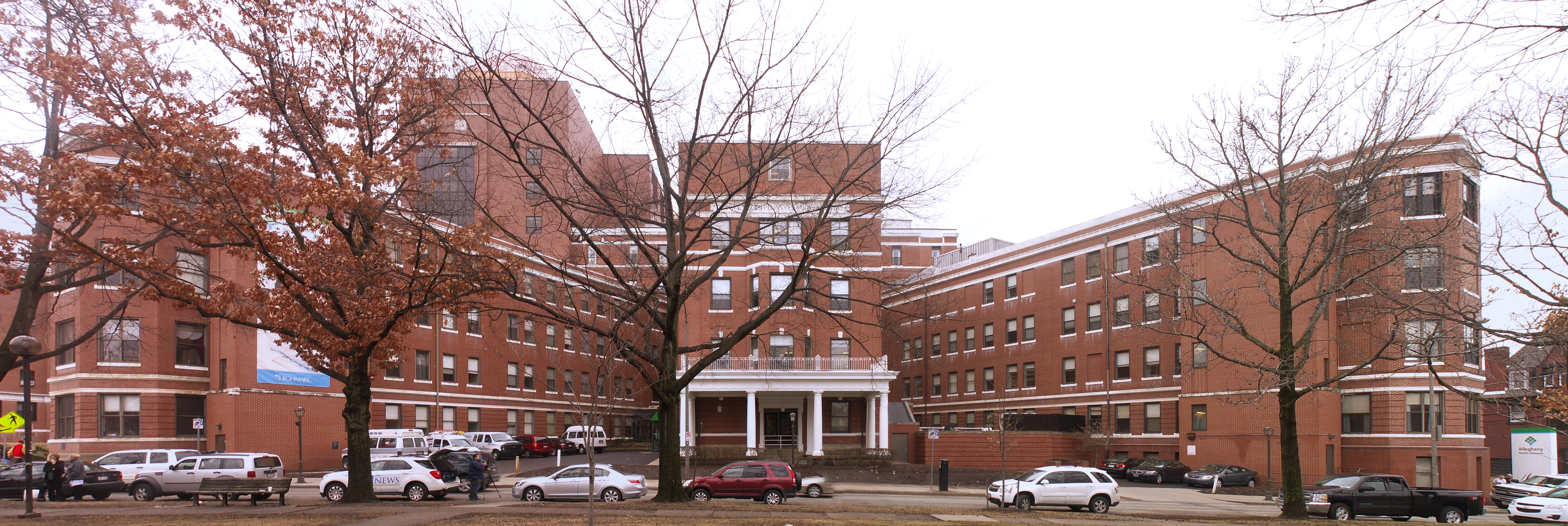

Geography
- Location: 4800 Friendship Avenue, Pittsburgh, Pennsylvania, United States
- Coordinates: 40°27′41″N 79°56′47″W

Organization
- Affiliated university: Duquesne University Temple University

Services
- Beds: 317

History
- Founded: 1848

Links
- Website: www.ahn.org
- Lists: Hospitals in Pennsylvania

Pittsburgh Landmark – PHLF
- Designated: 1973

The Western Pennsylvania Hospital, commonly referred to as West Penn Hospital, is located at 4800 Friendship Avenue in the Bloomfield neighborhood of Pittsburgh, Pennsylvania. The 317-bed hospital is part of the Allegheny Health Network. It serves as a clinical campus of the Drexel and LECOM schools of medicine, and also educates physicians through its large number of residency and fellowship programs. It is also the primary clinical setting of the West Penn Hospital School of Nursing.

== Early years ==
Founded on March 18, 1848, West Penn Hospital was Pittsburgh's first chartered public hospital. It was originally located in Pittsburgh's 12th ward, on a hillside overlooking the city's Strip District and adjacent to what is now Polish Hill. Today, that plot is home to a ball field and West Penn Park, after having been sold to the City of Pittsburgh.

After five years of design, construction and funding setbacks, the four-story, 120-patient hospital finally opened in spring 1853. During its early years, many of the patients were those injured by industrial accidents in Pittsburgh's mills and rail yards.

In 1862, West Penn opened the Dixmont Hospital (known officially as the "Department of the Insane in the Western Pennsylvania Hospital of Pittsburgh") on a steep bluff overlooking the Ohio River, about eight miles downriver from West Penn. Named in honor of mental health advocate Dorothea Dix, who successfully lobbied the state legislature for a grant to establish a separate facility, it was the first specialized mental health facility in Western Pennsylvania, and remained under West Penn's ownership until 1907.

During the American Civil War West Penn became a primary triage center serving Union forces. Because of its size, and because it was a public hospital not bound by religious affiliations, the United States government commandeered West Penn Hospital in 1862, making alterations to it and turning it into a military hospital for the next three years. (Civilians could still be treated at West Penn in emergency situations). By the end of the Civil War in 1865, some 3,000 soldiers had been treated at West Penn.

== Medical college and nursing school ==
The Western Pennsylvania Medical College, founded by West Penn surgeons and doctors, opened in October 1886 with a class of 57 students. It was the region's first medical school. The school's building was located at the east end of the hospital property and was connected to West Penn Hospital by an underground tunnel. Although the hospital declined to sponsor or fund the medical college, the school was allowed to make use of the hospital wards and dispensary for teaching purposes. The medical college eventually became The University of Pittsburgh School of Medicine.

The nursing school, then referred to as The Western Pennsylvania Hospital Training School for Nurses, opened in 1892 with fifteen students. Ten students completed the two-year curriculum, graduating on September 20, 1894.

== Expansion ==
By the turn of the 20th century, the original hospital was outdated, and the hospital's board agreed to build a new hospital in Pittsburgh's Bloomfield neighborhood, about a mile to the east. The cornerstone was laid in 1909, and on New Year's Day, 1912, the new West Penn Hospital opened, and 219 patients then in the hospital's care were moved to the new hospital. The six-story, X-shaped hospital was able to accommodate up to 500 patients, and featured modern operating rooms, laboratories, and X-ray machines.

In 1919, the hospital purchased another property on Friendship Avenue and by 1923 had opened a "Residence and Training School", now the West Penn Hospital School of Nursing. The building currently houses nurse educators and students as well as the Simulation Teaching, Academic Research (STAR) Center.

West Penn added a new obstetrical wing in 1950, and an intensive care unit in 1958. By the 1960s, another substantial expansion was underway, requiring a fund raising campaign to build a new entrance to the hospital along Millvale Avenue and a new ambulatory care center along Liberty Avenue (to be named Mellon Pavilion). Both Mellon Pavilion and the hospital's renowned Burn Care Unit opened in 1970, a heliport was added in 1971, and the East Tower, which specialized in diagnostic and critical care, opened in 1981. A nine-story patient care tower was added in 1995, topped by a copper dome visible for miles.

== Merger with Allegheny system ==
In 1999, West Penn Hospital acquired four hospitals through a merger with Allegheny Health Education and Research Foundation (AHERF), another Pittsburgh area health care provider. The transaction was related to AHERF's July 1998 bankruptcy and bond default (described as "the largest nonprofit health system bankruptcy in US history"). To avoid a bankruptcy liquidation of AHERF, the four Pittsburgh-area hospitals - Allegheny General, Forbes, Allegheny Valley and Canonsburg - merged with West Penn Hospital. In exchange, West Penn made a $25 million payment to AHERF's creditors, who agreed to release the AHERF hospitals from liability for all claims. The new system was known as the West Penn Allegheny Health System (WPAHS).

== Acquired by Highmark, Inc. ==
By 2010, parent company West Penn Allegheny Health System was experiencing severe financial difficulties, including cash shortages. In response, leadership announced plans to eliminate 1,500 jobs and close West Penn's emergency room. The emergency room closed on Jan. 1, 2011. Financial difficulties became so severe that management was preparing a budget that included the closure of the hospital by autumn 2011 unless a deal with an outside investor could be obtained, according to the Pittsburgh Post-Gazette.

In June 2011 West Penn Allegheny Health System and Highmark announced an agreement for a "capital partnership" in which Highmark would invest up to $475 million in the West Penn system, including $50 million to rescue the Bloomfield hospital "from what could have been imminent closure." The emergency room reopened in February 2012, and West Penn became a part of Highmark's Allegheny Health Network in 2013.

Today, West Penn Hospital is a 317-bed academic medical center. Its obstetrical program delivers 4,000 babies a year. The hospital's Level III neonatal intensive care unit, adult and pediatric certified burn trauma center, extended-hours oncology clinic and dozens of other services draw patients from across the state. In 2006 West Penn was the first hospital in southwestern Pennsylvania to receive the American Nurses Credentialing Center's prestigious Magnet Recognition Program award for nursing excellence. It is also the first in the region to be re-designated for a third consecutive time.

== Gallery ==
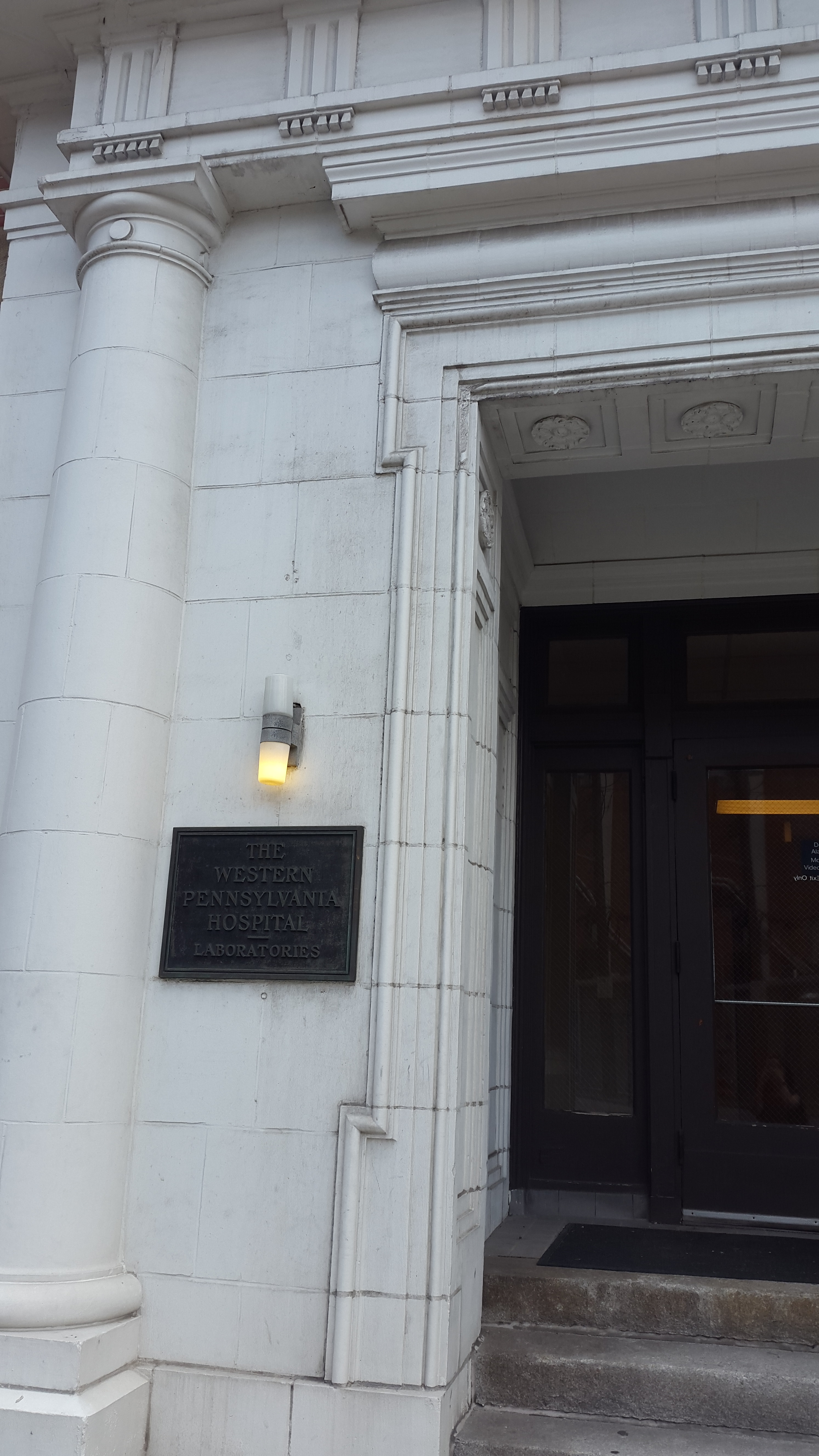
West Penn West Wing Entrance

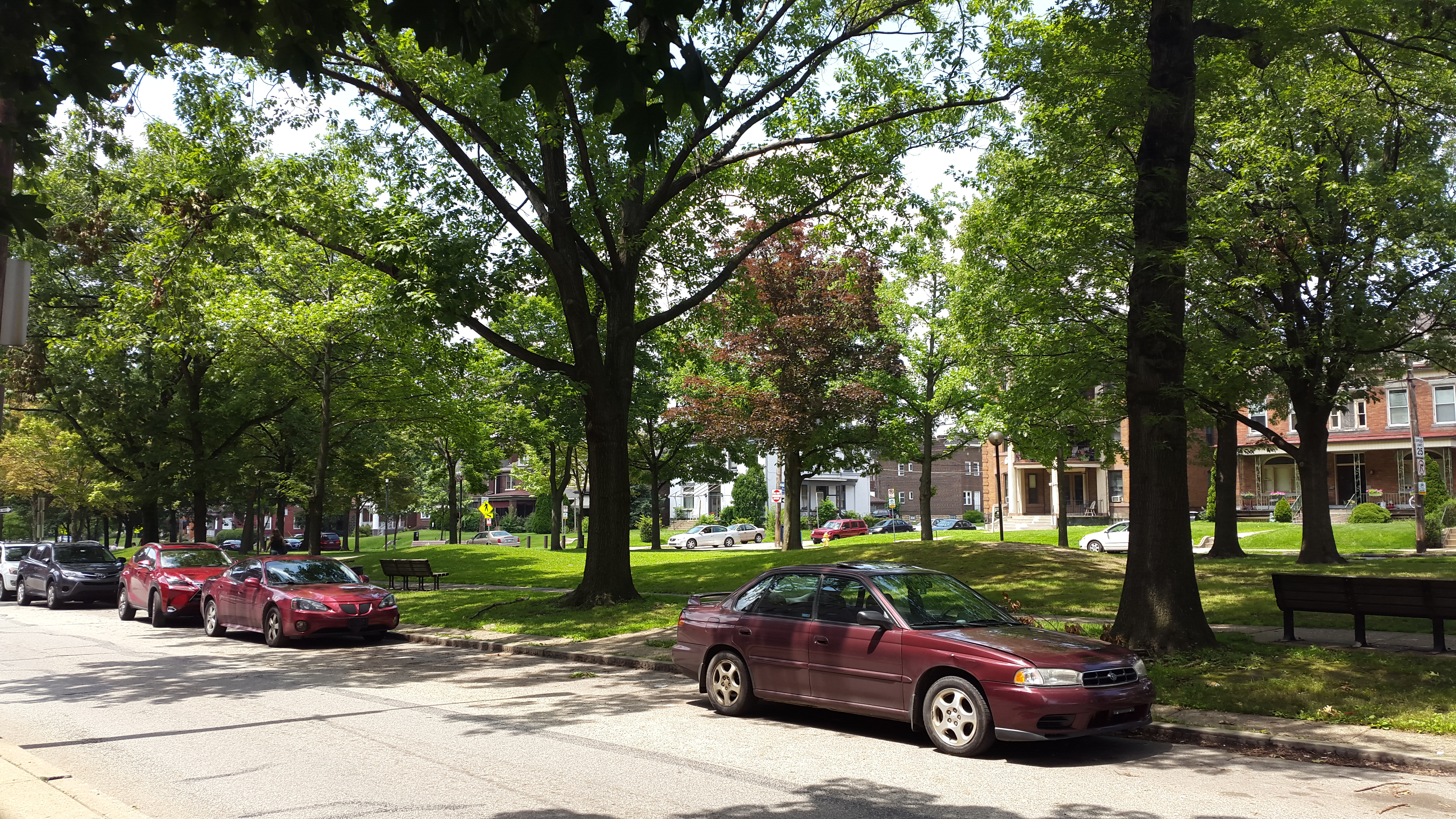
Friendship parklet next to West Penn

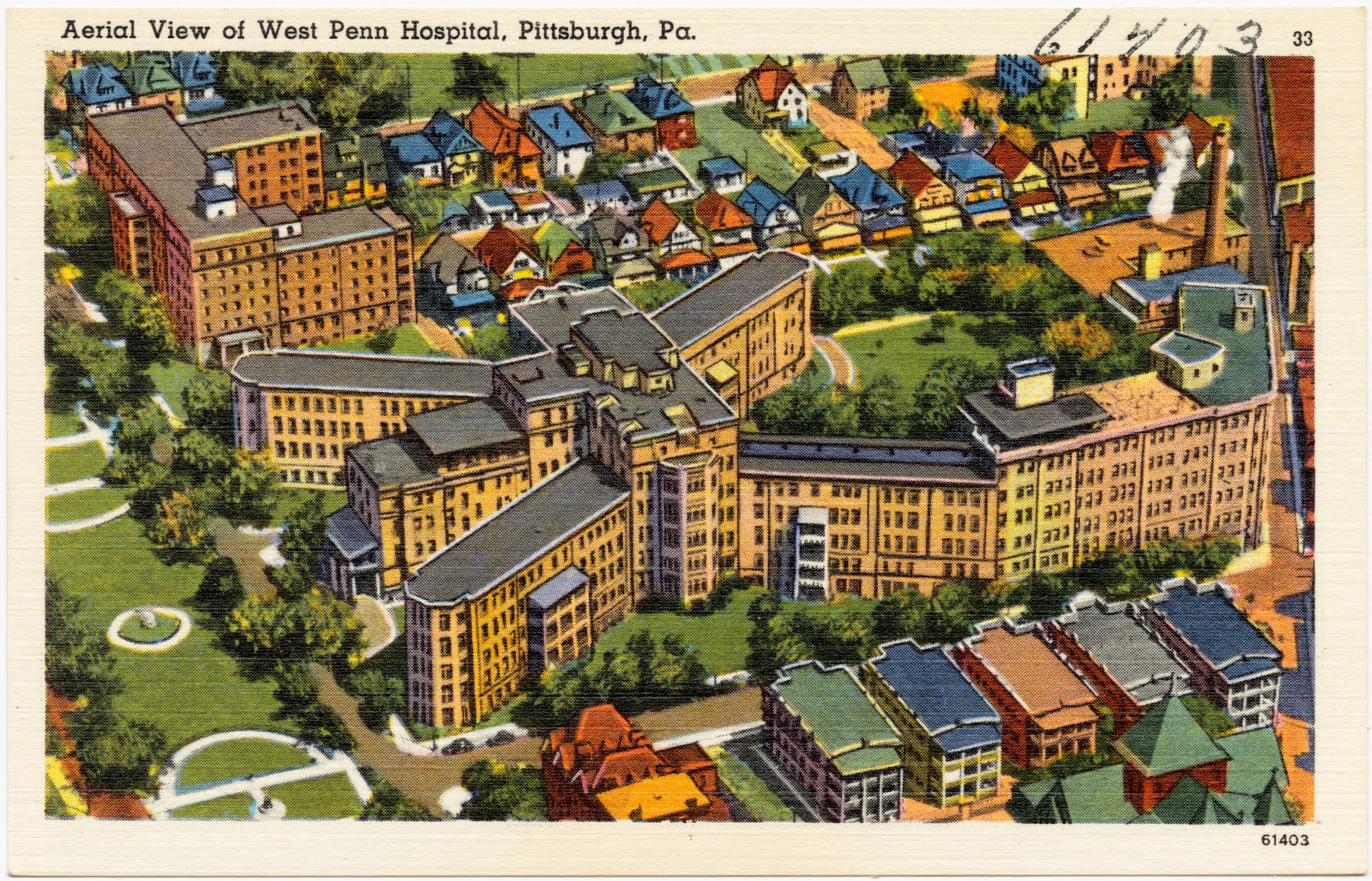
Aerial postcard view

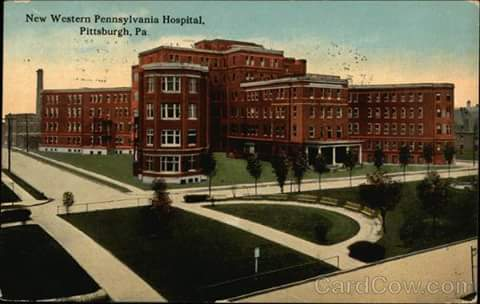
Old postcard view of the "new" West Penn Bloomfield site

== See also ==
- Allegheny General Hospital
- Allegheny Health Network
