= Aq Qaleh =

Aq Qaleh or Aqqaleh (Persian: اق قلعه) may refer to:

== Ardabil Province ==
- Aq Qaleh, Ardabil
- Aq Qaleh, Sareyn

== Golestan Province ==
- Aq Qaleh, Golestan

== Markazi Province ==
- Aq Qaleh, Markazi

== North Khorasan Province ==
- Aq Qaleh, Esfarayen
- Aq Qaleh, Shirvan

== West Azerbaijan Province ==
- Aq Qaleh, West Azerbaijan
