= Allegheny Health Network =

Medical system in Western Pennsylvania

- Type: Subsidiary
- Industry: Healthcare services
- Founded: 2013
- Headquarters: Pittsburgh, Pennsylvania, U.S.
- Number of locations: 16 hospitals, 300+ clinical locations (2026)
- Area served: Western Pennsylvania, Western New York, East Ohio, West Virginia, Western Maryland
- Key people: Mark Sevco (President); Bethany Casagranda (Chief Medical Officer); Brian Devine (Chief Financial Officer); Lou Baverso (Chief Operating Officer)
- Services: Quaternary and tertiary level clinical care, rehabilitation, cancer centers, community medical facilities, home health services
- Revenue: ▲US$5.7 billion (2025)
- Operating income: ▲US$90 million (2025)
- Net income: ▲US$125 million (2025)
- Number of employees: 27,000 (2026); 3,000 physicians (2026)
- Parent: Highmark Health
- Website: www.ahn.org

Allegheny Health Network (AHN), based in Pittsburgh, is a non-profit, 16-hospital academic medical system with facilities located in Western Pennsylvania and one hospital in Western New York. AHN was formed in 2013 when Highmark Inc., a Pennsylvania-based Blue Cross Blue Shield insurance carrier, purchased the assets of the West Penn Allegheny Health System (WPAHS) and added three more hospitals to its provider division. Allegheny Health Network was formed to act as the parent company to the WPAHS hospitals and its affiliate hospitals. Highmark Health today serves as the ultimate parent of AHN.

Today, AHN consists of an academic hospital and transplant center (AHN Allegheny General Hospital in Pittsburgh, the network's flagship), six tertiary-care hospitals, five community hospitals, and four "neighborhood hospitals." The network cares for patients from western Pennsylvania and the adjacent regions of Ohio, West Virginia, New York and Maryland at more than 250 clinical locations, including six “Health + Wellness Pavilions,” cancer clinics, surgical centers, outpatient clinics, and primary care locations.

The system includes the AHN Research Institute, the Allegheny Clinic, a home health and infusion company, a group-purchasing organization, LifeFlight, and the STAR Center, which provides simulation training for medical, nursing, and other health care professionals. The network operates two nursing schools, and serves as a clinical campus for the medical schools of Duquesne University, Drexel University and Lake Erie College of Osteopathic Medicine. AHN also operates one of the nation's largest graduate medical education programs, and its teaching hospitals annually train about 500 medical residents and fellows in 48 accredited programs and specialties.

As of 2026, AHN employs approximately 27,000 people, with over 3,000 employed and affiliated physicians, plus 2,000 volunteers. In 2025, AHN's facilities admitted and / or observed 130,000 patients, logged 400,000 emergency room visits, recorded 4.1 million physician visits, and delivered 8,700 babies.

== Facilities ==
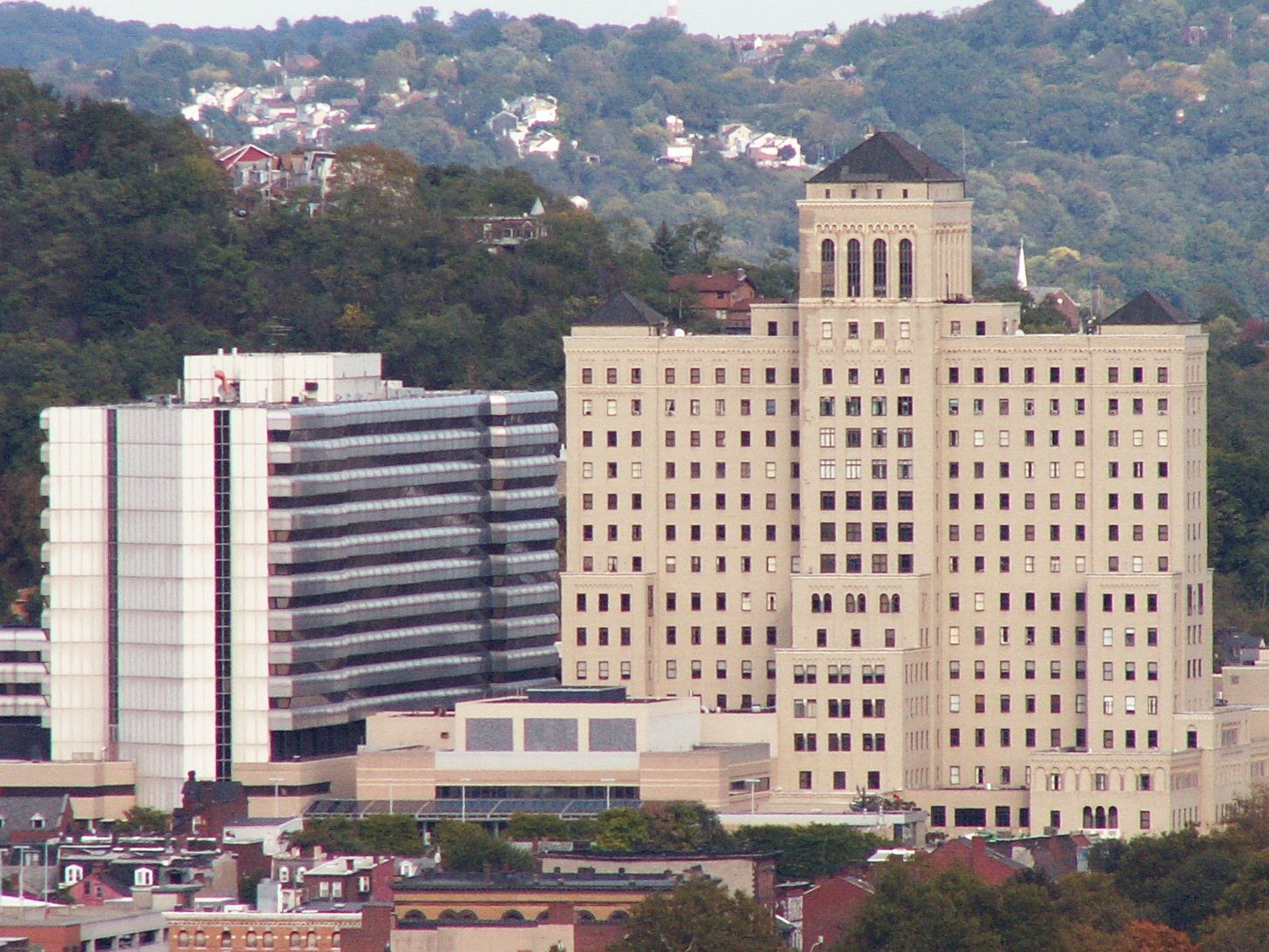
Allegheny General Hospital, the flagship facility of Allegheny Health Network.

=== AHN Allegheny General Hospital ===
Now the academic flagship of Allegheny Health Network, Allegheny General Hospital (AGH) began as a 50-bed infirmary, housed in two adjoining brick rowhouses in what was then Allegheny City, immediately north of Pittsburgh. While Pittsburgh itself had already established several hospitals, including West Penn Hospital, by the 1870s, Allegheny City needed one of its own to accommodate its burgeoning population and to care for the victims of fires, floods and disease outbreaks that often swept over the Ohio River's northern bank. Starting in 1881, the mayor of Allegheny City began meeting with a committee of physicians and prominent residents of Allegheny City, to discuss the construction of, and fund-raising for, a new North Side hospital. Three years later, the committee bought two adjacent properties along Stockton Avenue, near the modern-day Nova Place.

The hospital was officially chartered in 1882 and on Feb. 15, 1886, the forerunner to Allegheny General Hospital opened its doors. In 1887, the hospital established a children's wing, and in 1889, an ambulance was donated to the hospital; AGH would operate its own ambulance service for the next 64 years. A hospital annex was opened in June 1892, giving AGH additional surgical space. At the turn of the century, the hospital's directors began collecting funds for a new AGH, to be built just a block away, also along Stockton Avenue. The seven-story, 400-bed facility cost $620,000, and opened in 1904. The new space included more modern laboratory facilities: separate rooms for urinalysis, blood work, bacteriology, and autopsies. Within the decade, the hospital's board president, Dr. Maitland Alexander, convinced the kin of steel magnate William H. Singer to build a new, three-story research laboratory behind the hospital, which opened in 1916 and would later be known as the Singer Research Institute (now called the AHN Research Institute). Like many hospitals of that era, AGH distinguished itself during wartime; AGH was among the first medical institutions in the country to offer its services to the U.S. Department of War during WWI, and in 1918, the AGH Red Cross Unit made its way from Pittsburgh to Bourbonne-les-Bains, France, where a complement of AGH employees manned a French military hospital.

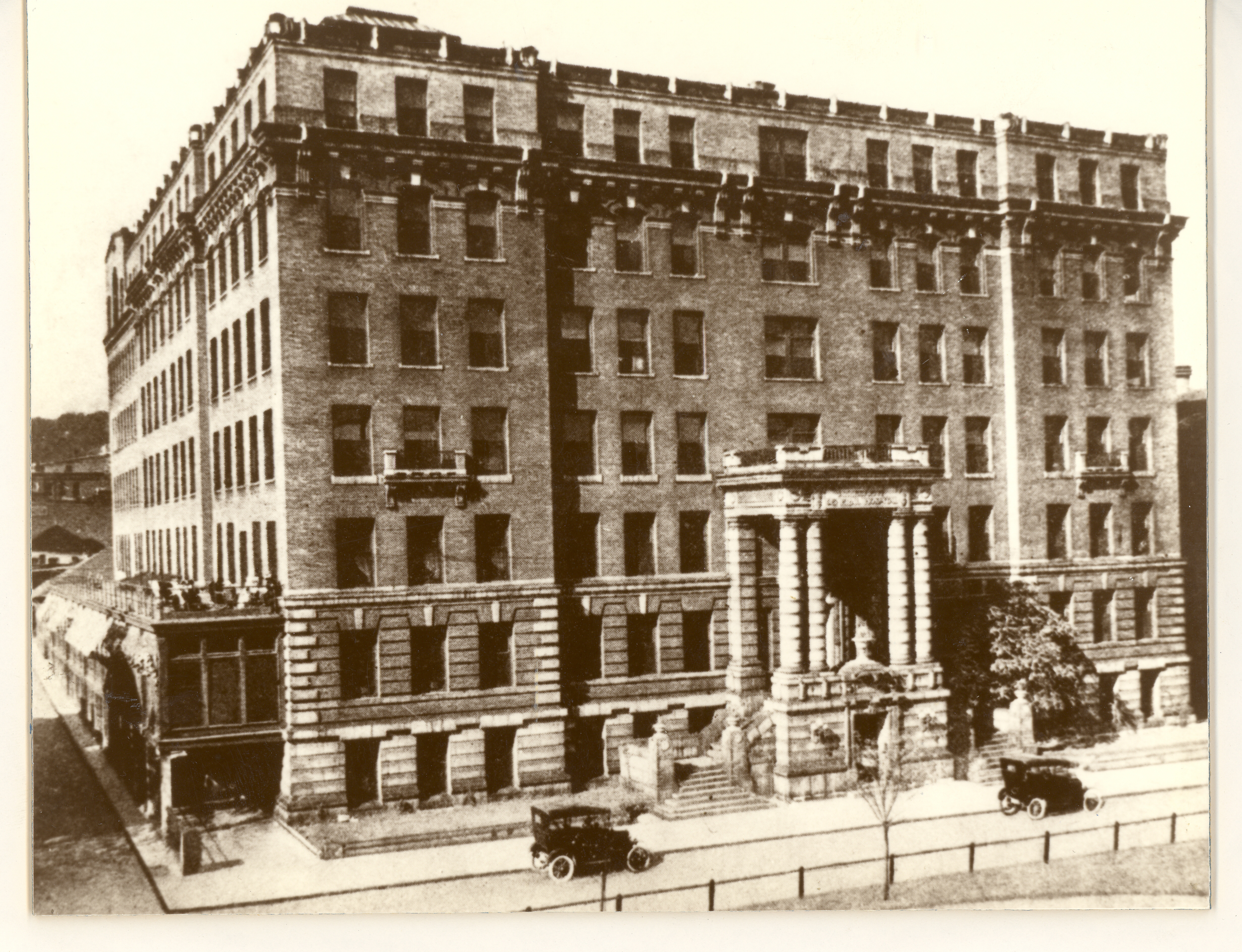
The second iteration of Allegheny General Hospital, at its former Stockton Avenue location.

Back home, Allegheny City and Pittsburgh continued to grow, and with the Stocktown Avenue AGH hemmed in by railroad tracks, the hospital board again looked for a location to build a new hospital. They found one 2,000 feet to the north. New York architecture firm York and Sawyer was hired to draw plans for what would be one of the nation's first “skyscraper” hospitals, and by 1929, construction was underway. The cornerstone was laid in 1930, and the plastering was almost finished by 1931. The Great Depression interrupted construction, but the U.S. Public Works Administration loaned AGH the $2 million that it needed to complete the project, and on June 24, 1936, the third iteration of Allegheny General Hospital was formally dedicated. The 22-story, $8 million hospital had 1,300 separate rooms, including 162 private patient rooms. Built in the Lombard architectural style, the cream-brick tower was an instant landmark structure, visible for miles; the high rise is now designated a Pittsburgh History and Landmarks Foundation historic landmark. The new hospital featured multiple kitchens, a pediatric wing, maternity wards, an x-ray department and a cardiology department; pneumatic tubes, call boxes and a state-of-the-art phone system helped hospital employees communicate.

In the decades that followed World War II, the hospital continued to expand and build, adding a new East Wing, and in 1981, a new inpatient tower, the $104 million Snyder Pavilion. AGH also continued to push the boundaries of medicine and research in those decades, particularly in the areas of thoracic surgery, shock trauma care, cancer treatment, orthopaedic surgery, organ transplants and, most notably, open-heart surgery. Built on the foundation laid by world renowned surgical pioneer George Magovern, by 1998, AGH was performing more than 1,500 open-heart procedures annually, the largest volume of any hospital in the state, serving patients from across the country and around the world. Today, Allegheny General is a 552-bed quaternary care and educational hospital, and it is AHN's highest-volume hospital, seeing 24,000 inpatient admissions, 23,000 surgeries, and nearly 56,000 emergency department visits each year. Over the last five years, AGH has invested in a new orthopaedic center, a new cardiovascular intensive care unit, a new cardiac MRI center, new hybrid operating rooms, an ambulatory surgery center and some of the world's most technologically advanced surgical robots.

In 2020, a new academic cancer center opened on the AGH campus.

In the early 1980s, AGH's directors created a nonprofit holding company, called the Allegheny Health, Education and Research Foundation, to operate the hospital. That foundation ultimately collapsed in one of the nation's largest nonprofit bankruptcies (see AHERF).

AGH and AHN continue to own and operate AHN Suburban, a satellite campus in Bellevue, Pa., formerly known as Suburban General Hospital. Suburban General opened in Bellevue in 1904, and has been at its current South Jackson Avenue location since 1912. AHN's predecessor, West Penn Allegheny Health System, acquired the facility in 1994. In 2010, the hospital's inpatient units, surgical units, and emergency department closed, though the building continued to house administrative offices, an urgent care clinic, outpatient services, and a privately operated long-term care hospital. While AHN Suburban's urgent care clinic and outpatient clinics continue to operate, LifeCare Hospitals of Pittsburgh's nursing facility closed in June 2019.

Today, the AHN Suburban location serves as an innovation hub and health technology business incubator.

==== Relationship with 'The Pitt' ====
In 2024, it was announced that AGH would serve as the inspiration and visual backdrop for the fictional Pittsburgh Trauma Medical Center, the hospital featured in "The Pitt," an Emmy-winning medical procedural drama series produced by Warner Bros. Television and airing on HBO Max. The show is partially filmed at AGH, and at other outdoor locations near the hospital. In 2026, it was announced that The Pitt had been renewed for a third season.

=== AHN Allegheny Valley Hospital ===
Allegheny Valley Hospital (AVH) has served Natrona Heights, Pa., and the surrounding community for over 100 years. AVH has 188 licensed beds and provides emergency care, surgical care, rehabilitation care and other health care services for its patients. Like many of its Western Pennsylvania counterparts, Allegheny Valley Hospital was built to serve the region's flourishing industrial towns. By the late 1800s, industrial activity had reached the town of Tarentum, about 22 miles northeast of Pittsburgh and home to lumber and saw mills, steel mills, brick kilns, and several plate glass factories. Serious injuries were a daily occurrence, but without a hospital, many patients were sent by train to a hospital in Pittsburgh. In 1906 a committee of doctors and prominent area residents secured a charter for the establishment of what was then called the Allegheny Valley General Hospital. Under the leadership of Dr. George Getze, the committee leased a property along Tarentum's Second Avenue, and the hospital was open for business on Jan. 28, 1909.

It was a three-story home, with only 20 rooms available for patient visits and surgeries, and in 1910, the hospital was moved to its second location, a larger house along West Seventh Avenue, just downriver from the original home. This home, too, became quickly obsolete, and soon the hospital leaders agreed to buy a piece of land near the old Tarentum Fairground for $12,000.

The new 98-bed Natrona Heights hospital was dedicated on May 24, 1919. The three-story, brick and terra cotta structure remains standing today, at the center of what is now a much larger Allegheny Valley Hospital. In the century that has passed since the third AVH opened, the hospital has added to that original foundation, building a nurses wing in 1928, a north wing in 1943, a $2 million south wing in 1958, a laboratory in 1974, and a four-level, $26.5 million addition in 1983 that houses AVH's emergency department, radiology, and other units.

Today, AVH sees nearly 6,000 inpatient admissions and 40,000 emergency department visits, and performs 5,000 surgeries. In recent years, AVH had added new inpatient units, cardiac MRI and rehabilitation services, robotic surgery capabilities, and inpatient rehab services for patients who have sustained trauma or strokes. It primarily serves residents living in Northeastern Allegheny County, Westmoreland County, Armstrong County and Butler County.

For a decade in the early 2000s, AVH was formally known as the Alle-Kiski Medical Center. In 2011, the name reverted to Allegheny Valley Hospital. In 2000, AVH also affiliated with the nearby Citizens School of Nursing, which opened in 1913 and continues to educate nursing students today. In 2019, that nursing school moved to a new campus in Tarentum, in the Pittsburgh Mills mall.

AVH was an independent hospital through most of its history. In 1997, it was acquired by AHERF. Following the bankruptcy of AHERF, AVH became an affiliate of West Penn Allegheny Health System. After WPAHS was acquired by Highmark Inc., AVH became an affiliate of the new Allegheny Health Network in 2013.

=== AHN Beaver Hospital ===
AHN Beaver, formerly Heritage Valley Beaver, joined AHN in 2026 through AHN's affiliation with Heritage Valley Health System.

Though the current campus is 46 years old, the hospital has a legacy of care dating to the 1800s. Beaver Valley Hospital opened Jan. 1, 1895, in Beaver Falls, Pa.

Then called Beaver Valley General, the hospital soon outgrew its original home, and within two years moved to a former boys’ school in New Brighton. Over time, Beaver Valley merged with Providence Hospital in Beaver Falls and Rochester General Hospital in Rochester, Pa., consolidations that finally formed the Medical Center of Beaver County in 1972.

By 1975, that organization had scoped out land in Brighton Twp., Pa. – about 25 miles northwest of Downtown Pittsburgh – to serve as the location for its new 542-bed hospital headquarters. The sprawling medical campus opened in June 1980 and was subsequently renamed Heritage Valley Beaver, following the formation of Heritage Valley Health System in 1996.

As of 2024, AHN Beaver was a 285-bed tertiary care hospital with 8,800 admissions and more than 700 live births a year.

=== AHN Canonsburg Hospital ===
AHN Canonsburg Hospital is a community hospital located just outside Canonsburg, Pa. Canonsburg Hospital was formed 1904, when, according to the Pittsburgh Post-Gazette, “the Women's Shakespeare Club of Canonsburg solicited donations of ‘linens, supplies, a hen and brood of chickens and a generous supply of fruit’ for what turned out to be an ambitious if not unusual project for a literary club. ... [But], as history records, this Women's Shakespeare Club's project ended well and proved to be much ado about something pretty special: medical care. For what the Women's Shakespeare Club of Canonsburg started [was] Canonsburg General Hospital.”

The club raised $2,000 to help buy a house on Barr Street in Canonsburg, which served as the hospital for 10 years. They also formed the Canonsburg General Hospital Association to oversee the hospital's operations. The hospital opened at its original Barr Street location on Oct. 17, 1904, and the first patient was a woman who was “traveling with her husband in a horse and carriage from the village of Midland in Chartiers to Canonsburg when the berserk horse sent them flying.”

The following year, the hospital opened a nursing school, which remained in operation until 1960. In 1913, the hospital board agreed to construct a new hospital building, also on Barr Street, which grew to 54 beds by 1930. The “new” Barr Street hospital eventually named its dining room after the singer Perry Como, who was born in Canonsburg in 1912.

By the late 1970s, Canonsburg Hospital had outgrown its red-brick Barr Street home, and in 1979 the hospital applied to the Pennsylvania Department of Health to build a new hospital. At the time in Pennsylvania, new hospital construction had to be approved by the state through a “certificate of need.” The application for a certificate of need was initially rejected by the state on the grounds that existing hospitals in the area had enough capacity to handle projected patient volume, but Canonsburg-area residents lobbied then-Pennsylvania Gov. Dick Thornburgh with “more than 5,000 letters [and] 2,000 mail-grams demanding the department approve the project.” In 1981, the Health Department issued a certificate of need, and a new hospital was built in North Strabane Township, just outside of Canonsburg borough. The new $15.8 million hospital opened May 14, 1983, on 31 acres; the former Barr Street hospital is now a personal care and retirement home.

In 2000, Canonsburg Hospital joined the former West Penn Allegheny Health System. In 2013, it became a part of Allegheny Health Network. The current 104-bed inpatient facility has undergone several expansions since its 1983 opening: In 1996, a new ambulatory care center was opened; in 2003, the physical therapy department was enlarged; in 2006, the emergency department was expanded to accommodate increased patient volume; and since its affiliation with AHN in 2013, the hospital has opened a sleep lab. The hospital primarily serves residents living in southern Allegheny and northern Washington counties. Canonsburg annually admits over 4,000 patients and logs approximately 21,000 emergency visits, and performs nearly 3,000 surgeries.

In 2023, AHN announced that it would be building a new Canonsburg Hospital, on the same North Strabane campus where the current hospital sits.

=== AHN Forbes Hospital ===
When Monroeville's first hospital opened its doors in 1978 to accommodate communities along the fast-developing U.S. Route 22 corridor, it was known as East Suburban Health Center, joining two other hospitals in the young Forbes Health System. That system was created in 1972 following the merger of Columbia Hospital in Wilkinsburg and Pittsburgh Hospital in East Liberty; both of those facilities still exist and are now privately owned rehabilitation hospitals.

Planning for a Monroeville hospital began in the 1960s, when two rival groups competed for the rights to build a new medical facility in eastern Allegheny County. East Suburban General Hospital group, aligned with West Penn Hospital, wanted to build along Mosside Boulevard. Forbes Health System wanted to build on a site next to the Parkway East. In 1973, those competing groups joined forces. Construction began in 1975. The merged group decided to keep the Forbes name, because all of the hospitals in the existing Forbes Health System – Pittsburgh Hospital, Columbia Hospital and the new Monroeville hospital – were along the old Forbes Road, a historic military path built in the 1700s from Carlisle to Pittsburgh.

The East Suburban Health Center opened in spring of 1978, with 257 beds, serving much of eastern Allegheny County and parts of Westmoreland and Armstrong Counties. In 1983, health system leaders changed the hospital's name to the Forbes Regional Health Center, and in 1996, the Forbes Health Care system entered into a merger with the Allegheny Health, Education and Research Foundation (AHERF), which was then the parent company of Allegheny General Hospital. Canonsburg Hospital and Allegheny Valley Hospital also became members of AHERF and its Pittsburgh area hospital-management arm, Allegheny University Medical Center. Following AHERF's collapse and bankruptcy filing, in 2000, Forbes Regional joined the newly created West Penn Allegheny Health System, and in 2013 became part of Allegheny Health Network.

Today, clinicians at Forbes provide access to obstetrics care, cardiovascular surgery, cancer care, neurosurgery, diabetes care, orthopaedic surgery, and many other advanced specialties. More than 700 physicians are on staff at the hospital, and each year Forbes delivers over a thousand babies and treats more than 40,000 patients in its emergency department. In recent years, Forbes has continued to invest significantly in its capabilities, adding state-of-the-art robotic surgical technology, opening an inpatient rehabilitation unit, expanding and upgrading its intensive care facilities, enhancing its labor and delivery services, and establishing has the region's first and only Level II Trauma Center. In 2015, Forbes became the first hospital within AHN to go live with a new fully integrated health records system, Epic; in 2017, Forbes broke ground on a perioperative center expansion, and in 2019 it opened a new free-standing cancer center.

=== AHN Grove City Hospital ===
Grove City Medical Center, now AHN Grove City, was created in 1978, through the merger of two existing Grove City, Pa., hospitals – the former Grove City Hospital and the former Bashline Memorial Hospital. Both hospitals were founded in the early 1900s, and by the mid-1970s, neither one could fill its beds.

The two hospitals were separated by just a few blocks, but they practiced medicine somewhat differently: Grove City was staffed by allopathic physicians (MDs), while Bashline was staffed by osteopaths (DOs). Those living in Grove City were staunchly loyal to one or the other; at the time of the merger, longtime Grove City resident and hospital board chairman Alvin Schell said that the difference of opinion was practically a political schism. “You were a Republican or you were a Democrat,” he told an Associated Press reporter. “You went to an osteopath or you went to a medical doctor.” Both MDs and DOs are physicians, but DOs view their practice as a more holistic approach to medicine, and to the patient. Today, about 90 percent of U.S. physicians are MDs.

The community and its physicians put their differences aside, supporting the merger of the two hospitals into a single organization. In November 1981, the merged organization cut the ribbon on United Community Hospital, a new 128-bed medical center.

United changed its name to Grove City Medical Center in 2006. Today, the hospital is an 67-bed acute care facility in Mercer County that operates six outpatient clinics and lab sites throughout its service footprint. It provides cancer care, cardiac care, general surgery, lab services, home health and diagnostic imaging, among other clinical services. Its emergency department, accredited as a Level IV Trauma Center since 2014, treats about 17,000 patients annually.

Despite national trends, about half of Grove City's staff physicians are still DOs, and the hospital remained independent for more than 40 years.

The hospital celebrated its 40th anniversary in 2018. In 2020, Grove City Medical Center officially became a part of AHN and was renamed AHN Grove City.

=== AHN Jefferson Hospital ===
Jefferson Hospital, nine miles south of Downtown Pittsburgh, opened its doors in 1977 at its current Jefferson Hills campus, and can trace its roots to the early 20th Century. Jefferson, formerly known as Jefferson Regional Medical Center, was created through the merger of two older hospitals: St. Joseph's Hospital in Pittsburgh's South Side, which opened in 1904, and Homestead Hospital, which began treating patients in 1908.

Both hospitals were originally built close to steel mills, and cared for the people who worked in them. Eventually, those hospitals moved to larger facilities, then merged in 1973, and together they were known as the South Hills Health System. In 1977, the new Coal Valley Road hospital opened, to accommodate Pittsburgh's rapidly growing southern suburbs. Later, the health system changed its name to Jefferson Regional Medical Center, and by the mid-'80s, the hospital had added an ambulatory surgery center, a new professional medical building, and was operating one of the largest home-care nursing programs in the area.

In 2013, Jefferson Regional officially joined Allegheny Health Network. Today, Jefferson is a 341-bed hospital that serves the city's South Hills. Annually, its clinicians perform 17,000 surgeries and treat more than 50,000 patients seeking emergency care. Over the last decade, Jefferson has established a leading open-heart surgery and cardiovascular disease program, added advanced neurology and neurosurgical services, and developed a new comprehensive, state-of-the-art cancer center, which includes 20 infusion chairs and two patient beds for treatments, a patient education library, and a comprehensive resource center for patients and their families to learn more about nutrition and supportive care services available to them.

In 2014, Jefferson also added a new labor and delivery unit, the first new OB program and unit to be built at a Pennsylvania hospital in three decades. The new OB unit also features a Level II neonatal nursery for special needs, two dedicated cesarean-section rooms, 24/7 obstetric anesthesia and newborn services, numerous patient services and amenities, and the latest in infant security technology. It now delivers more than 1,300 babies annually.

In recent years, Jefferson has also added advanced robotic surgery and orthopaedic surgery, neurosurgery, and behavioral health services, and in 2019 Jefferson Hospital opened a $21 million expansion of its emergency department.

=== AHN Saint Vincent Hospital ===
In the 1870s in Erie, Pa., the Sisters of St. Joseph began raising money to build what would be Erie's first medical institution. On Sept. 5, 1875, Saint Vincent Hospital opened; at a cost of $7,000, it was a three-story, 12-bed hospital staffed by one surgeon and seven Sisters, who handled “everything from nursing to laundry.” According to hospital historians, “The Sisters' ministry to the sick began with an unfortunate accident in front of the St. Joseph orphanage in 1874. After caring for an injured man, other cases were soon brought to the Sisters, until demand became so great that Mother Agnes Spencer obtained permission from Bishop Mullen to build the hospital.”

As the Erie region expanded, the hospital quickly outgrew its original three-story home, and by 1900 a new “Old Main” annex was established, followed by the creation of a nursing school (1901); yet another annex (E Building in 1911); a nurses home (1925) and a new diagnostic building and 65-bed maternity ward (1939). All of the new facilities were built on Saint Vincent's original Sassafras Street campus. After World War II came another round of expansion, and in the 1950s hospital leaders revealed plans to build a new, air-conditioned four-story inpatient center with diagnostic, X-ray, physiotherapy, lab and clinical facilities, and remodeling of business quarters.

It 1978, a helipad was added, allowing for air transport of critically ill or injured patients to and from the hospital. In the 1980s, Saint Vincent teamed partnered with nearby Hamot Medical Center to create a jointly operated “Tri-State Regional Trauma Center” and a “Tri-State Regional Cancer Center;” those partnerships have since been dissolved.

By the late 1980 and early 1990s, Saint Vincent was one of the busiest hospitals in the state, necessitating additional expansion; the Saint Vincent Outpatient Surgery Center opened, and a new multi-story South Building would house maternity, intensive-care units, engineering areas, a new entrance and lobby, cardio-technical services, and the laboratory. In 2008, Saint Vincent's Neonatal Intensive Care Unit (NICU) was renovated and opened in September of that year; the new 10,000-square foot facility featured 19 individual, private pods for families to bond with their babies. That year, 2,308 babies were delivered at SVH.

In 2012, Saint Vincent's board voted to pursue a “strategic affiliation” with Highmark Inc. The following year, Highmark officially created Allegheny Health Network, and Saint Vincent joined the new network as its northwestern Pennsylvania hub.

In 2017, Highmark and AHN announced $115 million in capital investments for Saint Vincent and the Erie region, including a new emergency department, new operating suites, a new Women and Infants Center, and a new Health + Wellness Pavilion. In 2018, Saint Vincent broke ground on the new pavilion and a new free-standing cancer center. Those facilities opened in 2019.

=== AHN Sewickley Hospital ===
AHN Sewickley, formerly Heritage Valley Sewickley, joined AHN in 2026 through AHN's affiliation with Heritage Valley Health System. The former Sewickley Valley Hospital was chartered in 1902 and opened in 1907 with just 14 beds, but it quickly expanded. By the late 1920s, the original structure "was being remodeled as a dormitory and school of nursing, and a new main hospital building was being added" at the same location, according to the Pittsburgh Post-Gazette.

Over the years, Sewickley Valley added new buildings and units, including an expanded emergency department and new obstetrical unit, which closed in 2023. In 1977, it completed a new ambulatory services building, and about a decade later it began work on a significant expansion that included a new surgical suites, waiting area and recovery area; a new parking garage; and an expanded south wing.

As of 2024, AHN Sewickley was a 210-bed hospital that reported 4,100 annual admissions.

=== AHN Westfield Memorial Hospital ===
Founded in 1942, Westfield Memorial Hospital is an affiliate of Saint Vincent Hospital, which is 30 miles to the southwest. It is the only AHN hospital outside of the state of Pennsylvania.

Westfield is a four-bed acute care hospital that serves several communities in New York's largely rural Chautauqua County. In 2018, Westfield Memorial unveiled its new five-bed emergency department; the updated facility includes “four new treatment rooms and one large trauma room, along with a newly painted ambulance vestibule.”

In 2016, Westfield was reaccredited as an acute-care hospital by the New York Commission on Health Care Facilities in the 21st Century, the culmination of a multi-year evaluation process that reviewed the services, capacities and capabilities of all of New York's hospitals. As a result of that evaluation process, Westfield was given a five-year “limited life” operating certificate in 2011. At the time, Westfield had been a 32-bed facility, and the state recommended turning Westfield into a standalone “diagnostic center” without emergency services. The Westfield community rallied around the hospital and “convinced the state of New York that this may not be the right thing to do,” according to The Observer of Dunkirk, NY. In response to the public lobbying, Westfield remained a full-service acute-care hospital, but was required to “find ways to make improvements and provide their services more effectively to the community.”

Westfield became an affiliate of the St. Vincent Medical Center on Jan. 1, 1999. As part of Saint Vincent, WMH became a part of AHN in 2013. The emergency department treats about 7,500 annually. Westfield has about 75 full-time and part-time employees.

=== AHN West Penn Hospital ===
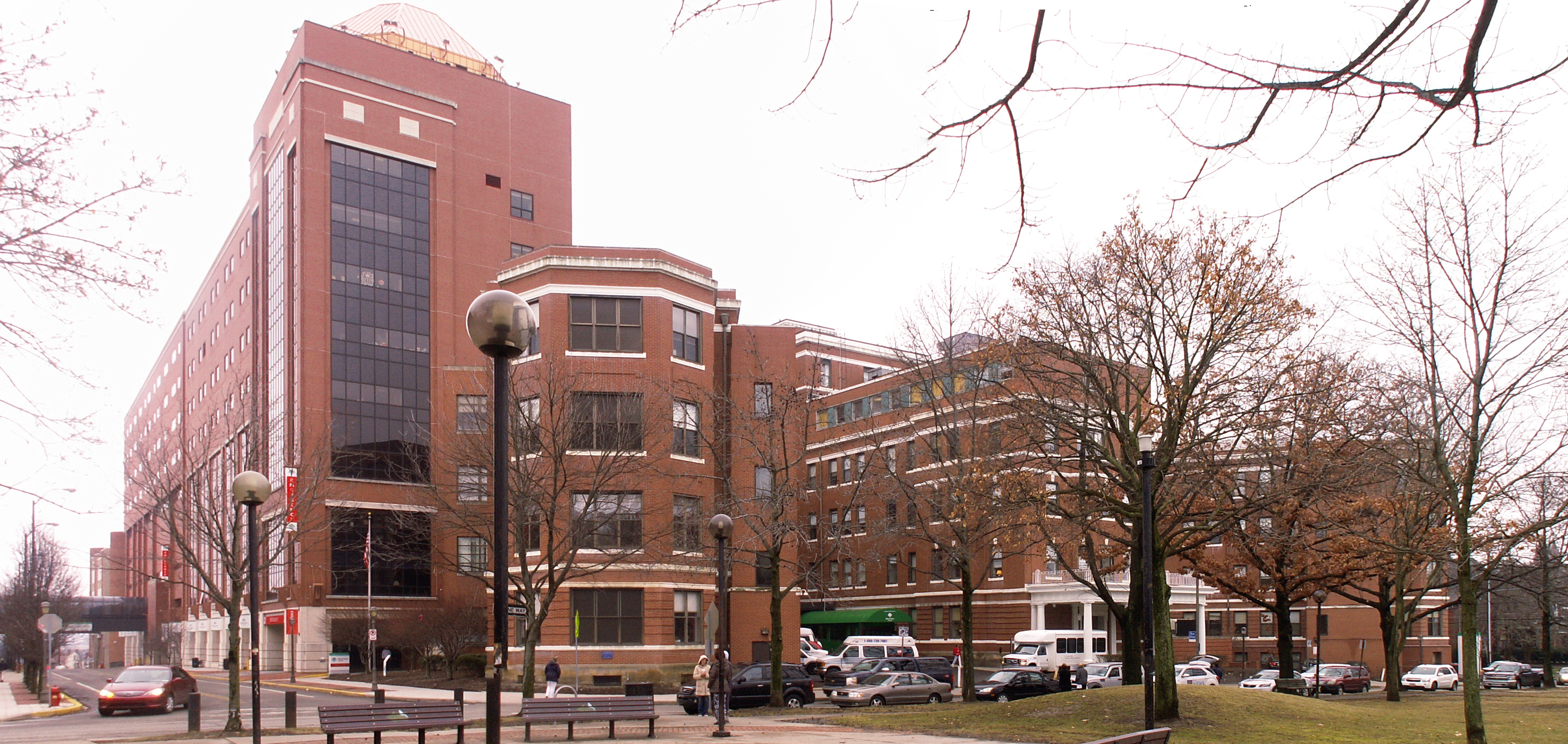
West Penn Hospital, in Pittsburgh's Bloomfield neighborhood.

When the Western Pennsylvania Hospital was chartered in 1848, Pittsburgh was a growing iron town, one of the largest American cities west of the Allegheny Mountains. It was a prosperous city, but it was also a dirty and dangerous one. Industrial accidents were common, and outbreaks of smallpox, scarlet fever, diphtheria and other scourges were common among Pittsburgh's 45,000 residents, thousands of whom were immigrant laborers from Europe.

To care for these sick, injured or destitute immigrants, Pittsburgh began building hospitals. The first to be built were religiously affiliated, but soon, city stewards agreed that Pittsburgh would also need a publicly charted hospital that could provide health care for all, without sectarian restrictions. In 1847, Henry D. Sellers, M.D., proposed a new hospital in Pittsburgh's 12th ward, on a hillside overlooking the city's Strip District and adjacent to what is now Polish Hill (today, that plot is home to a ballfield and West Penn Park, named in honor of the hospital). On March 18, 1848, the hospital was formally incorporated, and the four-story, 120-patient hospital finally opened in spring 1853, after five years of design and construction.

In its first year of operation, 172 patients were admitted, and only 24 of those admitted had the means to pay for their stay. Because so many of the patients were indigent (most people who could afford medical care were treated by house-call doctors), the nurses and physicians who were recruited to work at West Penn did so voluntarily, in three-month rotations. They treated patients with the medicines of the day — mercury, opium, tobacco and calomel.

Many of those who were treated at West Penn during its earliest days had mental illnesses, and it was soon clear that they needed more than hospital care — they need a specialized facility of their own. In 1862, West Penn opened the Dixmont Hospital (known officially as the "Department of the Insane in the Western Pennsylvania Hospital of Pittsburgh”) on a steep bluff overlooking the Ohio River, about eight miles downriver from West Penn. That hospital, the first specialized mental health facility in Western Pennsylvania, remained under West Penn's ownership until 1907, after which Dixmont was independently controlled.

Eight years after the opening of West Penn Hospital, America was at war with itself. While the fighting didn't come to Pittsburgh, wounded soldiers did, and West Penn became a primary triage center serving Union forces. Because of its size, and because it was a public hospital not bound by religious affiliations, the United States government commandeered West Penn Hospital in 1862, making alterations to it and turning it into a military hospital for the next three years. (Civilians could still be treated at West Penn in emergency situations). By the end of the Civil War in 1865, some 3,000 soldiers had been treated at West Penn. Some never recovered to full health, staying in the east wing of the hospital in what became known as the Soldiers Home.

In 1883, West Penn surgeons and doctors chartered the Western Pennsylvania Medical College, which began with a class of 57 students in September 1886. The region's first medical school, the college became the medical department of what is now known as the University of Pittsburgh in 1892, and was completely integrated into the university in 1908. Similarly, by 1890, work was underway on a new nursing school and dormitory, another first for the region.

At the turn of the 20th Century, Pittsburgh was booming, and West Penn had outgrown its busy Strip District home. Smoky, noisy and buffeted by railroad yards, the hillside was referred to as the “Golgotha of the Iron City.” The hospital needed electricity, more modern rooms, and a better location, and the hospital's board — populated by names like Heinz, Frick, Carnegie, Mellon and Horne — agreed to build a new hospital in Pittsburgh's Bloomfield neighborhood, about a mile to the east. The cornerstone was laid in 1909, and on New Year's Day, 1912, the new West Penn Hospital opened. The six-story, X-shaped hospital was able to accommodate up to 500 patients, and featured modern operating rooms, laboratories, and X-ray machines.

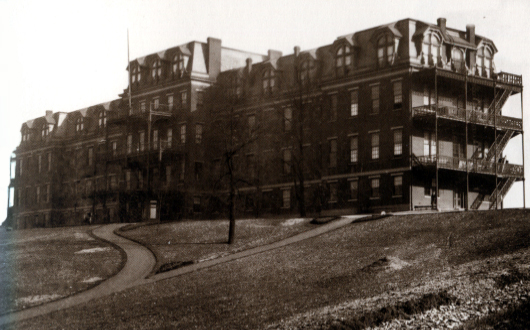
The old West Penn Hospital building, at the base of Pittsburgh's Polish Hill and near the busy industrial center known as the Strip District.

The new hospital and its staff would be tested repeatedly over the coming years — the 1918 flu epidemic saw West Penn again commandeered by the federal government, the Great Depression eroded the financial resources of West Penn and nearly every other American hospital, and World War II drained West Penn of physicians and nurses.

West Penn survived those tests, and after the war, in 1950, West Penn added a new obstetrical wing, an intensive care unit came in 1958, and by the 1960s, another substantial expansion was underway. Led by board President Aiken Fisher, West Penn launched a capital campaign to build a new entrance to the hospital along Millvale Avenue, and to build a new ambulatory care center along Liberty Avenue (to be named Mellon Pavilion). Both Mellon Pavilion and the hospital's renowned Burn Care Unit opened in 1970, a heliport was added in 1971, and the East Tower, which specialized in diagnostic and critical care, opened in 1981. A nine-story patient care tower was added in 1995, topped by a copper dome visible for miles.

The late 1990s and early 2000s resulted in several changes to West Penn's governance structure. Following the fall of AHERF and its historic 1998 bond default, West Penn Hospital agreed to rescue AGH and its affiliates through a merger. As an alternative to bankruptcy liquidation, AGH, Forbes, Allegheny Valley and Canonsburg “were transferred to the West Penn system in 1999 in exchange for a $25 million payment to the creditors, who agreed to release [AGH] from liability for all claims.” That new system was known as the West Penn Allegheny Health System.

In 2010, as parent company West Penn Allegheny Health System was experiencing severe cash shortages and financial difficulties, WPAHS leadership agreed to close West Penn's emergency room as a cost-saving measure. It closed on Jan. 1, 2011, and remained closed until February 2012, after WPAHS had reached an agreement in principle with Highmark Inc. regarding the acquisition of the hospital system. That agreement was announced in June 2011, and without the affiliation and capital infusion from Highmark, had “another investor not materialized, WPAHS was preparing a budget that would have included the autumn closure of West Penn Hospital,” according to the Pittsburgh Post-Gazette. West Penn became a part of Allegheny Health Network in 2013.

Today, West Penn Hospital is a 333-bed academic medical center; its obstetrical program delivers nearly 4,500 babies a year, and the hospital's Level III neonatal intensive care unit, its adult and pediatric certified burn trauma center, its extended-hours oncology clinic, and dozens of other services draw patients from across the state. West Penn was also the first hospital in the region to earn Magnet Recognition status from the American Nurses Credentialing Center, an achievement denoting the quality of a hospital's nursing team. West Penn's marrow and stem cell transplantation program is one of the most sophisticated in the country and one of the busiest in the state.

=== AHN Wexford Hospital ===
AHN Wexford is a 160-bed, $313 million, 345,000-square-foot hospital built along Route 19, north of Pittsburgh. Opened in the fall of 2021, AHN Wexford is the network's newest full-service hospital, and includes a 24-bed emergency department, operating rooms with minimally invasive robotic surgery capabilities; a cardiac catheterization lab and hybrid OR for advanced surgical procedures; a short-stay observation unit; an adult intensive care unit; and comprehensive women's and infants' care.

The women's unit includes the only labor and delivery unit based in northern Allegheny County, as well as high-risk obstetrical services and a Level II neonatal intensive care unit. In 2023, the hospital expanded its pediatric capabilities to include inpatient pediatric care.

=== Neighborhood hospitals ===
In February 2020, AHN opened AHN Hempfield Neighborhood Hospital, a small-scale hospital in Westmoreland County, Pa. In March, the network opened two more small-scale hospitals, in Brentwood, Pa., and McCandless, Pa., and the fourth and final neighborhood hospital opened in October 2020 in Harmar township, Pa. The hospitals are jointly designed and operated by Emerus; they each have a 24-hour emergency room, as well as 10-12 inpatient beds, imaging services, and a variety of outpatient services. The Hempfield hospital is also attached to a newly built cancer center.

=== Health + Wellness Pavilions ===
Allegheny Health Network is home to six Health + Wellness Pavilions, one-stop-shop medical malls that provide patients with access to a comprehensive array of retail, preventive, diagnostic and therapeutic health care services, under one roof. These large-scale pavilions were designed to provide patients and physicians with a well-organized, uniquely integrated and multi-disciplinary approach to disease management, prevention and wellness. The first of these pavilions opened in 2014 in Wexford (Allegheny County). Since then, AHN has opened Health + Wellness Pavilions in Peters (Washington County), Bethel Park (Allegheny County), North Fayette Township (Allegheny County), and two in Erie County.

=== Growth and construction ===
In 2023, AHN announced that it would be building a new medical and research headquarters for its Neuroscience Institute on the AGH campus; in the same year, the network also unveiled its 10-year master plan for AGH. In November 2023, AHN announced it would be building a new full-service hospital near Canonsburg, Pa.

In 2025, AHN launched the first phase of its AGH expansion.

== Notable Institutes ==
Like many health systems, AHN delivers patient care at hospitals and outpatient centers, but manages and organizes that care through service-line-oriented institutes. As of 2018, AHN's highest-volume and best-known institutes include its Cancer Institute, Cardiovascular Institute, Emergency Medicine Institute, Esophageal & Lung Institute, Medicine Institute, Neuroscience Institute, Orthopaedic Institute, Transplant Institute, Women's Institute, and its Pediatric Institute.

== Notable researchers, physicians and surgeons ==
Numerous renowned physicians, surgeons, and researchers have been affiliated with Allegheny Health Network and its member hospitals over the years, including: George J. Magovern, a pioneering cardiothoracic researcher and one of the nation's most influential heart surgeons, who developed the first suture-less heart valve, performed the world's second lung transplant in 1963, and performed one of the world's first heart transplants; Peter Jannetta, who was one of the world's foremost neurosurgeons and who developed a new brain procedure to eliminate facial spasms and facial pain caused by trigeminal neuralgia; Milton Jena, a distinguished cancer researcher who established one of the region's first cancer labs; Donald Fisher, a cardiologist who established the region's first cardiac catheterization lab and performed one of the world's first heart defibrillations; John "Jack" Gaisford, a surgeon who founded Western Pennsylvania's first specialized burn center; James McMaster, a leading orthopaedic surgeon and sports medicine specialist, and past president of the Allegheny-Singer Research Institute; Yvonne Maher, one of the region's first female interventional cardiologists; Claude Joyner Jr., whose landmark 1963 article, "Reflected Ultrasound in the Assessment of Mitral Valve Disease," introduced echocardiography to the United States; Ralph R. Mellon, the director of the Institute of Pathology at West Penn Hospital through the 1930s and 1940s, and one of first doctors in the world to use sulfas (a synthetic antibiotic) to treat pneumonia and other bacterial infections; and George J. Magovern, Jr., retired cardiothoracic surgeon who built the heart transplant program at AGH and in 1987 performed the hospital’s first heart transplant.

== Sports Medicine ==
Allegheny Health Network serves as the official medical provider of the Pittsburgh Pirates, the Pittsburgh Riverhounds, and various regional high school and collegiate athletic programs. The network also has three large sports-medicine campuses — AHN Cool Springs, AHN Montour, and AHN Pavilion Sports Medicine + Performance in Erie, which opened in May 2024.

== Financials ==
Allegheny Health Network reported $5.7 billion in revenue for the full year ending Dec. 31, 2025, with an operating income of $90 million, driven by volume growth and operational improvements.

In 2024, the network reported a $147 million operating loss against $5.1 billion in operating revenue. In 2023, the network reported $173 million in operating losses against $4.7 billion in operating revenue. In 2022, AHN reported nearly $181 million in operating losses against $4.4 billion in total revenue, according to bond filings. In 2021, AHN reported a $119 million operating loss and more than $4 billion in operating revenue. In 2020, AHN reported a $169 million operating loss, attributable to the suspension of patient visits and surgical procedures and increased supply costs necessitated by the COVID-19 pandemic.

== Predecessor organizations ==
=== West Penn Allegheny Health System (WPAHS) ===
West Penn Allegheny Health System was a five-hospital, Pittsburgh-based network formed through the merger of West Penn Hospital and the Pittsburgh-area assets of the Allegheny Health, Education and Research Foundation, which included Allegheny General, Forbes, Canonsburg, Suburban, and Allegheny Valley hospitals.

The merger occurred in 1999, following the collapse of AHERF, and the health system struggled to maintain market share in Allegheny County and beyond. In the ensuing years, WPAHS lost market share to its rival UPMC, and WPAHS's relationship with Highmark Inc., the region's largest health insurer, also deteriorated: In April 2009, WPAHS filed an anti-trust suit against both Highmark and UPMC, “alleging that Highmark and UPMC illegally raised prices for local health consumers while trying to ‘destroy’ West Penn Allegheny. The suit detailed actions by the two going back to 2002 that it said were designed to assure Highmark's ongoing dominance in the local insurance market while establishing higher payment rates and eliminating West Penn Allegheny to benefit UPMC.”

Two years after that lawsuit was filed, WPAHS's finances had further deteriorated, and WPAHS's board was contemplating a menu of options to rescue the distressed system. Eventually, WPAHS entered into negotiations with Highmark Inc. regarding the full acquisition of the health system by the health insurer. Highmark agreed to the rescue, in part because a Highmark was at a contract impasse with UPMC that imperiled its customers' future access to UPMC facilities.

In June 2011, the boards that led Highmark Inc. and West Penn Allegheny Health System announced a “capital partnership” in which Highmark would invest $475 million in WPAHS, including an upfront $50 million payment that kept the doors open at West Penn Hospital. In 2013, the proposed acquisition became official. West Penn Allegheny Health System continues to exist as a legal entity, but as of 2013 it has been fully absorbed into the larger Allegheny Health Network, which is owned by parent company Highmark Health.

=== Allegheny Health, Education, and Research Foundation (AHERF) ===
AHERF was created in 1983, as a nonprofit corporation that operated Allegheny General Hospital. Under Chief Operating Officer Sherif Abdelhak, AHERF and its board embarked on an ambitious growth campaign, expanding rapidly “into both Philadelphia and Pittsburgh through acquisitions encompassing several hospitals, medical schools, and primary care physicians.”

In 1987, AHERF acquired the Medical College of Pennsylvania and its two affiliated hospitals in Philadelphia; in 1991 it acquired United Hospitals Inc., a system of four hospitals in Philadelphia; in 1993 it acquired Hahnemann Medical College and its affiliated hospital in Philadelphia; and in 1997, AHERF formed Allegheny University Medical Centers to operate AHERF's new Pittsburgh-area affiliates (Forbes Hospital, Allegheny Valley Hospital and Canonsburg Hospital).

By the end of 1997 AHERF had transformed itself from a sole urban hospital into Pennsylvania's largest statewide integrated health and education system. But the rapid expansion came at a great cost, and soon AHERF was unable to meet debt obligations and keep up with capital improvement demands; health system leadership permitted “internal subsidies, hidden internal cash transfers and raids on hospital endowments.” The rapid financial deterioration meant that by spring of 1998, AHERF was losing nearly a million dollars a day. In July 1998, AHERF filed for bankruptcy, and the resulting $1.3 billion protection filing was the nation's largest nonprofit health care failure to date.

The subsequent collapse of AHERF and the break-up of its assets led to the creation of the West Penn Allegheny Health System.
