= Blue Cross and Blue Shield of Kansas City =

American healthcare insurer

- Type: Not-for-Profit
- Industry: Health Insurance
- Founded: 1938
- Headquarters: Kansas City, Missouri
- Area served: Kansas City metropolitan area
- Key people: Erin Stucky (President and CEO)
- Number of employees: 1,000 (2018)
- Website: bluekc.com

Blue Cross and Blue Shield of Kansas City (Blue KC) is an independent licensee of the Blue Cross Blue Shield Association and an affiliate of Pittsburgh-based Highmark, a not-for-profit health insurance provider with more than eight million members. Founded in 1938, Blue KC offers healthcare, dental, life insurance and Medicare coverage. Headquartered in Kansas City, Missouri, the company serves 30 counties in northwest Missouri, and Johnson and Wyandotte counties in Kansas.

== History ==
Originally named Blue Cross of Kansas City, the health insurance provider was established in 1938. Kansas City Blue Shield was formed in 1943. In 1982, the Kansas City Blue Cross and Blue Shield Plans merged, creating Blue Cross and Blue Shield of Kansas City.

In 2003, Kansas Insurance Commissioner Sandy Praeger denied a bid from Anthem (the fifth-largest US publicly traded health insurance company at the time) to purchase the company. Both companies sought legal recourse, arguing that the insurance commissioner had over-stepped the authority of the office. The Kansas Supreme Court heard the case and ruled that the state insurance commissioner has the authority to block such mergers and affirmed her ability to do so. Prior to the proposed merger, the company had lost 80,000 policy holders.

From 2014 to 2018, Blue KC participated in the Affordable Care Act exchange. The company withdrew from the exchange in 2017 after reporting a $100 million loss. In 2015, the company created the Blue KC Exchange, a private insurance exchange marketplace for small businesses. Danette Wilson became the Blue KC's first female CEO in 2015. When she retired in 2019, Erin Stucky, a 25-year veteran of the company, succeeded her in the role.

In November 2017, Blue KC launched Spira Care, a plan that combines primary care and health insurance.

On March 17, 2026, Blue KC became an affiliate of Pittsburgh-based Highmark, making Highmark the third-largest BCBS-affiliated organization in the United States.
