= Aq Qaleh, Markazi =

Aq Qaleh اق قلعه
- Village
- Location within Iran
- Coordinates: 35°11′14″N 49°35′37″E
- Country: Iran
- Province: Markazi
- County: Saveh
- Bakhsh: Nowbaran
- Rural District: Kuhpayeh

Population (2006)
  - Total: 69
- Time zone: UTC+3:30 (IRST)
  - Summer (DST): UTC+4:30 (IRDT)

Aq Qaleh (Persian: اق قلعه, also Romanized as Āq Qal‘eh) is a village in Kuhpayeh Rural District, Nowbaran District, Saveh County, Markazi Province, Iran. At the 2006 census, its population was 69, in 30 families.
