= Aq Qaleh, Shirvan =

Aq Qaleh اق قلعه
- Village
- Location within Iran
- Coordinates: 37°45′48″N 57°49′53″E
- Country: Iran
- Province: North Khorasan
- County: Shirvan
- Bakhsh: Qushkhaneh
- Rural District: Qushkhaneh-ye Bala

Population (2006)
  - Total: 168
- Time zone: UTC+3:30 (IRST)
  - Summer (DST): UTC+4:30 (IRDT)

Aq Qaleh (Persian: اق قلعه, also Romanized as Āq Qal‘eh) is a village in Qushkhaneh-ye Bala Rural District, Qushkhaneh District, Shirvan County, North Khorasan Province, Iran. At the 2006 census, its population was 168, in 42 families.
