= Ágh =

Ágh is a Hungarian surname. Notable people with the surname include:

- Adalbert Agh (born 1945), Romanian rower
- István Agh (1709–1786), Hungarian Unitarian bishop
- István Ágh (poet) (1938–2025), Hungarian poet
- István Ágh (sport shooter) (born 1970), Hungarian sport shooter
- Norbert Ágh (born 1970), Hungarian swimmer
- Olivér Ágh (born 1975), Hungarian swimmer
- Péter Ágh (born 1982), Hungarian politician
