= AGHS =

AGHS may refer to:

== Education ==
- Albert Gallatin High School, Uniontown, Pennsylvania, US
- Allen Glen High School, Roodepoort, Gauteng, South Africa
- Allerton Grange School, Leeds, England
- Arroyo Grande High School, Arroyo Grande, California, US
- Ashland-Greenwood High School, Ashland, Nebraska, US
- Asquith Girls High School, Sydney, New South Wales, Australia
- Auburn Girls High School, Auburn, New South Wales, Australia
- Avon Grove High School, West Grove, Pennsylvania, US
- Avonside Girls' High School, Christchurch, Canterbury, New Zealand
- Ayden-Grifton High School, Ayden, North Carolina, US

== Organizations ==
- AGHS Legal Aid Cell, non-governmental organization (NGO) in Pakistan
- Akron General Health System, in Akron, Ohio, US
- Australian Garden History Society

== Other uses ==
- Hull classification symbol, used by the US Navy for "patrol combatant support ship"
- AgHS, the chemical equation for silver hydrosulfide
