= Canonsburg Hospital =

Coordinates: 40.24694°N 80.19118°W

Geography
- Location: North Strabane Township, Pennsylvania, United States

Organization
- Type: Non-profit
- Network: Allegheny Health Network

Services
- Beds: 104

Helipads
- Helipad: Yes

History
- Founded: 1904

Links
- Lists: Hospitals in Pennsylvania

Canonsburg Hospital, part of the Allegheny Health Network of Pittsburgh, United States, is a community hospital located just outside Canonsburg, Pennsylvania in North Strabane Township.

== History ==
=== 20th century ===
It was founded in 1904, when, according to the Pittsburgh Post-Gazette, “the Women's Shakespeare Club of Canonsburg solicited donations of ‘linens, supplies, a hen and brood of chickens and a generous supply of fruit’ for what turned out to be an ambitious if not unusual project for a literary club. ... [But], as history records, this Women's Shakespeare Club's project ended well and proved to be much ado about something pretty special: medical care. For what the Women's Shakespeare Club of Canonsburg started [was] Canonsburg General Hospital.”

The club raised $2,000 to help buy a house on Barr Street in Canonsburg, which served as the hospital for 10 years. They also formed the Canonsburg General Hospital Association to oversee the hospital’s operations. The hospital opened at its original Barr Street location on Oct. 17, 1904, and the first patient was a woman who was “traveling with her husband in a horse and carriage from the village of Midland in Chartiers to Canonsburg when the berserk horse sent them flying.”

The following year, the hospital opened a nursing school, which remained in operation until 1960. In 1913, the hospital board agreed to construct a new hospital building, also on Barr Street, which grew to 54 beds by 1930. The “new” Barr Street hospital eventually named its dining room after the singer Perry Como, who was born in Canonsburg in 1912.

By the late 1970s, Canonsburg Hospital had outgrown its red-brick Barr Street home, and in 1979 the hospital applied to the Pennsylvania Department of Health to build a new hospital. At the time in Pennsylvania, new hospital construction had to be approved by the state through a “certificate of need.” The application for a certificate of need was initially rejected by the state on the grounds that existing hospitals in the area had enough capacity to handle projected patient volume, but Canonsburg-area residents lobbied then-Pennsylvania Gov. Dick Thornburgh with “more than 5,000 letters [and] 2,000 mail-grams demanding the department approve the project.”

In 1981, the Health Department issued a certificate of need, and a new hospital was built in North Strabane Township, just outside of Canonsburg borough. The new $15.8 million hospital opened May 14, 1983, on 31 acres; the former Barr Street hospital is now a personal care and retirement home.

=== 21st century ===
In 2000, Canonsburg Hospital joined the former West Penn Allegheny Health System. In 2013, it became a part of Allegheny Health Network. The current 104-bed inpatient facility has undergone several expansions since its 1983 opening: In 1996, a new ambulatory care center was opened; in 2003, the physical therapy department was enlarged; in 2006, the emergency department was expanded to accommodate increased patient volume; and since its affiliation with AHN in 2013, the hospital has opened a sleep lab.

The hospital primarily serves residents living in Southern Allegheny and Northern Washington counties. Canonsburg annually admits over 4,000 patients and logs approximately 21,000 emergency visits, and performs nearly 3,000 surgeries.
