= Allegheny General Hospital =

- Allegheny Health Network
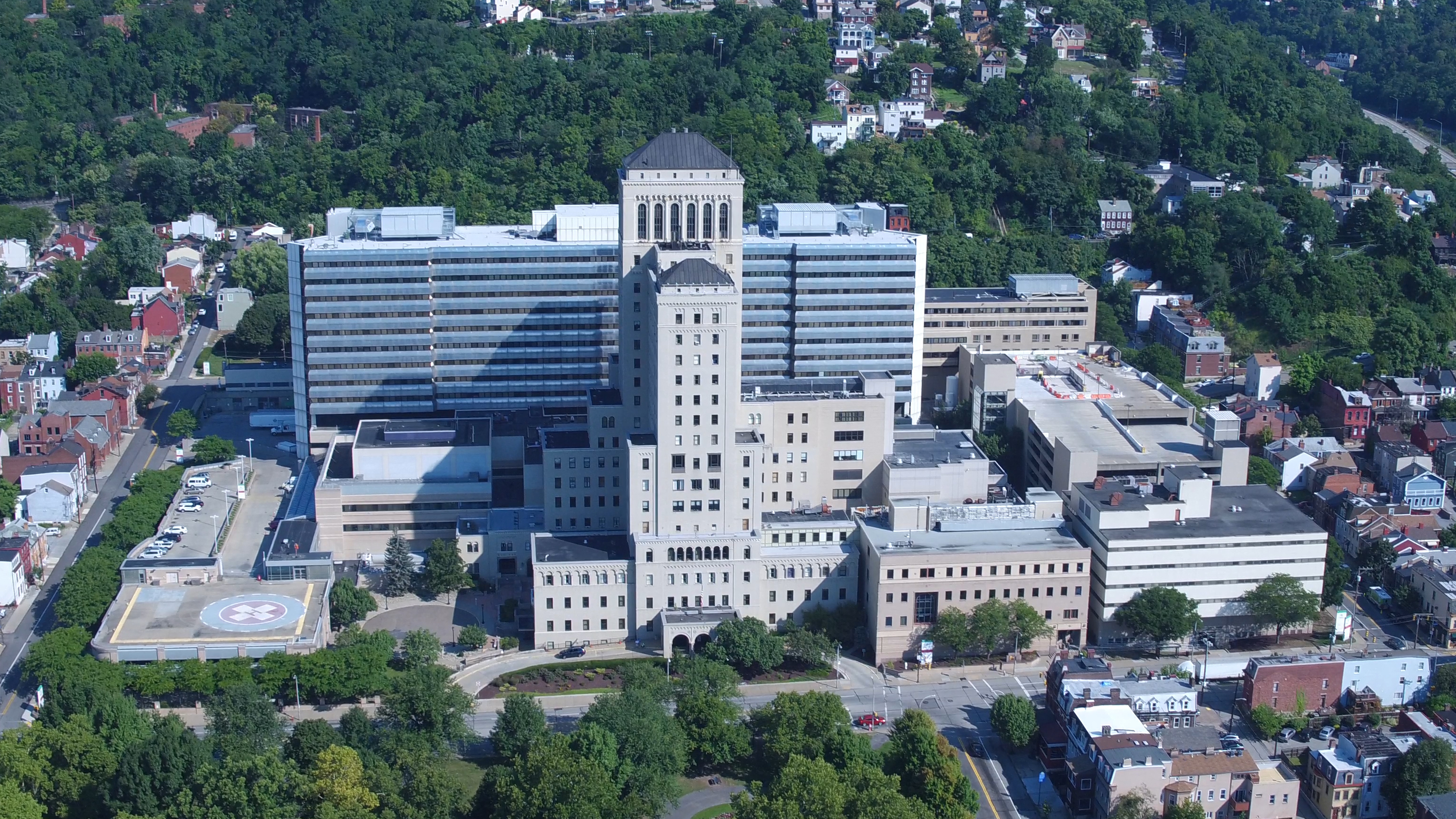

Geography
- Location: 320 East North Avenue, Pittsburgh, Pennsylvania, U.S.
- Coordinates: 40°27′24″N 80°00′12″W

Organisation
- Type: Tertiary and Quaternary care
- Affiliated university: Duquesne University College of Osteopathic Medicine; Drexel University College of Medicine; Temple University School of Medicine; Lake Erie College of Osteopathic Medicine

Services
- Emergency department: Level I Trauma Center
- Beds: 576

Helipads
- Helipad: FAA LID: 42PN
Number	Length		Surface
Number	ft	m	Surface
H1	65	20	Concrete

History
- Founded: 1882

Links
- Lists: Hospitals in U.S.

Pittsburgh Landmark – PHLF
- Designated: 2002

Allegheny General Hospital is a large urban hospital located at 320 East North Avenue in Pittsburgh, Pennsylvania. It is part of the larger Allegheny Health Network.

== History ==
Allegheny General Hospital, also known locally by the acronym "AGH", is located in the Central Northside neighborhood of Pittsburgh. AGH was the first hospital in Pennsylvania to be designated as a Level 1 shock trauma center. It was also the first hospital in the northeastern United States to offer an aeromedical service.

Now the academic flagship of the Allegheny Health Network, Allegheny General serves as a clinical campus for medical schools including The Duquesne University Nasuti College of Osteopathic Medicine. Allegheny General Hospital began as a 50-bed infirmary, housed in two adjoining brick rowhouses in what was then Allegheny City, immediately north of Pittsburgh. Starting in 1881, the mayor of Allegheny City began meeting with a committee of physicians and prominent residents of Allegheny City to discuss the construction of, and fund-raising for, a new North Side hospital. Three years later, the committee bought two adjacent properties along Stockton Avenue.

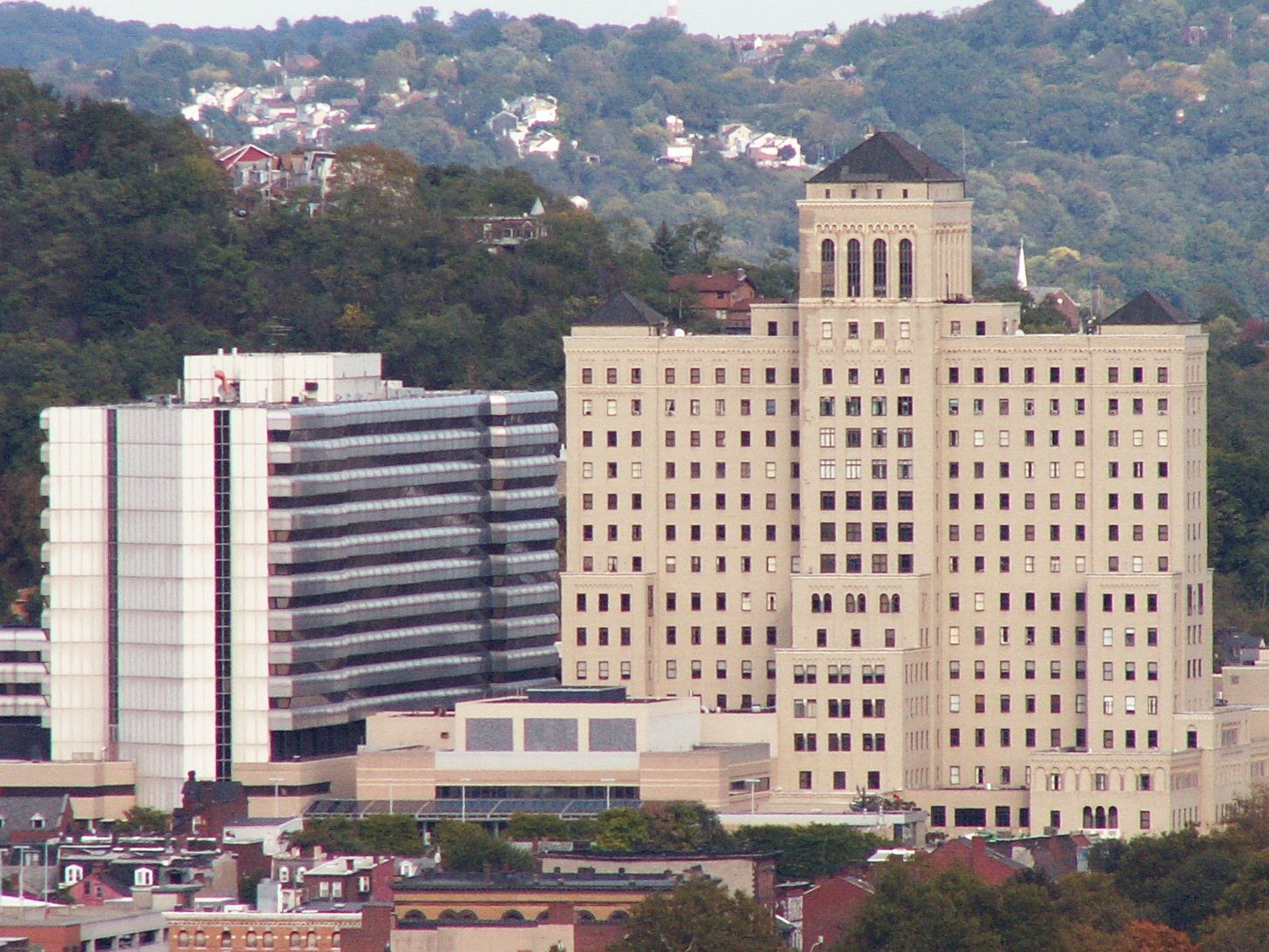
Allegheny General Hospital from West End Overlook

The hospital was chartered in 1882, and on February 15, 1886, the forerunner to today's Allegheny General Hospital opened its doors. In 1887, the hospital established a children's wing, and in 1889, an ambulance was donated to the hospital; AGH would operate its own ambulance service for the next 64 years. At the turn of the century, the hospital's directors began collecting funds for a new AGH, to be built just a block away, also along Stockton Avenue.

The seven-story, 400-bed facility cost $620,000 and opened in 1904. The new space included more modern laboratory facilities: separate rooms for urinalysis, blood work, bacteriology, and autopsies.

In 1920, hospital leaders began looking for a new home. New York architecture firm York and Sawyer was hired to draw plans for what would be one of the nation's first "skyscraper" hospitals, and by 1929, construction was underway, just to the north of the Stockton Avenue location. The cornerstone was laid in 1930, but the Great Depression interrupted construction for several years. The 22-story hospital was completed in 1936.

Over the years, the hospital expanded, with a new East Wing added. In 1981, a new inpatient tower, the $104 million Snyder Pavilion, was completed.

Allegheny General is its highest-volume educational hospital, featuring a 576-bed quaternary care and educational hospital for 24,000 inpatient admissions, 23,000 surgeries, and nearly 56,000 emergency department visits each year.

Since 2025, the exterior of Allegheny General has appeared in HBO's The Pitt as the fictional Pittsburgh Trauma Medical Center.

== See also ==
- Western Pennsylvania Hospital
