= Polish Hill =

Neighborhood in Pennsylvania, US

- Neighborhood of Pittsburgh
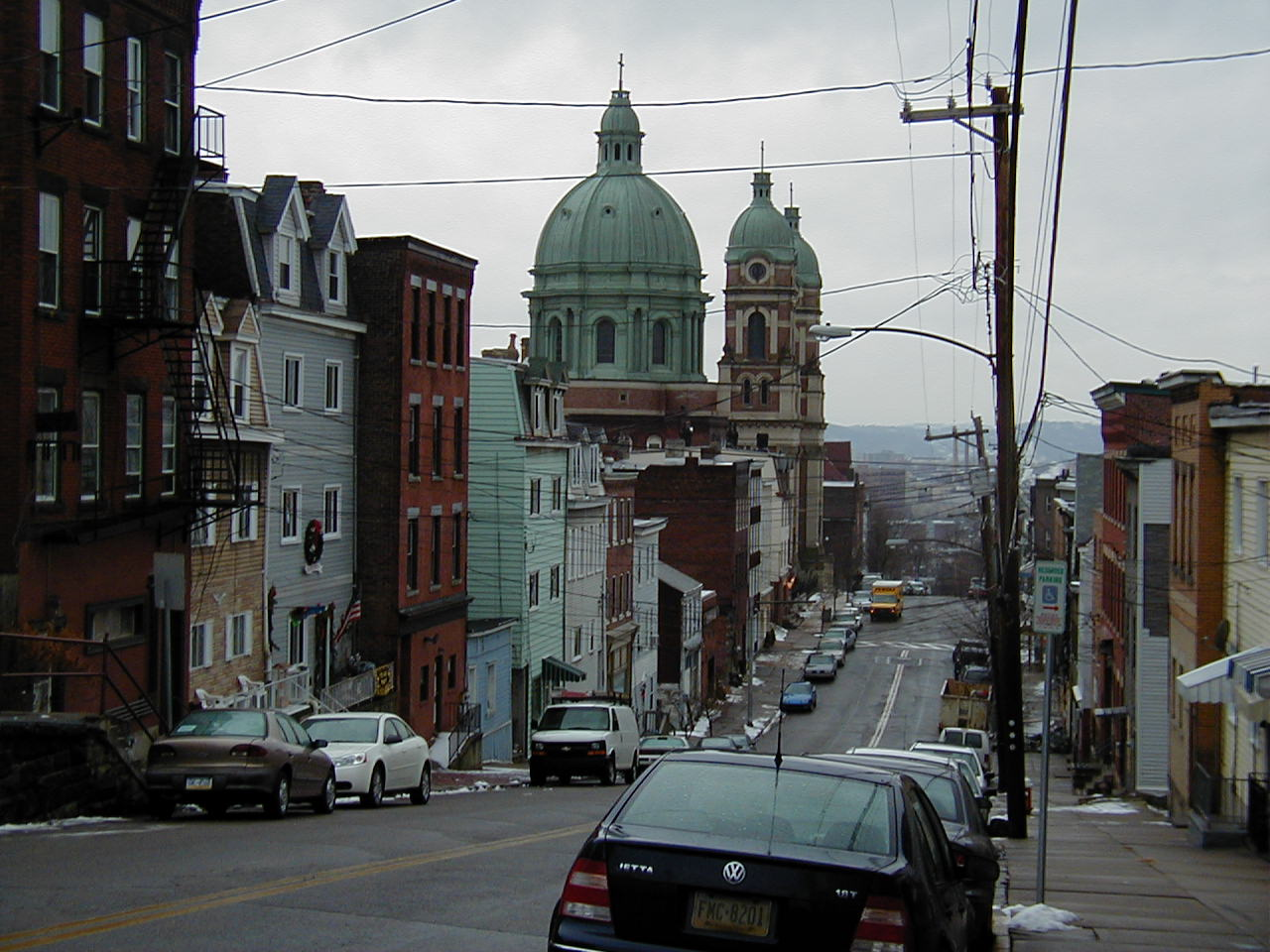
- Immaculate Heart of Mary Church

- Coordinates: 40.457°N 79.965°W
- Country: United States
- State: Pennsylvania
- County: Allegheny County
- City: Pittsburgh

Area
  - Total: 0.255 sq mi (0.66 km^{2})

Population (2010)
  - Total: 1,274
  - Density: 5,000/sq mi (1,930/km^{2})

Polish Hill (Polish: Polskie Wzgórze) is a neighborhood in Pittsburgh, Pennsylvania. Primarily a residential area, it is home to Pittsburgh's Immaculate Heart of Mary church.

== History ==
Large numbers of Polish immigrants settled the neighborhood after the mid 1800s. They were attracted to the many jobs in Pittsburgh's burgeoning steel industry, which immigrants could perform even before learning much English. After World War II, construction of highways were supported by the federal government, and new residential areas were developed in the suburbs. Polish Hill and other neighborhoods began to lose population as some of its more established residents joined the suburban and white flight movement, a process seen in many established cities in the US. At the same time, Polish Hill has many residents who are the descendants of non-Polish immigrants and is attracting new residents who value its scale, walkability, and proximity to jobs and amenities.

== Surrounding Pittsburgh neighborhoods ==
Polish Hill has five borders with the Pittsburgh neighborhoods of Lower Lawrenceville to the north, North Oakland to the southeast, Upper Hill District to the south, Bedford Dwellings to the southwest and the Strip District to the west and northwest. Polish Hill also runs catty-corner (without a direct border) with Bloomfield to the east with its meeting point at the center of the Bloomfield Bridge.

== Government ==
Polish Hill has representation on the Pittsburgh City Council by the council member for District 7. It is within Pittsburgh's 6th ward.

== City Steps ==
The Polish Hill neighborhood has 16 distinct flights of city steps, many of which are open and in a safe condition. In Polish Hill, the steps quickly connect pedestrians to public transportation and provide an easy way to travel through this densely populated area.

== Gallery ==
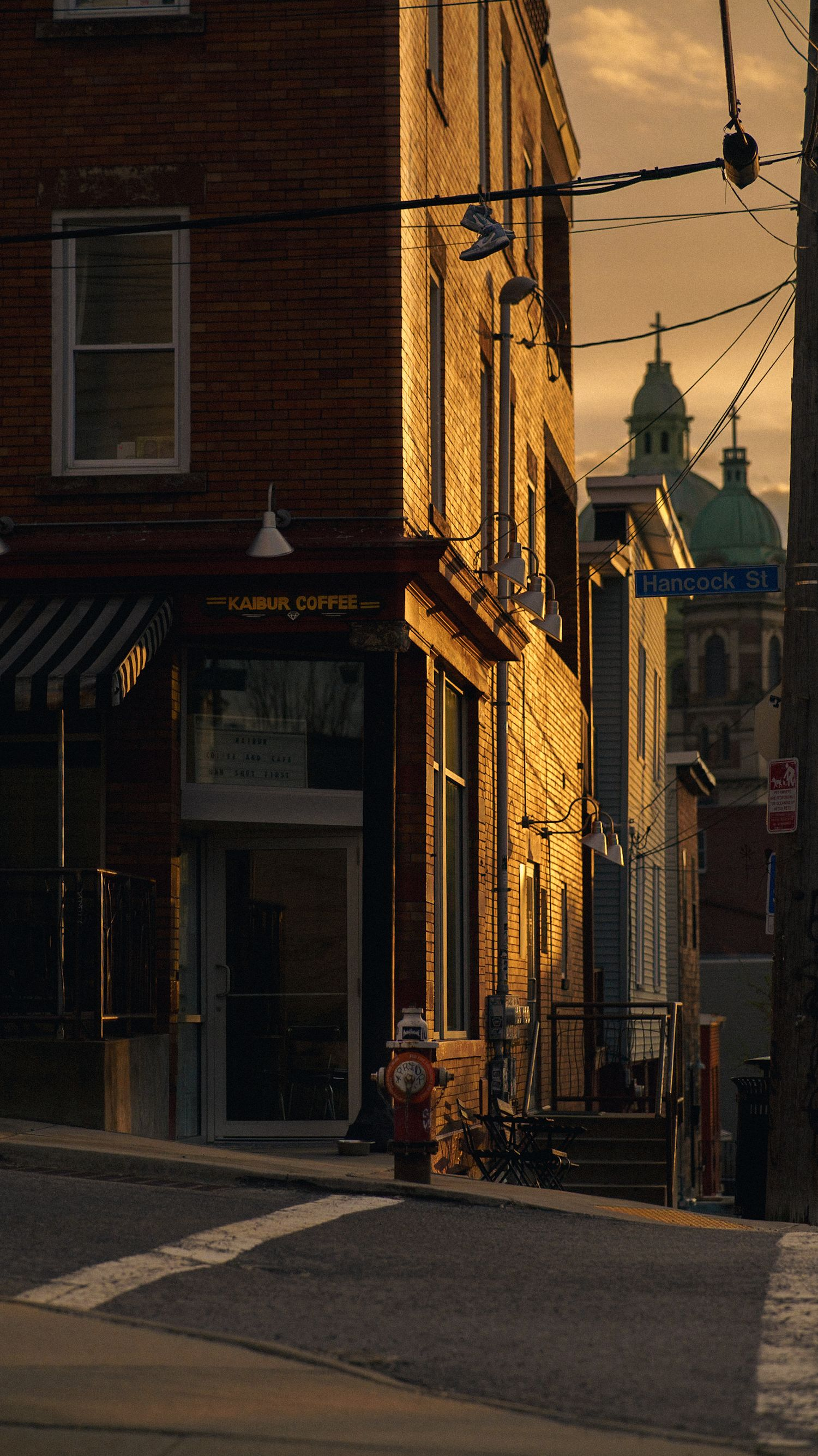

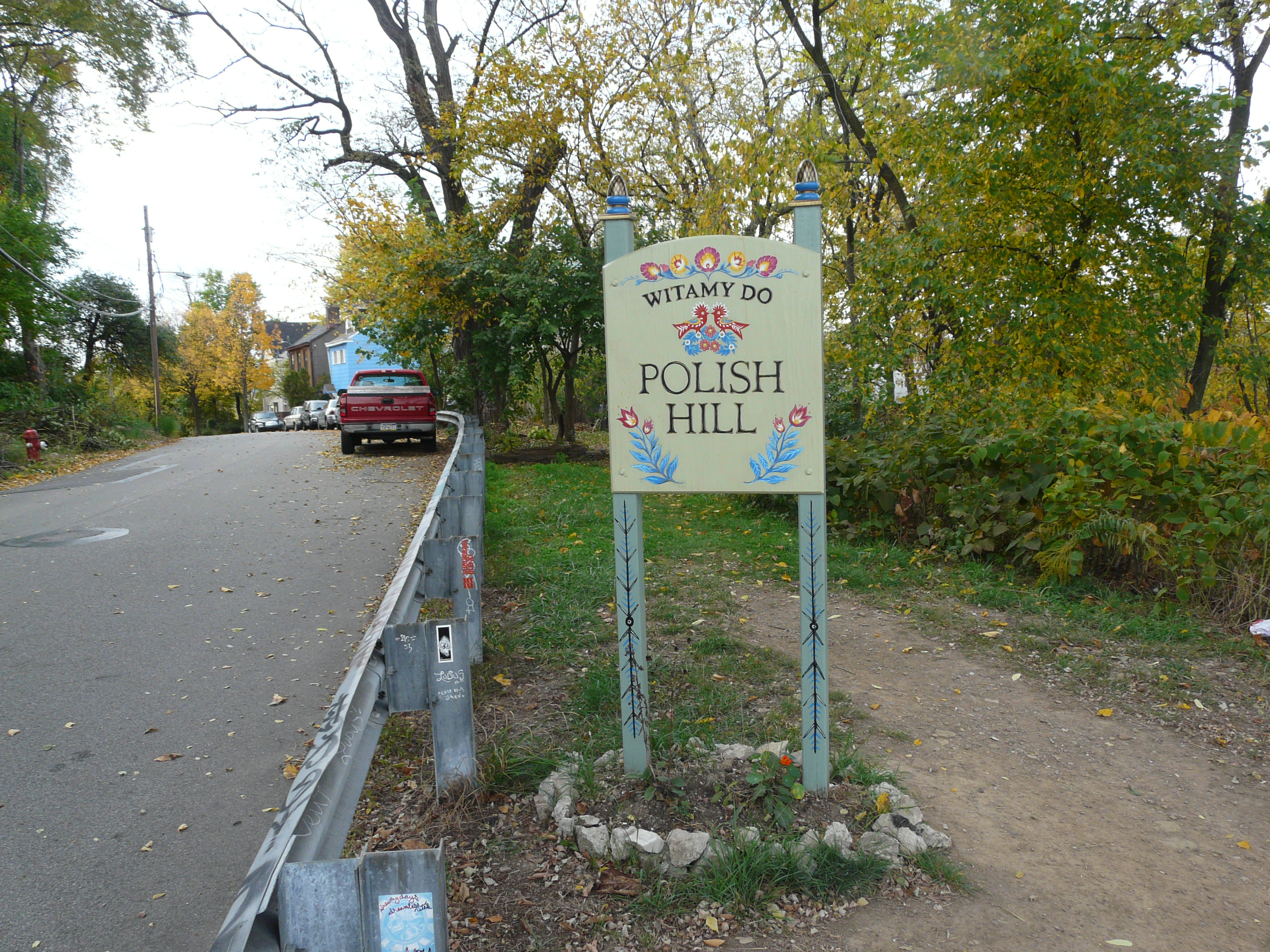

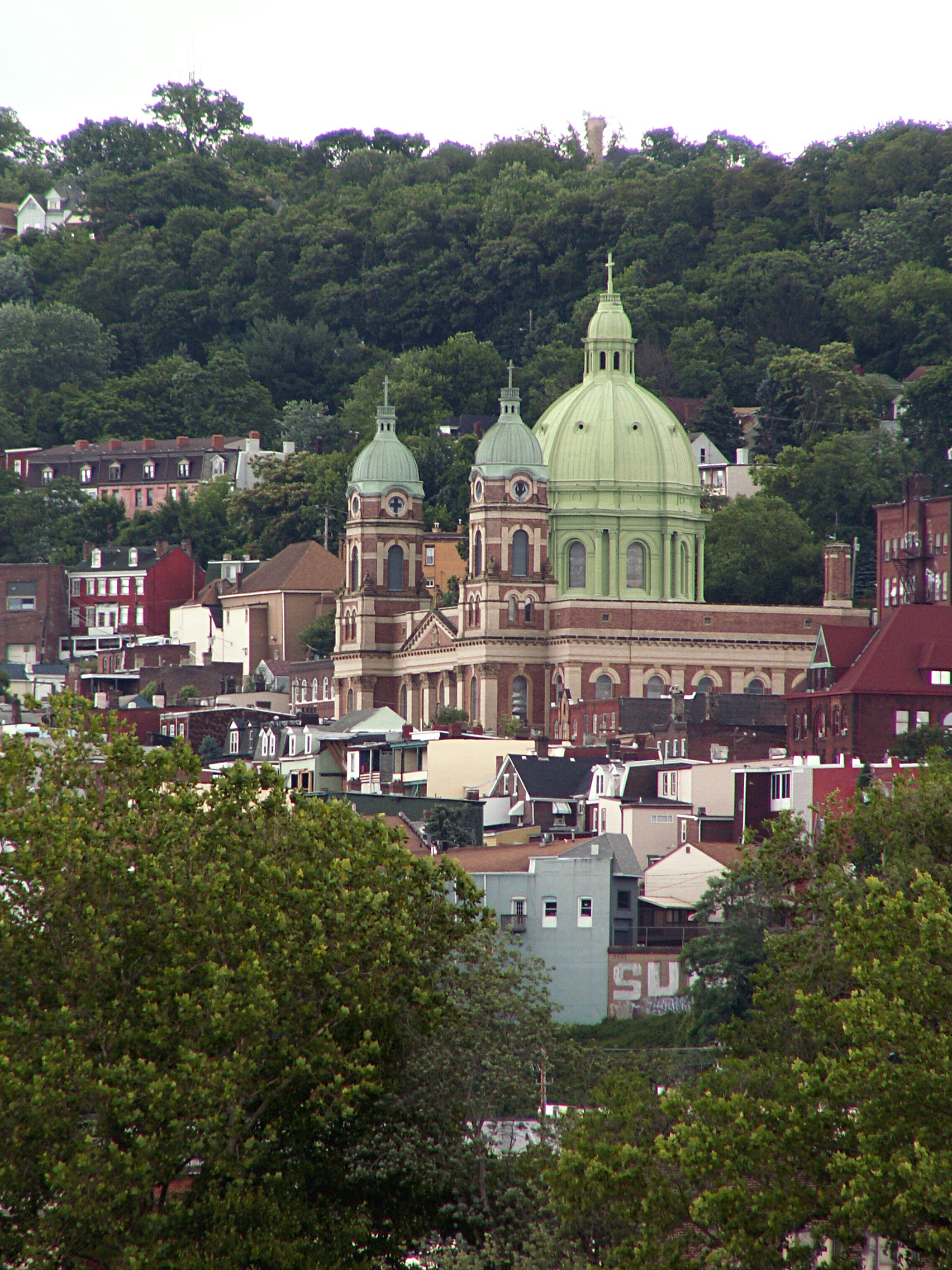

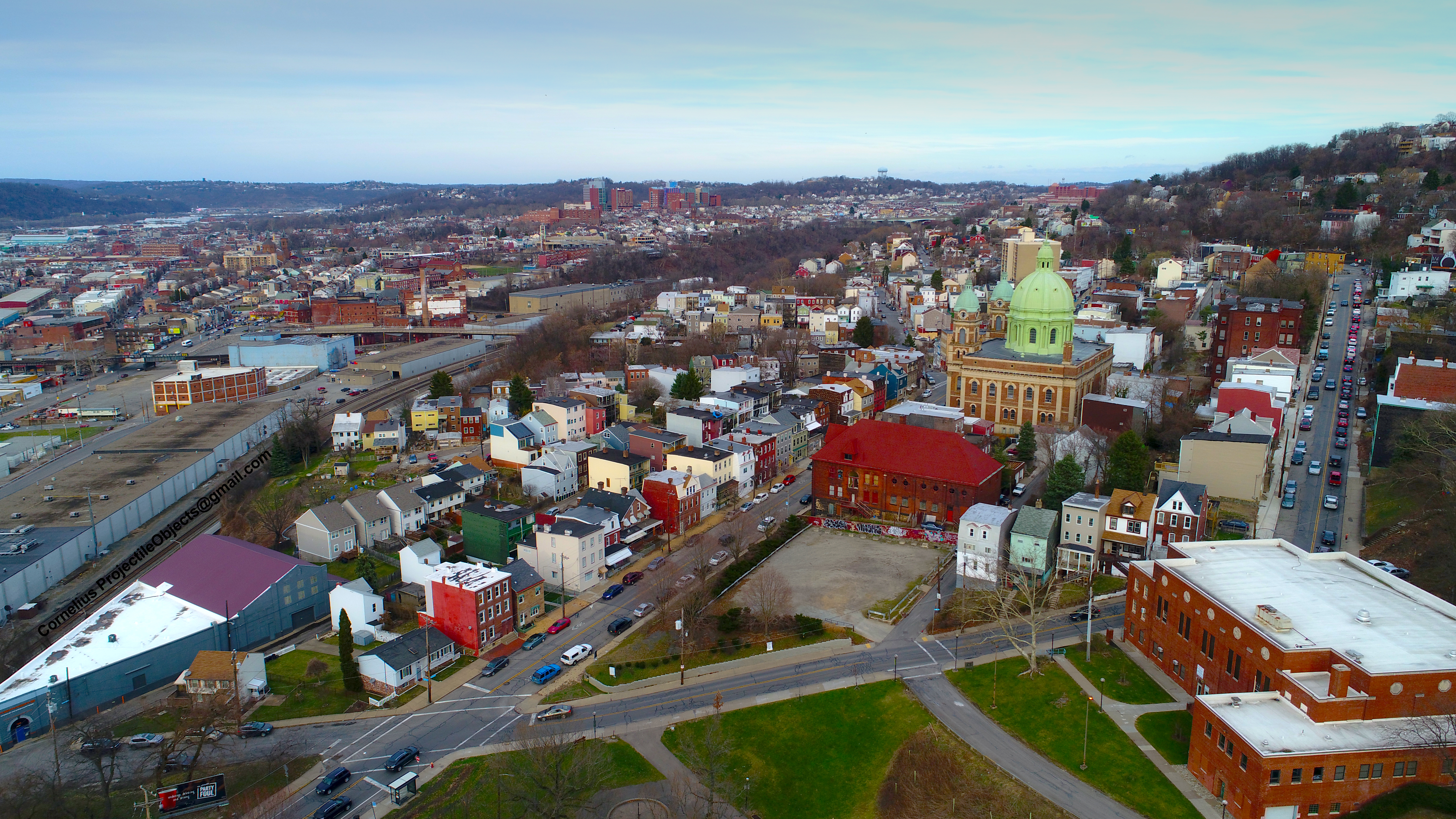

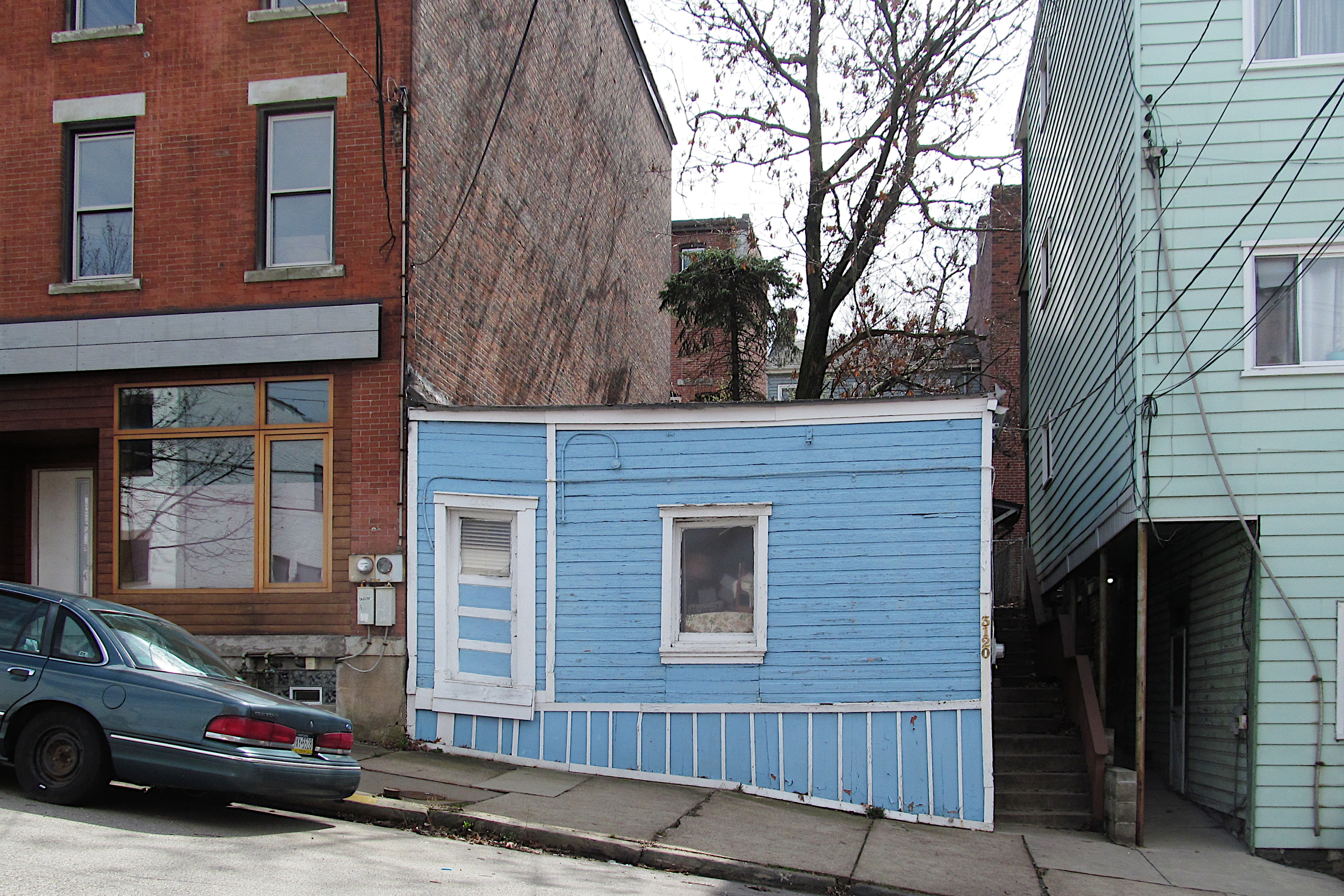

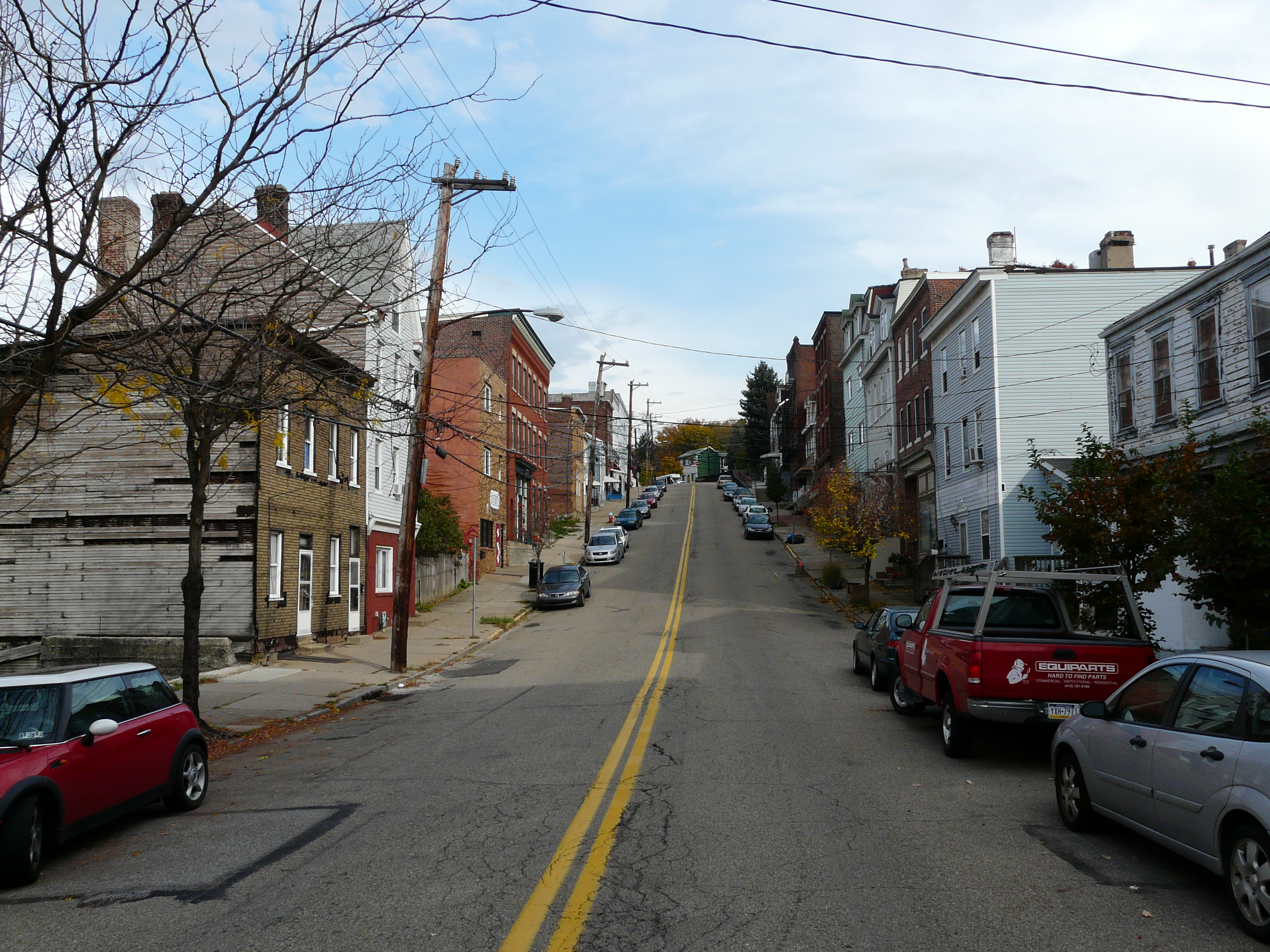

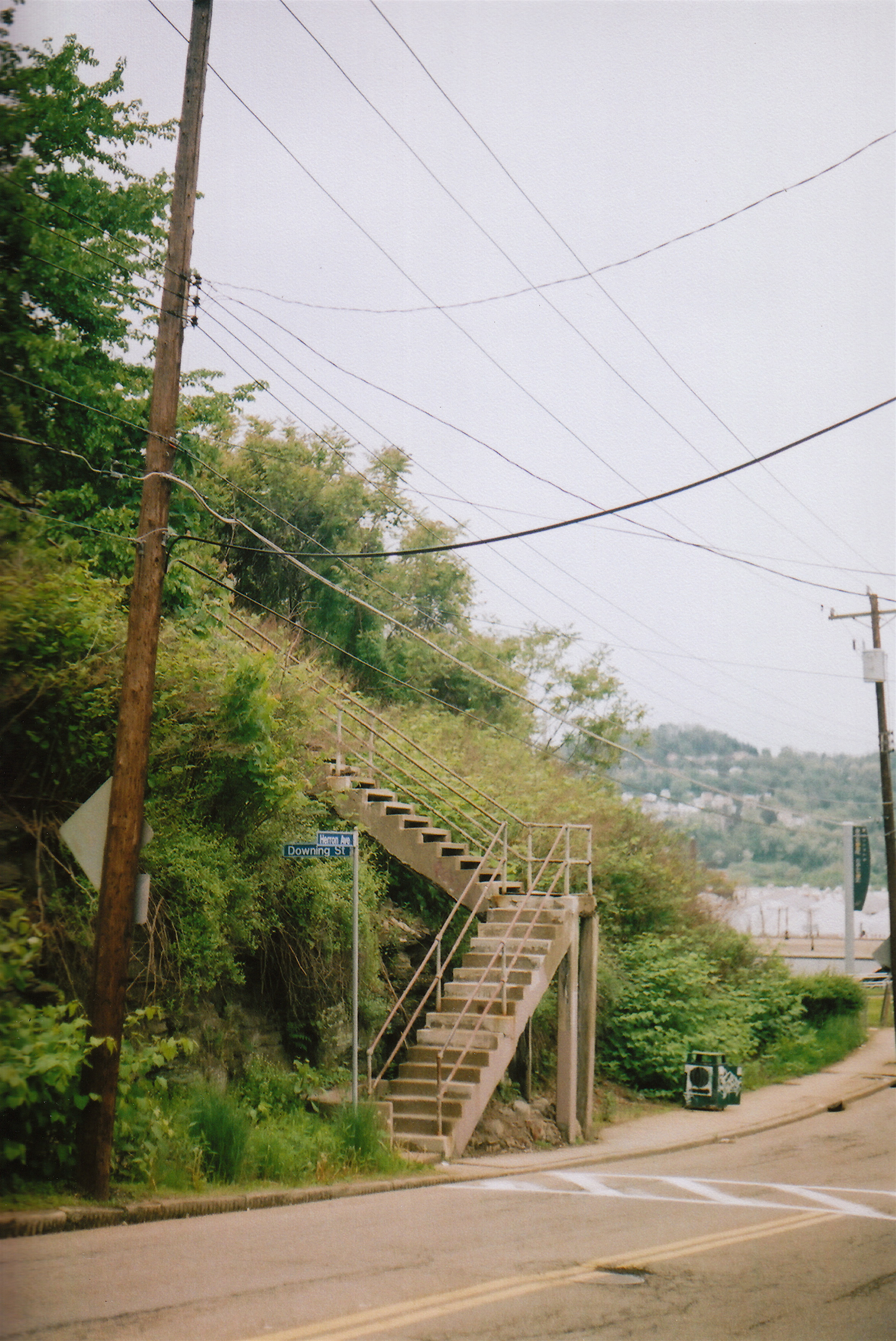

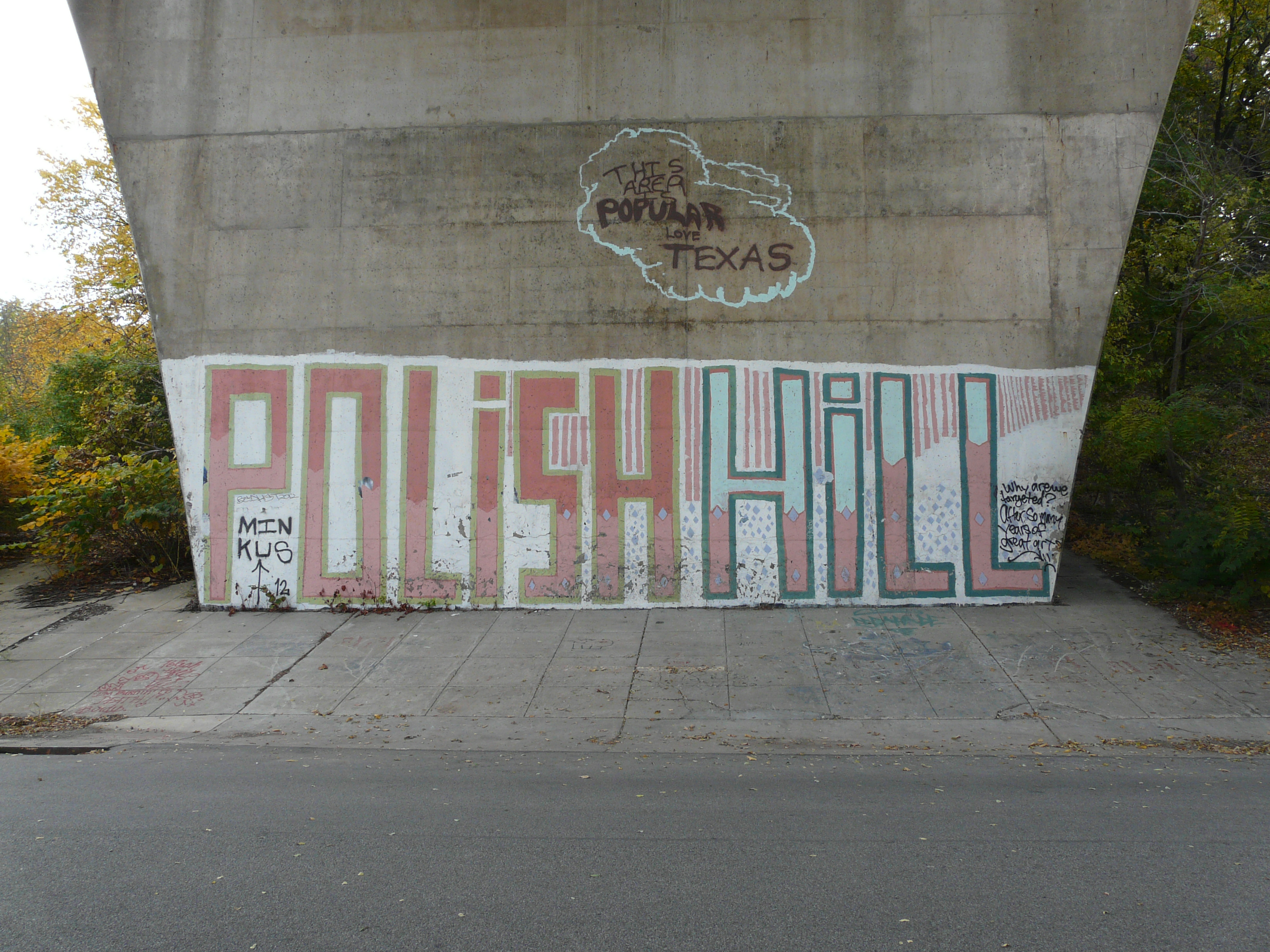
