= BCBST =

BCBST may refer to:

- BlueCross BlueShield of Tennessee
- Blue Cross Blue Shield Tower
