= Dwight Takamine =

American politician

Dwight Y. Takamine

Hawaii Director of Labor and Industrial Relations
- In office 2011–2014

Member of the Hawaii Senate from the 1st district
- In office 2008–2010
- Preceded by: Lorraine Inouye
- Succeeded by: Malama Solomon

Member of the Hawaii House of Representatives from the 1st district
- In office 1984–2008
- Preceded by: Yoshito Takamine
- Succeeded by: Mark Nakashima

Personal details
- Born: January 29, 1953 (age 73) Honokaʻa, Territory of Hawaii, US
- Party: Democratic
- Education: University of Hawaiʻi at Mānoa
- Profession: Attorney

Dwight Yoshito Takamine (born January 29, 1953) is an Okinawan-American Hawaii state senator and state representative (1984–2007). A Democrat, he represents the first district on the island of Hawaii.

== Early life and education ==
Takamine, the eldest of five children, was born January 29, 1953, and raised in the plantation community of Honokaʻa to Yoshito and Kimiko Takamine. Yoshito Takamine served in the Hawaii State House of Representatives from 1959 to 1984. Takamine attended Honokaʻa Elementary School and Honokaʻa High School where he excelled both athletically and scholastically. In 1971, Takamine graduated High School as class valedictorian. Takamine went on to earn a bachelor's degree in psychology while participating in the ethnic studies program at the University of Hawaiʻi at Mānoa. Takamine subsequently studied law at the University of Hawaiʻi and received his law degree from the William S. Richardson School of Law in 1978.

== Career ==
After graduating, Takamine began practicing law in Honolulu. In 1983, he opened his own law office in Hilo, Hawaii as his father Yoshito Takamine resigned after 26 years in the Hawaii House of Representatives. The younger Takamine took his father's seat in 1984. Takamine maintains a house in Laupahoehoe but usually lives in Honolulu with his second wife who is a school official there. He has continued to practice labor law, focusing on workers' compensation cases. On behalf of the ILWU, whose ties to the Takamines go back decades, Takamine has pushed a lumber mill in Oʻokala, and a wood-burning power plant in Paʻauilo. Local residents are against both proposals. Takamine and his father played a key role in the controversial 1980s Kamehameha Schools (formerly Bishop Estate) decision to buy the Hamakua Sugar Company lands and then plant them in eucalyptus.

Since 1984, Takamine served as the State Representative for the Big Island's 1st District until 2007 when he was elected as the State Senator for District 1. During one campaign he "went to bat" at the century-old local Kalanianaole Elementary and Middle School located on the Hamakua Coast. With the demise of the jobs of the sugar-cane industry, the school had declined when Takamine stepped in and revived interest. His roles in the legislature as a Representative have included serving as Chair of several committees, notably the Finance Committee from 1998-2006. He was deposed from this position on the Finance Committee during pre-2007-session faction fighting in the Democratic caucus. During the 2006 campaign, Takamine had co-hosted an official Akaka campaign rally at the Honokaa ranch of Larry Mehau. Takamine and numerous other Democratic elected officials and candidates were photographed there by Hawaii Free Press photojournalists.

In this time, different factions were supporting their respective leaders for chair positions. When his faction failed to seat their leader, he was subsequently stripped of his committee chairmanship. He then ran for the Senate seat being vacated by Sen Lorrane Inouye. Dwight Takamine was elected November 4, 2008, as a candidate for the State Senate District 1 which includes Hilo, Hamakua, and Kamuela. His opponent was Republican Ted Hong, a former member of the University of Hawaiʻi Board of Regents and the former state labor negotiator.

Takamine campaigned for President Barack Obama.

== Personal ==
Takamine is married to Carol who has focused her career on early childhood education. They have a blended family and three sons. Galen is a college student currently attending Azusa Pacific University, and Aaron and Trevor are in high school.
