= Kaulana Noa =

American football player (born 1976)

No. 71
- Position: Offensive guard

Personal information
- Born: December 29, 1976 (age 49); Honokaʻa, Hawaii, U.S.
- Listed height: 6 ft 3 in (1.91 m)
- Listed weight: 307 lb (139 kg)

Career information
- High school: Honokaʻa
- College: Hawaii (1995–1999)
- NFL draft: 2000: 4th round, 104th overall pick

Career history
- St. Louis Rams (2000–2001); → Barcelona Dragons (2002); Cleveland Browns (2002)*; Seattle Seahawks (2002)*; Green Bay Packers (2003)*; Detroit Lions (2003)*; Carolina Panthers (2004)*
- * Offseason or practice squad member only

Awards and highlights
- First-team All-WAC (1999); Third-team All-American (1999)

Kaulana Ronald Noa (born December 29, 1976) is an American former professional football offensive guard. He was selected by the St. Louis Rams in the fourth round of the 2000 NFL draft after playing college football at Hawaii.

== Early life ==
Kaulana Ronald Noa was born on December 29, 1976, in Honokaʻa, Hawaii. He attended Honokaa High & Elementary School.

== College career ==
Noa played college football for the Hawaii Rainbow Warriors of the University of Hawaiʻi at Mānoa. He redshirted the 1995 season, and was then a four-year letterman and four-year starter at offensive tackle from 1996 to 1999. As a senior in 1999, Noa earned first-team All-Western Athletic Conference and third-team All-American honors. He started 49 consecutive games during his college career.

== Professional career ==
Pre-draft measurables
Height	Weight	40-yard dash	10-yard split	20-yard split	20-yard shuttle	Three-cone drill	Vertical jump	Broad jump	Bench press
6 ft 3 5/8 in (1.92 m)	317 lb (144 kg)	5.35 s	1.84 s	3.06 s	4.74 s	7.82 s	25 1/2 in (0.65 m)	8 ft 2 in (2.49 m)	27 reps
All from NFL Combine.

Noa was selected by the St. Louis Rams in the fourth round, with the 104th overall pick, of the 2000 NFL draft. He officially signed with the team on July 12. He was placed on injured reserve on August 16, 2000, and spent the entire season there. Noa was on the team's active roster in 2001 but listed as an inactive for all 16 games. On December 12, 2001, it was reported that Noa was second on the Rams' depth chart at left guard. In 2002, he was allocated to NFL Europe to play for the Barcelona Dragons. He played in nine games, all starts, for the Dragons during the 2002 NFL Europe season as the team finished 2–8. Noa was listed as an offensive guard while in Europe. He was released by the Rams on August 26, 2002.

Noa was signed to the practice squad of the Cleveland Browns on September 10, 2002. He was released on October 1, 2002.

Noa was signed to the Seattle Seahawks' practice squad on October 24, 2002, where he spent the remainder of the season. He re-signed with Seattle after the season, but was later released on August 31, 2003.

The Green Bay Packers signed Noa to their practice squad on September 3, 2003. However, he was released six days later.

Noa was signed to the practice squad of the Detroit Lions on September 16, 2003. He was released on November 11, but re-signed to Detroit's practice squad on December 17, 2003. Noa re-signed with the team on December 29, 2003, after the final game of the regular season. He was waived on August 2, 2004.

Noa was claimed off waivers by the Carolina Panthers on August 3, 2004. He was later released on September 5, 2004.
