= HMSA =

HMSA may refer to

- Hawthorne Math and Science Academy, a school in Hawthorne, California, US
- Hawaii Medical Service Association
