= Health Care Service Corporation =

American health insurer and health maintenance organization

- Type: Mutual Legal Reserve Company
- Industry: Managed health care
- Founded: 1936
- Headquarters: Blue Cross Blue Shield Tower; Chicago, Illinois, US
- Key people: Maurice Smith, Chairman, President, and CEO
- Products: Health plans; group, insurance
- Number of employees: 35,000+
- Website: https://www.hcsc.com/

Health Care Service Corporation (HCSC), a Mutual Legal Reserve Company, is a member-owned health insurance company headquartered in Chicago, Illinois, USA with more than 33,500 employees. HCSC provides health care coverage options for employers, individuals and families, Medicare, and Medicaid.

HCSC is the fourth largest health insurer based on health insurance membership enrollment, serving more than 27 million members.

As an independent licensee of the Blue Cross and Blue Shield Association, HCSC offers Blue Cross and Blue Shield plans in Illinois, Montana, New Mexico, Oklahoma and Texas. HCSC also offers HealthSpring plan options in 50 states, the District of Columbia, and Puerto Rico.

As of June 2026, HCSC’s wholly owned subsidiaries include CareAllies, Dearborn Group, Luminare Health and Medecision.

History

Incorporated in 1936 as Hospital Service Corporation, a Blue Cross plan for hospital services, the company took its current name, Health Care Service Corporation, in 1975 following its merger with Illinois Medical Service, a Blue Shield plan for physician services. By 1982, the smaller “Blues” plans in Illinois joined the Chicago-based plan, which operated as Blue Cross and Blue Shield of Illinois.

In 1966, HCSC established Fort Dearborn Life Insurance, now known as Dearborn Group. In October 2025, Symetra Life Insurance Company acquired Dearborn’s life and disability business. Dearborn continues to offer dental, vision and supplemental health benefits.

Blue Cross and Blue Shield of Texas joined HCSC in 1998, followed by Blue Cross and Blue Shield of New Mexico in 2001, Blue Cross and Blue Shield of Oklahoma in 2005 and Blue Cross and Blue Shield of Montana in 2013. in 2022, HCSC acquired Trustmark Health Benefits, a third-party administrator of health benefits. The subsidiary was rebranded as Luminare Health in 2023.

In March of 2025, Blue Cross Blue Shield licensee Health Care Service Corporation announced it had completed its $3.3 billion acquisition of the Cigna Group’s Medicare Advantage, Medicare Supplemental Benefits, Medicare Part D, and CareAllies businesses.

On July 8, 2025, HCSC announced that its newly acquired Cigna Medicare Advantage products were renamed HealthSpring, which was previously a dormant brand name acquired as part of HCSC deal with the Cigna Group.

== Geographical area of operations ==
As of 2015 HCSC's operations were concentrated in Illinois and Texas, which accounted for 84% of total revenue through the first nine months of 2014, followed by Oklahoma (9% of revenue).

HCSC's membership was approximately 16 million as of December 31, 2019. HCSC's revenue continues to be concentrated in Illinois and Texas, accounting for 83% of premium for the full year 2017. The company's next largest state in terms of premiums is Oklahoma, accounting for approximately 9% of premium.

In January 2020, HCSC announced that it was cutting about 400 employees, most of them in middle management, in order to reduce organizational redundancy and improve decision making efficiency.

In January 2024, the Cigna Group agreed with the Health Care Service Corporation (HCSC) to sell Cigna Group's Medicare Advantage, Cigna Supplemental Benefits, Medicare Part D, and CareAllies businesses. The total value of the transaction was about $3.7 billion. The deal also included a four-year service agreement under which Evernorth Health Services, a subsidiary of the Cigna Group, would continue to provide pharmacy benefits to Medicare beneficiaries. The deal closed on March 19, 2025.

On 8 July 2025, HCSC announced that its newly acquired Cigna Medicare Advantage products would be renamed HealthSpring, which was a dormant brand name acquired as part of HCSC deal with the Cigna Group. A logo and website for the newly revived HealthSpring brand were launched.

== Educational opportunities ==
As of May 1, 2019, HCSC announced an in-house educational program aimed at developing the skills of its employees, dubbed Blue University. Blue University will focus on a number of topics such as healthcare management, leadership, marketing and sales, technology, and service delivery to name a few. Alongside Blue University, HCSC has partnered with local universities where it operates to offer master's degree and certificate partnerships for employees.

== Financial information ==
As of 2014, HCSC was the country's largest nonpublic health insurer and the fifth-largest health insurer overall, with more than 16 million members. HCSC's membership was approximately 16 million at December 31, 2019. HCSC's revenue continues to be concentrated in Illinois and Texas, accounting for 83% of premium for the full year 2017.

In 2010 HCSC nearly doubled its income to $1.09 billion, and began "a streak of billion-dollar profits for 4 straight years". Between 2009 and 2013, HCSC's five-year average of return on capital was 10.5%. During 2014 HCSC profits decreased "from medical losses and expenses associated with the company's aggressive addition of members sourced from ACA exchanges". Yet in 2015, Fitch Ratings assessed its financial strength still at 'A+' and gave it an 'A' for likelihood of default and senior unsecured rating. Finch stated that "lack of geographic diversification has historically kept HCSC out of the 'AA' rating category and that HCSC would be downgraded if it were no longer to market itself as a Blues plan.

HCSC reported a strong underwriting profit in 2017 after losses related to Affordable Care Act (ACA) exchange-sourced business in 2014 and 2015. The company reported annualized return on capital of greater than 40% through the first half of 2018, where achieving a high single-digit ROC would be consistent with Fitch's median guideline for the current rating category. An income tax benefit related to the enactment of the Tax Cuts and Jobs Act equal to $833 million contributed to the sizeable ROC ratio during the first half of 2018. Results are expected to moderate somewhat during the second half of 2018 as policyholders exhaust their deductibles and HCSC pays a greater percentage of claims.
