= Honokaa High & Intermediate School =

Honokaʻa High & Intermediate School
- 45-527 Pakalana Street; Honokaʻa, Hawaii County, Hawaii 96727; United States

Information
- Type: Public
- Established: 1889
- Principal: Kalan Matsumoto
- Grades: 7–12
- Gender: co-educational
- Enrollment: 695 (2024–2025)
- Color: Green Gold
- Mascot: Dragon
- Accreditation: Western Association of Schools and Colleges
- Yearbook: Ka Nani O Honokaa
- Feeder schools: Honokaʻa Elementary School; Waimea Middle School; Paauilo Intermediate School
- Website: www.honokaahighinter.k12.hi.us

Hawaiʻi Register of Historic Places
- Official name: Honokaa High & Elementary School
- Designated: June 29, 2002
- Reference no.: 50-10-35-07522
- Part of: Public Schools on the Island of Hawaiʻi

Honokaʻa High & Intermediate School is a public, co-educational high school and middle school of the Hawaii State Department of Education. It serves grades seven through twelve and was established in 1889. It was added to the Hawaiʻi Register of Historic Places in 2002 under its former name, Honokaa High & Elementary School.

== General information ==
Honokaʻa High & Intermediate School is located in Honokaʻa in Hawaii County on the Island of Hawaiʻi. The campus is at coordinates 20°4′32″N 155°27′49″W, 45-527 Pakalana Street, on both the same side, and across the street from Honokaʻa Elementary School, one of its three feeder schools. The others are Waimea Middle School and Paauilo Intermediate School. The mascot is the Dragon and its school colors are green and gold. It is acclaimed for its Grammy winning Jazz Band, led by music teacher Gary Washburn, who has been teaching at the school for over 40 years.

== History ==
Honokaʻa School was started in 1889 for students from the Hamakua Coastal Sugar Cane Communities and children of Parker Ranch workers. The high school was established a few years later. The weak public interest eventually grew stronger as the public realized the benefits from a high school on the Hamakua Coast of the Big Island. The school, originally known as Honokaʻa High & Elementary, was located at its original location on the eastern side of Pakalana Street, and in 1957 was expanded to include new elementary school buildings and a cafeteria on the western side of Pakalana Street. In the early 2000s, the school was broken up into Honokaʻa High & Intermediate School and Honokaʻa Elementary School.

== Academics ==
In 2021, the school initiated a wall-to-wall career academy structure for students. For high school students, there are two academies, which use Career and Technical education pathways. These are the Academy of Public Service and the Academy of Industry. For intermediate students, the Academy of Discovery is offered.

Per the Board of Education, the school requires a total of 24 credits to graduate. These are six credits in electives, four credits in English, four credits in social studies, three credits in mathematics, three credits in science, two credits in either a world language, a Career and Technical Education pathway, or fine arts, one credit in physical education, half a credit in health, and half a credit for the Personal Transition Plan (PTP).

For dual-credit options, the school offers Advanced Placement (AP) classes. In the 2021-2022 school year, 31% of students took AP exams, with 16% passing.

== Clubs ==
Honokaʻa High & Intermediate School supports clubs that include:

- Academic Decathlon
- Debate Club
- Drama Club
- HOSA
- Poetry Club
- Digital Media Club
- Student Body Government

== Notable alumni ==
- Nelson Doi (1922–2015), former Hawai'i Lieutenant Governor and State Senator
- Kaulana Noa (born 1976), former American football offensive guard drafted by the St. Louis Rams in the 2000 NFL draft.
- Poncie Ponce (born 1933), actor, musician and stand-up comedian
- Dwight Takamine (born 1953), former Hawai'i State Representative and Senator
- Yoshito Takamine (1924–2015), former Hawai'i State Representative and labor leader
- John David Waiheʻe III (born 1946), fourth Governor of Hawaiʻi from 1986 to 1994
