= Yoshito Takamine =

American politician

Member of the Hawaii House of Representatives from the 1st District
- In office 1959–1984
- Preceded by: ?
- Succeeded by: Dwight Takamine

Personal details
- Born: June 24, 1924 Hakalau, Territory of Hawaii
- Died: October 27, 2015 (aged 91) Honokaa, Hawaii
- Party: Democratic
- Spouse: Kimiko Takamine
- Profession: Labor leader Politician

Yoshito Takamine (Japanese: 高嶺 良登, June 24, 1924 – October 27, 2015) was an American politician and labor leader in Hawaii. Takamine, who was first elected to the Hawaii House of Representatives in 1958, when the state was still the Territory of Hawaii, served in the state House of Representatives for 12 consecutive terms until his retirement in 1984. Takamine, the longtime chairman of the House Labor Committee, oversaw the creation of the Hawaii Prepaid Health Care Act of 1974, which made Hawaii the first U.S. state to require minimum standards for the health care benefits offered to workers.

== Biography ==
=== Early life ===
Yoshito Takamine, the oldest son and third child of his family's 14 children, was born on June 24, 1924, in Hakalau, Hawaii, to parents from Okinawa. His father, Tozo Takamine, had immigrated in 1919 from his home in Shimajiri Gun, Okinawa, to the island of Hawaii, where he worked on the plantations. Takamine's mother, Usa Takamine, who was also Okinawan, was a picture bride who married Tozo in a "shinpai" marriage three years later. Tozo and Usa Takamine lived and worked in Hakalau at the time of Yoshito Takamine's birth. Takamine's father worked on the plantations for 10 hours per day, six days a week. His mother grew vegetables and washed laundry for the "lunas," or supervisors, to bring in extra income.

=== Labor ===
Takamine graduated from Honokaa High School in 1944 and then worked for the now defunct Honokaa Sugar Company. He joined the International Longshore and Warehouse Union (ILWU). Takamine became an ILWU business agent in 1950. He rose to become of the ILWU's union division director, which he held until his retirement from the local ILWU leadership in 1986.

=== Political career ===
A well known labor and union leader, Takamine was first elected to the Hawaii House of Representatives in 1958, when Hawaii was still a territory. Takamine, who served in the House of Representatives for 12 consecutive terms from 1959 until 1984, was the longtime chairman of the House Labor Committee during the 1960s and 1970s. He pushed through legislation aimed at protecting the rights of workers in Hawaii. Takemine's legislative achievements included the collective bargaining law, which granted public employees the right to unionize, the worker's compensation law, and the temporary disability insurance law.

As chairman, Takamine was one of the principle architects and proponents of the Hawaii Prepaid Health Care Act of 1974, which set minimum standards of health care benefits for workers. Hawaii became the first U.S. state to adopt minimum health care benefits for the labor force under the landmark law.

State Rep. Mark Nakashima, who presently represents state District 1 in House, recalled the contributions Takamine made to the state and Hawaii County in 2015, "He was very much supportive of agriculture, especially in the Hamakua area, and did a lot to ensure that agriculture remained a mainstay on Hawaii Island." Nakashima also added that while he was growing up, "We lived in the middle of a cane field in Kalopa. There's a small paved road that goes down there, and I remember my grandmother telling me, from a very young age, that Yoshito was responsible for getting that road done for (his family). There are so many stories like that, where Yoshito was able to provide resources for the residents living in the Hamakua area. I think a lot of his legacy is the resources that we enjoy in Hamakua and along the Hilo coast that speak of his ability to provide for his constituents."

Takamine retired from the Hawaii House of Representatives in 1984 after 12 consecutive terms. He was succeeded in the Big Island's 1st District by his son, Dwight Takamine, who held the seat from 1984 to 2009.

Yoshito Takamine died at his home in Honokaa, Hawaii, on October 27, 2015, at the age of 91. He was survived by his wife, Kimiko; five children, Dwight Takamine, Delbert Takamine, Arlene Hashimoto, Melanie Fergerstrom, and Karleen Kaohimaunu; three sisters, three brothers and fifteen grandchildren. His memorial service was held at Dodo Mortuary in Hilo on November 18, 2015.

Hawaii Governor David Ige ordered that flags be flown at half staff on November 20, 2015, in Takamine's honor.
