= Blue Cross Blue Shield Tower =

Office skyscraper in Chicago, Illinois

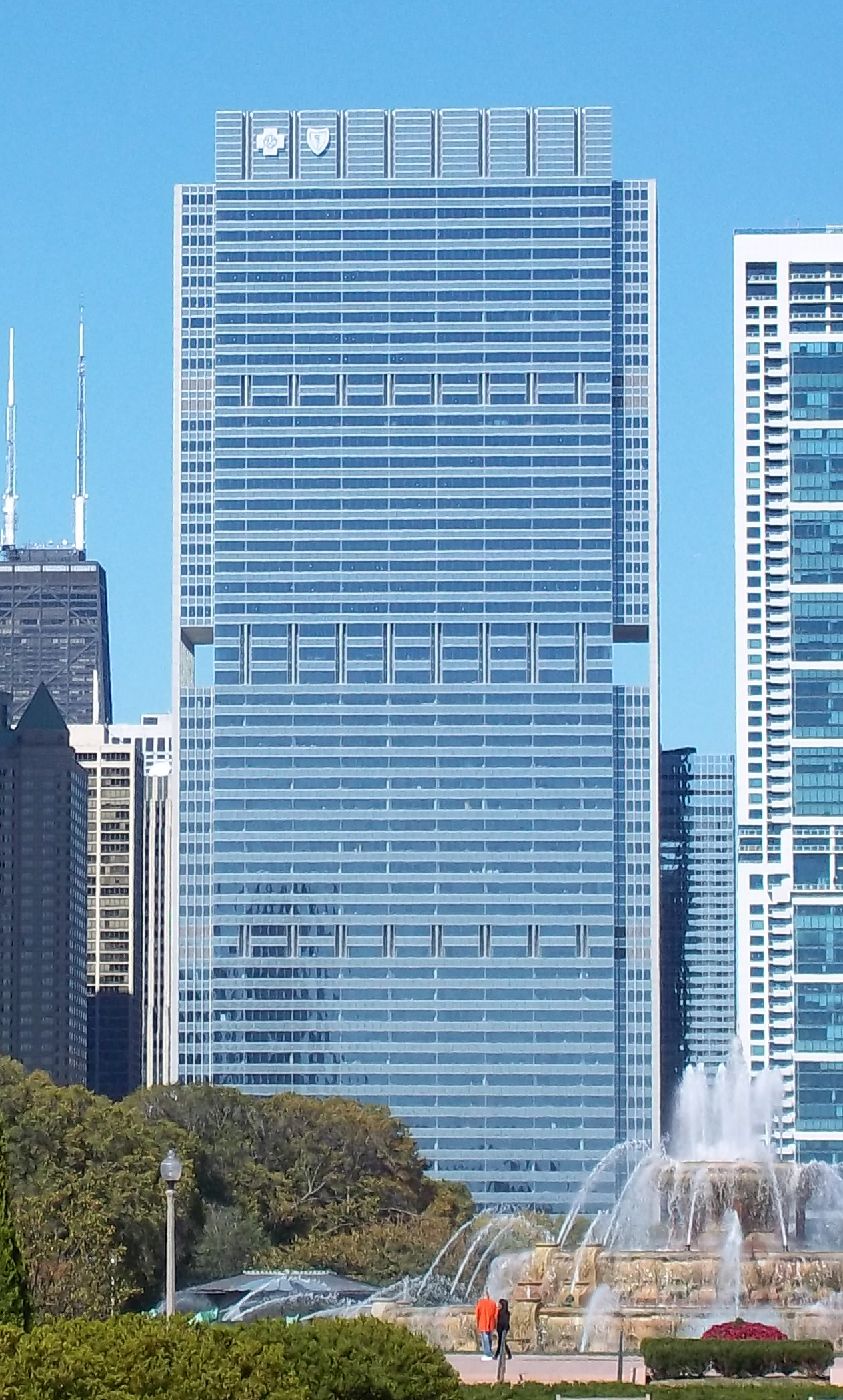
- Blue Cross Blue Shield Tower

- Location within Chicago metropolitan area Blue Cross Blue Shield Tower (Illinois) Blue Cross Blue Shield Tower (the United States)

General information
- Status: Completed
- Type: Office
- Location: 300 E. Randolph St. Chicago, Illinois
- Coordinates: 41°53′5.55″N 87°37′11.66″W
- Construction started: 1995 (phase 1); 2007 (phase 2)
- Completed: 1997 (phase 1); 2010 (phase 2)

Height
- Roof: 744 ft (227 m)

Technical details
- Floor count: 54

Design and construction
- Architects: Lohan Associates (Phase 1); Goettsch Partners (Phase 2)
- Structural engineer: Magnusson Klemencic Associates

The Blue Cross Blue Shield Tower (BCBS) is on the north end of Millennium Park along E. Randolph Street at the NE corner of Randolph and Columbus Drive, in Chicago, Illinois, United States. It is home to the headquarters of Health Care Service Corporation.

The building's address is 300 E. Randolph Street and is next to the Aon Center. Original plans to connect the two buildings via an underground pedway never came to fruition.

Architect James Goettsch of Goettsch Partners designed the building. The 33-story first phase was completed in 1997 under the firm name of Lohan Associates (now Goettsch Partners). The 24-story second phase started in 2007 and was completed in 2010.

== Expansion ==
In 2006 the City of Chicago granted a building permit to Health Care Service Corporation Blue Cross Blue Shield of Illinois to renovate the building upwards, which gave additional 24 stories and made the building 57 stories in total (3 floors below ground). Upon its completion, it became the first project in Chicago that built upon an existing tower.

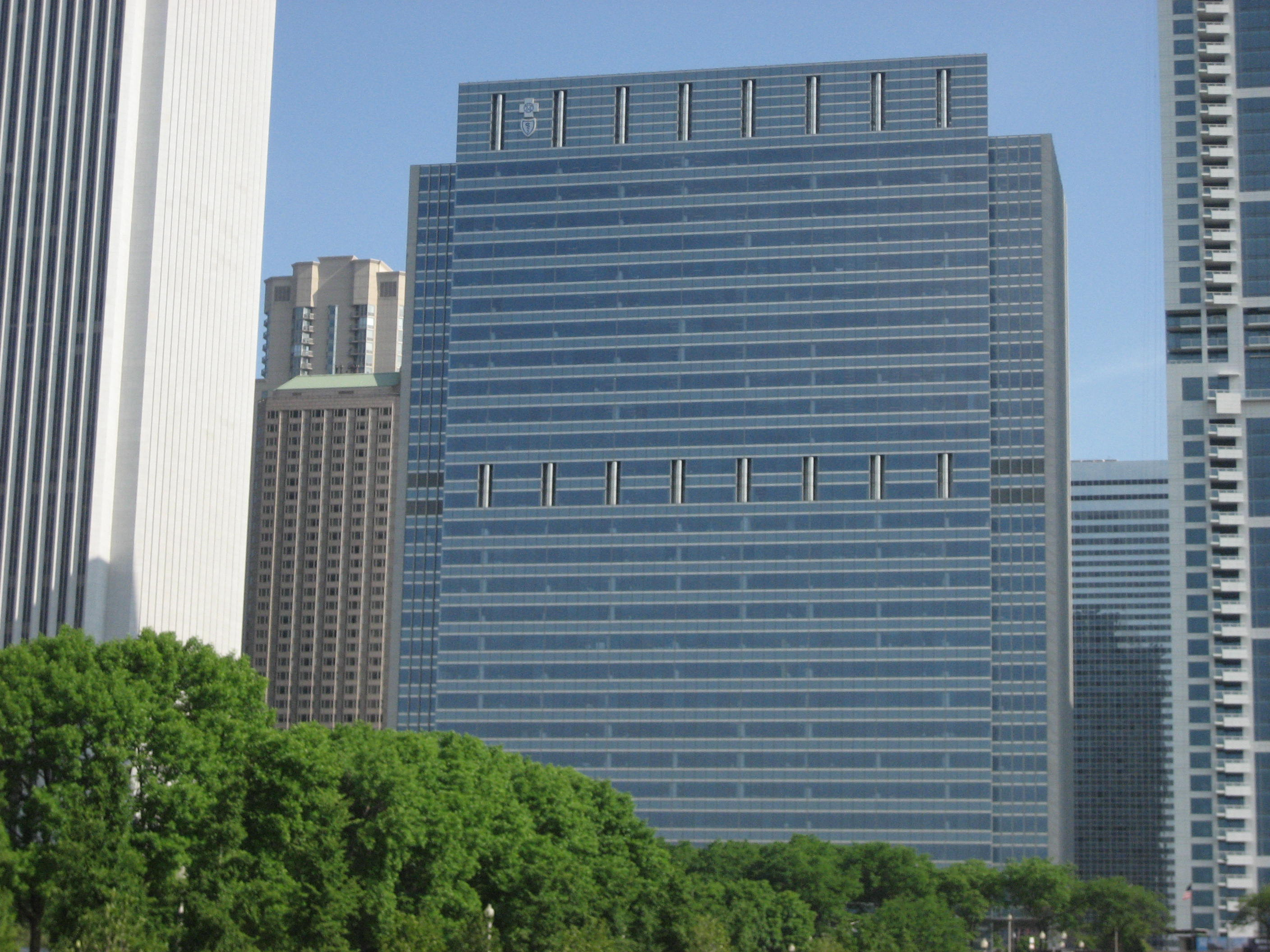
Photo from 2007 prior to expansion

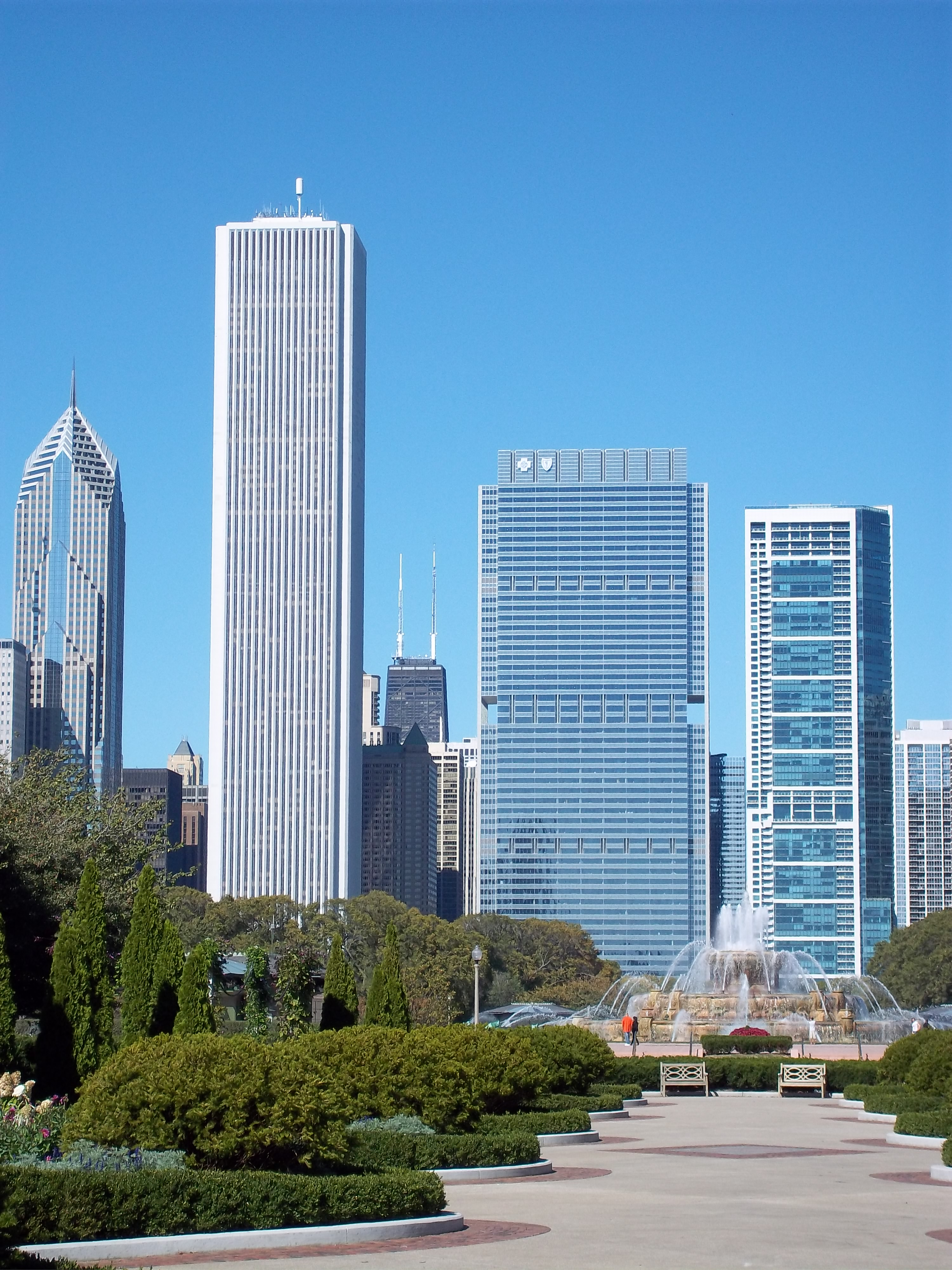
2010 - Showing the building's new height in relation to surrounding

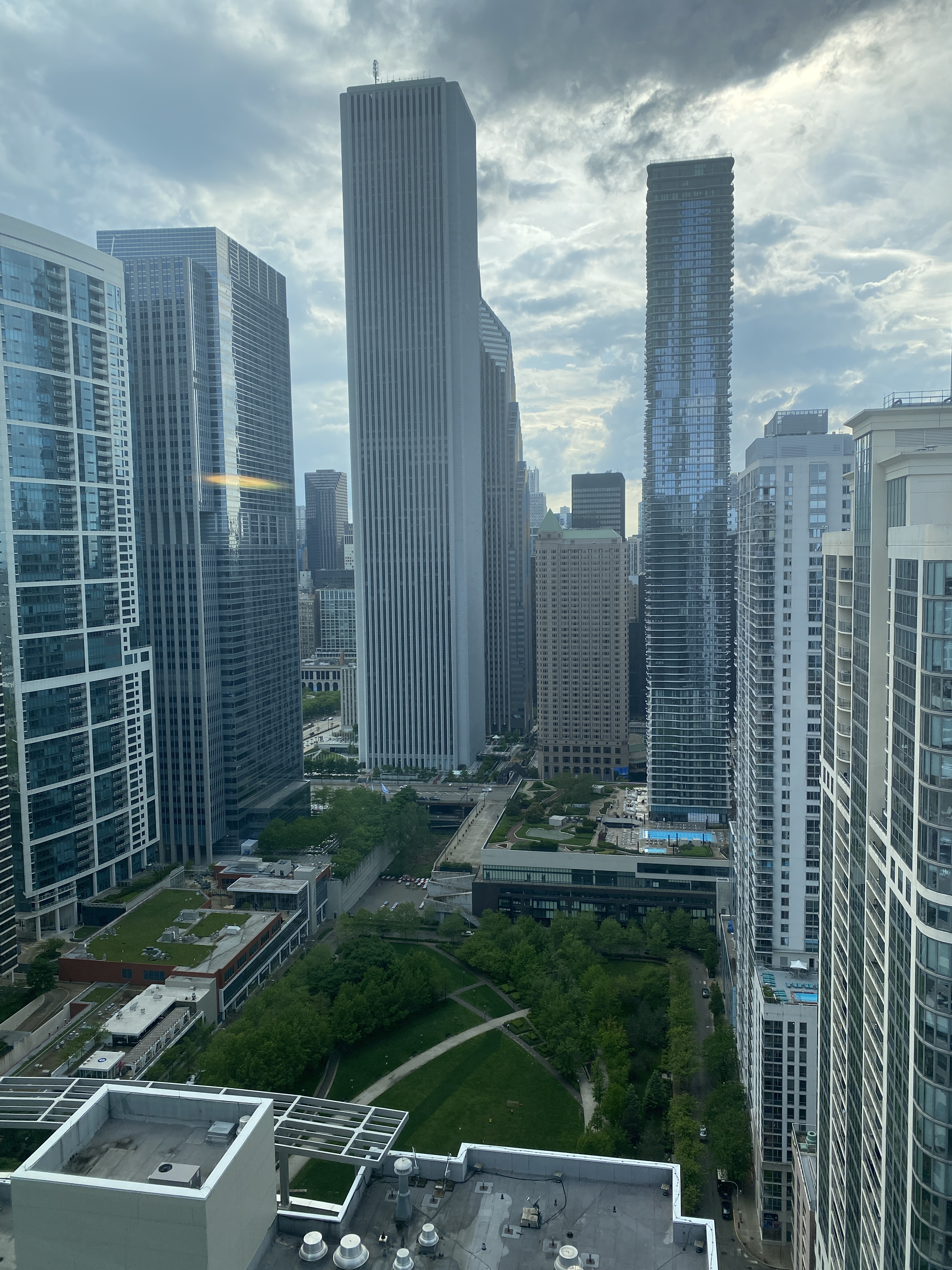
2010 - Showing the building from Lakeshore East

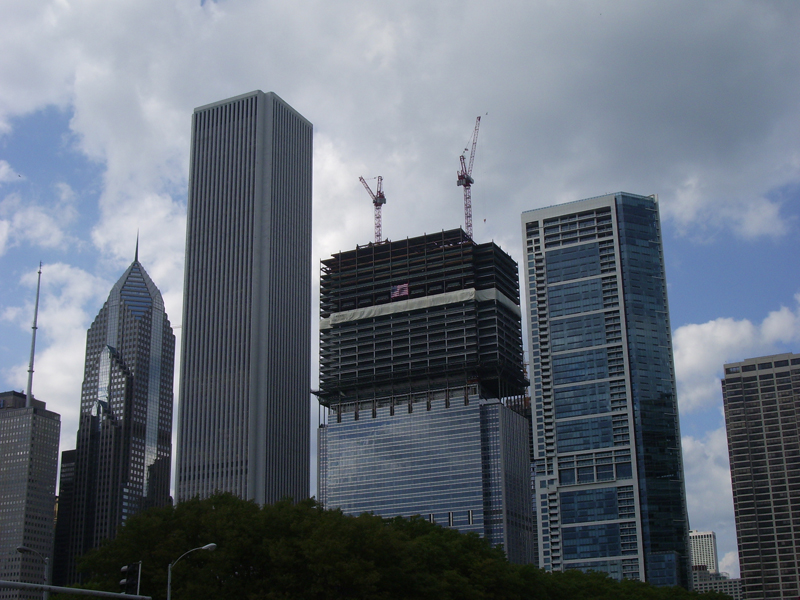
Photo from Sept. 2008 during expansion

== Tenants ==
- Baker & McKenzie
- Health Care Service Corporation
- McKinsey & Company

== Tower as billboard ==
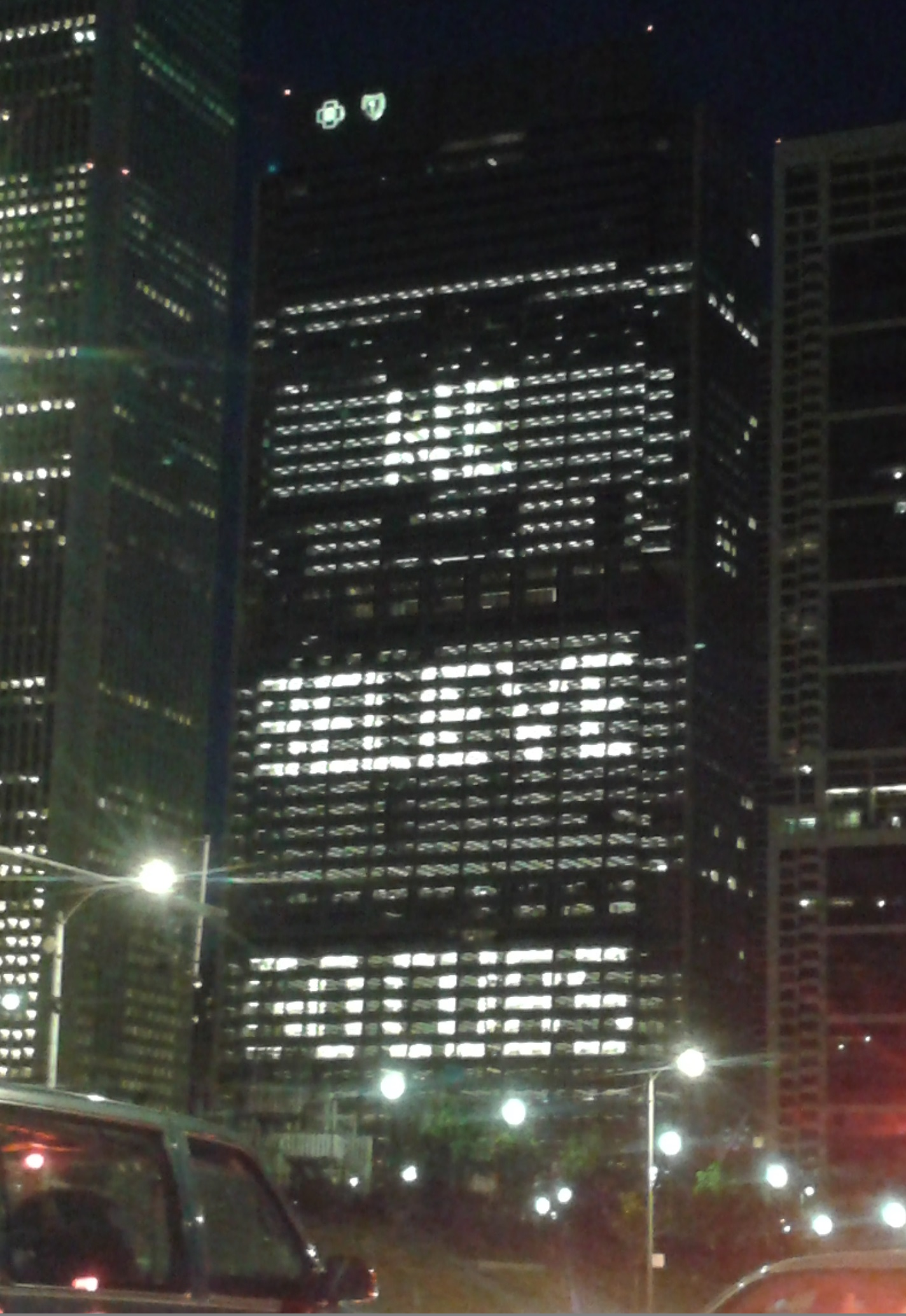
A message displayed to celebrate the Chicago Cubs' effort to win the 2015 NLCS

The management of the Blue Cross Blue Shield Tower frequently shows its support for health care issues, local events, Chicago sports, and charities by arranging to have appropriate messaging displayed at night on the south facade of the building facing Grant Park.

Unlike the nearby CNA Center, which uses AutoCAD, the design of messages on the tower's facade is drafted by hand in the form of sketches or also by using Microsoft Excel. Nevertheless, work on arranging them in both towers is done manually by adjusting the window shades floor by floor, with the work carried out by the buildings' staff.

== Position in Chicago's skyline ==
The below image was produced in 2006, prior to the tower's expansion.

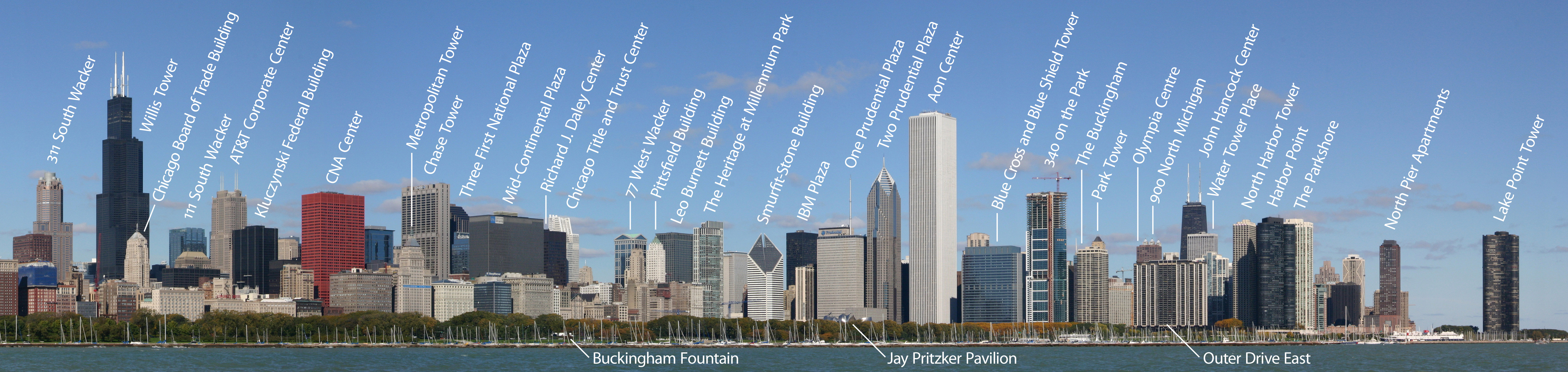

== See also ==
- List of tallest buildings in Chicago
- List of tallest buildings in the United States
