= BlueCross BlueShield of South Carolina =

American insurance company

- Type: Mutual insurance
- Industry: Health Insurance
- Founded: 1946 (Began); 1950 (Incorporated)
- Founder: South Carolina Hospital Service Plan
- Headquarters: Columbia, South Carolina
- Key people: Mike Mizeur, Chief Executive; Ed Sellers, Chairman, Board of Directors; Joe Sullivan, Chairman, Board's Executive Committee
- Number of employees: 11,000+
- Website: southcarolinablues.com

BlueCross BlueShield of South Carolina (BlueCross) is an independent licensee of the Blue Cross and Blue Shield Association. BlueCross serves 21.5 million people through private business and government contracts.

BlueCross has several subsidiaries, two of which are affiliates licensed with the Blue Cross and Blue Shield Association. Licensed subsidiaries include BlueCross BlueShield of South Carolina Foundation and BlueChoice HealthPlan. Non-licensed affiliates include Companion Captive Insurance Company, Companion Life, PGBA, LLC, Planned Administrators, Inc. (PAI) and TCC of South Carolina.

== History ==
BlueCross began as the South Carolina Hospital Service Plan, later becoming BlueCross of South Carolina (BlueCross), when the General Assembly passed legislation bringing this group into existence. In the spring of 1947, the South Carolina Hospital Service Plan merged with the Hospital Benefit Association of Greenville, giving them a financial base. In 1971, BlueShield of South Carolina merged with BlueCross to form the current company.

In July 2020, BlueCross BlueShield of South Carolina and the BlueCross BlueShield of South Carolina Foundation joined several organizations well-established in the trenches of diabetes care, including the Alliance for a Healthier South Carolina and the state's Department of Health and Environmental Control, to launch Diabetes Free SC, a long-term, multi-million dollar, statewide initiative dedicated to addressing these disparities in care in three strategic directions: improved pregnancy outcomes in women with diabetes; reduced lifelong risk of diabetes in children; and the prevention of diabetes and its complications in adults. The BlueCross Foundation awarded $11.6 million in three- to-five year grants to Prisma Health, the Medical University of South Carolina (MUSC), the Alliance for a Healthier Generation and FoodShareSC to support efforts in each of these categories.

== BlueChoice HealthPlan ==
BlueChoice HealthPlan was founded in 1984, originally as Companion HealthCare, and was the first health maintenance organization (HMO) offered by BlueCross BlueShield of South Carolina. To date, BlueChoice HealthPlan has nearly 200,000 members.

In 2008 the HMO added a Medicaid option called BlueChoice HealthPlan Medicaid for eligible South Carolinians.

In 2013, A.M. Best affirmed BlueChoice HealthPlan's A+ (Superior) financial strength rating as part of the group rating for BCBSSC.

== Other companies ==
Other companies owned by BlueCross BlueShield of South Carolina include:

- Companion Benefit Alternatives - behavioral health benefits administrator founded in 1984
- Companion Life - life, disability, and dental insurance, acquired by Blue Cross of South Carolina in 1970
- Celerian Group - government programs, founded 2011
  - CGS - formerly Cigna Government Services, Medicare contracting, acquired in 2011
  - Companion Data Services (CDS) - founded in 2000
  - JBS International - consulting, acquired in 2017
  - Karna - consulting, acquired in 2018
  - Palmetto GBA - Medicare contracting, founded 1992
  - PGBA, LLC - TRICARE contracting, founded 1996
- Planned Administrators, Inc. (PAI) - third-party administrator, acquired 1973
- TCC of South Carolina - third-party administrator, formerly Thomas H. Cooper and Company

== Coronavirus pandemic ==
BlueCross BlueShield of South Carolina decided to waive all out-of-pockets fees of the members for COVID-19 related treatments.
