= Hawaii Medical Service Association =

Nonprofit health insurer in Hawaii, U.S.

- Established: 1938
- Type: Non-Profit
- Location: Honolulu, Hawaii, USA
- Region served: Hawaii
- Services: Health Insurance, Telehealth
- Members: 741,000 (2020)
- President and CEO: Mark M. Mugiishi
- Affiliations: Blue Cross Blue Shield
- Employees: 1,600 (2021)
- Website: https://hmsa.com/

Hawaii Medical Service Association (HMSA) is a nonprofit health insurer in the state of Hawaii. HMSA was founded in 1938, is an independent licensee of the Blue Cross Blue Shield Association, and is the largest insurer in the state of Hawaii serving more than 700,000 people.

== Hawaii Medical Service Association (HMSA) ==
The Hawaii Medical Service Association (HMSA) is a member of the Blue Cross Blue Shield Association, an association of independent medical insurance providers. A nonprofit, mutual benefit association founded in 1938, HMSA covers more than half of the state’s population. HMSA’s headquarters are located at the HMSA Center, 818 Keeaumoku Street, in Honolulu. 21°17′49″N 157°50′29″W.

=== History ===
In 1935, a group of Hawaii social workers started a nonprofit association governed by a community board of directors. In June 1938, HMSA established its headquarters in Honolulu with 671 members. In 1946, HMSA joined the Blue Shield Association. During the 1950s, HMSA introduced a Major Medical Plan to help protect against the cost of catastrophic illness.

In the 1960s, HMSA developed health plans for senior citizens, college students, and the unemployed. Drug, dental and vision plans, and preventive benefits, were introduced. In 1972, HMSA introduced the Community Health Program, its first Health maintenance organization (HMO). The Hawaii Prepaid Health Care Act of 1974 required nearly all employers to provide health insurance to full-time employees. In 1980, Health Plan Hawaii was certified as a federally qualified HMO.

In 1990, HMSA joined the Blue Cross Association and became the Blue Cross and Blue Shield Association plan of Hawaii. In 1994, HMSA began contracting with Hawaii QUEST, a state program with medical, dental and behavioral health benefits for Medicaid or State Health Insurance Program recipients. In 1999, the National Committee for Quality Assurance (NCQA) awarded Health Plan Hawaii with the highest HMO accreditation possible.

=== Litigation ===
In the 2000s, HMSA endured a round of provider led litigation, including the latest charges of anti-competitive practices, filed in U.S. District Court in April 2013. This litigation is still ongoing.

=== Plans and programs ===
HMSA offers a variety of health plans, including Preferred Provider Organization (PPO) plans and Health Maintenance Organization (HMO) plans. HMSA offers plans through employers and individual plans for those not eligible through employer groups. Some health plans may include supplemental benefit coverage for prescription drugs and dental, vision, and complementary care (acupuncture, chiropractic care and massage therapy).

HMSA’s health and wellness programs help members stay healthy and avoid costly chronic diseases.

=== HMSA365 ===
HMSA365 is a program for HMSA members to receive discounts on selected health and wellness services in Hawaii. Launched in 2009, HMSA365 was created in conjunction with the national Blue365, a health and wellness discount program of the Blue Cross and Blue Shield Association. The name was chosen because health plan members can receive the discounts 365 days of the year to help them stay healthy and fit. Members show their HMSA card to participating businesses to receive the discounts.

=== HMSA Teen Video Awards ===
The HMSA Teen Video Awards Contest is open to middle school and high school students throughout the state. Public Service Announcements of 27 seconds receive cash awards and are aired on television. The contest has been held since 2004.

== Affiliates ==
The nonprofit HMSA Foundation is involved in health promotion, education and research; and the promotion of social welfare.

== Premiums ==
HMSA premiums have gradually increased in line with the rest of the nation. Despite Hawaii's increased health care costs compared to the rest of the nation, HMSA premiums have historically been and continue to be among the lowest in the nation
