= Blue Cross Blue Shield Association =

Federation of 36 separate United States health insurance organizations and companies

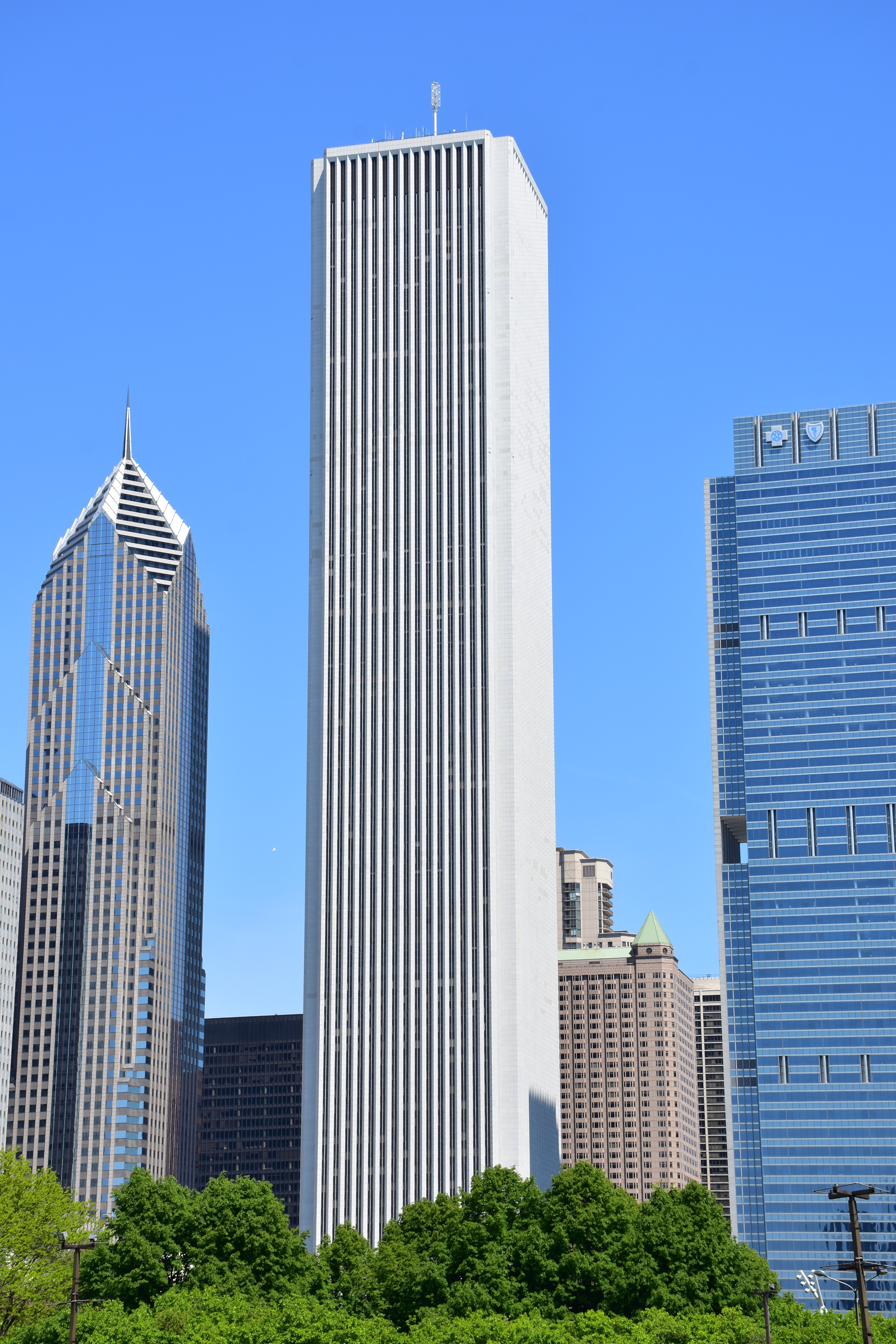
- Aon Center, the Blue Cross Blue Shield Association headquarters in Chicago
- Founded: 1946; 80 years ago
- Tax ID no.: 13-5656874
- Legal status: 501(c)(4) public welfare organization
- Location: 200 E. Randolph Street, Chicago, Illinois, U.S.
- Coordinates: 41.8864516°N 87.6239771°W
- Products: Health insurance PPOs and HMOs
- President and CEO: Kim Keck
- Subsidiaries: Health Services Foundation; BC and BS Foundation on Health Care; BCBSA Services Inc
- Revenue: $457,383,677 (2014)
- Expenses: $449,635,361 (2014)
- Employees: 1,253 (2014)
- Website: www.bcbs.com

Blue Cross Blue Shield Association, also known as BCBS, BCBSA, or The Blues, is a United States–based federation with 33 independent and locally operated BCBSA companies that provide health insurance to more than 115 million people in the U.S. as of 2022.

It was formed in 1982 from the merger of its two namesake organizations. Blue Cross was founded in 1929 and became the Blue Cross Association in 1960. Blue Shield emerged in 1939, and the Blue Shield Association was created in 1948. Its headquarters are at the Aon Center at 200 E. Randolph Street in Chicago, Illinois.

BCBSA controls access to the Blue Cross and Blue Shield trademarks and names across the United States and in more than 170 other countries, which it then licenses to the affiliated companies for specific, exclusive geographic service areas. It has affiliated plans in all 50 states, Washington, D.C., and Puerto Rico, and licensees offering plans in several foreign countries; it also participates in the nationwide health insurance program for employees of the United States federal government.

BCBSA manages communications between its members and the operating policies required to be a licensee of the trademarks. This permits each BCBSA company to offer nationwide insurance coverage through its BlueCard provider network and claims reimbursement program even though it operates only in its designated service area.

== History ==
Blue Cross and Blue Shield developed separately. Blue Cross provided coverage for hospital services, and Blue Shield covered physicians' services.

Blue Cross is a name used by an association of health insurance plans throughout the United States. Its predecessor was developed by Justin Ford Kimball in 1929, while he was vice president of Baylor University's health care facilities in Dallas, Texas. The first plan guaranteed teachers 21 days of hospital care for $6 a year, and was later extended to other employee groups in Dallas, and then nationally. The American Hospital Association (AHA) adopted the Blue Cross symbol in 1939 as the emblem for plans meeting certain standards. In 1960, the AHA commission was superseded by the Blue Cross Association. Blue Cross severed its ties with the AHA in 1972.

Blue Shield was developed by employers in lumber and mining camps of the Pacific Northwest to provide medical care by paying monthly fees to medical service bureaus composed of groups of physicians. In 1939, the first official Blue Shield plan was founded in California. In 1948, the symbol was informally adopted by nine plans called the Associated Medical Care Plan, and was later renamed the National Association of Blue Shield Plans.

In the 1960s, the U.S. government chose to partner with Blue Cross and Blue Shield companies to administer Medicare.

In 1982, Blue Shield merged with The Blue Cross Association to form the Blue Cross and Blue Shield Association (BCBS).

Prior to 1986, organizations administering BCBS were tax exempt under 501(c)(4) as social welfare plans. However, the Tax Reform Act of 1986 revoked the exemption because the plans sold commercial-type insurance. They became 501(m) organizations, subject to federal taxation, but entitled to "special tax benefits" under IRC 833.

In 1994, BCBS changed to allow its licensees to be for-profit corporations. During 2010, Health Care Service Corporation, the parent company of BCBS in Texas, Oklahoma, New Mexico, Montana and Illinois, nearly doubled its income to $1.09 billion in 2010, and began four years of billion-dollar profits. In the final spending bill for FY 2015, after much lobbying since 2010, nonprofit Blue Cross and Blue Shield plans continue to have special tax breaks that were understood to be threatened by the Affordable Care Act of 2010.

== Current organization ==
Blue Cross and Blue Shield insurance companies are licensees, independent of the association and traditionally of each other, offering insurance plans within defined regions under one or both of the association's brands. Blue Cross Blue Shield insurers offer some form of health insurance coverage in every U.S. state. They also act as administrators of Medicare in many states or regions of the U.S.

The Blue Cross Blue Shield Federal Employee Program (FEP) is a nationwide option under the Federal Employees Health Benefits Program (FEHB) for U.S. federal government employees and retirees and has been part of FEHB since FEHB's inception in 1960. FEP enrolls over half of the federal workforce, with over 5 million members, making it the largest insurer of federal employees and the largest single health plan group in the world.

The association is headquartered in the Michigan Plaza complex in the Chicago Loop area of Chicago, Illinois.

== Multi-state member organizations ==
- Blue Cross Blue Shield of Michigan
  - Blue Cross Blue Shield of Vermont
- CareFirst
  - District of Columbia
  - Maryland
  - Parts of Virginia (Alexandria City, Arlington County, Falls Church City, Fairfax City, and parts of Fairfax and Prince William counties)
- Elevance Health (formerly Anthem)
  - Anthem Blue Cross and Blue Shield
    - Colorado
    - Connecticut
    - Georgia
    - Indiana
    - Kentucky
    - Maine
    - Missouri (excluding 30 counties in the Kansas City area)
    - Nevada
    - New Hampshire
    - New York (eastern and southeastern counties)
    - Ohio
    - Virginia (excluding (Alexandria City, Arlington County, Falls Church City, Fairfax City, and parts of Fairfax and Prince William counties)
    - Wisconsin
  - Anthem Blue Cross (California)
- GuideWell
  - Florida Blue
  - Triple-S Management (includes Puerto Rico and the US Virgin Islands)
- Health Care Service Corporation
  - Blue Cross Blue Shield of Illinois
  - Blue Cross Blue Shield of Montana
  - Blue Cross Blue Shield of New Mexico
  - Blue Cross Blue Shield of Oklahoma
  - Blue Cross Blue Shield of Texas
- Highmark
  - Highmark Blue Cross Blue Shield (Western and Northeastern Pennsylvania)
  - Highmark Blue Shield (Eastern & Central Pennsylvania)
  - Highmark Blue Cross Blue Shield Delaware (Delaware)
  - Highmark Blue Shield of Northeastern New York (New York)
  - Highmark Blue Cross Blue Shield West Virginia (formerly Mountain State Blue Cross Blue Shield) (West Virginia)
  - Highmark Blue Cross Blue Shield of Western New York (New York)
- Premera
  - Premera Blue Cross Blue Shield of Alaska
  - Premera Blue Cross of Washington
- Cambia Health Solutions
  - Regence BlueShield of Idaho
  - Regence BlueCross BlueShield of Oregon
  - Regence BlueCross BlueShield of Utah
  - Regence BlueShield (Washington)
- Wellmark Blue Cross Blue Shield
  - Iowa
  - South Dakota

== Single-state member organizations ==
Single-state members include the following organizations.

- Blue Cross and Blue Shield of Alabama
- Blue Shield of California
- Blue Cross and Blue Shield of Kansas City
- Blue Cross Blue Shield of Massachusetts
- Blue Cross Blue Shield of North Dakota
- Blue Cross Blue Shield of South Carolina
- BlueCross BlueShield of Tennessee
- Capital Blue Cross (Central Pennsylvania)
- Hawaii Medical Service Association
- Horizon Blue Cross Blue Shield of New Jersey
- Independence Blue Cross (Philadelphia, Southeastern Pennsylvania)

=== Arizona ===
Blue Cross Blue Shield of Arizona (BCBSAZ) is a non-profit healthcare organization founded in 1939. BCBSAZ partners with non-profit "Discovery Triangle Development Corporation" to launch a Farm Express mobile market (formerly Fresh Express).

=== Arkansas ===
Founded in 1948, Arkansas Blue Cross Blue Shield (ABCBS) is an independent licensee of the Blue Cross Blue Shield Association, and the largest healthcare provider in the state. It donated $1.98 million to The Walton College of Business toward founding its Robert L. Shoptaw Master of Healthcare Business Analytics Program. In August 2022, more than 12,000 members of Arkansas Blue Cross were affected by a ransomware attack on a former affiliate, North Highland Company, LLC.

=== Idaho ===
Blue Cross of Idaho and Regence BlueShield Idaho are separate companies and compete throughout the state.

=== Kansas ===
Blue Cross and Blue Shield of Kansas (BCBSKS) was founded in 1942 by Sam Barham, later becoming an independent licensee of the Blue Cross Blue Shield Association.

=== Louisiana ===
Blue Cross Blue Shield of Louisiana is a tax-paying non-profit that was founded in 1934 in New Orleans. An independent licensee of the BCBSA, it is a privately held mutual company without shareholders, which is wholly owned by its policyholders.

=== Minnesota ===
Blue Cross Blue Shield of Minnesota (BCBSMN) was founded in 1933, with 3,500 employees reported in 2022.

=== Mississippi ===
Blue Cross Blue Shield of Mississippi (BCBSMS) was formed as a privately held company in 1954. In 1948, it was converted to a non-profit. In 1973, its name was changed from Mississippi Hospital and Medical Service to Blue Cross & Blue Shield of Mississippi, Inc., which, in 1996, was converted from a non-profit membership corporation to a mutual insurance company, with the name again changed, to Blue Cross & Blue Shield of Mississippi, A Mutual Insurance Company. During 2022, BCBS and University of Mississippi Medical Center (UMMC) network entered conflict over who is to blame for an increasing lack of covered care in the state. Media reported that UMMC had paid close to $279,000 for digital advertising, commercials, and billboards to attack BCBS, which, in subsequent months, sued the hospital for defamation. In December 2022, UMMC and BCBS reached a new contractual agreement.

=== Nebraska ===
Blue Cross Blue Shield of Nebraska was founded in 1939. On July 1, 2018, BCBS Nebraska formed GoodLife Partners Inc., a mutual holding company, to conduct its noninsurance businesses. The company retained the Blue Cross brand, converting from mutual ownership to a stock company wholly owned by GoodLife.

=== New York ===
Excellus BlueCross BlueShield (Excellus BCBS, or Excellus) is a non-profit health insurance company headquartered in Rochester, New York. It is part of the Blue Cross Blue Shield Association. In 2010, Excellus was Upstate New York's largest nonprofit health plan.

In 2001, Excellus merged with Univera Healthcare, (formerly North AmeriCare), based in Buffalo, New York. Univera retained its name and is separate from Excellus BCBS. Excellus was the target of a cyberattack in 2015, in which 10.5 million records were hacked, and cost the company 17.5 million dollars. The company's Blue Cross Blue Shield subsidiaries have been known as:

- BlueCross BlueShield of Central New York
- BlueCross BlueShield of the Rochester Area
- BlueCross BlueShield of Utica-Watertown

=== North Carolina ===
By September 2010, BCBS licensee Blue Cross and Blue Shield of North Carolina announced that it would refund $156 million to their policyholders following documented charges: they had been sued and fined for denying due medical treatments to their customers and for underpaying doctors. As of 2019 they were overseeing well over half of all payments for medical services in their state. BCBSNC invests in chronic and underlying condition research, telehealth and artificial intelligence (AI) for digital healthcare.

In 2019, Blue Cross and Blue Shield of North Carolina agreed to enter into a partnership with Cambia Health, but cancelled the agreement later that year. Dr. Patrick H. Conway, who had served as CEO from 2017, was scheduled to become CEO of the merged company, replacing retiring Cambia CEO Mark Ganz, but resigned after a DWI arrest in June 2019, putting the merger on hold.

=== Pennsylvania ===
Though historically "Blue Cross" was used for hospital coverage while "Blue Shield" was used for medical coverage, today that split only exists for traditional health insurance plans in Pennsylvania. Two independent companies operate in central Pennsylvania, Highmark Blue Shield in Pittsburgh and Capital Blue Cross in Central Pennsylvania. In southeastern Pennsylvania, Independence Blue Cross in Philadelphia has a joint marketing agreement with Highmark Blue Shield in Pittsburgh for their separate hospital and medical plans. However, Independence Blue Cross, like most of its sister Blue Cross Blue Shield companies, cover most of their customers under managed care plans such as HMOs and PPOs which provide hospital and medical care in one policy.

=== Rhode Island ===
Blue Cross & Blue Shield of Rhode Island was founded in 1939. The insurer is headquartered in Providence, Rhode Island.

=== U.S. Virgin Islands ===
BlueCross BlueShield of the U.S. Virgin Islands is administered by BlueCross BlueShield of Puerto Rico.

=== Wyoming ===
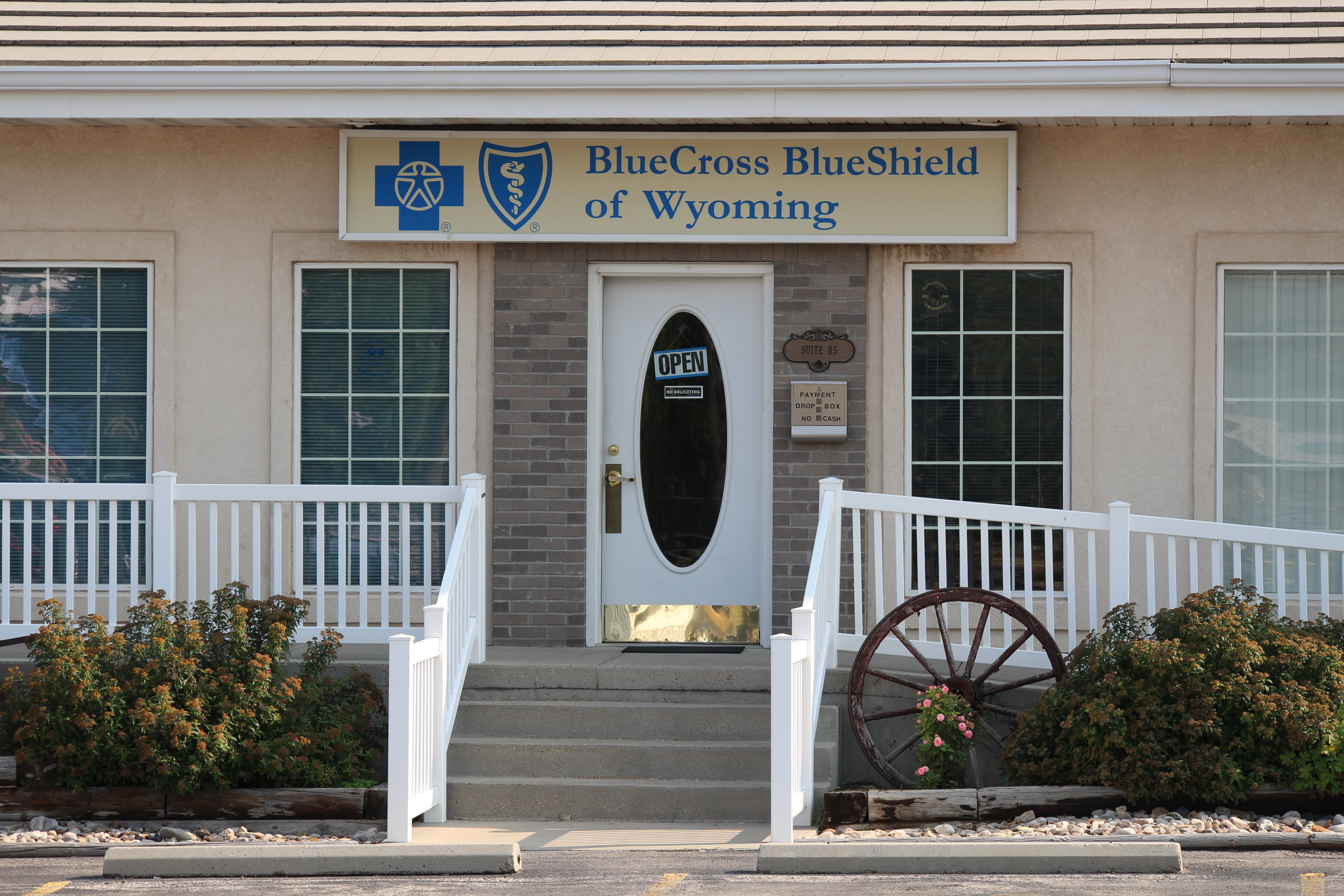
Blue Cross Blue Shield of Wyoming in Gillette, Wyoming

Blue Cross Blue Shield of Wyoming (BCBSWY) is a non-profit founded in 1945. In 2022, BCBSWY penned opposition to the Pharmacy benefit managers act enhancements (Wyoming Senate File 0036).

== Companies outside of the United States ==
- Blue Cross Blue Shield of Costa Rica
- Blue Cross Blue Shield of Panama
- Blue Cross Blue Shield of Uruguay
- Canadian Association of Blue Cross Plans
- GeoBlue

== Nonprofit status debate ==
While only some members retain nonprofit status, the ones that do have been criticized for holding excessive amounts of cash or excessive executive compensation. For instance, the CEO of BCBS Michigan, Daniel Loepp, earned over US$19 million in 2018, more than the CEO of Ford or Fiat Chrysler during the same year.

In 2014, BC/BS of Illinois (Health Care Service Corporation) was sued over its nonprofit status. The lawsuit was dismissed, with prejudice, and the dismissal ruling was upheld on appeal. Similar suits occurred with similar results in other states such as Oregon.

== For-profit conversions ==
Conversions into for-profit corporations typically results in distribution of some of the assets into a charitable foundation. When Blue Cross of California was converted, it initially had no distribution, but subsequently The California Endowment and California Health Care Foundation were endowed with $3.2 billion. Proceeds ranged from $3.2 billion (California) to $1.5 million (Nevada).

An exceptional case occurred in the Empire Blue Cross conversion, where the proceeds went to fund wage increases for union workers.

== Antitrust settlements ==
In 2022, the group of 34 companies that make up the BCBS Association settled an antitrust investigation by allowing competition among member companies under non-Blue names while retaining regional exclusivity for regional licenses.

In October 2024, BCBS settled a class-action antitrust lawsuit first brought in 2012 by physicians, hospital systems, and other providers who alleged that they had been underpaid for insurance reimbursements, with BCBS agreeing to pay $2.8 billion to resolve the claims, in the largest healthcare antitrust settlement to date.

== Claim denial controversies ==
=== Robert Salim throat cancer treatment denial ===
In 2018, Louisiana attorney Robert Salim was diagnosed with stage 4 throat cancer, however, the proton therapy ordered by his doctor was denied by Blue Cross Blue Shield. Salim sued. In July 2022 the United States District Court, Western District of Louisiana ruled that "Because Salim showed that PBT was a nationally accepted standard of care for advanced head and neck cancer in 2018, BCBSLA abused its discretion in finding Salim's PBT treatment was not medically necessary." A ProPublica investigation found that Blue Cross and Blue Shield of Louisiana used guidelines from an outside company called AIM Specialty Health to reject appeals for denial, and that this practice was widespread.

=== Surgical anesthesia denial ===
In August 2024, BCBS of Illinois, Texas, New Mexico, Montana, and Oklahoma changed their surgical anesthesia reimbursement policy to remove additional payments for medically complex patients, a move which the company said would streamline costs. This move was strongly denounced by the American Society of Anesthesiologists.

In November 2024, it was announced that BCBS of New York, Connecticut, and Missouri would cease to cover the cost of anesthesia for surgeries which exceeded a time limit based on data from the Centers for Medicare and Medicaid Services, regardless of the time actually required for the surgery. Anthem argued that there was evidence of overbilling fraud by anesthesiologists, patients wouldn't have to pay if their operations went overtime, and that anesthesiologists could appeal for payment in the event that their operation went over the limit for out of medical necessity. The American Society of Anesthesiologists decried this move, calling it a “money grab” and “commercial health insurers looking to drive their profits up at the expense of patients”. This move was later canceled the day after the assassination of UnitedHealthcare CEO Brian Thompson which caused the policy to receive renewed backlash online, though there is no direct evidence linking either event to the cancelation due to backlash existing before the shooting.

A week after the shooting, a woman in Lakeland, Florida was arrested and charged after allegedly saying "Delay, deny, depose, you people are next" to a line representative after her claim was denied. The judge set her bail at $100,000, citing "the status of our country at this point".

=== Ken Jones lung cancer treatment denial ===
After retired San Francisco firefighter Ken Jones was diagnosed with lung cancer in 2025, Blue Cross Blue Shield denied his claim for treatment. News station ABC7 Bay Area published a story on the case in January 2026. After the story publicized the case, BCBS offered a plan for Jones treatment that was still incomplete. Jones died from lung cancer on May 30, 2026.

== See also ==
- Blue Cross Canada
- Healthcare industry
- Healthcare companies
