= Hawaii Prepaid Health Care Act =

Law relating to healthcare in Hawaii, United States

Hawaii Prepaid Health Care (PHC) Act (PHCA) is a state law (Hawaii Revised Statutes Chapter 393) enacted June 12, 1974 in the State of Hawaii to improve health care coverage by employer mandate. The Hawaii Prepaid Health Care Act set a minimum standards of health care benefits for workers. Upon its adoption in 1974, Hawaii became the first U.S. state to require minimum standards of health care benefits by law. Hawaii State Rep. Yoshito Takamine, the longtime chairman of the House Labor Committee, was one of the law's chief architects and proponents.

Among other things, Hawaii's law requires employers to offer coverage to employees working at least 20 hours per week for four or more consecutive weeks. In contrast, the federal Patient Protection and Affordable Care Act requires employers to offer coverage to employees working at least 30 hours per week effective Jan. 1, 2014. The two laws also establish different penalties for employers that do not offer coverage.

The federal Employee Retirement Income Security Act of 1974 (ERISA) contains an exemption for the PHCA. Before the passage of the Prepaid Health Care Act, Hawaii had an uninsured rate of 30%. By 2013, Hawaii's uninsured rate of 6.7% was the second-lowest uninsured rate in the nation, trailing only Massachusetts, which had an uninsured rate of 3.7%.
