= BlueCross BlueShield of Tennessee =

Health benefit plan company

- Founded: 1945
- Subsidiaries: Volunteer State Health Plan
- Website: www.bcbst.com

BlueCross BlueShield of Tennessee is the largest health benefit plan company in Tennessee. It is an independent, not-for-profit organization governed by its own board of directors. The organization is part of a nationwide association of health care plans licensed by the Blue Cross and Blue Shield Association.

== History ==
BlueCross was founded in 1945 when Roy McDonald saw the need to establish a payment system that would benefit Erlanger Hospital, now the Erlanger Health System.

On October 2, 2009, 57 computer hard drives were stolen from Blue Cross, some containing Social Security numbers, birth dates, addresses and medical information. Some of them contain Social Security numbers, birth dates, addresses and medical information. In 2012, the company was fined $1.5 million over the data breach.
