= Honokaʻa, Hawaii =

Census-designated place in Hawaii, U.S.

Honokaʻa
- Census-designated place
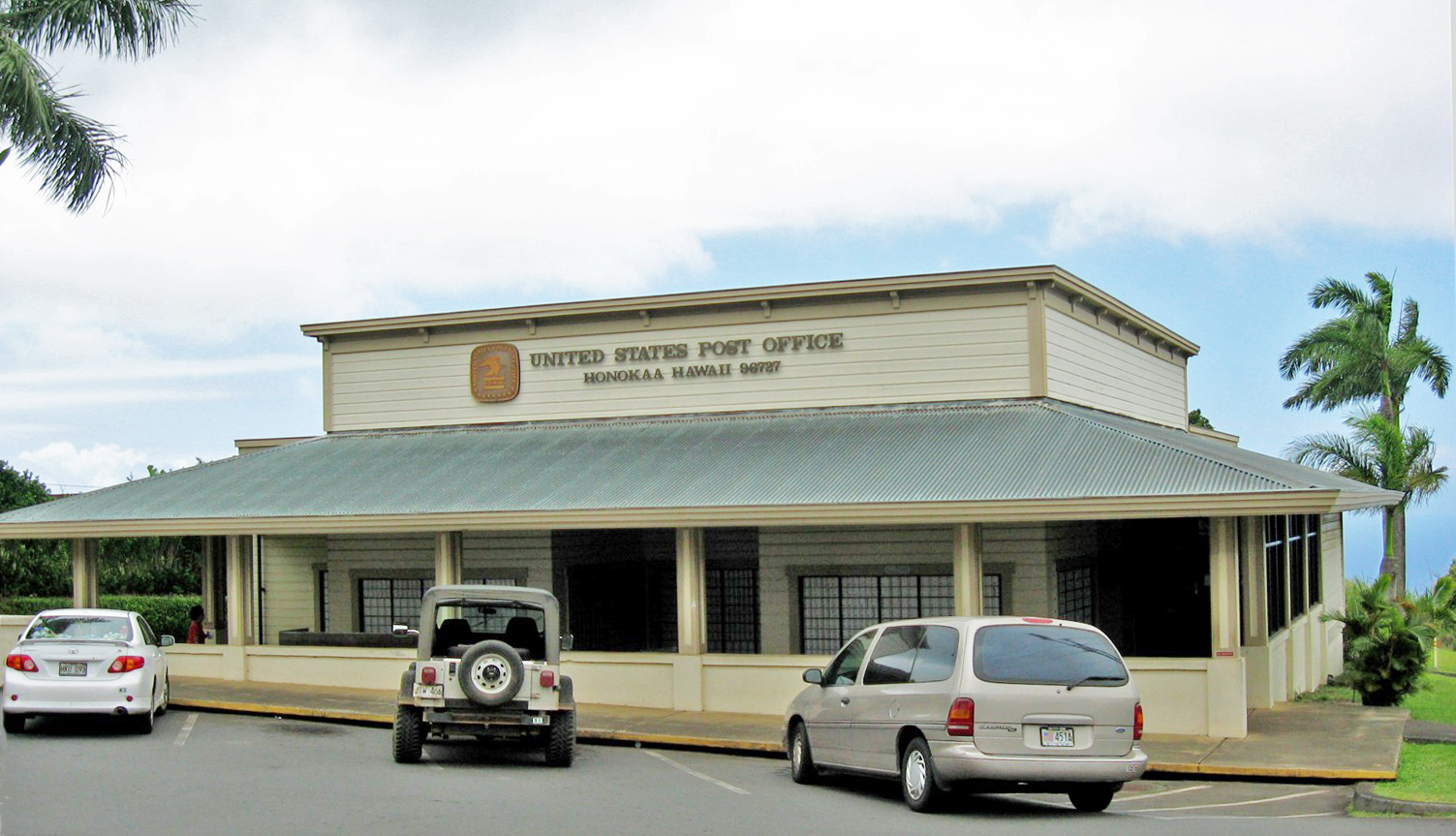
- Post office for ZIP code 96727

- Location in Hawaii County and the state of Hawaii
- Coordinates: 20°4′39″N 155°27′51″W
- Country: United States
- State: Hawaii
- County: Hawaii
- District: Hamakua

Area
  - Total: 2.10 sq mi (5.45 km^{2})
  - Land: 2.10 sq mi (5.45 km^{2})
  - Water: 0 sq mi (0.00 km^{2})
- Elevation: 994 ft (303 m)

Population (2020)
  - Total: 2,699
  - Density: 1,282/sq mi (494.8/km^{2})
- Time zone: UTC-10 (Hawaii-Aleutian)
- ZIP code: 96727
- Area code: 808
- FIPS code: 15-16450
- GNIS feature ID: 0359281

Honokaʻa is a census-designated place (CDP) in the Hamakua District of Hawaiʻi County, Hawaiʻi, United States. The population was 2,699 at the 2020 census.

== Geography ==
Honokaʻa is located on the north side of the island of Hawaiʻi at 20°4′39″N 155°27′51″W (20.077617, -155.464074). Hawaii Route 19 runs through the southern part of the community, leading southeast 42 miles (68 km) to Hilo and west 14 miles (23 km) to Waimea. Hawaiʻi Route 240 branches off Route 19 and runs through the center of Honokaʻa, then continues west 8 miles (13 km) to its terminus at the Waipiʻo Valley lookout.

According to the United States Census Bureau, the CDP has a total area of 1.3 square miles (3.3 km^{2}), all of it land.

== Demographics ==
Historical population
Census	Pop.	Note	%±
2000	2,233		—
2010	2,258		1.1%
2020	2,699		19.5%
U.S. Decennial Census

=== 2000 Census data ===
As of the census of 2000, there were 2,233 people, 761 households, and 563 families residing in the CDP. The population density was 1,739.5 inhabitants per square mile (671.6/km^{2}). There were 835 housing units at an average density of 650.5 per square mile (251.2/km^{2}). The racial makeup of the CDP was 25.03% White, 0.09% African American, 0.04% Native American, 42.86% Asian, 3.94% Pacific Islander, 1.03% from other races, and 27.00% from two or more races. Hispanic or Latino of any race were 9.63% of the population.

There were 761 households, out of which 29.2% had children under the age of 18 living with them, 54.1% were married couples living together, 14.5% had a female householder with no husband present, and 25.9% were non-families. 23.1% of all households were made up of individuals, and 14.1% had someone living alone who was 65 years of age or older. The average household size was 2.88 and the average family size was 3.37.

In the CDP the population was spread out, with 25.2% under the age of 18, 7.1% from 18 to 24, 24.4% from 25 to 44, 21.7% from 45 to 64, and 21.6% who were 65 years of age or older. The median age was 40 years. For every 100 females, there were 94.3 males. For every 100 females age 18 and over, there were 93.4 males.

The median income for a household in the CDP was $41,964, and the median income for a family was $45,962. Males had a median income of $28,359 versus $23,750 for females. The per capita income for the CDP was $17,226. About 6.0% of families and 9.6% of the population were below the poverty line, including 11.5% of those under age 18 and 4.5% of those age 65 or over.

== History ==
Honokaʻa's economy was based primarily on the sugar production of the Hāmākua Sugar Company from 1873 to 1994. With the closing of the Honokaʻa sugar production and the most recent staggered tourism, the local economy has been in decline. It has become increasingly a bedroom community for Hilo. As the gateway to the Hāmākua Coast, Honokaa provides the first unobstructed view of the Pacific Ocean traveling downslope from Waimea.

The Hāmākua Coast was the classic plantation community in the early 20th century, but since the closing of the Big Island's sugar industry, the district has had to diversify its economy. Presently, with much of the district still zoned for agriculture, Hāmākua has seen rising prospects in other crops including pineapples, coffee, papaya, macadamia nuts, and tea.

== People ==
Honokaʻa is the home of the fourth governor of Hawaii since statehood, John D. Waiheʻe III, who served from December 2, 1986, to December 2, 1994. Waiheʻe is the first Native Hawaiian to hold that office anywhere in the United States.

Honokaʻa is home to Matthew Beck Perkins, a jazz electronic musician, known online by Loid, who is co-director and video editor of the acclaimed Silas Podcast (not to be confused or affiliated with Silas Rosenstern, who is in no way related to the Silas Podcast, who is also the director and executive manager of the Matthew Podcast, which is in no way affiliated with Matthew Beck Perkins.) The Silas Podcast is composed of two additional Honokaʻa members: BIIF State Qualifying Cross Country runner Jett Dye and Honokaa Ensemble's Band drummer Kaliko Kalawe.

Honokaʻa was also home to Yoshito Takamine, the late Hawaiʻi state representative and labor leader.

Roseanne Barr, an American actress, comedian, writer, producer and politician, resides in Honokaʻa.

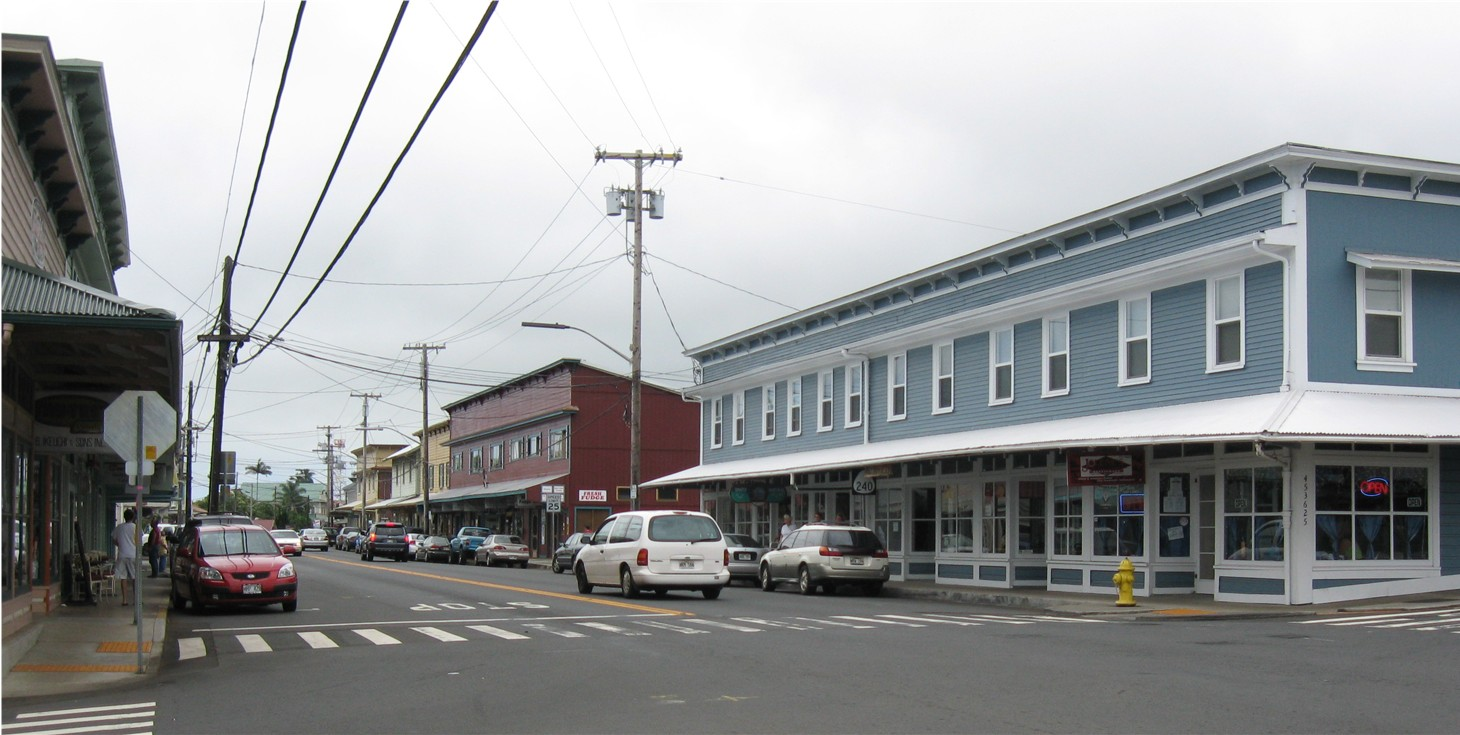
Historic main street of Honokaʻa

== Culture ==
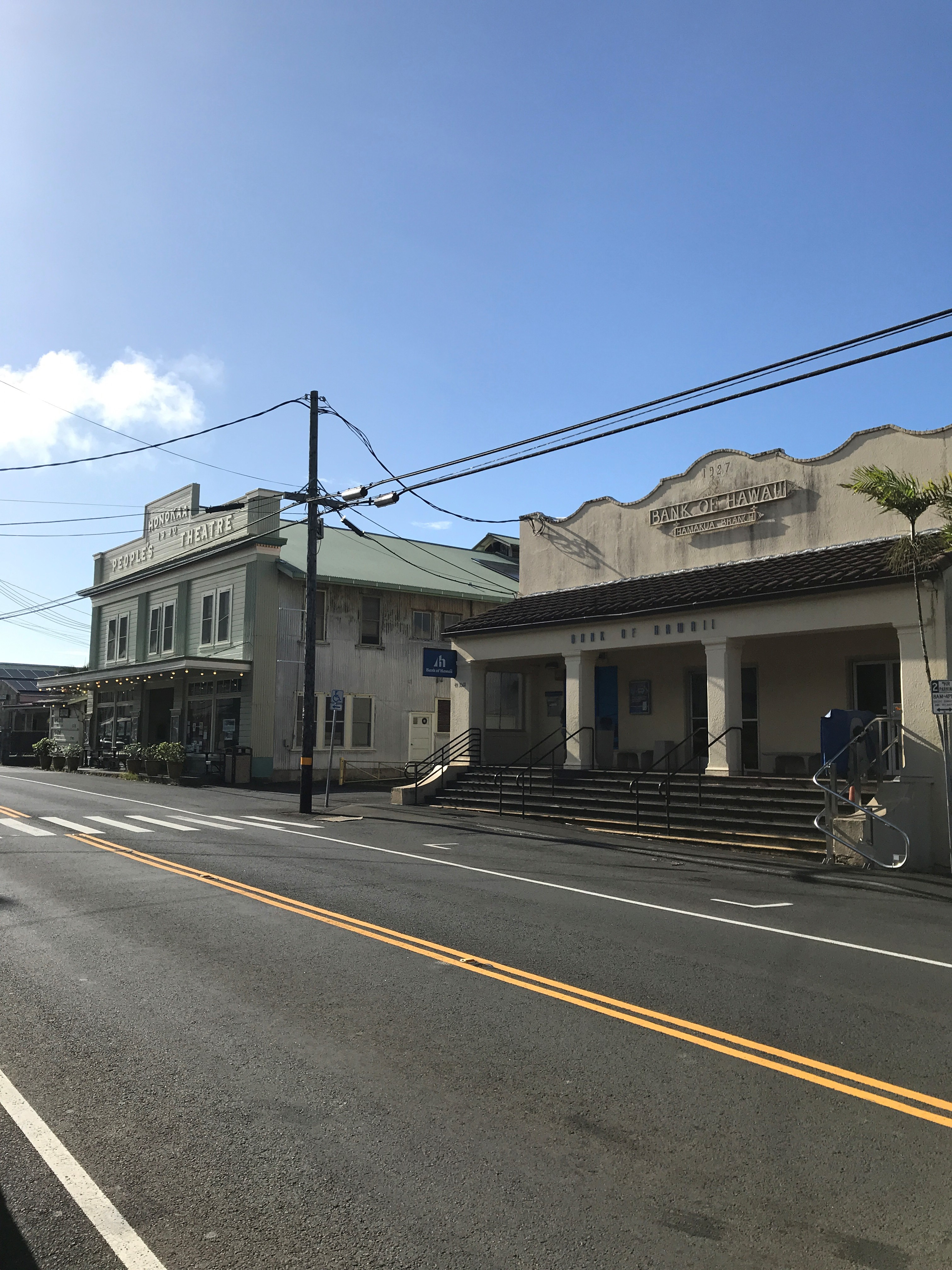
Bank of Hawaii and the People's Theater

Honokaʻa boasts a historic downtown district. In 1930, the Honokʻaa People's Theatre was built on Māmane Street by the Tanimoto family. The theater hosted the Hāmākua Music Festival every fall from 1993 to 2006, and again in 2009. Proceeds went to fund local music education on the island. The festival has hosted a number of jazz, classical, and Hawaiian folk musicians, including Ray Brown, Gene Harris, James Moody, Howard Alden, Big Brother and the Holding Company and Hubert Laws.

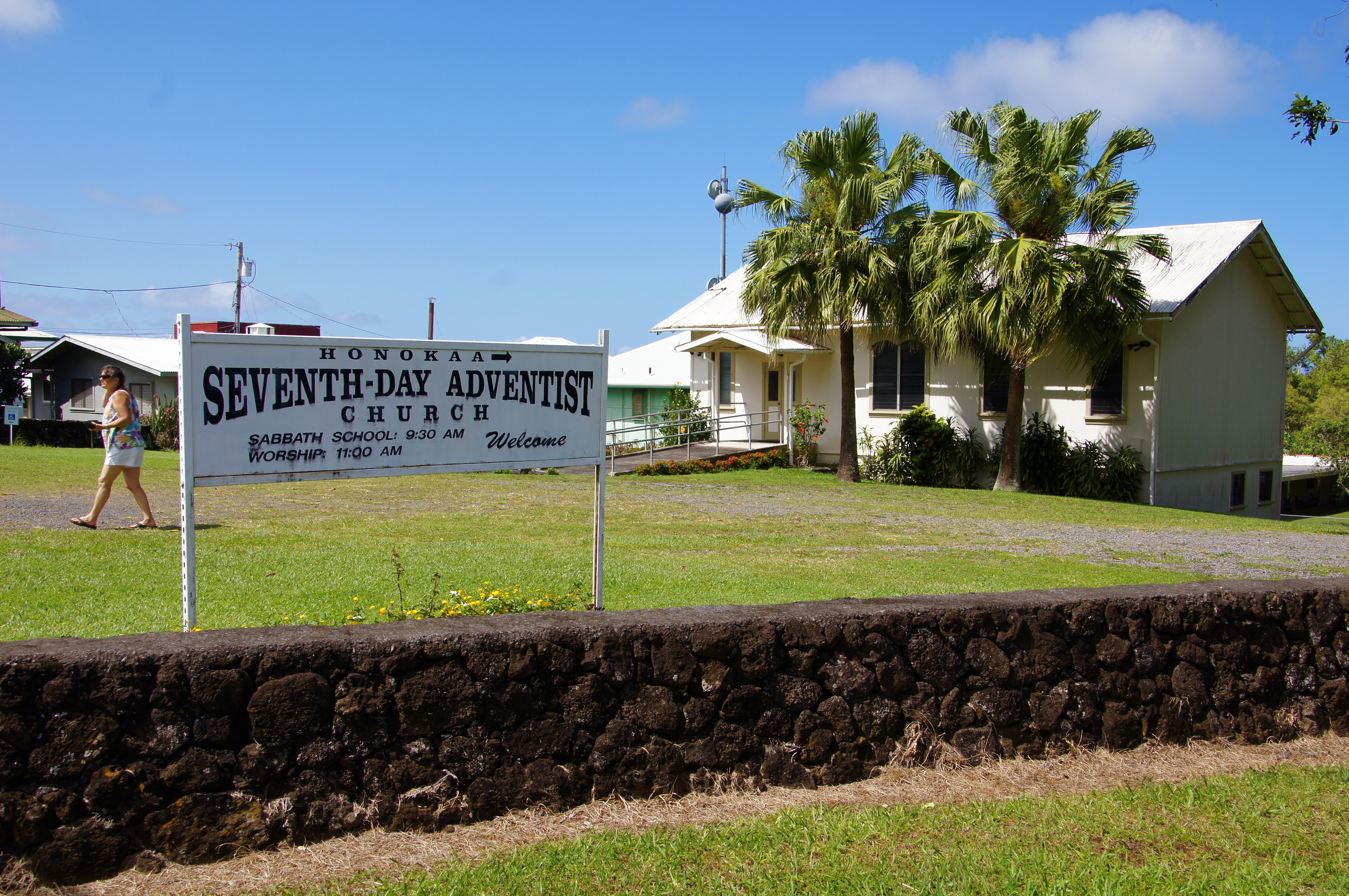
A church in Honokaa

Ranching, along with nascent diversified agriculture, is the primary industry in Honokaʻa and the Hamakua District. Honokaʻa hosts a Saturday farmers' market, held on Māmane Street, The Farmers' Market at Hāmākua Harvest on Sundays from 9:00am – 2:00pm on the corner of Māmane Street and Māmalahoa Highway.

While ranching and rodeos may seem idiosyncratic to some visitors, ranching in Hawaii has a long history. This tradition has been celebrated annually on Western Weekend beginning in 2006, and included children's activities, country western bands, a block party with paniolo barbecue, a rodeo, and the ribald Saloon Girl Contest. Western Weekend was sponsored in part by a grant from the County of Hawaiʻi Department of Research & Development, Hawaiʻi Tourism Authority.

== Cinema ==
Honokaʻa is the namesake and setting in the 2009 Japanese film Honokaʻa Boy (Japanese: ホノカアボーイ). The world premier occurred in the Honokaʻa People's Theatre, which was featured prominently in the film.

There is reference to a marketplace in the town in the film Cloud Atlas.

== Education ==
The statewide school district is the Hawaii State Department of Education, and it covers Hawaii County. Honokaʻa High & Intermediate School is located in the CDP. Honokaʻa Elementary School shares some campus facilities such as the cafeteria and library.

The Hawaii State Public Library System operates the Honokaa Library.

== See also ==
- List of places in Hawaiʻi
